= Christianity Today =

Evangelical Christian magazine

- Cover of the April 2010 issue
- President & CEO: Nicole Massie Martin
- Editor-in-Chief: Marvin Olasky
- Former editors: Carl F. H. Henry, Harold Lindsell, Kenneth S. Kantzer, V. Gilbert Beers, David Neff, Terry C. Muck, George K. Brushaber, Mark Galli, Daniel M. Harrell, Russell D. Moore
- Frequency: Monthly
- Circulation: 130,000
- Founder: Billy Graham
- First issue: October 1956
- Company: Christianity Today International
- Country: United States
- Based in: Carol Stream, Illinois
- Language: English
- Website: christianitytoday.com
- ISSN: 0009-5753
- OCLC: 1554505

Christianity Today is an evangelical Christian media magazine founded in 1956 by Billy Graham. It is published by Christianity Today International based in Carol Stream, Illinois. The Washington Post calls Christianity Today "evangelicalism's flagship magazine". The New York Times describes it as a "mainstream evangelical magazine". Christianity Today has a print circulation of approximately 110,000 and an online readership of 2.2 million at ChristianityToday.com.

The founder, Billy Graham, stated that he wanted to "plant the evangelical flag in the middle of the road, taking the conservative theological position but a definite liberal approach to social problems". Other publications active within Christianity Today include: Building Church Leaders which has vocational education materials for evangelists and clergy. Church Law & Tax which discusses tax compliance. ChristianBibleStudies helps with Bible studies. ChurchSalary helps churches with information on proper remuneration. Ekstasis Magazine about Christian arts and media, specifically to encourage creativity within Christian culture to enable better storytelling, worldbuilding, and cultural representation. PreachingToday is a publication specifically for those delivering sermons. SmallGroups is a leadership magazine for smaller church planting groups such as missional living, cafe churches, pub churches, or house churches. On September 24, 2025, Marvin Olasky, the former editor-in-chief of World magazine, was named Editor-in-Chief, replacing former editor Russell D. Moore.

Graham began the magazine as counterpoint to The Christian Century, the predominant independent periodical of mainline Protestants, and as a way to bring the evangelical Christian community together.

== History ==
=== Founding and early history ===
The second issue of Christianity Today was created in the date of October 15, 1956, and the opening editorial, Why 'Christianity Today'?, stated "Christianity Today has its origin in a deep-felt desire to express historical Christianity to the present generation. Neglected, slighted, misrepresented—evangelical Christianity needs a clear voice, to speak with conviction and love, and to state its true position and its relevance to the world crisis. A generation has grown up unaware of the basic truths of the Christian faith taught in the Scriptures and expressed in the creeds of the historic evangelical churches."

Its first editor was Carl F. H. Henry. Notable contributors in its first two decades included F. F. Bruce, Edward John Carnell, Frank Gaebelein, Walter Martin, John Warwick Montgomery, and Harold Lindsell. Lindsell succeeded Henry as editor and during his editorial administration much attention centered on debates about biblical inerrancy. Later editorial leadership came from Kenneth Kantzer, Terry Muck, and David Neff. V. Gilbert Beers was hired as the fourth editor in 1982, reportedly to increase the magazine's lay readership. From 2015 until January 3, 2020, Mark Galli was the editor in chief. Following Galli's retirement Daniel M. Harrell served as editor in chief for a year. Russell Moore took the position in August 2022. In September 2025, Moore transitioned to the role of Editor-at-Large and Columnist and was replaced as Editor-in-Chief by Marvin Olasky, the former Editor-in-Chief of World magazine.

In Billy Graham's 1997 autobiography, Just As I Am, he writes of his vision, idea, and history with Christianity Today, and his early meeting with oil company executive, John Howard Pew, to establish the publication. Most critics label Christianity Today as a mainstream, intellectual, centrist evangelical publication.

=== Editorials on impeachments of U.S. presidents ===
On June 7, 1974, in an editorial entitled "Should Nixon Resign?", published during the impeachment hearings of President Richard Nixon, Christianity Today wrote "that the constitutional process should be followed, and followed with dispatch." The magazine did not call for his resignation, but instead stated that "If he is acquitted, the nation will have to wait out the term of a President whose ability to function has been seriously eroded." On October 5, 1998, regarding the imminent impeachment of President Bill Clinton, Christianity Today stated in an editorial that "Unsavory dealings and immoral acts by the president and those close to him" have compromised his administration's moral leadership, criticizing his televised August 17 confession as a "nonapology".

In an editorial published on December 19, 2019, a day after the U.S. House of Representatives impeached President Donald Trump for abuse of power and obstruction of Congress, editor in chief Mark Galli asserted among other criticisms that he sought to leverage his political power "to coerce a foreign leader to harass and discredit" presidential candidate Joe Biden. He argued: "That is not only a violation of the Constitution; more importantly, it is profoundly immoral." The editorial received extensive media coverage and caught the attention of Trump and his allies, who in response sought to discredit the publication, with the former describing it as "far-left", and almost 200 evangelical leaders rebuking it for the editorial.

=== Sexual harassment accusation ===
In 2022, the magazine published two articles announcing that a number of women reported demeaning, inappropriate, and offensive behavior by former editor in chief Mark Galli and former advertising director Olatokunbo Olawoye, whilst their behavior remained unchecked and the men were not disciplined, according to an external assessment of the ministry's culture. Speaking to Religion News Service, Galli admitted that he may have "crossed lines" during his time as editor but denied having had "any romantic or sexual interest in anyone at Christianity Today." In an editorial on the magazine, the CEO of Christianity Today Timothy Dalrymple admitted that the society that owns and edits the magazine fell short on protecting the employees and apologized for the fact, promising strong and swift action against sexual harassment.

== Publications ==
Harold Myra, who became president and chief executive of the magazine in 1975, believed that a "family" of magazines would disperse overhead expenses and give more stability to the organization. Christianity Today both online and magazine is the flagship publication, fully effective in three basic areas: editorial, circulation, advertising; as such, many of the articles from their broader publications often get distributed through CT's flagship. Christianity Today founded or acquired periodicals during the 1980s and 1990s, beginning with Leadership, a quarterly journal for clergy, in 1980.

=== Active ===
At the ministry's web home, ChristianityToday.org, all other brands for Christian thought leaders and church leaders are featured, including publications such as the intellectual Christian review, Books & Culture, and the website for pastors and church leaders, CT Pastors. Additional web resources include Men of Integrity and Preaching Today. Many of the sections published online under the Christianity Today banner are the online legacies of defunct print publications, even named after the aforementioned publications.

==== Ekstasis (2016–present) ====
Ekstasis is a journal that was acquired by Christianity Today in 2021, originally founded in 2016 by Conor Sweetman in Toronto, Canada it focuses on Christian arts and media.

==== International editions (2007–present) ====
Besides English, it is available in thirteen other languages: Arabic, Catalan, Chinese, Filipino, French, Galician, German, Indonesian, Italian, Korean, Portuguese, Russian, and Spanish. Their publication can be found within those linguistic regions, as well as in Japan and Israel.

==== Online presence ====
The magazine's mission statement is to "provide evangelical thought leaders a sense of community, coherence, and direction through thoughtful, biblical commentary on issues and through careful, caring reporting of the news." Its presence on the Internet began in October 1994 when it became one of the top ten content providers on all of AOL. Then, in 1996, their website was launched. Originally, it was named ChristianityOnline.com before becoming ChristianityToday.com. Today ChristianityToday.com serves as the web home for Christianity Today magazine, which now has distinct sections for Local Church Pastors, Reporting, Women, History, and Spanish readers.

Together, all Christianity Today brands reach more than 2.5 million people every month when print and digital views are combined, plus more than 5 million pageviews per month on the Internet. The ministry offers access, both premium and free, to more than 100,000 articles and other content on their various websites. They operate several stand-alone websites from ChristianityToday including SmallGroups.com, Preaching Today, Church Law & Tax and many other sites.

=== Defunct ===
In 2005, Christianity Today International published 12 magazines, but following the financial downturn of 2008 it was forced to shutter several publications. By 2017 that had further diminished to three, as many of them became sections of Christianity Today proper.

==== Leadership Journal (1980–2016) ====
The first "sister publication" added to the Christianity Today publishing group was Leadership: A Practical Journal for Church Leaders, launched in 1980. The subtitle clearly defined the journal's mission: it was a quarterly publication, aimed primarily at clergy and focusing on the practical concerns of ministry and church leadership. The first issue of Leadership sold out its initial press run of 50,000 copies and the publication was in the black after a single issue. The journal continued in print for 36 years. After volume 37, issue 1 (winter 2016), Christianity Today discontinued the print publication, replacing it with expanded content in Christianity Today for pastors and church leaders and occasional print supplements, as well as a new website, CTPastors.com.

==== Campus Life/Ignite Your Faith (1982–2009) ====
In 1982, Christianity Today purchased the magazine Campus Life, aimed at a high school audience, from, Campus Life Publications, Inc., a nonprofit organization, which had purchased Campus Life magazine from Youth For Christ in 1980. The name of the magazine was changed to Ignite Your Faith in 2006. It ceased publication in 2009.

==== Partnership/Marriage Partnership (1984–2009) ====
Partnership was launched in 1984 as a magazine for wives of clergy. In 1987 it was renamed Marriage Partnership and expanded its focus to marriage in general, not just clergy marriages. The magazine ceased publication in 2009.

==== Today's Christian Woman (1985–2009) ====
Today's Christian Woman was founded in 1978 and acquired by Christianity Today from the Fleming H. Revell Co. in 1985. It discontinued print publication in 2009 and was replaced with a "digizine" entitled Kyria, which was online only, but still required a paid subscription to access, although at a lower price than the print magazine. In 2012 the name of the digital publication was changed back to Today's Christian Woman, and in 2016 it stopped being issued as a regularly scheduled digital periodical.

==== Christian History (1989–2008) ====
Christian History was a journal of the history of Christianity, first issued in January 1982 by the Christian History Institute. Each issue had multiple articles covering a single theme. Initially published annually, it became a quarterly publication. Christianity Today took over ownership of the magazine beginning with issue 22 in 1989. It was discontinued after the publication of issue 99 in 2008. In 2011 the Christian History Institute resumed quarterly publication of the magazine. Christian History archives still may be found on ChristianityToday.com under its special section.

==== Christian Reader/Today's Christian (1992–2008) ====
Christian Reader, a digest magazine in the vein of Reader's Digest, was founded in 1963 by the founder of Tyndale House Publishers, Ken Taylor. Christianity Today purchased the magazine in 1992. The name was changed to Today's Christian in 2004. In 2008, Christianity Today sold the magazine to the ministry Significant Living.

==== Books & Culture (1995–2016) ====
Books & Culture was a bimonthly book review and intellectual journal modeled after the New York Review of Books and The New York Times Book Review and was published by Christianity Today International from 1995 to 2016. At the end of its publication life in 2016, the magazine's circulation was 11,000 and its readership was 20,000. It was edited by John Wilson, and notable contributors included Mark Noll, Lauren Winner, Alan Jacobs, Jean Bethke Elshtain, and Miroslav Volf.

==== Virtue (1998–2000) ====
Virtue, a magazine for Christian women, was founded in 1978. Christianity Today purchased the publication from Cook Communications Ministries in 1998 after that publisher abruptly closed the magazine. Christianity Today revived the magazine and continued publishing it for two more years before discontinuing publication following the December/January 2000 issue.

==== Christian Parenting Today (1998–2005) ====
Christian Parenting Today (originally entitled Christian Parenting) was founded in 1989. Christianity Today purchased the magazine from Cook Communications Ministries in 1998 in the same deal in which it acquired Virtue. It ceased publication in 2005.

==== Men of Integrity (1998–2017) ====
Men of Integrity was a bi-monthly magazine for Christian men published by Christianity Today. It was created in 1998, in partnership with the evangelical men's organization Promise Keepers. It ceased publication with the November–December 2017 issue.

== Book Awards ==
Every year Christianity Today publishes a list of Christianity Today Book Awards, which are described as "Our picks for the books most likely to shape evangelical life, thought, and culture", and also selects its Christianity Today Book of the Year.
