= Ignite Your Faith =

Christian magazine for highschool students

- Editor: Chris Lutes
- Former editors: Harold Myra, Warren W. Wiersbe, Philip Yancey
- Categories: Teen magazine, Christianity
- Frequency: Quarterly
- Circulation: 100,000
- First issue: 1944
- Final issue: 2009
- Company: Christianity Today
- Country: United States
- Based in: Carol Stream, Illinois
- Language: English
- ISSN: 1558-7770
- OCLC: 62217913

Ignite Your Faith was a print magazine for Christian high school students. Founded in 1944 as Youth for Christ Magazine, its name was changed to Campus Life in 1965 and to Ignite Your Faith in 2006. It officially shut down in 2009.

== History ==
Youth for Christ magazine was founded in 1944 as an organ of the network of independent evangelistic youth rallies that was coalescing into the organization Youth for Christ (YFC). In the early years, the publication focused on the evangelistic programs of its parent organization, featuring coverage of YFC's international efforts and the rise to fame of Billy Graham, who had begun his career as an evangelist employed by YFC. In the 1950s and beyond it expanded its focus to discussing current cultural and social concerns from a Christian perspective. In October 1965, the name of the magazine was changed to Campus Life, the same name YFC had begun using for its local high school clubs.

In July 1982, the magazine was sold to Christianity Today, Inc., which changed the name to Ignite Your Faith in January 2006. Writers and editors who served at Campus Life and Ignite Your Faith include Philip Yancey, Warren Wiersbe, Dawson McAllister, Stephen R. Lawhead, Gregg Lewis, James P. Long, Chris Lutes, Jay Kesler, Dean Merrill, Harold Myra, Paul Robbins, and Tim Stafford. In January 2009, Christianity Today International announced that it was ending publication of Ignite Your Faith after the Spring 2009 issue. The March 2009 edition of Christianity Today described the decision to discontinue the print publication as product of "general belt-tightening efforts demanded by the current economy" and assured readers that the publication would continue in online form.
