= AOH =

AOH can refer to:

- Ancient Order of Hibernians
- Ambassadors of Harmony
- Academy of hope
- Lima Allen County Airport
- Telegram code of Shanghai Hongqiao railway station
