= House church =

Private Christian gathering

Part of a series on
- Protestantism

Theology & Principles
- Five Solas; Sola scriptura • Sola fide • Sola gratia Solus Christus • Soli Deo gloria Priesthood of all believers

History
- Reformation • Proto-Protestantism; Ninety-five Theses • Augsburg Confession; Puritans • Pietism • Great Awakening

Major Branches
- Lutheranism • Calvinism • Anglicanism; Baptists • Methodism • Pentecostalism; Anabaptists • Evangelicalism

Reformers
- Martin Luther • John Calvin; Huldrych Zwingli • Philip Melanchthon; John Wesley • John Knox

A house church or home church is a label used to describe a group of Christians who regularly gather for worship in private homes. The group may be part of a larger Christian body, such as a parish, but some have been independent groups that see the house church as the primary form of Christian community.

Some recent Christian writers like Francis Chan have supported the view that the Christian Church should meet in houses, and have based the operation of their communities around multiple small home meetings. Other Christian groups choose to meet in houses when they are in the early phases of church growth or when membership is small, because a house is the most affordable option for the small group to meet until the number of people attending the group is sufficient to warrant moving to a commercial location such as a church building. (as in the beginning phase of the British New Church Movement). Sometimes this meeting style is advantageous because the group is a member of a Christian congregation which is otherwise banned from meeting as is the case in China and Iran. House church organizations claim that this approach is preferable to public meetings in dedicated buildings because it is a more effective way of building community and personal relationships, and it helps the group to engage in outreach more naturally. Some believe small churches were a deliberate apostolic pattern in the first century, and they were intended by Christ.

== Origins ==
In the early church, Christian fellowship, prayer, and service took place mainly in private homes, as described in the book of Acts of the Apostles. The Latin term often used is domus ecclesiae.

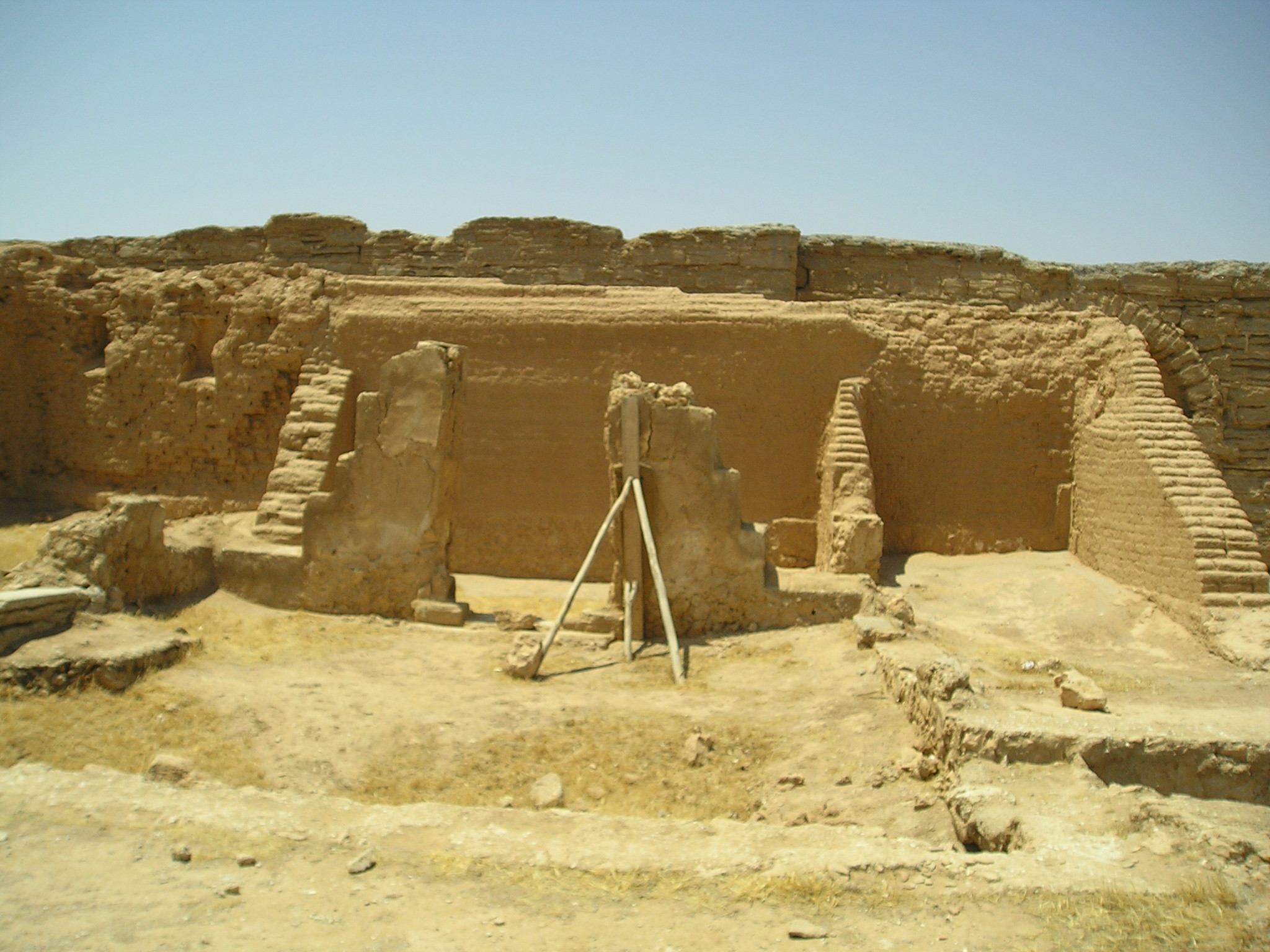
The Dura-Europos house church, c. 232, with chapel area on right

Several passages in the New Testament specifically mention churches meeting in houses. The first house church is recorded in Acts 1:13, where the disciples of Jesus met together in the "Upper Room" of a house, traditionally believed to be where the Cenacle is today. "The churches of Asia greet you, especially Aquila and Prisca greet you much in the Lord, along with the church that is in their house." I Corinthians 16:19. The church meeting in the house of Priscilla and Aquila is again mentioned in Romans 16:3, 5. The church that meets in the house of Nymphas is also cited in the Bible: "Greet the brethren in Laodicea, and Nymphas, and the church which is in her house." Colossians 4:15. There is another reference to the church meeting in Philemon's home ("To Philemon our dear friend and fellow worker—also to Apphia our sister and Archippus our fellow soldier—and to the church that meets in your home:...." Philemon 1:2), but scholars recognize this as simply the meeting place of the Corinthian church—not a separately-meeting house church.

For the first 300 years of Early Christianity, until Constantine legalized Christianity and churches moved into larger buildings, Christians typically met in homes, if only because intermittent persecution (before the Edict of Milan in 313) did not allow the erection of public church buildings. Clement of Alexandria, an early church father, wrote of worshipping in a house. The Dura-Europos church, a private house in Dura-Europos in Syria, was excavated in the 1930s and was found to have been used as a Christian meeting place in AD 232, with one small room serving as a baptistry creating the current style church seen today.

== Modern History ==
During the 20th and 21st centuries, in some countries of the world which apply sharia law or have communist governments, government authorizations for worship are complex for Christians. Because of persecution of Christians, Evangelical house churches are the only option for many Christians to live their faith in community. For example, there is the Evangelical house churches movement in China. The meetings take place in private houses, in secret and illegally.

=== In China ===
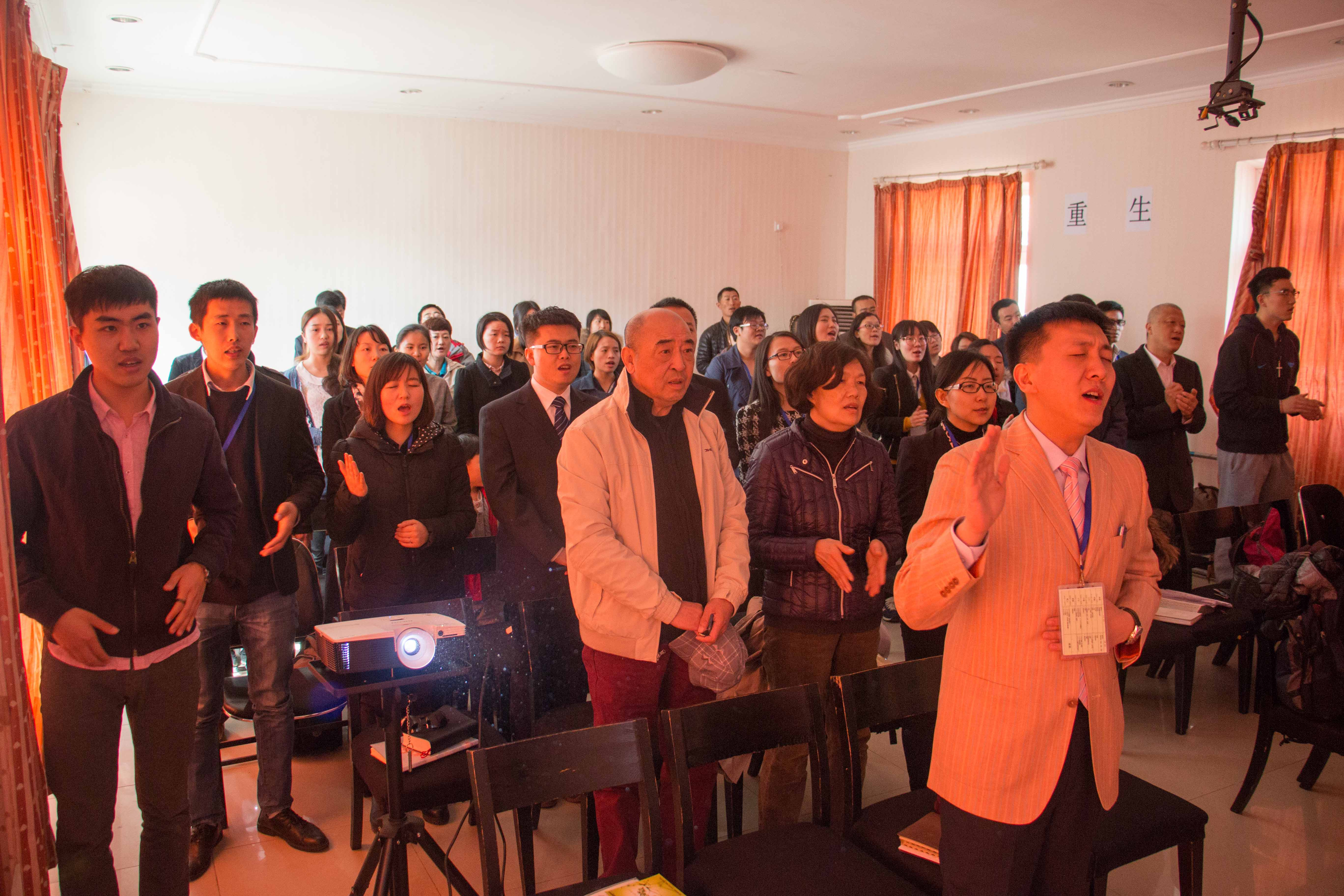
A house church in Shunyi, Beijing

In the People's Republic of China (PRC), house churches or family churches (Chinese: 家庭教会; pinyin: jiātíng jiàohuì) are Protestant assemblies that operate independently from the state-sanctioned Three-Self Patriotic Movement (TSPM) and China Christian Council (CCC), and came into existence due to the change in religious policy after the end of the Cultural Revolution in the early 1980s. The TSPM was set up after the Communist Party established the PRC in 1949, for Protestants to declare their patriotism and support of the new government. However, by the time of the Cultural Revolution (1966–1976), all public religious practice came to an end; the government of the People's Republic of China officially espouses state atheism, and has conducted antireligious campaigns to this end. Many churches, temples and mosques were destroyed during the Cultural Revolution, which also criminalized the possession of religious texts. Due to the changes in religious policy after the end of the Cultural Revolution, in 1980, the TSPM was reinstated and the China Christian Council was formed. Protestant congregations that wished to worship publicly registered with the TSPM, but those that did not were eventually termed house churches.

=== Revivals ===
Recent developments in the house church movement in North America and the United Kingdom are often seen as a return to a New Testament church restorationist paradigm, a restoration of God's eternal purpose, and the natural expression of Christ on Earth, urging Christians to reject hierarchy and rank, and return to practices described and encouraged in Scripture. According to some proponents, many churchgoers are turning to house churches because traditional churches fail to meet their relational needs and are not representative of the structure exhibited throughout the Acts of the Apostles and Epistles of the New Testament.

Some authors who are often associated with "house church" by others (for example Jon Zens and Frank Viola) consider the term "house church" to be a misnomer, asserting that the main issue for Christians who gather together is not the location of the meeting, but whether or not Jesus Christ is the functional head of the gathering and face-to-face community is occurring. Other names which may be used to describe these kinds of churches simple church, "relational church", "primitive church", "body life", "organic church" or "biblical church". Some authors do not believe "house church" or "organic church" are "movements", and they distinguish between a house church/simple church and an organic expression of the church.

House churches can adopt an organic church philosophy, which is not necessarily a particular method, technique or movement, but rather a particular church expression that the group takes on when the organization is functioning according to the pattern of a living organism. The church represented in the New Testament is based on this principle, and both traditional & contemporary versions of "Westernized" Christianity has reversed this order.

The origins of the modern house church movement in North America and the UK are varied. Some have viewed it as a development and logical extension of the Plymouth Brethren movement, both in doctrine and practice. Many individuals and assemblies have adopted new approaches to worship and governance, while others recognize a relationship to the Anabaptists, the Free Christians, the Quakers, the Amish, the Hutterites, the Mennonites, the Moravians, the Methodists, the much earlier conventicles movement, the Waldenses or the Priscillianists. Another perspective sees the house church movement as a re-emergence of the move of the Holy Spirit during the Jesus Movement of the 1970s in the US or the worldwide Charismatic Renewal of the late 1960s and 1970s. Others believe that the House Church movement was pioneered by the Reverend Ernest Southcott in the 1950s, when he was Vicar of St Wilfred's Church in Halton, Leeds, in England. Southcott believed that if people would not come to church, the church must go to the people, and his book The Parish Comes Alive spread this idea widely among Anglicans.

Limited financial resources can encourage church leaders to rethink the pattern of ministry and look for ways to forward the outreach of the church with unpaid members.

== Simple church ==
The simple church is an Evangelical Christian movement that reinterprets the nature and practice of church. A simple church may meet anywhere with or without trained leaders, formal liturgy, programs or structures. To facilitate relationship, discipleship (spiritual formation), multiplication, mobility, and member ownership, a simple church is usually a small group of no more than 20–25 persons. Most Church "programs" privately meet during some days of the week and discuss troubles that they are having with their faith, and personal life. Church "programs" are virtually nonexistent and small group participation is essential. The process of moving from worship to small group, small group to mission work, and mission work to worship is a primary focus.

Authors Tony and Felicity Dale, founders of House2House Ministries, have promoted the term "simple church" in their book "Simply Church". The term is often used interchangeably with other terms like organic church, essential church, primitive church, bodylife, relational church, and micro-church.

In the early twenty-first century a number of established Christian denominations and mission organizations have officially supported efforts to develop house church networks.

=== Origins and influences ===
The simple church movement is part of the broader house church movement. Simple church has also been influenced by overseas missions and the growth of church planting movements. Church planting movements are spontaneously growing church multiplication efforts.

The missional Movement has also influenced simple church.

=== Values ===
As in any decentralized, spontaneous movement, a variety of values are expressed in simple church. Due to the influence of some key groups and Acts 2:42–47, three overarching values have emerged in many circles. Adherents Paul Kaak (who began ministry in one of the largest and most systematized mega-churches in America) and Neil Cole originally articulated these values using the letters DNA. According to him:

- D – Divine Truth: Truth is the foundation for everything.
- N – Nurturing Relationships: Healthy relationships are what make up a family. Love for one another is to be a constant pursuit of the family of God.
- A – Apostolic Mission: Apostolic means, simply, "sent".

These values have since been promoted by House2House Ministries and DAWN North America, and have been adopted by various groups such as New York's MetroSoul

=== Practices ===
Adherents of George Barna and Frank Viola's book Pagan Christianity point out a number of reforms that organic churches often advocate.

- The belief that modern clergy is a vestige of Roman pagan religion that was absent from the early church and is largely at odds with the true priesthood of all believers. The movement sees the institution of the clergy at odds with passages like Matthew 20, Matthew 23, 3rd John, and the message in Revelation regarding the deeds of the Nicolaitans (Greek-literally those who triumph over the people). 1 Corinthians 12–14 paints a picture of an every-member functioning church meeting entirely at odds with the modern religious service which is performed by professionals for an audience. However, some believe this view does not take into account the Jewish and synagogue based nature of the ekklesia, which explains the talk of elders and deacons found in the New Testament. In reply, many simple churches do recognize elders and deacons according to the biblical standards laid out in Timothy and Titus but believe these people emerge over time as their character becomes descriptive of these roles. In an environment where people are free to express their gifts, such people can emerge. Also, being an elder or deacon does not mean this person dominates the meeting. 3 John rebukes Diotrephes the elder who had to be first and was dominating. The simple church largely believes the idea that an elder or deacon is not a license for some to minister and others to be passive.
- Valuing the Lord's Supper occurring as a regular, recurring full meal celebration rather than a short religious ritual. The early integration of the home based ritual into the public synagogue-like meeting functioned to reduce the symbolic nature of the act to a private moment, replacing its symbolism of fellowship and dedication to the Lord. This was complete by the time of Constantine, when home based agape feasts were banned. However, this history does not in itself devalue the need for the larger synagogue-like meeting for prayer, ministry of the word and singing. Simple church adherents also enjoy occasional and even monthly larger gatherings that do this very thing, though they emphasize the smaller meeting of the ekklesia as the environment for spiritual growth.
- Organic churches tend to place less emphasis on the building or meeting place. To this end, Neil Cole, an adherent of simple church, states that "buildings, budgets, and big shots", tend to do more to contain Christianity than allow it to spread. However, this statement against larger sized churches does nothing to substantiate its claim.

=== Media and popular attention ===
In the early twenty-first century the growth of the movement had increased news media coverage during the early 2000s. However, the house church movement saw a resurgence following the COVID-19 epidemic, after Christian believers were forced to meet in more intimate, home-like settings, and after the traditional Westernized church model seemed to fail to meet members' needs during and after the epidemic:

Many books have been written on the simple church movement, especially by insiders (see House Church, Further Reading). In the early twenty-first century, books began to appear by those studying the movement from a more objective view, including George Barna's Revolution. Barna says that "revolutionary" expressions such as simple church will soon account for one third of American spirituality.

Visibility of the movement also increased due to national and regional gatherings of various kinds. Among which include the Church Without Walls International in Broken Arrow, Oklahoma, US, and various other locations throughout the US.

=== Criticism ===
How the simple church movement relates to constructing a theology and ecclesiology is the subject of much debate, especially with critics of the movement.

Several prominent voices have serious concerns about simple church. For example, J. Lee Grady (Charisma Online Editor) says such a movement wants to "reinvent the church without its biblical structure and New Testament order—and without the necessary people who are anointed and appointed by God to lead it. To follow this defective thesis to its logical conclusion would require us to fire all pastors, close all seminaries and Bible colleges, padlock our sanctuaries and send everybody home..." Grady and other critics worry that the simple church movement could encourage people to leave more traditional forms of church, which could lead to further collapse or decline of Christendom.

== See also ==
- Cafe church
- Church planting
- House church (China)
- House concert
- Local churches (affiliation)
- Missional church
- Pub church
- Restorationism (Christian primitivism)
- Schuilkerk – A type of house church in 17th and 18th century Netherlands
- Two by Twos – also known as Cooneyites, Christian Conventions, Meetings, Workers and Friends, The Way or The Truth
