= Statue of George Whitefield =

Former public statue in Philadelphia

The Reverend George Whitefield
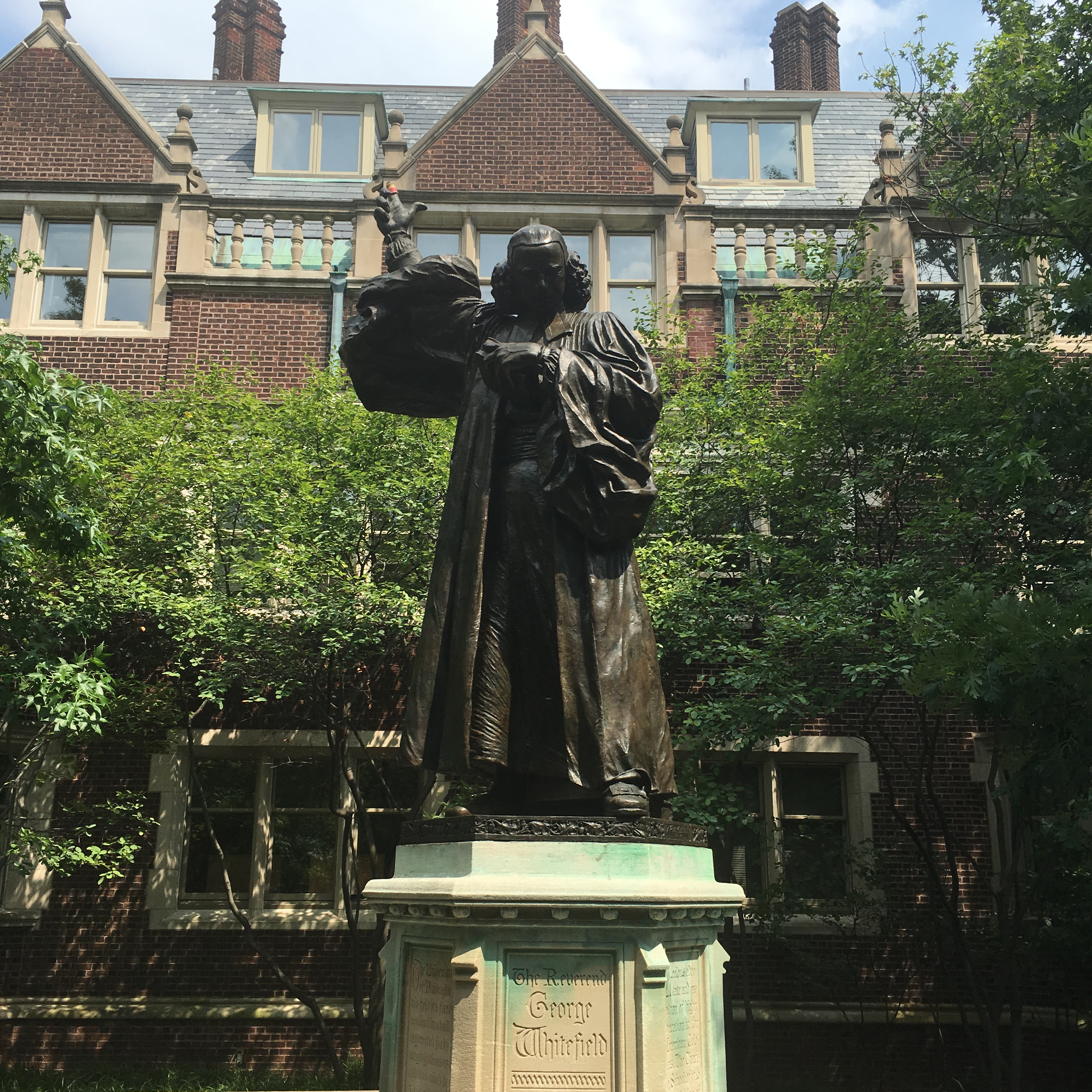
- The statue in 2016
- Interactive map of The Reverend George Whitefield
- Location: University of Pennsylvania, Philadelphia, Pennsylvania, United States
- Coordinates: 39°57′1.5″N 75°11′50.5″W
- Designer: R. Tait McKenzie
- Type: Statue
- Material: Bronze; Concrete; Limestone; Stone
- Length: 2 feet (0.61 m)
- Width: 3.5 feet (1.1 m)
- Height: 185.5 inches (4.71 m)
- Beginning date: 1917
- Completion date: 1918
- Dedicated date: June 15, 1919
- Dedicated to: George Whitefield

The Reverend George Whitefield is a monumental statue which once stood on the campus of the University of Pennsylvania in Philadelphia, Pennsylvania, United States. Dedicated in 1919, it was designed by sculptor R. Tait McKenzie and honors its namesake George Whitefield, Anglican cleric who was a founder of Methodism. In 2020, in reaction to the George Floyd protests, the university administration removed the statue due to Whitefield's defense of chattel slavery.

== Design ==
The monument consisted of a bronze statue of Whitefield measuring 8 feet (2.4 m) tall and with widths of 3.5 feet (1.1 m) and 2 feet (0.61 m). Whitefield is standing with a Bible in his left hand and his right hand raised. For his depiction of Whitefield, McKenzie chose to show him as a young man. This statue stood on a three-part pedestal, with the upper limestone part having a height of 68 inches (1.7 m), the middle stone part 16.25 inches (41.3 cm), and the bottom concrete and stone part 5.25 inches (13.3 cm). The upper and middle parts of the pedestal were hexagonal and increased in diameter from top to bottom, while the bottom part was round with flat faces on the front and back. The upper base bears inscriptions on both its front and back, with the front reading "The Reverend/George/Whitefield/Bachelor of Arts/1736/Pembroke College/Oxford" and the back reading "Humble Dis-/ciple/of Jesus Christ/Eloquent/Preacher of the/Gospel". The monument bore the inscription, "The University of Pennsylvania held its first session in a building erected for his congregation and was aided by his collections, guided by his counsel, and inspired by his life." It is located near the Quadrangle Dormitories.

== History ==
=== Dedication ===
George Whitefield was an evangelist active in the Methodist movement of the mid-1700s. During a trip to the Thirteen Colonies between 1739 and 1741, he preached in Philadelphia in a small building that had been built for that purpose. Following Whitefield's sermons, the building would be used by Benjamin Franklin as the location for a new institution of higher learning, which would eventually become the University of Pennsylvania. Around 1914, the bicentenary of Whitefield's birth, there was a push to erect a statue in his honor. The previous year, during a meeting in New York City, Methodist members of the university's alumni association discussed the possibility of erecting a statue of Whitefield, and the following year, the provost of the University of Pennsylvania gave a speech in his honor that contributed to the movement. In 1914, R. Tait McKenzie, a sculptor and the university's director of physical education, was commissioned for the project,, and he began working on a design for the statue by 1917. The statue would be one of several that McKenzie would make for the university, including a statue of Edgar Fahs Smith and one of Franklin. In researching Whitefield, McKenzie sought out as many portraits as he could find of the man, traveling to Boston and London in the process. By 1918, the casting for the statue was completed. A dedication was set for the university's Alumni Day, June 15, 1919. (Note: Several sources give the dedication date as June 15, though one gives a date of June 22.) At the unveiling, Wallace MacMullen, D.D. gave a speech that chronicled Whitefield's life and his contributions to evangelism, while a choir played the hymn "For Famous Men", which included verses that honored Whitefield. The monument was a whole gift from the Methodist Alumni Committee to the university.

In 1992, the statue was surveyed as part of the Save Outdoor Sculpture! project.

=== Removal ===
On July 2, 2020, the university administration announced that the statue of Whitefield would be removed. In the statement issued by University President Amy Gutmann, Provost Wendell Pritchett, and Vice President Craig Carnaroli, they highlighted Whitefield's support of slavery and his successful push to legalize slavery in the Province of Georgia. Concerning the statue, they stated that "[h]onoring him with a statue on our campus is inconsistent with our University's core values" and that "there is absolutely no justification for having a statue honoring him at Penn". The statement also noted that several other people involved in the creation and conduct of the university had enslaved people, including Franklin, but that, unlike Whitefield, Franklin later changed his opinions on slavery and became an abolitionist. In the same announcement, the university declared the creation of the Campus Iconography Group, which would study other pieces of university iconography and report to the university administration. The move came after the murder of George Floyd amidst the subsequent George Floyd protests, which contributed to a nationwide racial reckoning in the United States. Around this time, Princeton University, another Ivy League university, had announced that it would be renaming a building that had been named after U.S. President Woodrow Wilson due to his racist views, while in Philadelphia, a statue of Frank Rizzo near Philadelphia City Hall was removed due to his racist actions. About a month before this, on June 19, The Daily Pennsylvanian (the university's student newspaper) had published an opinion piece that called for the statue to be removed. Less than a year before this, the same author had opined that the statue should remain, but with additional markers that contextualized the statue.

== Sources ==
- Allen, H. Merian (August 1918). "Whitefield Coming to Old Penn". The International Studio. LXV (258). John Lane Company: XLII–XLIV.
- "The Rev. George Whitefield by R. Tait McKenzie". The American Magazine of Art. X (10). American Federation of Arts: 393. August 1919.
- Ferree, Barr, ed. (1920). Year Book of the Pennsylvania Society. The Pennsylvania Society.
- Gooding, Jessica (October 6, 2019). "Critically examining George Whitefield's statue in the Quad". The Daily Pennsylvanian. Archived from the original on October 18, 2021.
- Gooding, Jessica (June 19, 2020). "Take down the George Whitefield statue". The Daily Pennsylvanian. Archived from the original on October 18, 2021.
- Gutmann, Amy; Pritchett, Wendell; Carnaroli, Craig (July 2, 2020). "Penn announces plans to remove statue of George Whitefield and forms working group to study campus names and iconography". Penn Today. Archived from the original on July 28, 2021.
- Hassler, Donna J. (2001). "Robert Tait McKenzie (1867–1938)". In Tolles, Thayer (ed.). American Sculpture in the Metropolitan Museum of Art. Vol. 2: A Catalogue of Works by Artists Born between 1865 and 1885. Metropolitan Museum of Art. Yale University Press. pp. 503–505. ISBN 978-0-87099-923-9.
- Kidd, Thomas S. (2014). George Whitefield: America's Spiritual Founding Father. Yale University Press. ISBN 978-0-300-18162-3.
- MacMullen, Wallace (July 3, 1919). "George Whitefield". Christian Advocate. XCIV (27). Methodist Episcopal Church: 840–841, 863.
- "R. Tait McKenzie". Exhibition of American Sculpture Catalogue. National Sculpture Society. 1923. pp. 166–167.
- "The Reverend George Whitefield, (sculpture)". Smithsonian Institution Research Information System. Archived from the original on October 18, 2021.
- Snyder, Susan (July 2, 2020). "Penn to remove statue of slavery supporter, forms group to look at campus iconography". The Philadelphia Inquirer. Archived from the original on February 26, 2021.
- Weisman, Zoey (July 2, 2020). "Penn announces plan to remove statue of slave owner George Whitefield from the Quad". The Daily Pennsylvanian. Archived from the original on April 1, 2021.
