= Harold Myra =

American journalist

Harold Lawrence Myra
- Born: 1939 (age 86–87); Camden, New Jersey, U.S.
- Occupations: Journalist, publishing executive
- Known for: Chief executive of Christianity Today

Harold Lawrence Myra (born 1939 in Camden, New Jersey) is an American journalist and publishing executive who was the chief executive of Christianity Today for 32 years. Before coming to Christianity Today, he edited the magazine Campus Life. He is the author, co-author, or editor of multiple books in a variety of genres, including speculative fiction, children's books, and non-fiction.

== Campus Life ==
Myra joined Youth For Christ Magazine as an associate editor in 1961, shortly after graduating from college, and was appointed the editor of the publication in 1965. Soon after the name of the magazine was changed to Campus Life. Myra quickly improved the art direction and diversified the subject coverage of the magazine for a more professional-looking publication with four-color covers and more photographs. Under his editorship, the magazine shifted from being primarily a house organ for the Youth For Christ organization to a general interest teen magazine for Christians. Campus Life became a major advertising venue for Christian Colleges. During Myra's tenure, the circulation grew from 30,000 to 160,000.

== Christianity Today ==
In 1975 at the age 35, Myra moved from Campus Life to become the president and publisher of Christianity Today, which had come close to bankruptcy in the early 1970s following an unsuccessful venture into book publishing. Within three years, Myra had led the magazine to become a profitable enterprise through changes such as raising subscription prices, cutting unpaid circulation, and moving the headquarters of the publication from Washington, D.C. to Carol Stream, Illinois. Myra thought that the health of the magazine depended on the effective functioning of three key areas of operation: editorial, circulation, and advertising.

Beginning in 1980, Christianity Today expanded its stable of publications by founding or acquiring other magazines, growing to a "family" of as many as 13 periodicals. It also experimented with other media, including a subscription service of sermons delivered on audio cassettes. In the mid-1990s, Christianity Today launched its online presence as a content provider for America Online.

Lyle Schaller called CTI under Myra's leadership "one of the most remarkable success stories in American Christianity during the second half of the 20th century."

Myra retired from Christianity Today in 2007.

== Books ==
Myra is the author of five novels, multiple children's books, poetry, and nonfiction.

== Honors and awards ==
- Honorary doctorates: Biola University, Gordon College.
- James Deforest Murch Award from the National Association of Evangelicals
- Joseph T. Bayly Award for Outstanding Service (lifetime achievement award in Christian journalism) from the Evangelical Press Association, 2000.
- Mark O. Hatfield Leadership Award from the Council for Christian Colleges & Universities, 2003.
