= Horfield United Reformed Church, Bristol =

Church in England

Coordinates: 51.4576°N 2.5863°W

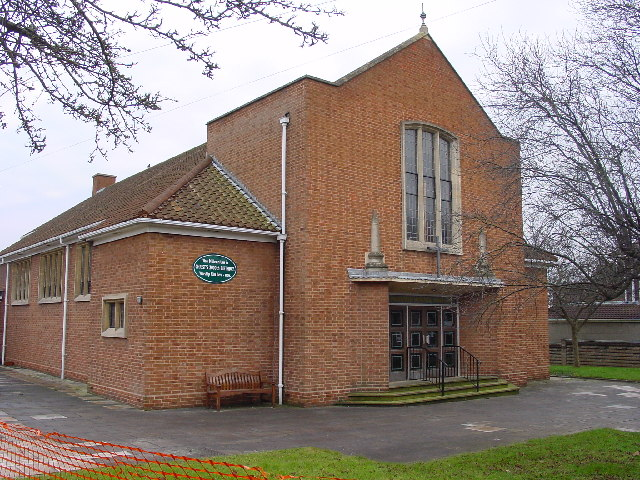
Horfield United Reformed Church (2006)

Whitefield's Tabernacle, a church in Penn Street, Bristol, opened in 1753 for the followers of George Whitefield.

It was replaced in 1957 by the Whitefield Memorial Tabernacle, in Muller Road, Horfield, Bristol, now the home of Horfield United Reformed Church. The work in Muller Road had started in 1930, but larger buildings were facilitated by compensation by Bristol City Council for the redevelopment of the site of the Penn Street church.
