= Cafe church =

Christian church model

A cafe church is a Christian church centered in cafés. These edifices are associated with alternative worship and the emerging church movements, and seek to find new forms and approaches to existing as a church in the 21st century. These churches are often focused on relationship aspects of Christian fellowship and outreach to their local community, and use the modern gathering place of a café in their ministry.

== Philosophy and planting churches ==
The cafe church can be viewed as an organically based philosophy for planting churches, centered around the idea of making the message of Christ's love relevant to the needs of the local community that the church seeks to serve.

The Alma Mount Hope Coffeehouse Church, of Alma, Michigan, says:

The ministry statement for AMH Coffeehouse Church is found in Acts 2:42: "And they continued steadfastly in the apostles' doctrine and fellowship, in the breaking of bread, and in prayers."

The goal of cafe church endeavors is to impact their local community with a message of God's love and the transforming power of Christ's love.

Depending on the leadership, some cafe church leaders will provide a clear doctrinal perspective, while others may be more open-minded and comfortable with members and visitors asking questions of speakers.

For example, One World Coffeehouse in Columbia, Maryland, was founded by a church member who said, "I felt that our church needed an outreach effort ... and a way to express principles such as multiculturalism and acceptance of others different from yourself."

And the Glebe Café Church, in New South Wales, Australia, states that:

Café Church is a Glebe-based, non-traditional Christian faith community. We aim to provide an inclusive, accepting and welcoming space for everybody, no matter what their spiritual path. Café Church revolves around open discussion, creative expression and alternative approaches to worship. Our core values include hospitality, creativity, discipleship and social and environmental justice.

== Forms ==
Churches using the cafe as a model for their organization can take different forms. Some cafe churches maintain a permanent cafe or restaurant, which offers the local community a high-quality array of coffee, sandwiches, and food, and provides a venue where the members of the church fellowship meet. Church members may also volunteer their time to support the enterprise.

Other churches simply use the cafe model as a way to build community, facilitating variation within their normal service structure and within the confines of their building, by serving coffee after or during the service in a predesignated area, or holding a coffeehouse event.

== Operational choices ==
Ebenezer's Coffeehouse, in Washington, DC, operated by the National Community Church, is one example of a cafe church. Its website asks, "How much more comfortable can you get sipping a chai in church?" This church is a multi-location church located at sites accessible by public transit, which links its indie music coffeehouse broadcasts to other locations via the Internet.

Also located in Washington is the Potters House, an outreach ministry of the Church of the Savior. Its website states, "We, the members of that church, asked ourselves, 'Would Jesus want to hang out with folks at a traditional institutional church or would he want to hang out over a beer in a bar or coffee in a restaurant?' The resounding answer was the latter. We chose coffee over beer because of our support for the budding AA movement in 1960."

The Abbey is a ministry of the Episcopal Diocese of Alabama which opened in Birmingham's Avondale neighborhood in 2015. After operating as both a coffeeshop and worshiping congregation for over four years, the coffeehouse was closed in mid-2019. The Abbey continues to operate a six-day-a-week ministry with pay-as-you-can breakfast on weekdays and Sunday worship services.

An old congregation house of Oxford University, dating back to 1320, is home to The Vaults and Garden Cafe, operated by the University Church of St Mary the Virgin, which specializes in organically grown and locally sourced foods. The cafe serves the community by catering events, and donating funds. Another religious organization specializing in healthy food is the International Society for Krishna Consciousness, which runs a chain of vegetarian restaurants called Govinda's.

The Loft coffeehouse, a project of Alamo Heights United Methodist Church, San Antonio, Texas, includes "a food bank, thrift store and a resource center for the needy."

Café churches became more popular in the Christian community of South Korea around 2016, especially among younger Protestants, as an alternative to the traditional Korean megachurches' conservatism and perceived corruption.

== History ==
Church-sponsored coffeehouses have a long history in the United States. For example, Nameless Coffeehouse has operated for over 50 years (since 1966) on the site of The First Parish Unitarian Universalist Church in Cambridge, Massachusetts. And fifty years ago, it was The Sacred Mushroom coffeehouse in Columbus, Ohio that hosted Phil Ochs; a local fan reminisced, "One of his first public performances as a solo artist was at the First Unitarian Universalist Church on Weisheimer Road, where he performed for a ladies luncheon," she said with a laugh ... "God only knows the songs he performed there." In fact, Unitarian Universalists are a denomination particularly known for sponsoring folk coffeehouses.

"The welcoming environment of Unitarian Universalist coffeehouses has provided an artistic haven for a variety of performers and helped launch the entertainment careers of folk musicians such as Pete Seeger and Arlo Guthrie.

Folk music is featured at The Old Ship Coffeehouse Off the Square, located in the parish house of Old Ship Church in Hingham, Massachusetts, (which is, incidentally, "the oldest English church in continuous use in America.")

The First Congregational Church in Branford, Connecticut sponsors the Branford Folk Coffeehouse, a monthly folk music concert series held in its auditorium.

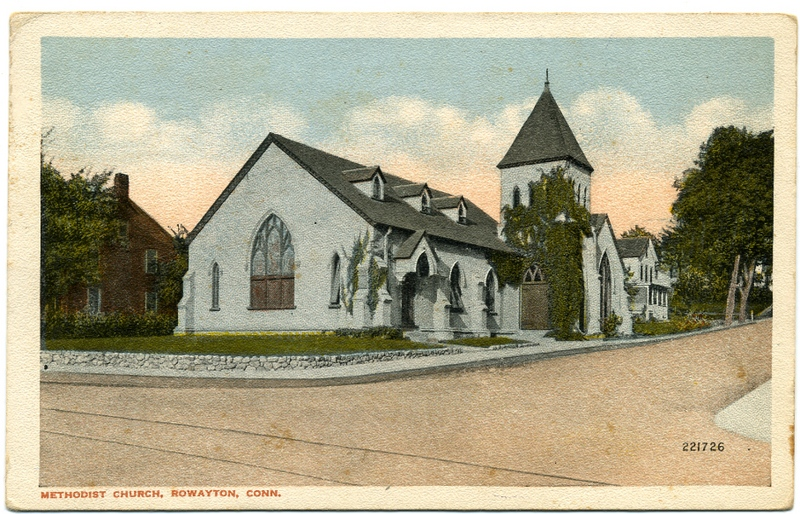
Rowayton United Methodist Church, home to Good Folk Coffeehouse

Mom & Pop's Coffeehouse, a folk concert series held in the sanctuary at United Christian Church in Levittown, Pennsylvania, uses the altar as the stage, and has been held since 1994.

And in 2011, the Good Folk Coffeehouse began its 21st concert season at the Rowayton United Methodist Church, in Rowayton, Connecticut.

== See also ==
- Cell group
- Emerging Church
- Missional Christianity
- Pub church
