= John Gillies (minister) =

John Gillies (1712–1796) was a Church of Scotland minister and theological writer.

== Life ==
John Gillies was born at the manse of Careston, near Brechin, where his father, John Gillies, was minister. He took literary and divinity courses at university, and after a time as tutor in several families, he became minister of the College Church, Glasgow on 29 July 1742. In this charge he remained till his death fifty-four years after (29 March 1796). He preached three times every Sunday, delivered discourses in his church three times a week, published for some time a weekly paper, and visited and catechised his parish.

== Works ==
Gillies is best known for Historical Collections relating to the Success of the Gospel, 2 vols. Glasgow, 1754; an appendix was added in 1761, and a supplement in 1786 which had a biography of Gillies by Dr. John Erskine prefixed. It was later updated by Horatius Bonar. This work was an important contribution to the historiography of the First Great Awakening. From a collection of 30 to 40 documented local religious revivals of the previous several decades, Gillies put together a narrative from both sides of the Atlantic, in a context starting at the first Pentecost. Apart from Methodism it dealt also with some groups in the Netherlands and Germany.

Another major work was Devotional Exercises on the New Testament, 2 vols. London, 1769. He published also:

- ‘Exhortations to the Inhabitants of the South Parish of Glasgow,’ 2 vols. Glasgow, 1750;
- Gillies, John (1772). Life of the Rev. Mr. George Whitefield. New Haven: Whitmore & Buckingham and H. Mansfield.
- ‘Essays on the Prophecies relating to the Messiah,’ Edinburgh, 1773;
- ‘Hebrew Manual for the use of Students;’
- ‘Psalms of David,’ with notes, Glasgow, 1786; and
- John Milton's Paradise Lost, illustrated by texts of scripture, London, 1778.

He wrote a life of John MacLaurin for MacLaurin's ‘Sermons and Essays,’ Glasgow, 1755.

== Family ==
His first wife was Elizabeth (d. 1754), daughter of John MacLaurin, known as a preacher; and his second, Joanna (d. 1792), sister of Sir Michael Stewart of Blackhall.

== Notes ==
Attribution

This article incorporates text from a publication now in the public domain: "Gillies, John (1712-1796)". Dictionary of National Biography. London: Smith, Elder & Co. 1885–1900.
