= Academy of Hope =

- Founded: 1985
- Location: Washington, DC

Academy of Hope (AOH) is a non-profit organization, involved in providing "educational empowerment" to Washington, DC adults. The organization was founded in 1985 by Church of the Saviour volunteers.

== Services ==
Academy of Hope provides adult basic education leading to improved literacy, the GED certificate, other high school diploma programs (External Diploma Program), and computer training. Students are typically adults with limited or no income who are under-educated or lack the educational skills for employment. About 350 students have received high school credentials through the academy, taking an average of two years but as long as ten years in a few cases.

== Funding ==
Academy of Hope receives funding from private donors and foundations as well as $170,000 a year in federal and D.C. funds earmarked to fight adult illiteracy. A 2007 renovation and move was paid for in part by a $200,000 grant from Oprah Winfrey's Angel Network.
