= Mark Galli =

American author and editor

Mark Galli (born August 24, 1952) is an American Catholic author and editor, and former Protestant minister. For seven years he was editor in chief of Christianity Today.

== Biography ==
Galli, a native of California, was raised as a Catholic, but became a born-again Evangelical at the age of thirteen. He subsequently graduated at the University of California, Santa Cruz and received a M.Div. from Fuller Theological Seminary. He was a Presbyterian pastor for ten years, but later converted to Evangelical Anglicanism, joining the Episcopal Church and moving to the Anglican Church in North America in 2009.

Moving into journalism, he was the associate editor of Leadership and editor of Christian History, a sister publication of Christianity Today. For the next 20 years he worked for Christianity Today in various capacities, including seven years as editor in chief. In October 2019 he announced he would retire effective January 3, 2020.

He wrote books and editorials about the nature of evangelicalism, including how belief relates to political activity. In 2011, Roger E. Olson, a theologian specializing in Christian ethics, described Galli as, "a serious evangelical scholar with an irenic approach to controversial material", that being defined as favoring and operating toward peace, moderation, or conciliation.

In 2020, Galli announced that he had rejoined the Catholic Church and was confirmed in the Catholic faith on 13 September 2020 by Bishop Richard Pates in the Cathedral of St. Raymond Nonnatus in Joliet.

On November 4, 2022, Galli announced in his newsletter that he was taking an extended sabbatical from writing and public life to concentrate on artistic pursuits.

== Controversies ==
On December 19, 2019, a day after the U.S. House of Representatives voted to file two articles of impeachment against President Donald Trump, Galli wrote an editorial entitled, "Trump Should Be Removed from Office." The publication noted that the criticisms of Trump were consistent with the magazine's approach to the impeachment proceedings of presidents Richard Nixon and Bill Clinton.

On 15 March 2022, Christianity Today published an article denouncing “demeaning, inappropriate, and offensive behavior” by Galli during his tenure as editor of the magazine, using anonymous sources. Speaking to Religion News Service, Galli denied the serious charges and offered to meet with his accusers to seek reconciliation.

Rod Dreher wrote in The American Conservative that Christianity Today's investigation on Galli raises great concerns. In his article Dreher quotes the views of others that Galli has been victimized by a shallow attempt at justice. "Due process involves presumption of innocence, right to face your accuser, opportunity to mount a defense, rules of evidence, witnesses, etc."

== Books ==
- With Craig Brian Larson, Preaching that Connects, Zondervan, 1994, ISBN 978-0-31038621-6
- With James Stuart Bell Jr., The Complete Idiot's Guide to Prayer, Alpha Books, 1st ed. 1999 ISBN 978-0-02863108-0; 2nd ed. 2004, ISBN 978-1-59257245-8
- With Ted Olsen, 131 Christians Everyone Should Know, Broadman & Holman, 2000 ISBN 978-0-80549040-4
- Francis of Assisi and His World, InterVarsity Press, 2002, ISBN 978-0-83082354-3
- Jesus Mean and Wild: The Unexpected Love of an Untamable God, Baker Publishing Group, 2006, ISBN 978-080101284-6
- Beyond Smells and Bells: The Wonder and Power of Christian Liturgy, Paraclete Press, 2008, ISBN 978-1-55725521-1
- God Wins: Heaven, Hell, and Why the Good News Is Better than Love Wins, Tyndale, July, 2011. ISBN 978-141436666-1 The Christian Post described God Wins as a "response" to pastor Rob Bell's book Love Wins.
- Chaos and Grace: Discovering the Liberating Work of the Holy Spirit, Baker Publishing Group, October 2011, ISBN 978-0-80101350-8
- Karl Barth: An Introductory Biography for Evangelicals, William B. Eerdmans Publishing Company, 2017, ISBN 978-0-80286939-5
- With All The Saints. My Journey to the Catholic Church, Word on Fire, 2022, ISBN 978-1-94324399-0
