= Church of the Saviour (Washington, D.C.) =

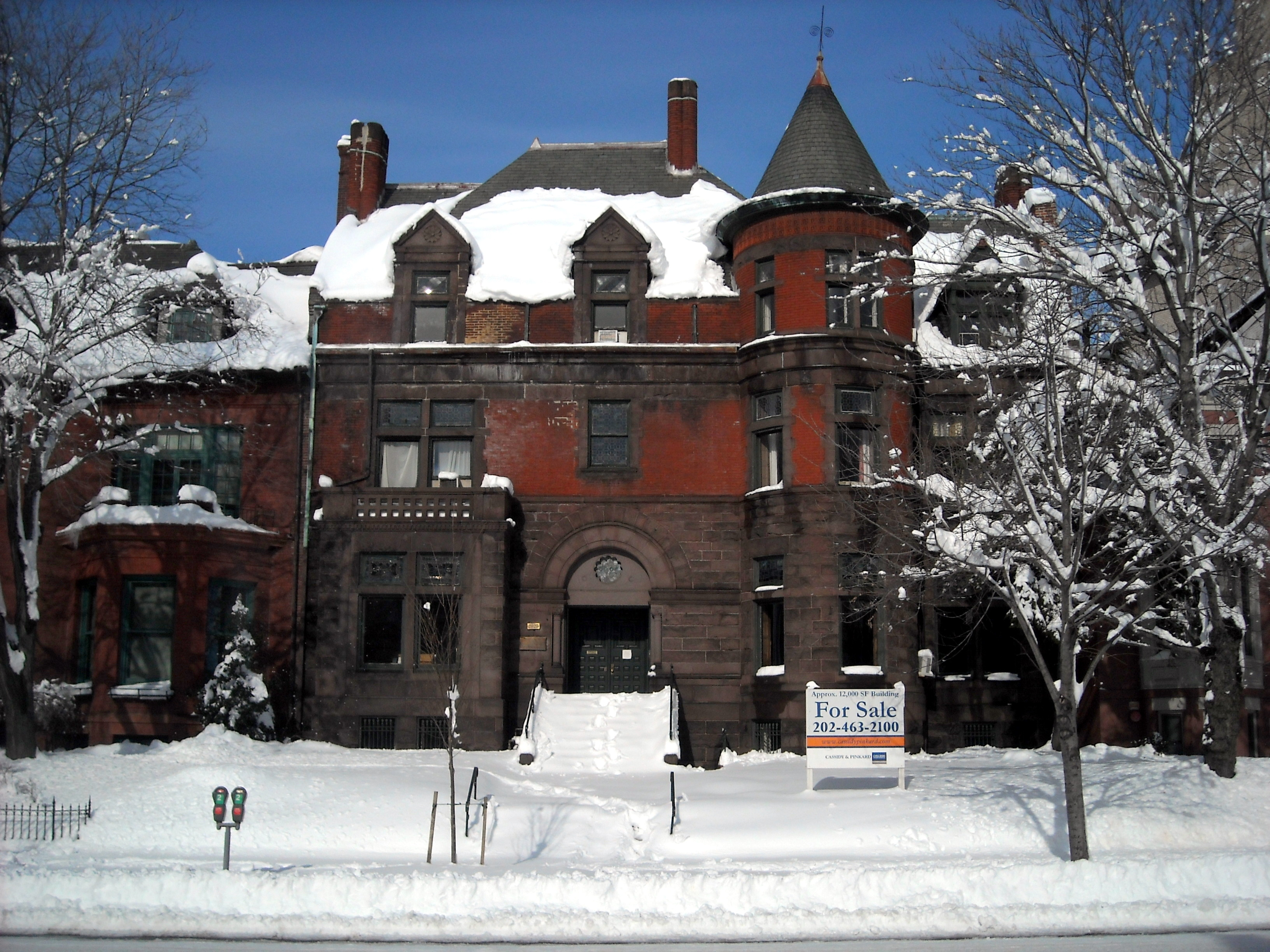
Former location of Church of the Saviour

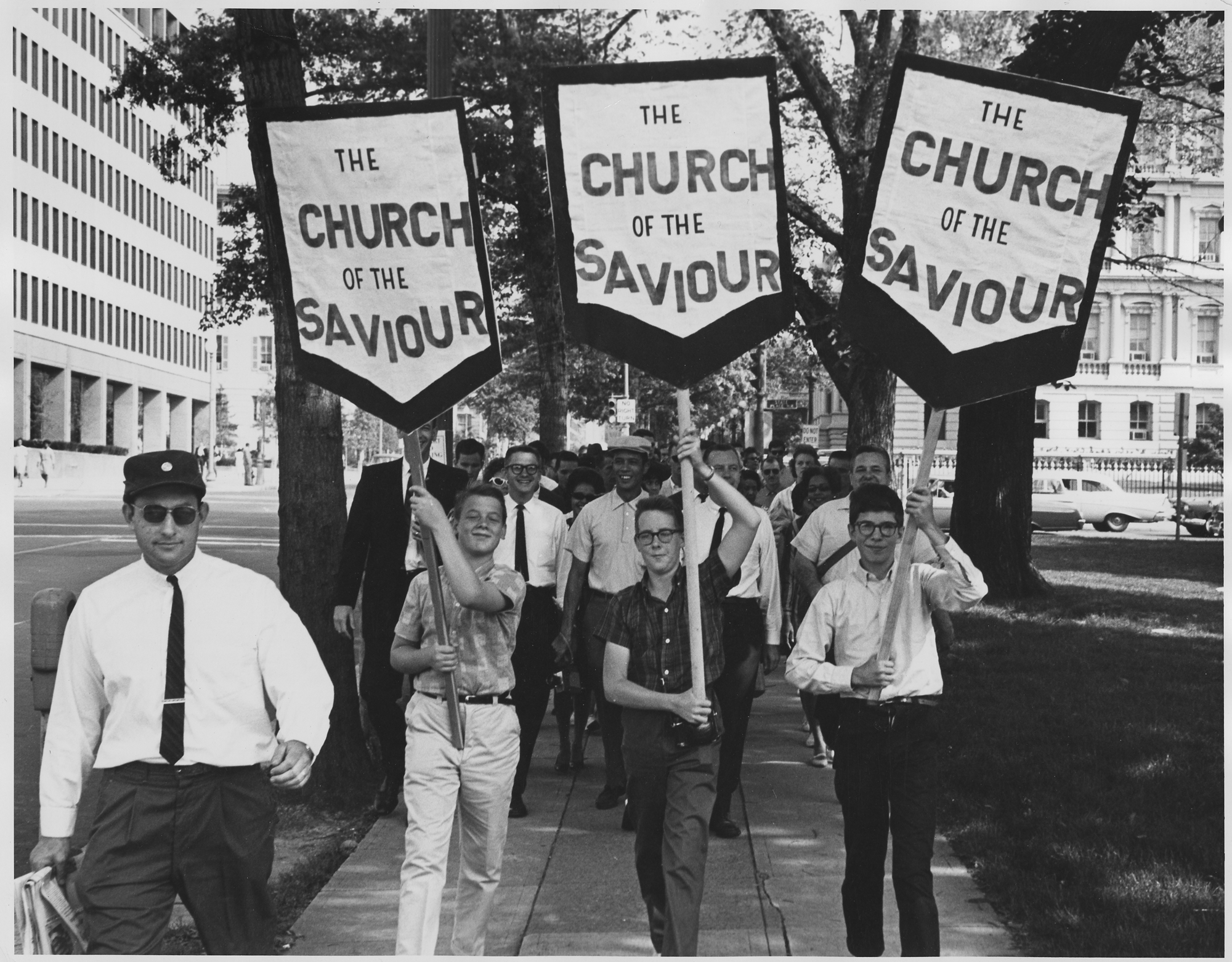
Marchers from The Church of the Savior, on the day of the March on Washington for Jobs and Freedom

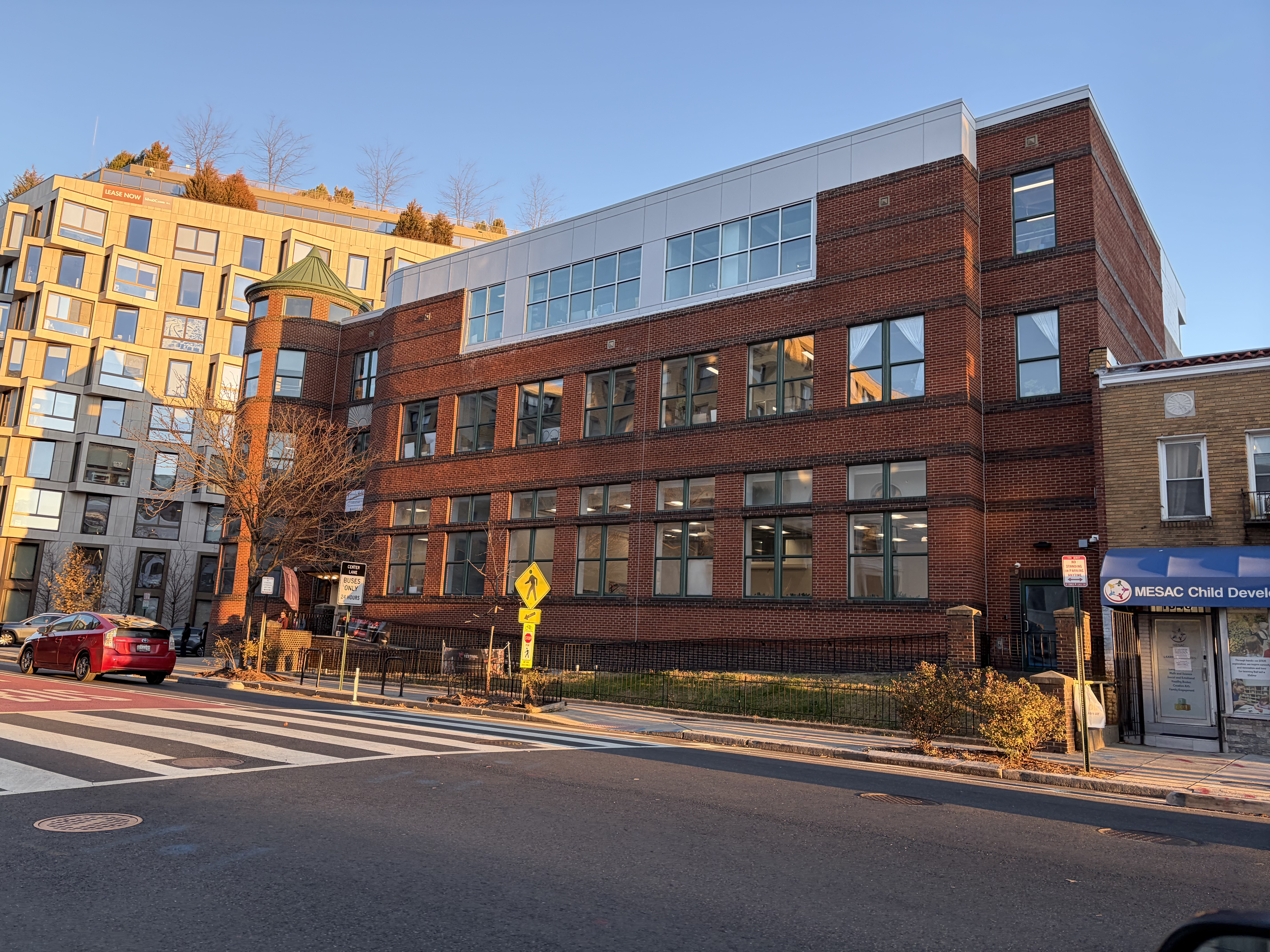
The Festival Center on Columbia Road in Adams Morgan, Washington, D.C. Built in 1989, the center is an outgrowth of the Church of the Saviour and operates as a hub for left-wing social justice nonprofits, a coworking space and event rental facility.

The Church of the Saviour in Washington, DC, is a network of nine independent, ecumenical Christian faith communities and over 40 ministries that have grown out of the original Church of the Saviour community founded in the mid-1940s.

In 1960, the Church of the Saviour founded the coffeehouse The Potter's House in the Adams Morgan neighborhood, which was the center of the Church of Saviour's ministries until the 1970s.

The current ministries and faith communities are the result of an alternative approach to “church” and church structures which is the hallmark of the Church of the Saviour. This approach and these structures were formed in an effort to improve Christian discipleship and “recover... something of the vitality and life, vigor and power of the early Christian community." In that effort the church's approach emphasizes integrity of membership, the ministry of the laity, and communal intimacy and accountability. This desire for intimacy and accountability among members of the church is what led the community to break into smaller congregations rather than try to grow larger as a single church. It has also led to the formation of small groups called “mission groups”, made up of 2 to 15 members gathered around a shared sense of vocation or God's calling. These groups became the fundamental unit of community and accountability in the church, and the various groups, each following their own sense of call, gave rise to most of the ministries associated with the church. As a structure, the mission groups have been continued in one form or another in the church's offspring faith communities.

Through the writings of longtime church member Elizabeth O'Connor (1928–1998) and others, Church of the Saviour has become influential among Christian religious groups throughout the country and has informed such contemporary movements as the missional church movement, the Emergent Church movement, and the New Monasticism movement.

== See also ==
- Academy of hope
