= Pub church =

Christian Church which meets in a public house

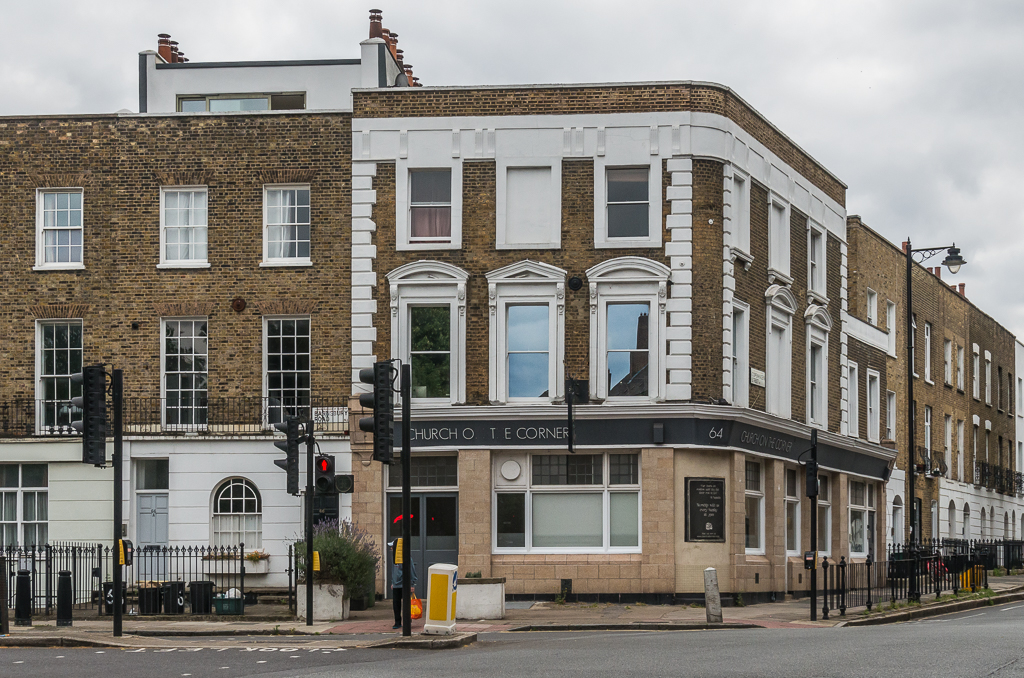
The Church on the Corner in Islington, London; the group uses a former pub building as their church

A pub church is a Christian Church which meets in a public house or similar establishment. Their purpose is to exist as an authentic Christian community, but in a way which is both provocative and accessible to un-churched people. Thornton recognises that the closure of public houses has diminished community space, and this is an attempt to restore this community asset.

As Archbishop Rowan Williams has commented:

If 'church' is what happens when people encounter the Risen Jesus and commit themselves to sustaining and deepening that encounter in their encounter with each other, there is plenty of theological room for diversity of rhythm and style, so long as we have ways of identifying the same living Christ at the heart of every expression of Christian life in common.

This can take a number of forms. Sometimes an old public house is purchased, and used as a church building, retaining the welcome and feel of a pub. Others rent a room in an existing pub, and church happens with the context of the functioning public house.

== Examples ==
In the United Kingdom examples include the Eagle's Nest Church group which met at the Maid Marian pub in Nottingham, and the Bar None group which held meetings at a pub in Cardiff. In 2009, a community of believers in Fishers, Indiana, were meeting at The Pub at Pinheads under the ministry name of Leavener.

The Church on the Corner operates from a former pub in Islington, London. The group moved into the then-derelict King Edward VII pub in 1994.

== Critique ==
This has been said to be an example of what Nicholas M Healy calls "ecclesial bricolage." The church inhabits various aspects of its culture, and attempts to use them in its mission, sometimes unaware that each aspect has both positive and negative possibilities. In this case, the advantages of mission activity may not outweigh the difficulty of demonstrating a distinct community investing in clearly different values. This is because of what might be sacrificed in order to be "relevant." Newbigin comments that the church should be both distinct from its culture and comprehensible by it. Pub church treads this fine line.

== See also ==
- Cafe church
- Cell group
- Emerging Church
- Missional Christianity
