= Intercultural theology =

Approach within Christian theology emphasizing cross-cultural dialogue

Intercultural theology is a field within Christian theology and religious studies that examines theological reflection and Christian practice as shaped through interaction among diverse cultural contexts. The term is used particularly in Christian missiological scholarship to describe approaches that emphasize dialogue, mutual exchange, and the plurality of cultural perspectives in theological development. Some scholars describe intercultural theology as an expansion or reconfiguration of missiology in response to the growth of global Christianity and increasing cultural interconnectedness.

== Definition and scope ==
Intercultural theology investigates how Christian beliefs, practices, and theological traditions are interpreted and negotiated across cultural boundaries. It draws on insights from missiology, contextual theology, and world Christianity studies. Rather than treating theology as emerging from a single cultural center, intercultural approaches typically emphasize reciprocal learning and the polycentric character of contemporary Christianity.

== Historical development ==
The emergence of intercultural theology has been linked to broader shifts in twentieth-century mission theology and ecumenical discourse. Missiologist David Bosch described a transition toward understanding mission as historically and culturally embedded rather than culturally neutral, a development often associated with later intercultural approaches. In European academic contexts, the term intercultural theology has increasingly been used since the late twentieth century to describe theological reflection shaped by global Christianity and postcolonial critiques of mission.

== Academic usage ==
Intercultural theology is studied in theological faculties and religious studies departments, particularly in German- and Dutch-speaking contexts, where it has sometimes reframed or expanded traditional missiology within academic curricula. Scholars working in intercultural mission studies use the concept to emphasize dialogical engagement and mutual transformation between cultures. The term is also reflected in the naming of academic degree programs, such as Doctor of Intercultural Studies, which frame theological and missiological research explicitly in intercultural terms.

== See also ==
- Contextual theology
- Missiology
- World Christianity
- Interculturalism
- Doctor of Intercultural Studies
