= Church renewal =

Potential revitalization of the Christian Church

Church renewal is the potential revitalization of the Christian Church in light of the perceived decline of Christianity in many Western countries. The idea of a post-Christian era has made church renewal a popular topic of study among many commentators.

There are a number of church renewal movements, such as the emerging church movement, the Missional Church Movement, the Confessing Movement, the simple church movement, New Calvinism, and New Monasticism. Dozens of renewal movements have emerged within mainline Protestant denominations in the United States.

While the church has experienced trials throughout church history, the modern church renewal movements have arisen in response to the perceived decline of the church in recent history. For example, between 1948 and 2008, the percentage of Americans who identified themselves with some form of Christianity has dropped from 91% to 77%. Among other factors, low church attendance in Western Europe and the decline of mainline Protestantism in North America often motivate this concern. Even more troubling for church leaders is that of the 59% of Americans who are not affiliated with a church congregation, six out of ten still consider themselves Christians and do not feel a need to be associated with a church.

Various philosophical, theological, sociological, and practical reasons have been given for the decline of Christianity and the waning influence of the church, and various ideas have been proposed to halt the decline. Many theologians and scholars of religion have begun to look to the Global South, where Christianity is perceived to be flourishing, for hints and suggestions concerning the renewal of the church in the Global North.

== Notable theologians dealing with church renewal ==
- Alan Hirsch
- Thomas C. Oden
- Michael Frost
- Ed Stetzer
- Brian McLaren
- William Abraham
- Harvey Cox
