= List of missiologists =

This is a list of notable missiologists.

== List ==
- Johan Herman Bavinck
- David Bosch
- Carl Braaten
- Harvie M. Conn
- Benjamin L. Corey
- Duncan B. Forrester
- Michael Frost (minister)
- Arthur Glasser
- Darrell Guder
- Roger E. Hedlund
- Paul Hiebert (missiologist)
- Alan Hirsch
- Hendrik Kraemer
- Charles H. Kraft
- Donald McGavran
- Gary V. Nelson
- Lesslie Newbigin
- Eugene Nida
- Tony Palmer (bishop)
- Lamin Sanneh
- James Augustin Brown Scherer
- Ed Stetzer
- Bengt Sundkler
- Alan Tippett
- C. Peter Wagner
- Gustav Warneck
- Andrew Walls
- Ralph D. Winter
- Thomas Schirrmacher
