= Doctor of Intercultural Studies =

Professional doctorate degree

- Acronym: DIS, DICS
- Type: Doctoral Degree
- Purpose: Advanced research and applied scholarship related to Intercultural theology, Missiology, Anthropology, Theology, Sociology, Cross-cultural studies.
- Duration: 3–6 years (varies by institution and format)
- Prerequisites: Master’s degree in a related field, professional experience related to research topic (varies by institution)

Doctor of Intercultural Studies (abbreviated as DIS, DICS, or Dr.IS) is a terminal degree in the academic discipline of intercultural theology. Typically offered by Christian seminaries and theological schools, this interdisciplinary course of study integrates insights from anthropology, missiology, sociology, cultural studies, and theology to prepare students for leadership, teaching, and research roles in cross-cultural and multicultural contexts.

== Overview ==
The Doctor of Intercultural Studies is typically offered by seminaries and other theological institutions with programs in missiology, intercultural communication, or global leadership. The degree is closely related to the Doctor of Missiology degree, with some programs organizing both degrees into a single program. Intercultural Studies is sometimes approached through the more conventional framework of a Ph.D; for example, Talbot School of Theology offers both a Ph.D in Intercultural Studies and a Doctor of Intercultural Studies, with the distinction that the DIS is specifically designed for practitioners interested in engaging in research related to their working contexts.

The Association of Theological Schools classifies the Doctor of Intercultural Studies degree as a professional doctoral degree, which they outline as requiring a minimum of 36 semester credits or equivalent units and incorporating a doctoral dissertation or other summative exercise. The degree is designed for individuals with experience in intercultural settings—such as missionaries, educators, or NGO leaders—who seek to deepen their theoretical understanding and contribute to academic or applied research in the field. Unlike some Ph.D. programs, which may be more narrowly focused on theory or theology, the DIS often emphasizes a blend of scholarly rigor and practical application. Programs may allow for specialization related to the specific professional contexts where participants work. Many institutions offer flexible formats, including modular intensives, online or hybrid models, and field-based research, allowing students to remain active in their ministries or professions during the program.

Doctor of Intercultural Studies degree programs are accredited by bodies such as the Association of Theological Schools and the Asia Theological Association.

== Institutions offering the degree ==
Institutions that offer the Doctor of Intercultural Studies (or comparable degrees) include:

- Asbury Theological Seminary
- Columbia International University
- Fuller Theological Seminary (Pasadena, California, U.S.)
- Talbot School of Theology, Biola University (La Mirada, California, U.S.)
- Grace Theological Seminary (Winona Lake, Indiana, U.S.)
- International Theological Seminary (West Covina, California, U.S.)
- Western Seminary (Portland, Oregon, U.S.)
- Seventh-day Adventist Theological Seminary, Andrews University (Berrien Springs, Michigan, U.S.)
- Adventist International Institute of Advanced Studies (Silang, Cavite, Philippines)
- Bethany International University (Singapore)
- China Evangelical Seminary (Taipei, Taiwan)

Some universities offer comparable degrees under different titles, such as Doctor of Missiology or Doctor of Global Leadership.

== See also ==
- Intercultural theology
- Intercultural studies
- Missiology
- Doctor of Missiology
- Contextual theology
- Cross-cultural communication
