= Eugen Sachsse =

German Protestant theologian

Eugen Friedrich Ferdinand Sachsse (20 August 1839 – 20 December 1917) was a German Protestant theologian born in Cologne.

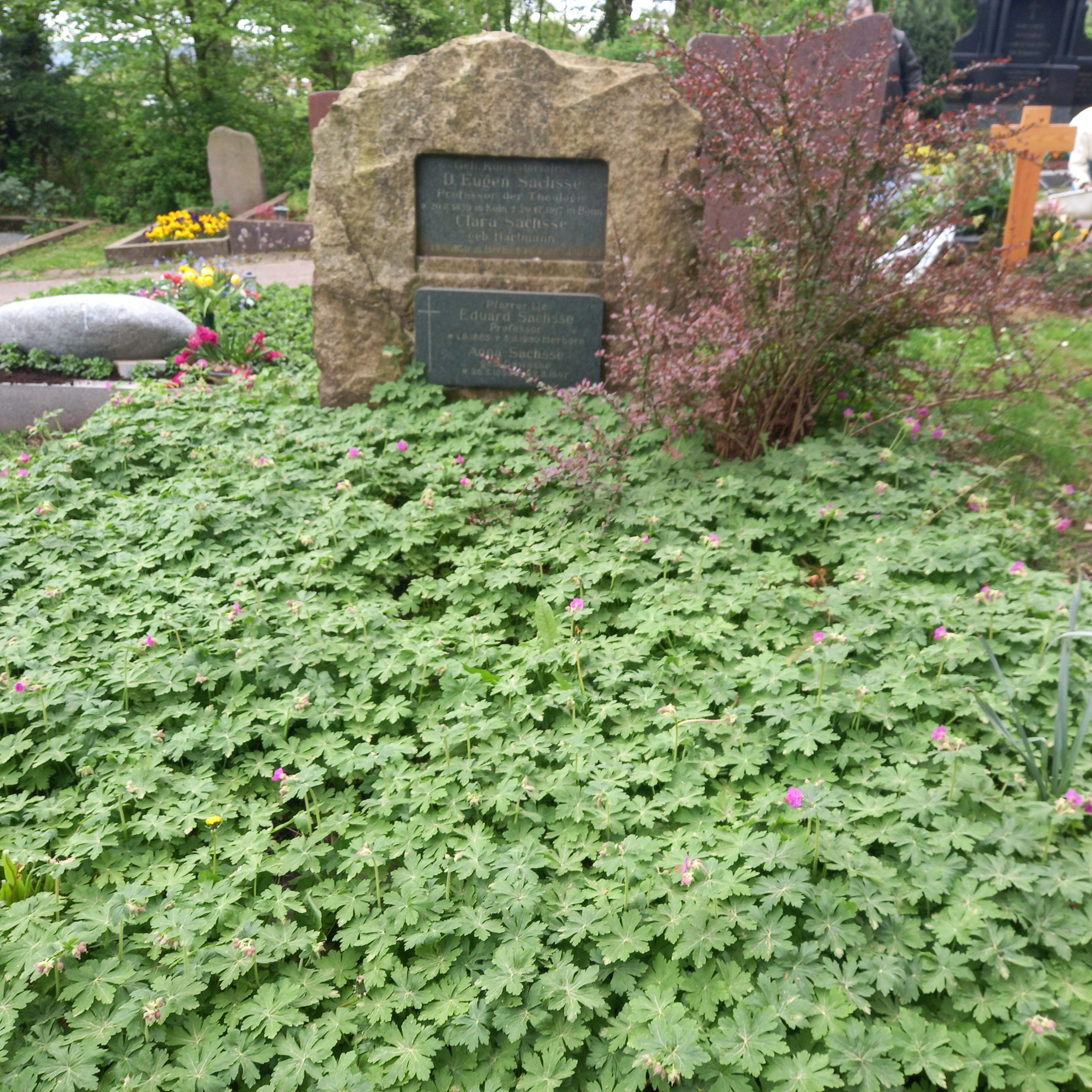
Tomb of Eugen Sachsse at Poppelsdorf cemetery, Bonn

He studied theology in Bonn and Berlin, receiving his habilitation in 1863 with a thesis on the Pietism of Philipp Jakob Spener. From 1871, he served at the rectory in Hamm, where in 1872 he became district school superintendent (Kreischulinspektor). In 1883, he was appointed director of the minister's seminary in Herborn.

From 1890 to 1913, he was a professor of practical theology to the Evangelical Theological Faculty at the University of Bonn. He was co-editor of Halte was du hast ("Hold what you have"), a magazine of pastoral theology. A few of his better known written works are:

- Ursprung und Wesen des Pietismus (Origin and essence of Pietism), 1884.
- Die Lehre von der kirchlichen Erziehung nach evangelischen Grundsätzen (Doctrine of religious education according to evangelical principles), 1897.
- Das Christentum und der moderne Geist (Christianity and the modern spirit), 1906.
- Einführung in die praktische Theologie (Guide to practical theology), 1914.

== Sources ==
- Klaus-Gunther Wesseling (1994). "Sachsse, Eugen Friedrich Ferdinand". In Bautz, Traugott (ed.). Biographisch-Bibliographisches Kirchenlexikon (BBKL) (in German). Vol. 8. Herzberg: Bautz. cols. 1158–1160. ISBN 3-88309-053-0.English translation
