= Stephen B. Bevans =

American Catholic theologian

The Reverend Stephen B. Bevans, SVD

Orders
- Ordination: September 5, 1971

Personal details
- Born: July 14, 1944 (age 82) Baltimore, Maryland, U.S.
- Denomination: Roman Catholic
- Parents: Bert Bennett and Bernadette (O'Grady) Bevans
- Occupation: Catholic priest
- Profession: Professor, theologian, missiologist, systematic theologian
- Education: Divine Word College (B.A.), 1967; Pontifical Gregorian University (S.T.B.), 1970; (S.T.L.), 1972; University of Notre Dame (M.A.), 1984; University of Notre Dame (Ph.D.), 1986

Stephen B. Bevans
- Writing career
- Subjects: Contextual Theology, Missiology, Systematic Theology
- Notable work: Models of Contextual Theology
- Notable awards: American Society of Missiology Lifetime Achievement Award

Stephen Bennett Bevans, SVD (born July 14, 1944) is an American Catholic priest, theologian, and professor emeritus at Catholic Theological Union in Chicago, Illinois. He is known for his book Models of Contextual Theology. He is a member of the Society of the Divine Word.

== Biography ==
Bevans was born on July 14, 1944, in Baltimore, Maryland, and is the son of Bert Bennett and Bernadette (O'Grady) Bevans.

After attending a Society of the Divine Word high school seminary in Riverside, California, he attended Divine Word College, graduating with his B.A. in 1967. He then received his S.T.B. and S.T.L. at the Pontifical Gregorian University in 1970 and 1972, respectively. After his priestly ordination in 1971, he spent 9 years as a missionary in the Philippines. He obtained his M.A. and Ph.D. in Theology in 1984 and 1986, respectively, at the University of Notre Dame. Upon the completion of his graduation study, he started teaching at Catholic Theological Union in Chicago, Illinois, until his retirement in 2015.

He is the past president of the American Society of Missiology and now serves on the editorial board. He is also a member of the World Council of Churches' Commission on World Mission and Evangelism.

His monograph, Models of Contextual Theology, argues that all theology is contextual, whether it is practical theology or systematic theology. On top of the two loci theologici, scripture and tradition, context, in other words, human experience, should be the third source for theological expression.

A festschrift was published in his honor, entitled Christian Mission, Contextual Theology, Prophetic Dialogue (2018).

In 2021, the American Society of Missiology gave him its Lifetime Achievement Award and in 2025, the Catholic Theological Society of America gave Bevans the John Courtney Murray Award, an annual award for a “lifetime of distinguished theological achievement.”

== Selected works ==
- Models of Contextual Theology (2002). Maryknoll, New York: Orbis. ISBN 9780883448144
- Constants in Context: A Theology of Mission for Today (2004). Maryknoll, New York: Orbis (With Roger Schroeder). ISBN 9781608330287
- An Introduction to Theology in Global Perspective (2009). Maryknoll, New York: Orbis. ISBN 9781570758522.
- Mission and Culture: The Louis J. Luzbetak Lectures (2012). Maryknoll, New York: Orbis. ISBN 9781570759659
- Essays in Contextual Theology (2018). Leiden: Brill. ISBN 9789004363083

== See also ==
- A Video by Divine Word Theologate Chicago
