= Ian Mobsby =

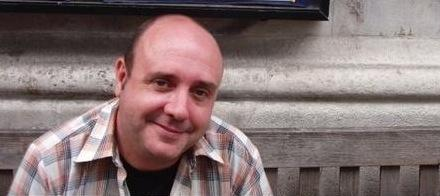
- Born: Ian Jonathan Mobsby; 14 January 1968; Southampton, Hampshire, U.K.
- Occupations: Missioner, Author, lecturer
- Years active: 2003–Current
- Known for: Anglican Missioner, Author

Ian Mobsby is a writer, speaker and missioner. He is currently the Diocesan Community Missioner for the Anglican Diocese of Niagara in the Anglican Church of Canada, and the Canon for Mission Theology also for the Diocese of Niagara. He is the lead for formation with the Society of the Holy Trinity. He was formally the Assistant Dean for Fresh Expressions and Pioneer Ministry in the Diocese of Southwark and the former Rector of Christchurch Blackfriars in London. Mobsby is the former Priest in Charge of the Guild Church of St Mary Aldermary in the City of London and the former missioner to the Moot Community. Mobsby has a background in the Emerging Church and in particular New Monasticism and as an associate missioner of the Fresh expression Initiative. He has completed a PhD, an ethnographic and theological research exploring the spiritual but not religious as a social grouping through the Archbishop's Examination in Theology.

== Biography ==
=== Early life and education ===
Mobsby was born in the heady days of the late 1960s, with a family inheritance of atheism, the arts and socialism on his mother's side and science, the arts and banking on his father's side. At an early age he took to music, which became a key motif to his life, particularly with the classical guitar and violin. He also had a love of nature and has described in his writing how this opened up the experience of spirituality in nature. He trained for a BHSc (Hons) in occupational therapy at York St John University which was formally part of the University of Leeds at the time.

It was while studying in York that Mobsby became a committed Christian, largely through an alternative worship project then called Warehouse and now called Visions.

=== Vocation and ministry ===
Mobsby completed an MA in Pastoral Theology validated by Anglia Ruskin University and taught through the Cambridge University's Cambridge Theological Federation part-time whilst still working split between Occupational Therapy and working as a lay pioneer. At the end of training, he was released from the Southwark diocese to be involved in forming a new missional and fresh expression of church at the Church of England church called St Matthew's Westminster in the Diocese of London. He was ordained by the Bishop of London to serve a training title with St Matthew's, Westminster and the Moot Community. In the second year of his curacy and work with Moot, Mobsby met with the new Archbishop's Missioner the then Revd Steven Croft now Bp of Oxford, where he was formally invited to become an Associate Missioner of the new Fresh Expressions initiative. At the same time Mobsby completed his MA research dissertation, Emerging and Fresh Expressions of Church, how are they authentically Church and Anglican?.

Mobsby has founded several new monastic communities that include the Wellspring Community Peckham and the Moot Community, drawing heavily on a contemplative and sacramental basis to the Christian faith which seeks to promote a focus on following Jesus and in particular live out the marks of mission in how the community lives. Both the Wellspring Community and Moot Community have become leading new monastic communities in the UK. In 2011 Mobsby was co-opted onto the Church of England's Advisory Council for the relations between Diocesan Bishops and Religious Communities to help this Anglican body discern a way forward to recognise New Monastic Communities as Acknowledged Religious Communities.

After a lengthy period of discernment Mobsby was the first elected Guardian of the newly constituted Society of the Holy Trinity, a new Society for the promotion of Anglican & Episcopal missional new monastic communities in the UK and beyond. He continues as the current Lead for formation in the International leading chapter of the society.

More recently, drawing on his PhD research Mobsby has been promoting the importance of engaging with the reality of a post-secular cultural reality for the UK and Canada, and particularly focused on how local churches and missions respond to the growing number of new social groupings including the Spiritual But Not Religious.

=== Theology ===
Mobsby has written about the Holy Trinity as the ultimate source of his theology and missiology. Phyllis Tickle stated:

Mobsby is one of the most widely recognized Leaders in Emergence both internationally and in the UK ..., he shines as an practical theologian .. and profoundly trinitarian, who does a superb job of explicating exactly what that means and what that translates to on the ground. (Emergence Christianity: What It Is, Where It Is Going, and Why It Matters, Phyllis Tickle, Sept 2012, Baker Books)

Mobsby makes connections between God as an event of grace, and a happening to inform his understanding of God and God's salvific purposes for all people, as God seeks to restore all things back into right relationship with the divine.

The relationship with the Divine therefore becomes fluid and dynamic, a form of transcendent event and encounter, knowing God through experience rather than knowing God through propositional facts. This is a profound form of missionary encounter. (Emerging and Fresh Expressions of Church, Ian Mobsby, 2007, Moot Community Publishing)

=== Writing ===
Mobsby has written and co-authored a number of books, and chapters in other edited books

Own research and writing

- The Seeking Heart. A Contemplative Approach to Mission and Pioneering, Norwich: SCM Press: 2025. ISBN 9780334065852
- Emerging and Fresh Expressions of Church. How are they Church and Anglican?, London: Moot Community Publishing, 2006. ISBN 9780955980008
- God Unknown. The Trinity in Contemporary Spirituality and Mission, Norwich: Canterbury Press: 2012. ISBN 9781848251700
- with Kennedy Aaron, The Rhythm of Life, Virtues, Postures and Practices: A Proposal for the Moot Community, (London: Moot Community Publishing, 2008).

Ancient Faith Future Mission series

- Croft Steven, Mobsby Ian "Ancient Faith Future Mission: Fresh Expressions in the Sacramental Traditions", Norwich: Canterbury Press, 2008, New York: Church House Publishing, 2009.
- Cray Graham, Mobsby Ian "Ancient Faith Future Mission: New Monasticism as Fresh Expressions of Church", Norwich: Canterbury Press, 2010.
- Cray Graham, Mobsby Ian, Kennedy Aaron "Ancient Faith Future Mission: Fresh Expressions and the Kingdom of God", Norwich: Canterbury Press, 2012.
- Mobsby Ian, Potter Phil "Ancient Faith Future Mission: Doorways to the Sacred", Norwich: Canterbury Press, 2017.

Chapters in other books

- "New Monastic Community in a Time of Environmental Crisis" in Bolger K Ryan "The Gospel after Christendom", (Baker Academic, 2012).
- "Seeking in the City?" in Walker Andrew Kennedy Aaron Discovering the Spirit in the City, (London: Continuum, 2010). ISBN 9781441110824
- "Oversight in New Monastic Communities" in Standing Roger Goodliff Paul, Aldred Joe, (Norwich: SCM Press, 2020).
