= Emerging church =

Christian movement

The emerging church is a Christian movement of the late 20th and early 21st century. Emerging churches can be found around the globe, predominantly in North America, Western Europe, Australia, New Zealand, and Africa. Members come from a number of Christian traditions. Some attend local independent churches or house churches while others worship in traditional Christian denominations. The emerging church favors the use of simple story and narrative. Members of the movement often place a high value on good works or social activism, including missional living. Proponents of the movement believe it transcends labels such as "conservative" and "liberal"; it is sometimes called a "conversation" to emphasize its developing and decentralized nature, its range of standpoints, and commitment to dialogue. Participants seek to live their faith in what they believe to be a "postmodern" society. Disillusionment with the organized and institutional church has led participants to support the deconstruction of modern Christian worship and evangelism, and the nature of modern Christian community.

== Definitions and terminology ==
Participants in the movement may be Protestant, post-Protestant, Catholic, or evangelical post-evangelical, liberal Christian, post-liberal, conservative, and post-conservative, anabaptist, adventist, reformed, charismatic, neocharismatic, and post-charismatic. Proponents, however, believe the movement transcends such "modernist" labels of "conservative" and "liberal," calling the movement a "conversation" to emphasize its developing and decentralized nature, its vast range of standpoints, and its commitment to dialogue. Participants seek to live their faith in what they believe to be a "postmodern" society. What those involved in the conversation mostly agree on is their disillusionment with the organized and institutional church and their support for the deconstruction of modern Christian worship, modern evangelism, and the nature of modern Christian community.

Some have noted a difference between the terms emerging and Emergent. While emerging is a wider, informal, church-based, global movement, Emergent is sometimes associated specifically with the Emergent Village, co-founded by Brian McLaren, and has also been called the "Emergent stream".

Key themes of the emerging church are couched in the language of reform, Christian praxis-oriented lifestyles, post-evangelical thought, and incorporation or acknowledgment of Christian political and postmodern Christian elements. Many of the movement's participants use terminology that originates from postmodern literary theory, social network theory, narrative theology, and other related fields.

Stuart Murray states:

Emerging churches are so disparate there are exceptions to any generalisations. Most are too new and too fluid to clarify, let alone assess their significance. There is no consensus yet about what language to use: 'new ways of being church'; 'emerging church'; 'fresh expressions of church'; 'future church'; 'church next'; or 'the coming church'. The terminology used here contrasts 'inherited' and 'emerging' churches.

— Murray (2004), p. 73

Ian Mobsby observes:

The use of the phrase 'emerging church' appears to have been used by Larson & Osborne in 1970 in the context of reframing the meaning 'church' in the latter part of the twentieth century. This book, contains a short vision of the 'emerging church' which has a profoundly contemporary feel in the early twenty-first century ... Larson & Osborne note the following themes: Rediscovering contextual and experimental mission in the western church. Forms of church that are not restrained by institutional expectations. Open to change and God wanting to do a new thing. Use of the key word ..."and". Whereas the heady polarities of our day seek to divide us into an either-or camp, the mark of the emerging Church will be its emphasis on both-and. For generations we have divided ourselves into camps: Protestants and Catholics, high church and low, clergy and laity, social activists and personal piety, liberals and conservatives, sacred and secular, instructional and underground. It will bring together the most helpful of the old and best of the new, blending the dynamic of a personal Gospel with the compassion of social concern. It will find its ministry being expressed by a whole people, wherein the distinction between clergy and laity will be that of function, not of status or hierarchical division. In the emerging Church, due emphasis will be placed on both theological rootage and contemporary experience, on celebration in worship and involvement in social concerns, on faith and feeling, reason and prayer, conversion and continuity, the personal and the conceptual.

— Mobsby (2007), pp. 20–21

=== Similar labels ===
Although some emergent thinkers such as Brian McLaren and other Christian scholars such as D. A. Carson use emerging and emergent as synonyms, a large number of participants in the emerging church movement maintain a distinction between them. The term emergent church was coined in 1981 by Catholic political theologian, Johann Baptist Metz for use in a different context. Emergent is sometimes more closely associated with Emergent Village. Those participants in the movement who assert this distinction believe "emergents" and "emergent village" to be a part of the emerging church movement but prefer to use the term emerging church to refer to the movement as a whole while using the term emergent in a more limited way, referring to Brian McLaren and Emergent Village.

Many of those within the emerging church movement who do not closely identify with emergent village tend to avoid that organization's interest in radical theological reformulation and focus more on new ways of "doing church" and expressing their spirituality. Mark Driscoll and Scot McKnight have now voiced concerns over Brian McLaren and the "emergent thread." Other evangelical leaders such as Shane Claiborne have also come to distance himself from the emerging church movement, its labels and the "emergent brand".

Some observers consider the "emergent stream" to be one major part within the larger emerging church movement. This may be attributed to the stronger voice of the 'emergent' stream found in the US which contrasts the more subtle and diverse development of the movement in the UK, Australia and New Zealand over a longer period of time. In the US, some Roman Catholics have also begun to describe themselves as being part of the emergent conversation. As a result of the above factors, the use of correct vocabulary to describe a given participant in this movement can occasionally be awkward, confusing, or controversial. Key voices in the movement have been identified with Emergent Village, thus the rise of the nomenclature emergent to describe participants in the movement.

Marcus Borg defines the term "emerging paradigm" in his 2003 book The Heart of Christianity. He writes

The emerging paradigm has been visible for well over a hundred years. In the last twenty to thirty years, it has become a major grassroots movement among both laity and clergy in "mainline" or "old mainline" Protestant denominations.

Borg provides a compact summary of this "emerging paradigm" as:

...a way of seeing the Bible (and the Christian tradition as a whole) as historical, metaphorical, and sacramental, [and] a way of seeing the Christian life as relational and transformational.

== History ==
Although the history is little known in the US, there was a strong current of emerging churches in the UK and elsewhere that preceded the US Emergent organization. This began with Mike Riddell and Mark Pierson in New Zealand from 1989, and with a number of practitioners in the UK including Jonny Baker, Ian Mobsby, Kevin, Ana and Brian Draper, and Sue Wallace amongst others, from around 1992. The influence of the Nine O'Clock Service has is generally unacknowledged—perhaps owing to the abuse by its leader which led to the group's demise—yet much that was practised there was influential on early proponents of alternative worship. The US organization emerged in the late 1990s.

What is common to the identity of many of these emerging church projects that began in Australia, New Zealand and the United Kingdom, is that they developed with very little central planning on behalf of the established denominations. They occurred as the initiative of particular groups wanting to start new contextual church experiments, and are therefore very 'bottom up'. Murray says that these churches began in a spontaneous way, with informal relationships formed between otherwise independent groups and that many became churches as a development from their initial more modest beginnings.

== Values and characteristics ==
=== Trinitarian-based values ===
Gibbs and Bolger interviewed a number of people involved in leading emerging churches and from this research have identified some core values in the emerging church, including desires to imitate the life of Jesus; transform secular society; emphasise communal living; welcome outsiders; be generous and creative; and lead without control. Ian Mobsby suggests Trinitarian ecclesiology is the basis of these shared international values.

Mobsby also suggests that the emerging church is centred on a combination of models of church and of contextual theology that draw on this Trinitarian base: the Mystical Communion and Sacramental models of church, and the Synthetic and Transcendent models of contextual theology.

According to Mobsby, the emerging church has reacted to the missional needs of postmodern culture and re-acquired a Trinitarian basis to its understanding of church as worship, mission and community. He argues this movement is over and against some forms of conservative evangelicalism and other reformed ecclesiologies since the enlightenment that have neglected the Trinity, which has caused problems with certainty, judgementalism and fundamentalism and the increasing gap between the church and contemporary culture.

=== Post-Christendom mission and evangelism ===
According to Stuart Murray, Christendom is the creation and maintenance of a Christian nation by ensuring a close relationship of power between the Christian church and its host culture. Today, churches may still attempt to use this power in mission and evangelism. The emerging church considers this to be unhelpful. Murray summarizes Christendom values as: a commitment to hierarchy and the status quo; the loss of lay involvement; institutional values rather than community focus; church at the centre of society rather than the margins; the use of political power to bring in the Kingdom; religious compulsion; punitive rather than restorative justice; marginalisation of women, the poor, and dissident movements; inattentiveness to the criticisms of those outraged by the historic association of Christianity with patriarchy, warfare, injustice and patronage; partiality for respectability and top-down mission; attractional evangelism; assuming the Christian story is known; and a preoccupation with the rich and powerful.

The emerging church seeks a post-Christendom approach to being church and mission through: renouncing imperialistic approaches to language and cultural imposition; making 'truth claims' with humility and respect; overcoming the public/private dichotomy; moving church from the center to the margins; moving from a place of privilege in society to one voice amongst many; a transition from control to witness, maintenance to mission and institution to movement.

While some Evangelicals emphasize eternal salvation, many in the emerging church emphasize the here and now. In the face of criticism, some in the emerging church respond that it is important to attempt a "both and" approach to redemptive and incarnational theologies. Some Evangelicals and Fundamentalists are perceived as "overly redemptive" and therefore in danger of condemning people by communicating the gospel in aggressive and angry ways. A more loving and affirming approach is proposed in the context of post-modernity where distrust may occur in response to power claims. It is suggested that this can form the basis of a constructive engagement with 21st-century post-industrial western cultures. According to Ian Mobsby, the suggestion that the emerging church is mainly focused on deconstruction and the rejection of current forms of church should itself be rejected.

=== Postmodernism and hermeneutics ===
The emerging church is a response to the perceived influence of modernism in Western Christianity. As some sociologists commented on a cultural shift that they believed to correspond to postmodern ways of perceiving reality in the late 20th century, some Christians began to advocate changes within the church in response. These Christians saw the contemporary church as being culturally bound to modernism. They changed their practices to relate to the new cultural situation. Emerging Christians began to challenge the modern church on issues such as: institutional structures, systematic theology, propositional teaching methods, a perceived preoccupation with buildings, an attractional understanding of mission, professional clergy, and a perceived preoccupation with the political process and unhelpful jargon ("Christianese").

As a result, some in the emerging church believe it is necessary to deconstruct modern Christian dogma. One way this happens is by engaging in dialogue, rather than proclaiming a predigested message, believing that this leads people to Jesus through the Holy Spirit on their own terms. Many in the movement embrace the missiology that drives the movement in an effort to be like Christ and make disciples by being a good example. The emerging church movement contains a great diversity in beliefs and practices, although some have adopted a preoccupation with sacred rituals, good works, and political and social activism. Much of the Emerging Church movement has also adopted the approach to evangelism which stressed peer-to-peer dialogue rather than dogmatic proclamation and proselytizing.

A plurality of Scriptural interpretations is acknowledged in the emerging church movement. Participants in the movement exhibit a particular concern for the effect of the modern reader's cultural context on the act of interpretation echoing the ideas of postmodern thinkers such as Jacques Derrida and Stanley Fish. Therefore a narrative approach to Scripture, and history are emphasized in some emerging churches over exegetical and dogmatic approaches (such as that found in systematic theology and systematic exegesis), which are often viewed as reductionist. Others embrace a multiplicity of approaches.

=== Generous orthodoxy ===
Some emerging church leaders see interfaith dialogue a means to share their narratives as they learn from the narratives of others. Some Emerging Church Christians believe there are radically diverse perspectives within Christianity that are valuable for humanity to progress toward truth and a better resulting relationship with God, and that these different perspectives deserve Christian charity rather than condemnation.

=== Centered set ===
The movement appropriates set theory as a means of understanding a basic change in the way the Christian church thinks about itself as a group. Set theory is a concept in mathematics that allows an understanding of what numbers belong to a group, or set. A bounded set would describe a group with clear "in" and "out" definitions of membership. The Christian church has largely organized itself as a bounded set, those who share the same beliefs and values are in the set and those who disagree are outside.

The centered set does not limit membership to pre-conceived boundaries. Instead, a centered set is conditioned on a centered point. Membership is contingent on those who are moving toward that point. Elements moving toward a particular point are part of the set, but elements moving away from that point are not. As a centered-set Christian membership would be dependent on moving toward the central point of Jesus. A Christian is then defined by their focus and movement toward Christ rather than a limited set of shared beliefs and values.

John Wimber utilized the centered-set understanding of membership in his Vineyard Churches. The centered set theory of Christian churches came largely from missional anthropologist Paul Hiebert. The centered-set understanding of membership allows for a clear vision of the focal point, the ability to move toward that point without being tied down to smaller diversions, a sense of total egalitarianism with respect for differing opinions, and an authority moved from individual members to the existing center.

=== Authenticity and conversation ===
The movement favors the sharing of experiences via testimonies, prayer, group recitation, sharing meals and other communal practices, which they believe are more personal and sincere than propositional presentations of the Gospel. Teachers in the emerging church tend to view the Bible and its stories through a lens which they believe finds significance and meaning for their community's social and personal stories rather than for the purpose of finding cross-cultural, propositional absolutes regarding salvation and conduct.

The emerging church claims they are creating a safe environment for those with opinions ordinarily rejected within modern conservative evangelicalism and fundamentalism. Non-critical, interfaith dialog is preferred over dogmatically-driven evangelism in the movement. Story and narrative replaces the dogmatic:

The relationship between words and images has changed in contemporary culture. In a post-foundational world, it is the power of the image that takes us to the text. The bible is no longer a principal source of morality, functioning as a rulebook. The gradualism of postmodernity has transformed the text into a guide, a source of spirituality, in which the power of the story as a moral reference point has superseded the didactic. Thus the meaning of the Good Samaritan is more important than the Ten Commandments - even assuming that the latter could be remembered in any detail by anyone. Into this milieu the image speaks with power.

— Percy (2002), p. 165

Those in the movement do not engage in aggressive apologetics or confrontational evangelism in the traditional sense, preferring to encourage the freedom to discover truth through conversation and relationships with the Christian community.

=== Missional living ===
Participants in this movement assert that the incarnation of Christ informs their theology. They believe that as God entered the world in human form, adherents enter (individually and communally) into the context around them and aim to transform that culture through local involvement. This holistic involvement may take many forms, including social activism, hospitality and acts of kindness. This beneficent involvement in culture is part of what is called missional living. Missional living leads to a focus on temporal and social issues, in contrast with a perceived evangelical overemphasis on salvation.

Drawing on research and models of contextual theology, Mobsby asserts that the emerging church is using different models of contextual theology than conservative evangelicals, who tend to use a "translation" model of contextual theology (which has been criticized for being colonialist and condescending toward other cultures); the emerging church tends to use a "synthetic" or "transcendent" model of contextual theology. The emerging church has charged many conservative evangelical churches with withdrawal from involvement in contextual mission and seeking the contextualization of the gospel.

Christian communities must learn to deal with the problems and possibilities posed by life in the "outside" world. Of greater importance, any attempt on the part of the church to withdraw from the world would be in effect a denial of its mission.

— Harvey (1999), p. 14

Many emerging churches have put a strong emphasis on contextualization and, therefore, contextual theology. Contextual theology has been defined as "A way of doing theology in which one takes into account: the spirit and message of the gospel; the tradition of the Christian people; the culture in which one is theologising; and social change in that culture." Emerging churches, drawing on this synthetic (or transcendent) model of contextual theology, seek to have a high view towards the Bible, the Christian people, culture, humanity and justice. It is this "both ... and" approach that distinguishes contextual theology.

Emerging communities participate in social action, community involvement, global justice and sacrificial hospitality in an effort to know and share God's grace. At a conference entitled "The Emerging Church Forum" in 2006, John Franke said: "The Church of Jesus Christ is not the goal of the Gospel, just the instrument of the extension of God's mission", and: "The Church has been slow to recognize that missions isn't [sic] a program the Church administers, it is the very core of the Church's reason for being." This focus on missional living and practicing radical hospitality has led many emerging churches to deepen what they are doing by developing a rhythm of life, and a vision of missional loving engagement with the world.

A mixture of emerging Churches, Fresh Expressions of Church and mission initiatives arising out of the charismatic traditions, have begun describing themselves as new monastic communities. They again draw on a combination of the Mystical Communion Model and Sacramental Models, with a core concern to engage with the question of how we should live. The most successful of these have experimented with a combination of churches centred on place and network, with intentional communities, cafes and centres to practice hospitality. Many also have a rhythm, or rule of life to express what it means to be Christian in a postmodern context.

— Mobsby (2009), pp. 30–31

=== Communitarian or egalitarian ecclesiology ===
Proponents of the movement communicate and interact through fluid and open networks because the movement is decentralized with little institutional coordination. Because of the participation values named earlier, being community through participation affects the governance of most emerging churches. Participants avoid power relationships, attempting to gather in ways specific to their local context. In this way some in the movement share with the house church movements a willingness to challenge traditional church structures/organizations though they also respect the different expressions of traditional Christian denominations.

International research suggests that some emerging churches are utilizing a Trinitarian basis to being church through what Avery Dulles calls 'The Mystical Communion Model of Church'.

- Not an institution but a sorority.
- Church as interpersonal community.
- Church as a sisterhood of individual congregations (unified bride of Christ), and as a fellowship of people in family with God and with one another (brothers and sisters) in Christ.
- Connects strongly with the mystical 'body of Christ' as a communion of the spiritual life of faith, hope and charity.
- Resonates with Aquinas' notion of the Church as the principle of unity that dwells in Christ and in us, binding us together and in him.
- All the external means of grace, (sacraments, scripture, laws etc.) are secondary and subordinate; their role is simply to dispose people for an interior union with God effected by grace.

Dulles sees the strength in this approach being acceptable to both Protestant and Catholic:

In stressing the continual mercy of God and the continual need of the Church for repentance, the model picks up Protestant theology ... [and] in Roman Catholicism ... when it speaks of the church as both holy and sinful, as needing repentance and reform ...

— Dulles (1991), p. 46

The biblical notion of Koinonia, ... that God has fashioned for himself a people by freely communicating his Spirit and his gifts ... this is congenial to most Protestants and Orthodox ... [and] has an excellent foundation in the Catholic tradition.

— Dulles (1991), pp. 50–51

=== Creative and rediscovered spirituality ===
This can involve everything from expressive, neocharismatic style of worship and the use of contemporary music and films to more ancient liturgical customs and eclectic expressions of spirituality, with the goal of making the church gathering reflect the local community's tastes.

Emerging church practitioners are happy to take elements of worship from a wide variety of historic traditions, including traditions of the Catholic, Anglican and Eastern Orthodox Churches, and Celtic Christianity. From these and other religious traditions emerging church groups take, adapt and blend various historic church practices including liturgy, prayer beads, icons, spiritual direction, the labyrinth, and lectio divina. The emerging church is also sometimes called the "Ancient-Future" church.

One of the key social drives in Western post-industrialised countries, is the rise in new-"old" forms of mysticism. This rise in spirituality appears to be driven by the effects of consumerism, globalisation and advances in information technology. Therefore, the emerging church is operating in a new context of postmodern spirituality, as a new form of mysticism. This capitalizes on the social shift in starting assumptions from the situation that most are regarded as materialist/atheist (the modern position), to the fact that many people now believe in and are searching for something more spiritual (postmodern view). This has been characterised as a major shift from religion to spirituality.

In the new world of 'spiritual tourism', the Emerging Church Movement seeks to assist people to shift from being spiritual tourists to Christian pilgrims. Many are drawing on ancient Christian resources recontextualised into the contemporary such as contemplation and contemplative forms of prayer, symbolic multi-sensory worship, story telling and many others. This has required a change in focus as the majority of unchurched and dechurched people are seeking 'something that works' rather than something that is 'true'.

=== Morality and justice ===
Drawing on a more 'missional morality' that again turns to the synoptic gospels of Christ, many emerging-church groups draw on an understanding of God seeking to restore all things back into restored relationship. This emphasises God's graceful love approach to discipleship, in following Christ who identified with the socially excluded and ill, in opposition to the Pharisees and Sadducees and their purity rules.

Under this movement, traditional Christians' emphasis on either individual salvation, end-times theology or the prosperity gospel have been challenged. Many people in the movement express concern for what they consider to be the practical manifestation of God's kingdom on earth, by which they mean social justice. This concern manifests itself in a variety of ways depending on the local community and in ways they believe transcend "modernist" labels of "conservative" and "liberal." This concern for justice is expressed in such things as feeding the poor, visiting the sick and prisoners, stopping contemporary slavery, critiquing systemic and coercive power structures with "postcolonial hermeneutics," and working for environmental causes.

== See also ==
- Cafe church – Christian church model
- Contemplative prayer – Christian mystical practices
- Cultural appropriation – Adoption of culture and cultural identity perceived as inappropriate
- Ecumenism – Cooperation between Christian denominations
- Inculturation – Adaptation of Christianity to cultures
- Missio dei – theological term, the 'mission of God'
- Models of Contextual Theology – About the book by Stephen B. Bevans
- Progressive Christianity – Postmodern theological approach
