= Cathy Ross (missiologist) =

Missiologist

- Born: 1961 (age 64–65); Auckland, New Zealand
- Occupations: academic, missiologist

Cathy Ross (born 1961) is a New Zealand-born academic and scholar of missiology. She leads the Pioneer Mission Leadership Training centre of the Church Mission Society, in Oxford, England. She is also canon theologian at Leicester Cathedral. She is the author of Women with a Mission: Rediscovering Missionary Wives in Early New Zealand.

== Biography ==
Born in New Zealand, Ross graduated from the University of Auckland in 1983. She worked for a time as a teacher of French and German. In 1991, she went to the Democratic Republic of the Congo (then known as Zaire), as a mission partner with the New Zealand Church Mission Society. She also served in Uganda and Rwanda.

In the late 1990s, she studied at the Melbourne College of Divinity, where she completed a Bachelor of Divinity degree in 1998. She earned a Ph.D. from the University of Auckland in 2004. She taught at the Bible College of New Zealand, now Laidlaw College.

Ross moved to England to work with the Church Mission Society in 2005. She was the head for CMS's mission exchange and the scholarship program. She also held an appointment as Tutor of Contextual Theology at Ripon College Cuddesdon.

In August 2008, Ross became the general secretary of the International Association of Mission Studies. She led the organisation for eight years, stepping down in 2016.

She was installed as canon theologian at Leicester Cathedral in 2018. In May 2019, Ross was selected to lead Church Mission Society's Pioneer Mission Leadership Training programme in Oxford.

== Works ==
Ross has written on pioneer women's mission work. She authored a book examining the lives of four women who engaged in mission with their husbands in New Zealand in the 1800s. The book, entitled Women with a Mission: Rediscovering Missionary Wives in Early New Zealand, was published in 2006. The women featured in the book are Charlotte Brown, Elizabeth Colenso, Kate Hadfield, and Anne Wilson.

In 2008, Ross co-edited, with Andrew Walls, a collection of essays on missiology, entitled Mission in the Twenty-First Century: Exploring the Five Marks of Global Mission.

She also edited a collection of essays by Anglicans involved in mission who had attended the centenary celebration of the 1910 World Missionary Conference, held in Edinburgh, Scotland, in June 2010. The publication was entitled Life-Widening Mission: Global Anglican Perspectives. The book was published as part of a series by Regnum Press, about the Edinburgh 2010 gathering. Rowan Williams, the Archbishop of Canterbury, wrote the foreword to the collection. In the preface, Ross noted that her mother died in New Zealand, while she was attending a workshop for the project in Toronto, in August 2011.

Ross has collaborated on several books with Jonny Baker, the director of mission education at Church Mission Society. They co-edited The Pioneer Gift, published in 2014, and Pioneering Spirituality, published in 2015.

In 2015, Ross co-edited, with Steven Bevans from Catholic Theological Union in Chicago, the book Mission on the Road to Emmaus: Constants, Context and Prophetic Dialogue. In 2018, Ross co-edited Missional Conversations: A Dialogue between Theory and Praxis in World Mission, with Colin Smith.

In 2020, Ross and Baker published Imagining Mission with John V. Taylor, about the missiology of Taylor, who was general secretary of the Church Mission Society and the former Bishop of Winchester.

== See also ==
- Church Mission Society
- International Association for Mission Studies
