= International Association for Mission Studies =

Christian organization

The International Association for Mission Studies (IAMS) is an international, inter-confessional, and interdisciplinary professional society for the scholarly study of the Christian mission and its impact in the world and the related field of intercultural theology. It is based in England and South Korea.

IAMS convenes international and regional conferences, facilitates collaborative study groups researching in mission studies, and publishes the journal Mission Studies.

IAMS members include some 50 corporate members and more than 400 individual scholars of a range of academic disciplines and Christian traditions around the world who actively research on the historical and contemporary theory, practice, and impact of the Christian mission in diverse social, economic, and political environments.

== History ==
IAMS was founded in 1972, but came from the vision of the late Olav G. Myklebust, then director of the Egede Institute in Oslo.

In 1951, Myklebust produced a thirty-five-page proposal entitled “An International Institute of Scientific Missionary Research.” He looked to “the establishment of an international association of missiologists (and others engaged in the scholarly study of mission) that from time to time would convene international conferences for the discussion of missionary subjects in a strictly scientific spirit and would publish a scholarly review of high standard.”

In 1955 “a memorandum on an international organization for the scholarly study of the Christian world mission and the history and problems of the younger churches” was discussed in Hamburg. Eleven years later in the same city the possibility of creating “a larger meeting of European missiologists which might lead to the creation of a worldwide interconfessional missiological society” was again discussed.

A European consultation on mission studies held at the Selly Oak Colleges, Birmingham, England, in April 1968 brought things closer, but the decisive turning point was in Oslo in 1970 at a second European conference on mission studies when 74 participants from different denominations, countries and continents decided that an organization would be established. As a result, the first IAMS conference was held in 1972.

== Main objectives ==
IAMS links individual scholars and missiological associations from Africa, Asia, Latin America and the Pacific together with “North America, Germany, the United Kingdom and Ireland, Scandinavia, the Netherlands, South Africa, India and elsewhere.” IAMS is now “a broadly ecumenical body including Roman Catholics, Orthodox, conciliar and evangelical Protestants, and members of the Pentecostal, charismatic and Independent churches.”

As a scholarly association, IAMS’ scholars and missionaries carry out research on Christianity, the Christian church, Christian theology, evangelism, spreading the gospel and Christianization, and other Christian-related scholarly theological disciplines. All of these are seen from missiological point of view where missiology is seen as both a research discipline and a practical reflection on the Christian mission done in specific social context.

IAMS' main goal is to bring together scholars, theologians, missiologists and missionaries who research in mission studies and can contribute to the science of missiology.

The main objectives of IAMS are;

- to promote the scholarly study of systematic, biblical, historical and practical questions relating to mission and intercultural theology
- to disseminate information concerning mission studies to all those engaged in that and related fields of study
- to promote fellowship, cooperation and mutual assistance in mission studies
- to organize international conferences of missiologists and intercultural theologians
- to encourage the creation of centres of research and scholarship
- to stimulate publications in missiology and intercultural theology.

== IAMS General Assemblies ==
Since 1972, thirteen international assemblies have been held in different countries on the different continents, each exploring specific mission studies themes:

- Driebergen, Netherlands (1972): Mission in the context of religions and secularization
- Frankurt, Germany (1974): Mission and movements of innovation in religion
- San José, Costa Rica (1976): Tradition and reconstruction in mission: where are we in mission today?
- Maryknoll, New York, U.S.A. (1978): Credibility and spirituality in mission
- Bangalore, India (1982): Christ’s mission to the multitude: salvation, suffering, and struggle
- Harare, Zimbabwe (1985): Christian mission and human transformation
- Rome, Italy (1988): Christian mission towards the third millennium: a gospel of hope
- Kaneohe, Hawaii, U.S.A. (1992): New world - new creation: mission in power and faith
- Buenos Aires, Argentina (1996): God or Mammon: economies in conflict
- Hammanskrall, South Africa (2000): Reflecting Jesus Christ: crucified and living in a broken world
- Port Dickson, Malaysia (2004): The integrity of mission in the light of the gospel: bearing the witness of the Spirit
- Balatonfüred, Hungary (2008): Human identity and the gospel of reconciliation: an agenda for mission studies and praxis in the 21st century
- Toronto, Canada (2012): Migration, human dislocation and the good news: margins as the center in Christian mission.
- Seoul, South Korea (2016): Conversions and transformations: missiological approaches to religious change.

== Governance and management ==
The association is managed by a 10-person Executive. These representatives are responsible for the IAMS’ relations with missiologists and missiological institutions, associations and schools in Europe, North America, Latin America, Asia, Africa and Oceania. A Senior Advisory Group provides a consultative level of governance.

The executive committee is chosen at each general assembly by the members present. It is responsible for the development of the Association between its general meetings and is charged to organize the next international conference. The Secretariat is usually taken charge by one of the associated institutions. Currently the Secretariat is located at the headquarters of the Church Mission Society in Oxford, United Kingdom.

As of February 2021, the general secretary was Aron Engberg, from the Centre for Theology and Religious Studies at Lund University in Sweden. He succeed Cathy Ross (missiologist), from City Mission Society, who served as general secretary from 2008 to 2018.

== Mission study groups ==
Within the association, five major study groups have been active in continuing research and consultation, which is an indispensable part of the purpose of the membership. Currently these are:

- Biblical Studies and Mission (BISAM).
- Documentation, Archives, Bibliography, and Oral History (DABOH).
- Gender in Mission.
- Healing/Pneumatology.
- Religious Freedom.

The study groups carry out research on the Bible (Old Testament and the New Testament), Christian theology and its branches (biblical, systematic and practical theology), feminist theology, missiology, pneumatology, evangelism (including the various approaches to evangelism), freedom of religion and freedom from persecution, and other Christian-related theological, anthropological and social studies disciplines.

=== Mission Studies journal ===
The IAMS’ scholarly journal Mission Studies is published by Brill in Leiden. It continues from the early newsletters of IAMS and the first edition of an academic journal in 1984. The publisher defines the aim of the journal in the following way: “The aim of Mission Studies is to enable the International Association for Mission Studies to expand its services as a forum for the scholarly study of Christian witness and its impact in the world, and the related field of intercultural theology, from international, inter-confessional and interdisciplinary perspectives.”
