= Ginghamsburg Church =

Coordinates: 39°56′24″N 84°11′32″W

- Ginghamsburg Church
- Location: 6759 South County Road 25A Tipp City, OH
- Country: United States
- Denomination: United Methodist
- Website: www.ginghamsburg.org

History
- Founded: 1863

Ginghamsburg Church is a United Methodist Church located in Tipp City, Ohio, thirteen miles north of Dayton, Ohio.

Dennis Miller became the Senior Pastor in August 2022.

== History ==
Ginghamsburg Church was founded by a Methodist circuit rider, B.W. Day, in 1863 in the village of Ginghamsburg, Ohio. As a small church, until the 1920s it was part of a four-church circuit for a part-time preacher. From the 1920s on, students from a Dayton-based seminary served as part-time pastors for the congregation.

Senior Pastor Michael Slaughter was appointed to Ginghamsburg in 1979 as the church's first full-time pastor. At the time, the church averaged approximately 90 people in attendance. After Slaughter's arrival, the mission of the church has been to "win the lost and set the oppressed free," By 2012, approximately 5,000 people attended Ginghamsburg's campuses each week. Slaughter became a leading figure in missional church movement and a popular author and speaker, and has been named one of the most influential Christians in America.

In the late 1980s and early 1990s, Ginghamsburg gained national recognition as an innovator in small group ministry. It was also an early frontrunner of cyberministry, or ministry via the Internet. The church's website and online ministry received early national attention from media outlets including The Wall Street Journal, Fox News, and The Dallas Morning News. A non-profit organization was also formed by members of the Ginghamsburg cyberministry team to help other churches develop their websites and online ministries.

In the late 1990s and early 2000s Ginghamsburg became known as a leader of the church "media reformation," which incorporated video, onscreen graphics, creative lighting, and other audio-visual elements into worship services to create a multisensory worship experience. Kim Miller, who oversaw Ginghamsburg's worship design, became a popular speaker and author on multisensory worship, writing several books on the subject.

Fort McKinley UMC became a part of Ginghamsburg Church from 2008 to 2025. Prior to July 2008, Fort McKinley was a separate United Methodist congregation, located in an economically challenged Dayton neighborhood. The church had dwindled to approximately 40 people in weekly attendance before voting to merge with Ginghamsburg. 80 volunteers from Ginghamsburg in Tipp City transplanted themselves at the newly minted Fort McKinley Campus and got to work. Neighborhood transformation took root by way of community partnerships, free food and a willingness to knock on doors. In March 2012 Ginghamsburg also started another urban campus called The Point, located in Trotwood, Ohio;. Both campuses are now closed.

== Charity work ==
Since 2005, Ginghamsburg Church invested over $6.1 million into sustainable relief projects in Darfur, Sudan through an initiative called The Sudan Project. The church first developed the initiative after Slaughter read about the War in Darfur in the early 2000s and he urged the congregation to get involved. Ginghamsburg partnered with the United Methodist Committee on Relief, which helped the church use the funds to implement sustainable agriculture, safe water, sanitation, child development, and child protection projects in Darfur. The projects have served more than 250,000 Darfuri people and over 200 schools have been built.

Every year the church holds a "Christmas is Not Your Birthday" miracle offering during the Christmas season to raise funds for The Sudan Project. As a result of the annual miracle offering, Slaughter authored a book calling on Christians to reject self-centered, consumeristic approaches to the holiday season and remember what he perceives as the true meaning of Christmas.

The church developed relief efforts in New Orleans following Hurricane Katrina. By March 2012 the church had sent over seventy teams to the city to assist in rebuilding efforts.

In 2006 Ginghamsburg held its first annual Change the World Weekend, a churchwide event in which church members commit to a weekend of community service. The conferences ran for ten years. The idea led to the United Methodist denomination making it a denomination-wide event in which thousands of churches around the world participate in a weekend of community service. The event corresponded with the release of Slaughter's book Change the World: Recovering the Mission and Message of Jesus.

== Campuses ==
The church's Main Campus sits on 127 acres (0.51 km^{2}) of land just outside Tipp City. Hundreds of teenagers from the Dayton area visit The Avenue youth center weekly for spiritual classes as well as outreach events.

The Care Campus houses The Ark, which is the original Ginghamsburg Church building and is now a practicum center for training events. The Care Campus also serves as the operating headquarters of New Path Outreach Ministries and New Creation Counseling Center.

== Non-profit organizations ==
Ginghamsburg Church houses four 501(c)(3) non-profit organizations founded by Ginghamsburg members.

New Path Outreach operates nineteen separate community service ministries within the Dayton area, including two food pantries and car, furniture, clothing, medical equipment, pet care, rent/utility assistance, two stores and other ministries. New Path currently serves over 40,000 people in the Dayton area.

New Creation Counseling Center provides counseling to community members, regardless of their ability to pay.

The Clubhouse (Dreambuilders) After-School Ministry has seven Dayton-area locations. Each year more than 400 trained teenagers tutor, mentor, and play with at-risk children. The Clubhouse program was awarded a Point of Light award from President George H. W. Bush and the Presidential Voluntary Action Award from President Bill Clinton, among other awards. Clubhouse is now an outreach ministry of New Path.

Web-Empowered Church, helps churches and parachurch organizations develop their websites, improve their online presence, and better utilize online resources by offering software help and consulting, as well as a number of classes, tutorials, and workshops. The non-profit was founded by Mark Stephenson, who was Director of CyberMinistry and Technology at Ginghamsburg from 1998 to 2010.

== Conferences and events ==
In 2009, the church hosted a special event on the War in Darfur with John Prendergast and Omer Ismail. The event was broadcast live on the Christian Communications Network to churches around the country.

The church also sponsors and hosts a number of other conferences, seminars, and events annually, sometimes in conjunction with United Theological Seminary, a United Methodist seminary located just outside Dayton. It has also regularly hosted concerts, featuring acts such as Toby Mac, For King and Country, and Gungor.
