= Multisensory worship =

Multisensory worship or multi-sensory worship is a form of alternative worship, often associated with the emerging church. Multisensory worship is usually corporate worship that is designed to engage the senses.

Proponents of multisensory worship often contend that in the postmodern world people don't simply want to hear about God or sing about God, but instead want to feel and experience the presence of God. It frequently involves the use of video and onscreen graphics which are designed to speak to people through the power of the image. Audio-visual elements are often added to supplement sermons and teaching. Thus multisensory worship involves a great deal of experimentation and variety in crafting a more holistic worship experience. Spaces designed for multisensory worship often feature floral arrangements, paintings, and creative lighting to enhance the experience of participants. Multisensory worship is part prayer, part worship, sometimes using prayer stations to evoke the physical senses. As opposed to just reading a book or hearing a sermon, a room is set up for participants to have an experience that involves the physical body in the act of worship.

An early pioneer of multisensory worship, Leonard Sweet, has a theory that worship should be EPIC in nature: experiential, participatory, image-rich and connective.

Another early proponent, Bob Rognlien, wrote in his book Experiential Worship that worship should engage the heart, soul, mind and strength.

See also the books Handbook for MultiSensory Worship Volumes I and II and Redesigning Worship, all by Kim Miller of Ginghamsburg Church in Tipp City, Ohio, and the works of Greg Atkinson who also speaks and writes on multisensory worship, leadership, and hospitality.
