= Doctor of Missiology =

Degree

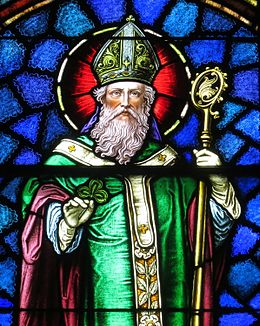
Stained glass window of St. Patrick, early Christian missionary to Ireland as portrayed at St. Patrick Catholic Church, Junction City, Ohio.

The Doctor of Missiology (abbreviated DMiss or D.Miss.) is a doctoral degree in the field of missiology.

== North America ==
The Doctor of Missiology (DMiss) is an advanced theological degree offered by a number of universities, divinity schools, and seminaries. The Association of Theological Schools classifies the Doctor of Missiology as an "Advanced Program Oriented Toward Ministerial Leadership". Admission to DMiss programs requires possession of an appropriate master's degree (such as the Master of Divinity) and also requires prior professional experience as a Christian missionary or minister. Though questions about the viability of the DMiss have been raised as it has been outpaced in offering institutions by the Doctor of Ministry (D.Min.) it continues to be successfully offered by prominent theological schools such as Fuller Theological Seminary and The Southern Baptist Theological Seminary.

DMiss students are required to complete a doctoral project, thesis, or dissertation and "demonstrate an advanced competency in the practice of ministry; give evidence of being informed by analytic, ministerial, and disciplinary research; and show the integration of these areas of advanced knowledge with opportunities for growth in one's ministerial capacity and spiritual maturity." DMiss can be used as an academic qualification for the instruction of missiology or evangelism.

In some cases, the Doctor of Missions degree is run concurrently or as an alternative title for the similar Doctor of Intercultural Studies degree.
