= Missio Dei =

Latin Christian theological term

Missio Dei is a Latin Christian theological term that can be translated as the "mission of God", or the "sending of God".

It is a concept which has become increasingly important in missiology and in understanding the mission of the church since the second half of the 20th century. Some of its key proponents include David Bosch, Lesslie Newbigin, and Darrell Guder.

== History ==
In 1934, the German missiologist Karl Hartenstein first coined the term missio Dei to distinguish it from the missio ecclesiae, that is, the mission of the church. Some scholars hold that this coinage, which can be traced as far back as Augustine, had a strong trinitarian basis. This language, it is argued, was picked up at the 1952 Willingen conference of the International Missionary Council (IMC) and developed theologically by Lutheran theologian, Georg Vicedom.

However, John Flett maintains that while Hartenstein did introduce the actual term missio Dei, he did not locate that mission in the doctrine of the Trinity. Such reference to the Trinity appeared in the "American report", a study document prepared for the 1952 Willingen conference, under the leadership of Paul Lehmann and H. Richard Niebuhr.

== Description ==
The "American report" suggested a link between revolutionary movements in history and "God's mission". Many of the later contentions with missio Dei stem from these origins, and especially the failure to ground the concept in a robust account of the Trinity.

The acknowledged concerns with missio Dei also meant that reference to the concept went through a hiatus until it was given concise description by David Bosch. According to David J. Bosch, "mission is not primarily an activity of the church, but an attribute of God. God is a missionary God." Jürgen Moltmann says, "It is not the church that has a mission of salvation to fulfill in the world; it is the mission of the Son and the Spirit through the Father that includes the church." According to one opinion:

During the past half a century or so there has been a subtle but nevertheless decisive shift toward understanding mission as God's mission. During preceding centuries mission was understood in a variety of ways. Sometimes it was interpreted primarily in soteriological terms: as saving individuals from eternal damnation. Or it was understood in cultural terms: as introducing people from East and the South to the blessings and privileges of the Christian West. Often it was perceived in ecclesiastical categories: as the expansion of the church (or of a specific denomination). Sometimes it was defined salvation-historically: as the process by which the world—evolutionary or by means of a cataclysmic event—would be transformed into the kingdom of God. In all these instances, and in various, frequently conflicting ways, the intrinsic interrelationship between christology, soteriology, and the doctrine of the Trinity, so important for the early church, was gradually displaced by one of several versions of the doctrine of grace …

Mission was understood as being derived from the very nature of God. It was thus put in the context of the doctrine of the Trinity, not of ecclesiology or soteriology. The classical doctrine on the missio Dei as God the Father sending the Son, and God the Father and the Son sending the Spirit was expanded to include yet another "movement": The Father, Son and the Holy Spirit sending the church into the world. As far as missionary thinking was concerned, this linking with the doctrine of the Trinity constituted an important innovation …

Our mission has not life of its own: only in the hands of the sending God can it truly be called mission. Not least since the missionary initiative comes from God alone …

Mission is thereby seen as a movement from God to the world; the church is viewed as an instrument for that mission. There is church because there is mission, not vice versa. To participate in mission is to participate in the movement of God's love toward people, since God is a fountain of sending love.

Speaking on behalf of The Gospel and Our Culture Network, Darrell Guder writes, "We have come to see that mission is not merely an activity of the church. Rather, mission is the result of God's initiative, rooted in God's purposes to restore and heal creation. 'Mission' means 'sending,' and it is the central biblical theme describing the purpose of God's action in human history.... We have begun to learn that the biblical message is more radical, more inclusive, more transforming than we have allowed it to be. In particular, we have begun to see that the church of Jesus Christ is not the purpose or goal of the gospel, but rather its instrument and witness.... God's mission is calling and sending us, the church of Jesus Christ, to be a missionary church in our own societies, in the cultures in which we find ourselves."

Alan Hirsch believes the word missional "goes to the heart of the very nature and purpose of the church itself." He continues, "So a working definition of missional church is a community of God's people that defines itself, and organizes its life around, its real purpose of being an agent of God's mission to the world. In other words, the church's true and authentic organizing principle is mission. When the church is in mission, it is the true church. The church itself is not only a product of that mission but is obligated and destined to extend it by whatever means possible. The mission of God flows directly through every believer and every community of faith that adheres to Jesus. To obstruct this is to block God's purposes in and through God's people."

Peters states that the Bible claims "the end result of such missio Dei is the glorification of the Father, Son, and Holy Spirit."

== Bibliography ==
- Aagaard, Anna Marie. "Missio Dei in katholischer Sicht." Evangelische Theologie 34 (1974): 420–433.
- Aagaard, Anna Marie. "Missiones Dei: A Contribution to the Discussion on the Concept of Mission." In The Gospel and the Ambiguity of the Church, edited by Vilmos Vajta, 68–91. Philadelphia, PA: Fortress, 1974.
- Crum, Winston F. "Missio Dei and the Church: An Anglican Perspective." St Vladimir's Theological Quarterly 17, no. 4 (1973): 285–289.
- Daugherty, Kevin. "Missio Dei: The Trinity and Christian Missions." Evangelical Review of Theology 31, no. 2 (2007): 151–168.
- Flett, John G. "Missio Dei: A Trinitarian Envisioning of a Non-Trinitarian Theme." Missiology 37, no. 1 (2009): 5–18.
- Flett, John G. The Witness of God: the Trinity, Missio Dei, Karl Barth and the Nature of Christian Community. Grand Rapids, MI: Eerdmans, 2010.
- Günther, Wolfgang. "Gott selbst treibt Mission: Das Modell der 'Missio Dei'." In Plädoyer für Mission: Beiträge zum Verständnis von Mission heute, edited by Klaus Schäfer, 56–63. Hamburg: Evangelische Missionswerk in Deutschland, 1998.
- Jost, Peter Samuel. "Karl Hartenstein und die missio Dei." Interkulturelle Theologie 36, no. 3–4 (2010): 305–325.
- Matthey, Jacques. "Reconciliation, Missio Dei and the Church's Mission." In Mission – Violence and Reconciliation: Papers Read at the Biennial Conference of the British and Irish Association for Mission Studies at the University of Edinburgh, June 2003, edited by Howard Mellor, and Timothy Yates, 113–137. Sheffield: Cliff College Publishing, 2004.
- Matthey, Jacques. "Serving God's Mission Together in Christ's Way: Reflections on the Way to Edinburgh 2010." International Review of Mission 99, no. 1 (2010): 21–38.
- Meiring, Arno. "Rethinking Missio Dei: a conversation with postmodern and African Theologies." Verbum et Ecclesia 1, no. 3 (2008): 791–818.
- Meyers, Ruth A. "Missional Church, Missional Liturgy." Theology Today 67, no. 1 (2010): 36–50.
- Poitras, Edward W. "St Augustine and the Missio Dei: A Reflection on Mission at the Close of the Twentieth Century." Mission Studies 16, no. 2 (1999): 28–46.
- Richebächer, Wilhelm. "Missio Dei: The Basis of Mission Theology or a Wrong Path?" International Review of Mission 92, no. 4 (2003): 588–605.
- Robertson, Lindsay G. "Missio Dei: Karl Barth and the mission of the church." Hill Road 9, no. 2 (2006): 3–19.
- Rosin, H. H. 'Missio Dei': An Examination of the Origin, Contents and Function of the Term in Protestant Missiological Discussion. Leiden: Interuniversity Institute for Missiological and Ecumenical Research, Department of Missiology, 1972.
- Scherer, James A. "Church, Kingdom and Missio Dei: Lutheran and Orthodox Corrections to Recent Ecumenical Mission Theology." In The Good News of the Kingdom: Mission Theology for the Third Millennium, edited by Charles van Engen, Dean S. Gilliland, Paul Everett Pierson, and Arthur F. Glasser, 82–88. Maryknoll, NY: Orbis, 1993.
- Schulz, Klaus Detlev. "Tension in the Pneumatology of the Missio Dei Concept." Concordia Theological Journal 23, no. 2 (1997): 99–107.
- Suess, Paulo. "Missio Dei and the Project of Jesus: The Poor and the 'Other' as Mediators of the Kingdom of God and Protagonists of the Churches." International Review of Mission 92, no. 4 (2003): 550–559.
- Sundermeier, Theo. "Missio Dei Today: On the Identity of Christian Mission." International Review of Mission 92, no. 4 (2003): 579–587.
- Verkuyl, Johannes. "The Kingdom of God as the Goal of the Missio Dei." International Review of Mission 68 (1979): 168–175.
- Vicedom, Georg F. Missio Dei: Einführung in eine Theologie der Mission. München: Chr. Kaiser Verlag, 1958.
- Walton, Roger. "Have we got the Missio dei right?" Epworth Review 35, no. 3 (2008): 39–51.
- Wickeri, Philip L. "Mission from the Margins: The Missio Dei in the Crisis of World Christianity." International Review of Mission 93, no. 2 (2004): 182–198.
