= Anchor Gaslamp =

Coordinates: 32.71373°N 117.16038°W

- Anchor Gaslamp Logo
- Anchor Gaslamp
- Location: San Diego, California
- Country: United States
- Denomination: Christian Missional
- Website: AnchorGaslamp.com

History
- Founded: 2007
- Founder(s): Karlton Edison, Vince Larson

Clergy
- Pastor(s): Karlton Edison, Vince Larson

The Anchor Gaslamp was a Christian community in downtown San Diego, California. It is missional in intent and incarnational in practice. Since the first gathering on Easter Sunday in 2008 the group has attracted a diverse congregation. They have since moved to East Village and changed their name to New City Church

== Gatherings ==
Anchor Gaslamp met on the first three Sundays of the month in the heart of downtown San Diego's Gaslamp Quarter. The gatherings were held upstairs in The Keating Hotel located on the corner of 5th & F St.). On the other Sundays, the Community joined for Anchor in Action which are mission-driven events all over the city, with the sole purpose of "not just going to church, but being the church." These Sundays ranged in activities from homeless barbecues to delivering truckloads of donated goods to orphanages and women's recovery homes in Baja California.

The larger community was made up of other smaller communities that met throughout the week. All other meetings, services, or mission-events were derived out of these communities, which met in various locations throughout the city.

== History ==
The Church began as a church planting project of The Anchor Church, formerly Revival Tabernacle, located in the Oak Park area of San Diego. It was initially established as a Bible study group under the direction of Pastors Karlton Edison and Vince Larson in 2007. During this time the group met in the Downtown San Diego area, in locations which varied from restaurants to hotels to coffee houses until its first Sunday Gathering in a nightclub on Easter Sunday, 2008.

Anchor Gaslamp was a nondenominational church, whose doctrinal view was in alignment with the Nicene Creed. They are now called New City Church.
