= Robert J. Banks (theologian) =

Australian Christian thinker

Robert John Banks (born August 6, 1939) is an Australian Christian thinker, writer and practitioner. He is a biblical scholar, practical theologian and cultural critic, as well as an educator and church planter.

== Early life ==
Robert Banks was born in Sydney in 1939, raised and educated there, and studied arts/law at Sydney University. In 1959 he entered Moore Theological College and on graduating three years later married Julie Lonsdale Johnson. After ordination and ministry at Holy Trinity Anglican Church in Adelaide, he completed an MTh at King's College in the University of London and a PhD in New Testament on Jesus' attitude to the Law at Clare College Cambridge University. In 1969 he resigned from the Anglican Church on the grounds of its status distinction between clergy and laity, its ceremonial view of the sacraments and its over-emphasis on its members serving the institution and activities of the church rather than fulfilling their vocation in and witnessing to the world.

Returning to Australia in 1969, he was appointed as a Research Fellow in the History of Ideas Unit at the Australian National University, Canberra. During this time he helped develop several home-based congregations in the city, was a theological consultant to people of faith in the Public Service and started a theological program for lay people. In 1974 he became Senior Lecturer in Ancient History at Macquarie University, Sydney. His publications during this time included books on early Christian idea of community, the tyranny of time, private values and public policy, and going to church in the first century.

== Mid life ==
In 1989 he was appointed Foundation Professor in the Ministry of the Laity at Fuller Theological Seminary, Los Angeles, where he introduced a Master of Arts in Christian Leadership for lay people and a Doctorate in Practical Theology. He helped to found a national Coalition for Ministry in Daily Life, was on the Board of InterVarsity Fellowship's Marketplace Ministries and supported independent and denominational home-based congregations in Los Angeles and other parts of North America. In the mid-1990s he became the first executive director of the De Pree Leadership Center at Fuller Seminary.

His interest in film led to his becoming the first Director of an annual City of the Angels Film Festival, held at the Director's Guild in Los Angeles. This focussed on mainstream and independent films containing spiritual and moral themes. Along with books on God as worker and re-envisioning theological education, he wrote and edited others on relating faith to work, leading with spirit, and Christianity in everyday life.

== Later life ==
In 1999 he returned to Australia where, shortly afterwards, his wife Julie died. He then became the first Director and Dean of the Christian Studies Institute at Macquarie University, Sydney, which offered degree level courses to university students and professional development for Christians in the workplace. In 2000 he married Linda Hope. In the following years he wrote books on everyday theology, religion in film, and apologetics.

In 2004 a Festschrift was produced in his honour with contributions from fifteen scholars around the world, including Edwin Judge, John Drane, Miroslav Volf and James Dunn. In 2019, an issue of the journal Zadok Perspectives, containing articles by several Australian Christian thinkers was published to celebrate his 80th birthday. He and Linda have also created several biblically based resource materials for small groups, and written four books about the contribution of especially women missionaries to the emergence of modern China. In China, Banks has spoken in seminaries, a university, and several times at the annual Bible in China Seminar sponsored by the Shanghai Academy of Social Sciences and United Bible Societies.

He holds a Visiting Professorship at Fuller Theological Seminary, is an Honorary Professor at Alphacrucis College, Sydney and Adjunct Research Professor at the Australian Centre for Christianity & Culture, Charles Sturt University in Canberra. He has addressed university and theological audiences, marketplace and non-profit organisations, organic and life-engaged churches, mixed religious and secular audiences, interested in the role of faith in contemporary society in Asia and Europe as well as Australia. Drawing partly on earlier writings he has produced a new book on the versatility of Paul, and also expanded his earlier publications on work and vocation. with new material. A number of his books have been translated into other languages, namely Korean, Japanese, Portuguese, Danish, Chinese, Persian and German, and he has also won Book of the Year awards in Australia, Canada and the United States. He is a member of the Tyndale Fellowship for Biblical and Theological Research in England, the international Society for New Testament Studies and, with his wife Linda, the Yale-Edinburgh Group on the History of Missions and World Christianity.

== Major publications ==
- Jesus and the Law in the Synoptic Tradition, Cambridge University Press, Cambridge, 1975
- Paul's Idea of Community: The Early House Churches in Their Historical Setting, Anzea, Sydney; Paternoster, Exeter and Eerdmans, Grand Rapids, 1980, revised version by Hendricksen Press, 1994, 3rd edition, with new subtitle 'Spirit and Culture in Early House Churches', by Baker Press, 2020.
- Going to Church in the First Century, Hexagon Press, Sydney, 1980.
- The Tyranny of Time, Anzea, Sydney; Paternoster, Exeter; InterVarsity Press, Downer's Grove, 1983.
- Re-envisioning Theological Education: A Missional Approach to Ministry Formation, Grand Rapids: Eerdmans, 1999.
- All the Business of Life: Bringing Theology Down-To-Earth, Albatross, Sydney; Lion, Tring, 1987, revised and expanded as "Redeeming the Routines: Bringing Theology to Life", Grand Rapids: Baker, 1993.
- God the Worker: Journeys into the Mind, Heart, and Imagination of God, Sydney, Albatross, 1992; Valley Forge: Judson, 1994
- And Man Created God: Is God a Human Invention?, Tring: Lion Hudson/Kregel, 2010.
- Daily Work as Divine Vocation: A Christian Perspective, Singapore: Ethos Centre for Public Christianity, 2017.
- A Day in the Life of an Early Christian, Seoul: IVP Korea, 2018, 2nd ed. Albury: Studio, 2020.
- Stepping Out in Mission under Caesar's Shadow, Seoul: IVP Korea, 2020.
- The Versatility of Paul: Artisan Missionary, Community Builder, Pastoral Educator, Bagiou: APTS Seminary, 2022; Eugene: Wipf & Stock, 1923.
- Transforming Daily Work into a Divine Vocation, Eugene: Wopf & Stock, 1923.
- The Home Church: Regrouping the People of God for Community and Mission, Sydney: Albatross (Tring/Lion), 1986, revised and republished by Hendricksen Press, 1998.
- (with Kim Powell), Faith in Leadership: Why it Matters and What Difference it Makes, San Francisco: Jossey-Bass, 2000.
- (with Michael Frost) Lessons from Reel Life: Movies, Meaning and Myth-Making, Open Book, 2001.
- (with Bernice Ledbetter) Reviewing Leadership: A Christian Evaluation of Current Approaches, Baker, 2004, revised and expanded edition (with also David Greenhalgh), 2016.
- Ed. Reconciliation and Hope: New Testament Essays on Atonement and Eschatology, Paternoster, Exeter and Eerdmans, Grand Rapids, 1974.
- Ed. Private Lives and Public Policy: The Ethics of Decision Making in Government Administration, Anzea, Sydney, 1983.
- Ed. (with R.Paul Stevens), The Complete Book of Everyday Christianity: An A-Z Guide to Following Christ in Every Aspect of Life, Dower's Grove: IVP, 1997.
- Ed. (with Paul Stevens), Thoughtful Parenting: A Manual of Wisdom for Marriage and Family, Downer's Grove: InterVarsity Press, 2001.
- Ed. (with Paul Stevens), The Marketplace Ministry Handbook, Regent College, 2005.
- (with Linda Banks) View From the Faraway Pagoda: A Pioneer Australian Missionary in China from the Boxer Rebellion to the Communist Insurgency, Acorn, 2012
- (with Linda Banks) They Shall See His Face": The Story of Amy Oxley Wilkinson and her Visionary Blind School in China, Melbourne: Acorn, 2018; revised version Wipf & Stock, 2021.
- (with Linda Banks) Through the Valley of the Shadow: Australian Women in War-Torn China, Eugene, OR: Wipf & Stock, 2019.
- (with Linda Banks) Children of the Massacre: The Extraordinary Story of the Stewart Family in Hong Kong and West China, Eugene: Wipf and Stock, 2021.
