= Michael Frost (minister) =

Australian missiologist and theologian (born 1961)

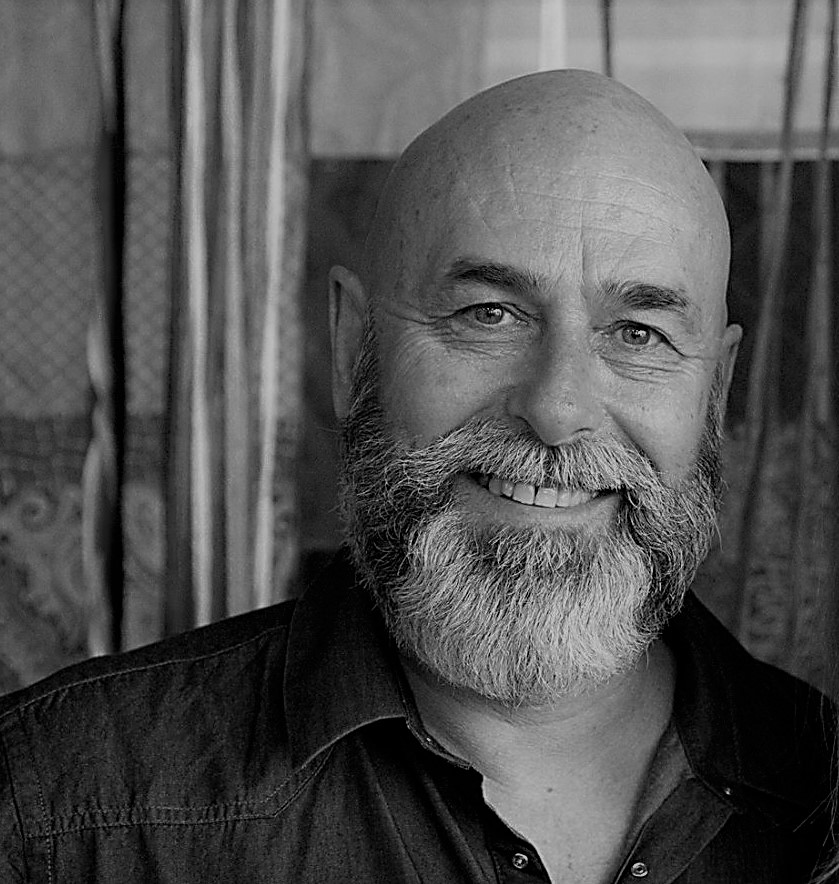

Michael Frost (born 1961) is an Australian Baptist minister, missiologist and theologian who is one of the leading voices in the missional church movement. Frost is the founding Director of the Tinsley Institute, a mission study centre located at Morling College in Sydney, Australia.

== Career ==
Frost is the author or editor of 20 theological books, including The Shaping of Things to Come (2003), Exiles (2006), The Road to Missional (2011) and Surprise the World (2016). These books explore a missional framework for the church in a post-Christendom era. Frost's work has been translated into German, Korean, Chinese, and Spanish. Frost is a popular inspirational speaker at Christian conferences and has spoken at conferences in the United States, the United Kingdom and across Europe.

In 1999, Frost and Alan Hirsch founded the Forge Mission Training Network, a program for training missional leaders. He remains an international director of that movement which is now based in the United States. In 2002, he founded the missional Christian community, smallboatbigsea, based in Manly in Sydney's north. He wrote a weekly religion column for the Manly Daily from 2002 until it was axed in 2014, and helped establish Action Against Poverty, a localised micro-financing agency, linking the cities of Manly and Manado in Indonesia.

In August 2016, Frost was arrested while praying in the Sydney offices of the then-Prime Minister, Malcolm Turnbull, as part of an action organized by the group Love Makes a Way. Then in November 2017, Frost was arrested again alongside other Australian Christian leaders after chaining themselves to the gates of the Prime Minister's Sydney residence in protest of Australia's treatment of refugees and asylum seekers on Manus Island.

A 2017 Washington Post essay by Frost about Tim Tebow, Colin Kaepernick, and Christianity was widely reprinted. Tebow had drawn public attention for kneeling in prayer before football games, Kaepernick, for kneeling in protest. In the essay, Frost described Tebow and Kaepernick as representing two different versions of Christianity. Tebow's version is a Christianity of "personal piety, gentleness, respect for cultural mores and an emphasis on moral issues like abortion, homosexuality," while Kaepernick version "values social justice, community development, racial reconciliation and political activism." In Frost's view, this "bifurcation of contemporary Christianity into two distinct branches" with each side unable to value the moral lessons the other side offers, explains why "Christianity remains on its knees in the West."

In his 2018 book, Keep Christianity Weird, Frost calls on pastors to use eccentric and unconventional approaches in their ministry to produce "greater creativity and innovation."

== Books ==
- Jesus the Fool (1994; 2007; 2010)
- Longing for Love (1996)
- Seeing God in the Ordinary (1998; 2000)
- Lessons from Reel Life (2001) co-authored with Robert Banks
- Freedom to Explore (2001)
- The Shaping of Things to Come (2003, 2013) co-authored with Alan Hirsch
- Speaking of Mission (2006) - editor
- Exiles (2006)
- ReJesus (2008, 2021) co-authored with Alan Hirsch
- The Faith of Leap (2011) co-authored with Alan Hirsch
- The Road to Missional (2011)
- The Big Ideas (2011)
- Speaking of Mission Vol.2 (2013) - editor
- Incarnate (2014) InterVarsity Press (2014)
- Surprise the World! (2016)
- To Alter Your World (2017) co-authored with Christiana Rice
- Keep Christianity Weird (2018)
- Not in Kansas Anymore (2020) co-edited with Darrell Jackson and David Starling
- Hide This in Your Heart (2020) co-authored with Graham Joseph Hill
- Mission is the Shape of Water (2023)
