= Practical charismatic theology =

Subset of Christian Theology

Practical charismatic theology is a subset of Christian theology that teaches how to practically apply the principles of Charismatic Christianity in the everyday life of a believer. Theology is the study of the nature of God and religious beliefs. Practical charismatic theology takes this a step further by incorporating these beliefs into an individual believer's lifestyle. Practical charismatic theology focuses on integrating charismatic Christian beliefs into an individual's lifestyle, with the goal of achieving what Jesus instructed his followers to pray for: "on earth as it is in heaven." Applying theology in this way has been reported as bringing about transformative changes in people's lives, faith healing as a result of prayer, and dramatic changes in entire communities.

== Theological theory ==
Richard Osmer posited that there are four key questions in regard to the concept of practical theology.

1. What is going on?
2. Why is this going on?
3. What ought to be going on?
4. How might we respond?

Each of these questions go to the core of how to apply Christian faith in everyday life. Practical theological theory shows Christians how to apply their beliefs to answer the overarching question of how to respond to what is happening in society by being the answer. The proper Christian response to any situation that does not fit a Biblical worldview is to be an ambassador for Jesus by loving everyone the same, not being judgemental, and bringing healing and deliverance to those who need it.

=== Lifestyle Christianity ===
Lifestyle is an additional phrase used to describe this practical charismatic theology concept and is used mostly by those in Todd White's ministry circles.

== Changing culture ==
There has been a dramatic change in the landscape of charismatic Christianity since the events of the Toronto Blessing. The reported numbers of supernatural healings, freedom from demonic oppression, and relational restorations have brought about a cultural change within many charismatic churches and have also had a secondary effect on culture outside the church. These cultural changes have been attributed to Christians learning about the identity they are said to have in the Christian Bible, changing how they think about themselves and others, and learning to live a supernatural lifestyle.

=== Kingdom perspective ===
A key to understanding how to positively impact culture is to grasp the Kingdom of God's perspective. Jesus taught his followers to pray for God to make earth look like heaven. Followers of Jesus today can positively change culture by living a lifestyle that brings about this change. In heaven, there is no death, no pain, and no sadness, so there shouldn't be any here either. This kingdom perspective reportedly has provided believers with a mindset shift of their own, enabling them to step out in faith with the expectation that their actions will make a great impact. A Christian worldview describes how one views the world through biblical or Christian beliefs or through the perspective of the Kingdom of Heaven.

=== Christian identity ===
Historically, Christian believers have been able to effect this level of cultural change only by knowing their true spiritual identity. History has shown that ministers living from the perspective of being a child of God, with God-given authority to operate in supernatural gifts, have been the most effective in shifting cultural changes in small pockets of society. In more recent history, everyday believers have also come to realize the authority given to them and have begun to effect change in their own communities and areas of influence. These believers have learned how to represent Jesus in everyday situations and environments.

=== Historical revival movements ===
Historical revival movements such as the Azusa Street Revival and the Toronto Blessing have provided evidence that the church can have a greatly positive impact on society as a whole, not just from a religious perspective, but also in areas of compassion for the poor and accepting people of all races and beliefs.

=== Society's impact on the Christian Church ===
Large sections of society view the Christian church negatively, and this has affected the church negatively. As a result, church leaders retreated into the four walls of their buildings and lost the same level of impact they had previously. This led to the decline of Christianity in the Western world, positively impacting non-Christian culture, and brought about the reverse: non-Christian culture having an impact on the church. All of this is likely a result of the church being known for what it is against, rather than for what it is for. Re-establishing the church's role in society has become the key element to changing this mindset.

== Love and honor ==
A core element of practical charismatic theology is for believers to love and honor every person who stands in front of them. Biblical texts agree with this in 1 Corinthian 13 where the idea of Christian action, without love, is presented as pointless. [Heidi Baker] is often quoted as saying "stop for the one;" a concept that has brought transformation throughout Mozambique, Africa. If every person is created in God’s image, then every person should be honored, loved, and valued for who they are; namely, a wonderfully created being. Treating people with this level of respect changes their hearts over time and allows for that transformation to further spread into their families and communities.

== Supernatural gifts ==
The Christian Bible, in 1 Corinthians 12:4–11, lists spiritual gifts that the author believed are available to followers of Jesus. Practical Charismatic theology argues that these gifts are then used by God in powerful ways that no other religious or faith system incorporates. Signs and wonders are also closely connected to the spiritual gifts.

=== Healing ===
Healing is the gift that removes physical and emotional wounds, in the same way Jesus did when he walked the earth. These healing miracles have been occurring for more than 2,000 years throughout numerous liturgical and Protestant denominations. And they continue today around the world.

=== Prophecy ===
Prophecy is the gift that tells people God's plans for their future as is seen throughout the Old and New Testaments of the Bible.

=== Words of knowledge ===
Words of knowledge is the gift that allows a believer to supernaturally know what is currently true in a situation or a person's life. This can be effective when ministering healing, deliverance, or prophetically to a person. There are a variety of ways a believer can receive words of knowledge and a variety of impacts. The most common ways to receive a word of knowledge is through feeling it, thinking it, hearing it, dreaming it, seeing it, reading it, or watching it. Feeling it refers to feeling physical pain or other sensations in an area of the body where someone is in need of physical healing. Thinking it refers to receiving mental impressions, or more simply put, thoughts, directly from Holy Spirit about something or someone. It is also possible to hear God audibly speak, and that is how to receive a word of knowledge through hearing it. Dreaming it is when Holy Spirit shows us information in our dreams, similar to the many stories in the Old Testament of the Bible. There have been many reported instances of people seeing injured body parts enlarged or superimposed on someone who is in need of healing. For example, they may see a shoulder that is much larger than it is in real life and it draws attention to that particular person; this is seeing it. Reading it refers to seeing words or phrases appear in mid-air, over people, or over other objects. Watching it is similar to reading or dreaming it. It is a category where the believer has an open vision and sees a scenario play out in front of them as if they were watching a movie. Finally, saying it, which is possibly the strangest of all known ways to receive a word of knowledge is to speak it out without even realizing you are saying it. Believers have reported this happening when, in a normal conversation, blurting out something that seems completely random but turns out to be a revelation from God.

=== Words of wisdom ===
Words of wisdom is the gift that provides believers with the wisdom on the best actions to take in a given situation.

=== Discernment ===
The gift of discernment gives believers the ability to know the difference between good and evil spirits, as well as to people's known or unknown interaction with these spirits.
