= Ginghamsburg, Ohio =

Unincorporated community in Ohio, U.S.

Coordinates: 39°55′47″N 84°11′58″W

Ginghamsburg is an unincorporated community in Miami County, in the U.S. state of Ohio.

== History ==
The community was named for Silas "Gingham" Wells, a local merchant whose nickname was derived from his coat made of gingham fabric. A post office called Ginghamsburgh was established in 1867, the name was changed to Ginghamsburg in 1893, and the post office closed in 1905. Besides the post office, Ginghamsburg had a country store.

== See also ==
- Ginghamsburg Church
