= David Bosch =

Missiologist and theologian (1929–1992)

- Born: David Jacobus Bosch; 13 December 1929; Kuruman, Union of South Africa
- Died: 15 April 1992 (aged 62); N4 between Belfast, Mpumalanga and Middelburg, Mpumalanga, South Africa
- Education: University of Pretoria
- Occupation: Theologian
- Spouse: Annemie Bosch

David Jacobus Bosch (13 December 1929 – 15 April 1992) was an influential missiologist and theologian best known for his book Transforming Mission: Paradigm Shifts in Theology of Mission (1991) — a major work on post-colonial Christian mission. He was a member of the Dutch Reformed Church in South Africa (NGK), also known by its English abbreviation DRC. On Freedom Day, 27 April 2013, he posthumously received the Order of the Baobab from the President of South Africa "for his selfless struggle for equality ... and his dedication to community upliftment. By doing so, he lived the values of non-racialism against the mainstream of his own culture."

== Early life ==
Bosch was born in Kuruman, Cape Province, in the Union of South Africa. He was raised in a nationalist Afrikaner home with little regard for his nation's black citizens and, when the National Party (South Africa) came to power in 1948 and began implementing its program of apartheid, Bosch welcomed it.

That same year however, Bosch began studying and teaching at the University of Pretoria, where he joined the Student Christian Association and was more exposed to black members of the community. This began a lifelong involvement in Christian mission and he was soon questioning the apartheid system.

== Missionary career ==
Sensing a call to be a missionary, Bosch changed to the theological school and graduated with a Bachelor of Divinity and a Master of Arts in languages (Afrikaans, Dutch, German). He then went to Switzerland to study for his doctorate in the field of New Testament at the University of Basel, under Oscar Cullmann, who influenced Bosch to accommodate more ecumenism.

In 1957 Bosch began a decade working as a missionary with the DRC planting churches in the Transkei.

== Professor of missiology ==
In 1967 he took up a position as lecturer in church history and missiology at the DRC's Theological School training black church leaders in the Transkei, where he also built ties with the Roman Catholic and Anglican churches, and began to develop his ministry of writing on mission theory. Bosch wrote about his concerns that the Christian mission to bring good news to black Africans could be confused with colonial and nationalistic motives that entrenched racial divisions.

What is the end goal of mission with such a motivation? Is it to maintain the white people in South Africa—or is it the foundation of the church of Christ...? Is it to serve South Africa—or to serve God? Is it to hear together the sentimental voice of our own blood—or to hear together the last command of Christ? Have we, by this missionary motive, created a sheep in wolf's clothes—or is it perhaps a wolf in sheep's clothes?

Isolated from the majority in the DRC who supported apartheid, Bosch left his college in 1971 to become Professor of Missiology at the University of South Africa in Pretoria, which at the time was South Africa's only interracial university. There he edited its journal "Theologia Evangelica" and continued to write.

He was offered the Chair of Mission and Ecumenics at Princeton Theological Seminary in New Jersey, United States but chose to remain working against apartheid from within South Africa and the DRC. In 1979 he helped coordinate the South African Christian Leadership Assembly, which was a gathering of more than 5,000 African Christians from diverse backgrounds, to demonstrate that the church could be an alternative community embodying the Kingdom of God.

In 1982 he promoted an open letter to the DRC, signed by more than 100 pastors and theologians, publicly condemning apartheid and calling on the church to unite with black churches.

Bosch also bridged evangelical and ecumenical divisions in the global church, participating in both the Lausanne Congress and World Evangelical Alliance events, while also serving the World Council of Churches. He was an active member of the International Association for Mission Studies, the key leader and inspiration of the South African Missiological Society, and founding editor of its journal, Missionalia.

He was fluent in Xhosa, Afrikaans, Dutch, German and English, and lectured widely in Europe, Britain, and North America.

Missiologist Wilbert R. Shenk, senior Professor at Fuller Theological Seminary, writes the following of Bosch in the foreword to Believing in the Future

David Bosch's tragic death in an automobile accident April 15, 1992, has left all of us who have known him as a friend, colleague, outstanding mission theologian, and church statesman with a sense of inseparable loss. He combined in his life and ministry first-rate scholarship and devoted Christian discipleship. His loyalty to his native land, South Africa, seemed to be intensified precisely by a personal integrity that required that he live out what he understood the gospel to entail. David Bosch knew existentially, and to a degree most of us never reach, what it means to live and work against the stream of culture—to be countercultural. He was the prophet among us. Along with his vast knowledge of the field of biblical studies, theology, church history, and missiology, David Bosch had the rare ability to distill the insight and wisdom to meet the demands of the day. His broad sympathies with all parts of the Christian family and his gifts of communication made him a trusted and respected friend wherever he went.

== Transforming mission ==
Bosch wrote more than 150 journal articles and six books, including his magnum opus "Transforming Mission: Paradigm Shifts in Theology of Mission" (1991), which was jointly published by the American Society of Missiology and the Catholic Foreign Mission Society of America's Orbis Books.

The book was praised as groundbreaking by Hans Küng who called it the first book on mission to implement paradigm theory. Lesslie Newbigin nominated it a new standard calling it "a kind of Summa Missiologica" in reference to Thomas Aquinas' foundational thirteenth-century work Summa Theologiae. It was selected as one of the "Fifteen Outstanding Books of 1991" by the International Bulletin of Missionary Research and is available in at least 13 languages.

The book surveys paradigms of mission both in the New Testament (reflecting Bosch's careful use of New Testament criticism to trace how mission dynamics shaped scriptural forms and transformations) and through Church history (highlighting that mission has always been shaped for good or ill by its context). He then explores in detail what he sees as an emerging post-modern or ecumenical missionary paradigm.

== Death ==
Bosch died in a motor accident in 1992, aged 62.

== Family life ==
Bosch was married to Annemie Bosch. She was a significant influence on his life and work, and he often acknowledged her contributions to his writing and teaching. She supported him in his work and helped to create an environment in which he could thrive as a scholar and teacher. She also played an important role in his personal life and was a source of strength and encouragement to him. She continued to be involved in promoting his legacy and the study of missiology.

He had seven children: Fritz Bosch, Dawie Bosch, Annelise Coetzee, Anton Bosch, Gregory Bosch, Pieter Bosch and Jacques Bosch.

== Quotes ==
Mission is, quite simply, the participation of Christians in the liberating mission of Jesus, wagering on a future that verifiable experience seems to belie. It is the good news of God's love, incarnated in the witness of a community, for the sake of the world.

Our mission has not life of its own: only in the hands of the sending God can it truly be called mission. Not least since the missionary initiative comes from God alone.

Protestants, in particular, are challenged...with respect to their overly pragmatic mission structures, their tendency to portray mission almost exclusively in verbalist categories, and the absence of missionary spirituality in their churches, which often drastically impoverishes all their commendable efforts in the area of social justice.

== Works ==
- Witness To The World: The Christian Mission in Theological Perspective. Wipf and Stock Publishers. 2006. ISBN 978-1-59752-979-2.
- Transforming Mission: Paradigm Shifts in Theology of Mission. Orbis Books. 1991. ISBN 978-1-60833-146-8.
- Believing in the Future: Toward a Missiology of Western Culture. Gracewing Publishing. 1995. ISBN 978-0-85244-333-0. (published by his wife after his death)
- A Spirituality of the Road. Wipf and Stock Publishers. 2001. ISBN 978-1-57910-795-6.
- Jesus, die lydende Messias, en ons sendingmotief [Jesus, the Suffering Messiah, and our Missionary Motive] (in Afrikaans). Translated by Livingston, Kevin. N.G. Sendingpers. 1961.

== See also ==
- Missio Dei

== Sources ==
- Bevans, Stephen B.; Schroeder, Roger P.; Luzbetak, Louis J. (2005). "Missiology after Bosch: Reverencing a Classic by Moving Beyond". International Bulletin of Missionary Research. 29 (2): 69–72. doi:10.1177/239693930502900202. S2CID 147522841.
- Kritzinger, J; Saayman, W. A. (1990). "Mission in Creative Tension : A Dialogue with David Bosch". S.A. Missiological Society. Pretoria.
- Livingston, John Kevin. A Missiology of the Road : The Theology of Mission and Evangelism in the Writings of David J. Bosch. 1992.
- Livingston, John Kevin (January 1999). "Bosch, David Jacobus". International Bulletin of Missionary Research. 23 (1): 26-32. doi:10.1177/239693939902300107. S2CID 149092847.
- Saayman Willem, A. Mission in Bold Humility : David Bosch's Work Considered. Maryknoll N.Y.: Orbis Books, 1996.
