= Inculturation =

Adaptation of Christianity to cultures

In Christianity, inculturation is the adaptation of Christian teachings and practices to cultures. This is a term that is generally used by Catholics and the Orthodox, whereas Protestants (such as Anglicans and Lutherans), especially associated with the World Council of Churches, prefer to use the term "contextual theology".

== Background ==
The coexistence of Christianity and other cultures dates back to the apostolic age. Before his Ascension, Jesus instructed his disciples to spread his teachings to the ends of the earth (Mt 28,18; Mk 16,15), Saint Paul's speech to the Greeks at the Areopagus of Athens (Acts 17:22-33) could be considered as the first inculturation attempt. The speech was not well received by all, according to verse 32: "Now when they heard of the resurrection of the dead, some mocked". Around the year 50, the apostles convened the first Church council, the Council of Jerusalem, to decide whether to include Gentiles and inculturate Gentile culture. The Council confirmed that Gentiles could be accepted as Christians without first converting to Judaism.

Cultural conflicts continued until Christianity incorporated the Greco-Roman culture. Similar inculturation occurred when the Roman Empire ceased and the Germanic and Medieval cultures became dominant, a process taking centuries. Early practitioners of inculturation in the history of missions include St. Patrick in Ireland and Sts. Cyril and Methodius for the Slavic peoples of Eastern Europe. After the schism of 1054, the Catholic Church was largely restricted to the Western parts of Europe. Attempts failed to return the sphere of influence to the cultures of the Middle East with the crusades and the Latin Empire in Constantinople (1204–1261). The Protestant Reformation generated a division in the Western Church. However, at the same time, Spanish and Portuguese discoveries of the Americas, Asia and Africa broadened contact with other cultures and civilizations.

== Inculturation after the discoveries ==
After the discoveries of new territories and the Council of Trent (1545–1563), the inculturation movement became more systematic and was particularly associated with the Jesuits. The Catholic Church had to ponder how and to evaluate elements of ancient non-Christian cultures. Notable figures were, among others, the Jesuits José de Anchieta for the indigenous people of Brazil, Thomas Stephens in Goa, Roberto de Nobili in Southern India, and Alexandre de Rhodes in Vietnam.

=== China ===
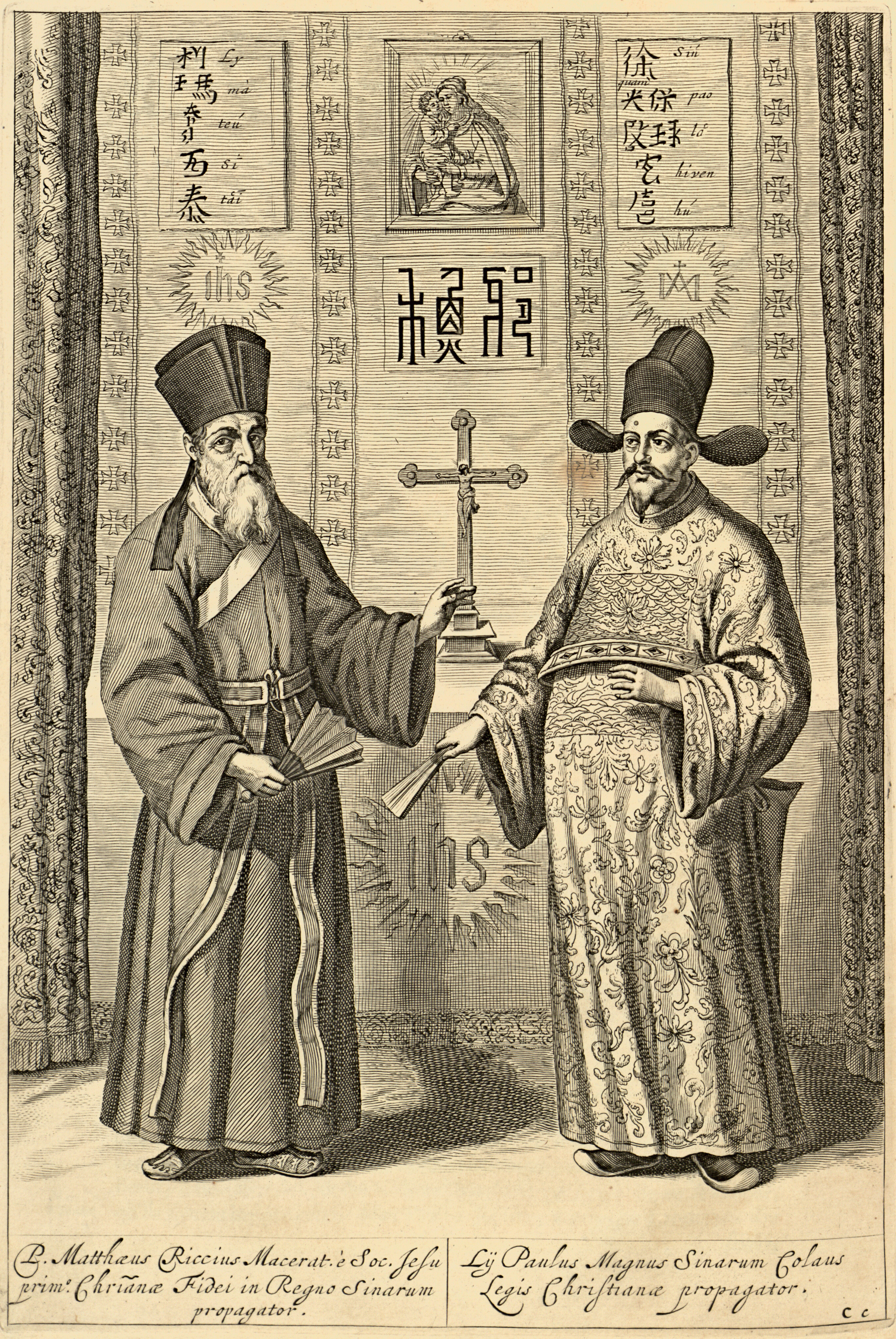
Matteo Ricci (left) and Xu Guangqi (right) in the Chinese edition of Euclid's Elements, published in 1607

The Jesuits Matteo Ricci (from Portugal), Adam Schall von Bell and others were missionaries appointed to introduce Christianity to China. They learned Chinese and more about the culture, seeking to find ways to help the people understand elements of the Gospel. Ricci and Schall were appointed by the Chinese Emperor in Peking to be court mathematicians, court astronomers and Mandarins. The first Catholic Church was built in Peking in 1650. The emperor granted freedom of religion to Catholics.

Ricci had adapted the Catholic faith to Chinese thinking, permitting, among other things, the cultic veneration of ancestors, which he described as cultural practice. The Holy See disagreed, deeming the veneration an act of worship and hence idolatry. It forbade any adaptation of Christianity in the so-called Chinese Rites controversy in 1692 and 1742. The Chinese emperor felt duped and refused to permit any alteration of existing Christian practices. The Church suffered setbacks in 1721 when the Kangxi Emperor outlawed Christian missions. According to Franzen, "The Vatican policy was the death of the missions in China."

== Papal teachings ==
=== Leo XIII ===
In the late nineteenth century, Pope Leo XIII fostered inter-cultural diversity, leading to the reintegration of the Armenian Catholic Church into the Catholic Church in 1879. He opposed efforts to Latinize the Eastern Rite Churches, saying that they constitute a most valuable ancient tradition and symbol of the divine unity of the Catholic Church. His 1894 encyclical Praeclara gratulationis praised the cultural and liturgical diversity of expressions of faith within the Church. In Orientalium Dignitas he repeated the need to preserve and cultivate diversity and declared different cultures to be a treasure. He opposed the latinization policies of the Vatican and decreed a number of measures that preserved the integrity and distinctiveness of other cultural expressions.

=== Benedict XV and Pius XI ===
While Pope Pius IX and Pope Pius X tended to be slightly more Latin oriented, Benedict XV was especially concerned with the development of missionary activities, which had suffered so much during World War I. He believed that inculturation was based on development of a domestic clergy in lands where Christianity was new. On November 20, 1919, he appealed to the Catholics of the world, to support missions and especially the development of local clergy, favouring a de-Europeanization of the Catholic missions. Pope Pius XI promoted local clergy in order to better recognize local cultures. He held a mission congress in Rome in 1922. Each year he personally consecrated newly appointed bishops from Asia, Africa and Latin America. At his death 240 dioceses and administrations were led by bishops who were natives of the countries where they served.

=== Pius XII ===
In 1939 Pope Pius XII, within weeks of his coronation, radically reverted the 250-year-old Vatican policy and permitted the veneration of dead family members in China. The December 8, 1939 issuance from the Sacred Congregation for the Propagation of the Faith, issued at the request of Pius XII, stated that Chinese customs were no longer considered superstitious but rather an honourable way of esteeming one's relatives, and therefore permitted to Catholics. The Church established twenty new arch-dioceses, seventy-nine dioceses, and thirty-eight apostolic prefect over the next decade. But in 1949, the Communist revolution took over the country and repressed Christianity.

The introduction of the Gospel means inculturation and not the destruction of local cultures. Pius emphasized this; he wrote in Summi Pontificatus that a deeper appreciation of various civilizations and their good qualities is necessary to the preaching of the Gospel of Christ. And in his 1944 speech to the directors of the Pontifical Missionary Society, he said:

"The herald of the Gospel and messenger of Christ is an apostle. His office does not demand that he transplant European civilization and culture, and no other, to foreign soil, there to take root and propagate itself. His task in dealing with these peoples, who sometimes boast of a very old and highly developed culture of their own, is to teach and form them so that they are ready to accept willingly and in a practical manner the principles of Christian life and morality; principles, I might add, that fit into any culture, provided it be good and sound, and which give that culture greater force in safeguarding human dignity and in gaining human happiness."

Inculturation was addressed in his encyclicals Evangelii praecones and Fidei donum, issued on June 2, 1951 and April 21, 1957, respectively. Pius increased the local decision-making of Catholic missions, many of which became independent dioceses. Pius XII demanded recognition of local cultures as fully equal to European culture. Continuing the line of his predecessors, Pius XII supported the establishment of local administration in Church affairs: in 1950, the hierarchy of Western Africa became independent; in 1951, Southern Africa; and in 1953, British Eastern Africa. Finland, Burma, and French Africa became independent dioceses in 1955.

=== Paul VI ===
In the Second Vatican Council, Paul VI promulgated the decree Ad gentes, teaching that inculturation imitates the "economy of Incarnation".

=== John Paul II ===
John Paul II addressed the issue in several encyclicals and public appearances. The term was used again by the encyclical Redemptoris Missio of John Paul II in 1990.

- "The incarnation of the Gospel in native cultures and also the introduction of these cultures into the life of the Church."
- "The intimate transformation of authentic cultural values through their integration in Christianity and the insertion of Christianity in the various human cultures."
- "It is now acknowledged that inculturation is a theological term which has been defined in Redemptoris Missio 52 as the on-going dialogue between faith and culture."

=== Benedict XVI ===
Benedict XVI, like his predecessor, placed a high regard on the dialogue between cultures and religions. Though he at one point attempted to move from the notion of "inculturation" to "inter-culturality", he would later state that the inculturation of the faith is necessary, as long as the specificity and the integrity of the "culture of faith" are not compromised.

== Challenges and criticisms ==
Christian approaches of inculturation have not always been positively received by the context being inculturation. In Francis Xavier's missionary work in 16th-century Japan, Xavier asked the convert Anjiro for a Japanese word that would be the equivalent of Deus and was offered the word Dainichi (大日, lit. 'great sun'). While first accepting it, Xavier later realized Anjiro's Dainichi derived from the central divinity of Shingon Buddhism. To avoid invoking the god of a competing religion, Xavier transliterated Deus into the phonetic equivalent Deusu (デウス). But this was phonetically similar to the term dai uso (大嘘), meaning "great lie." Avoiding Xavier's difficulties, Matteo Ricci in China and Roberto de Nobili in India did not attempt the same phonetic transliteration in inculturation.

== See also ==
- Christianity and colonialism
- Christianization
- Cultural Christian
- Cultural imperialism
- Enculturation
- Missiology
- Religious pluralism and Jacques Dupuis (Jesuit)
- Syncretism
- Zaire Use
- Models of Contextual Theology

== Sources ==
- August Franzen Church history, Kirchengeschichte, Herder Freiburg, 1988
- Schineller, Peter. A Handbook on Inculturation. New York, 1990.
- Shorter, Aylward. Toward a Theology of Inculturation. Maryknoll, NY, 1988.
