= Missional living =

Christian practice

Missional living is a Christian practice to adopt the thinking, behaviors, and practices of a missionary in everyday life, in order to engage others with the gospel message.

== Background ==
Traditionally, Christians have seen mission as either a special event (e.g., a one-week series of meetings, or a conference) or as a full-time job for a few individuals (e.g., sending a missionary to a foreign country for several years to convert new people to Christianity). Missional living is seen as a way of life for all Christians at all times.

The Missional Church Movement, a church renewal movement based on the necessity of missional living by Christians, gained popularity at the end of the twentieth century, mainly due to the publication of “Missional Church” by Darrell Guder in 1998, and advocates like Tim Keller Advocates contrast missional living in ordinary life with the idea of a select group of "professional" missionaries, emphasizing that all Christians should be involved in the Great Commission of Jesus Christ.

== Terminology ==
The missional living concept is rooted in the Missio dei (Latin, "the sending of God").

In 1934, Karl Hartenstein, a German missiologist, coined the phrase in response to Karl Barth and his emphasis on actio Dei ("the action of God"), seeing God as the primary acting agent in the world and within the church.

During the International Missionary Council conferences of the 1950s and 1960s, Mission Theology began to take shape. It came to public attention in 1962, in Johannes Blauw’s book The Missionary Nature of the Church.

In 1983, Anglican Bishop, and missionary to India, Lesslie Newbigin published The Other Side of 1984, which looked at the close ties between Western Christianity and Western society and the loss of influence which the church had had upon society around it. In 1989 he wrote that according to Jesus’s statements in the Gospel of John, every Christian has been sent by Jesus with the gospel into the community to live with those in the surrounding culture for the sake of the King and His kingdom: “The Church is sent into the world to continue that which he came to do, in the power of the same Spirit, reconciling people to God.” Jesus said, “As the Father has sent Me, I am sending you” (John 20:21).

"No one can say: ‘Since I’m not called to be a missionary, I do not have to evangelize my friends and neighbors.’ There is no difference, in spiritual terms, between a missionary witnessing in his hometown and a missionary witnessing in Katmandu, Nepal. We are all called to go - even if it is only to the next room, or the next block.”"

== Belief ==
=== Theory ===
Missional living is the embodiment of the mission of Jesus in the world by visibly living out the gospel.

There is no definitive definition of ‘Missional Living’ and many Christians interpret it in different ways. Guder notes that this happens when “we experience the transforming truth of Christ and bring it to everything we do.”. The Reformed Theological Seminary in the US sees it as “live as a saint, one of the Lord … to live as a sent one, to think as a sent one, to write as a sent one for the sake of God’s glory, the edification of God’s people the church, and the salvation of the lost, across the street and around the world.” The Missional Challenge workshop sees it as “embodying the mission and message of Jesus and seeking to be Jesus to everyone everywhere.”.

The Missional Challenge workshop also notes that for any Christian, Mission Living covers many areas of life including, to seize Christ’s mission as a personal goal, to commit to proclaim the gospel to a specific geographical area, to influence non-believers towards Christ and to motivate other Christians.

== Distinctive Reasons for Missional Living ==
One author has written, "It is imperative that Christians be like Jesus, by living freely within the culture as missionaries who are as faithful to the Father and his gospel as Jesus was in his own time and place.". This embodiment of the gospel is often referred to as "contextualization" or "inculturation."

"Both refer to more than a simple translation of the gospel into different languages and cultures in the way that one translates a history book or a science text. Rather, they point to the embodiment of the living Word in human culture and social settings in such a way that its divine nature and power are not lost. True contextualization is more than communication. It is God working in the hearts of people, making them new and forming them into a new community. It is his Word transforming their lives, their societies, their cultures."

These five biblical distinctives form the foundation of a missional perspective:

1. The Church is sent by Jesus Christ (John 17:18; 20:21, Luke 9:2; Matthew 28:19–20; Acts 1:8)
2. The Church is sent with the Cross (1 Cor 1:18, Eph 2:16, Col 2:14, 1 Pet 2:24, 2 Cor 5:17–24)
3. The Church is sent in Community (Acts 2:42–47; 5:42; John 13:34–35; 1 John 3:16–17)
4. The Church is sent to every Culture (John 1:14; Matthew 20:28; Acts 17:22–34; Luke 5:29)
5. The Church is sent for the King and His Kingdom (Matthew 10:7; 25:34; Luke 4:43; Rev 11:15–17; Jeremiah 10:7; John 18:36)

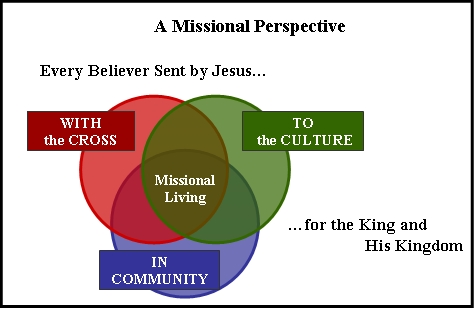

"Jesus was the first apostle. He was sent by his Father. He, in turn, sent the Twelve. They went to people who would then take the gospel to the rest of the world. Whoever received it would understand that they, too, had been sent. With the gospel being what it is, the church as bearer of the gospel is bound to be apostolic."

=== Gospel ===
Jesus Christ said that He came to earth to seek and to save that which was lost (Luke 19:10). According to Scripture, without of Jesus’ death on the cross, and the resurrection, there is no salvation, no forgiveness, and no hope; because of the cross, there is eternal life. “For the word of the cross is to those who are perishing foolishness, but to us who are being saved it is the power of God” (1 Cor 1:18).

The Kingdom of God was central to Jesus’ message and mission. The Book of Acts ends with St Paul, under house arrest in Rome, “proclaiming the kingdom of God and teaching about the Lord Jesus Christ with all boldness and without hindrance” (Acts 28:31). Christians are sent to proclaim the gospel of the kingdom so that others may enter the kingdom. George Hunsberger conveys the idea that the Church is pointing beyond itself to the kingdom of God. The Church is not an end in itself; God has a mission that goes beyond the Church which includes the kingdom. The kingdom and the Church must never be divorced, yet they also must never be equated. In a similar way, “the reign must never be separated from the One who reigns.”. The kingdom is always at the heart of the King.

=== Community ===
George Peters notes, “If man is to be reached, he must be reached within his own culture.” This principle is observed when God became a man in the form of Jesus to come to earth and incarnate the gospel. As missionaries sent by Jesus, every Christian must learn to interpret their surrounding culture, uncovering the language, values, and ideas of the culture. Missional Christians use this information to reach people with the gospel message in the context, building their own Christian community in the process and bringing the gospel together to the culture.

== Missional Church Movement ==
The Missional Church Movement first arose during the end of the 20th century and the beginning of the 21st century. The movement seeks to rethink and redefine the nature of the church and create a new paradigm in which churches are seen as missional in nature, instead of attractional in nature. Leaders in the movement argue that instead of churches attempting to attract people to churches through church programs, churches should instead take the gospel outside of the church and engage society with the gospel, often by being involved not only in missions and evangelism but also in social justice movements. The missional church defines itself in terms of its mission - being sent ones who take the gospel to and incarnate the gospel, which is to announce to the world Jesus is its lord within a specific cultural context.

"Mission is not just a program of the church. It defines the church as God’s sent people. Either we are defined by mission, or we reduce the scope of the gospel and the mandate of the church. Thus our challenge today is to move from church with mission to missional church."

The mission of the Church is to spread the gospel.

"Missional church is a community of God’s people that defines itself, and organizes its life around, its real purpose of being an agent of God’s mission to the world. In other words, the church’s true and authentic organizing principle is mission. When the church is in mission, it is the true church. The church itself is not only a product of that mission but is obligated and destined to extend it by whatever means possible. The mission of God flows directly through every believer and every community of faith that adheres to Jesus. To obstruct this is to block God’s purposes in and through his people."

Missional living is a term that is used in contrast with historical institutional churches. Church leaders as well as Christians in general have often regarded the Church as an institution, to which outsiders must come in order to receive a certain product, namely, the gospel and all its associated benefits. Institutional churches are sometimes perceived to exist for the members and depend on pastors and staff to evangelize the lost. The "missional church", on the other hand, attempts to take Christ to "the lost". Members of the missional church are personally engaged in reaching their communities with the message of Jesus Christ.

== See also ==
- Inculturation
- Missio dei
- Anchor Gaslamp
- Missional community
- Mosaic Church
- Dan Kimball
- Emerging church
- Erwin McManus
- Mark Driscoll
- Brian McLaren
- Don Miller (author)
- Derek Webb
