= Alternative worship =

Alternative worship is "what happens when people create worship for themselves," according to Steve Collins. As a phenomenon it began mainly in Europe, Australia and New Zealand in the late 1980s and early 1990s. It is practiced by Christians across the age-range, although has a particular following amongst adults in their 20s and 30s.

Alternative Worship usually refers to an approach to Christian worship and worship planning that emphasizes decentralized leadership, congregational participation, multi-sensory experience, ritual and narrative form. It is often discussed in contrast to Contemporary worship or "Youth" services. In fact it is (arguably) in part a reaction against, or a development beyond evangelical or charismatic forms of worship. It tends to use popular (secular) music forms in place of Christian worship songs, and more casual talks in place of the traditional sermon. Alternative Worship often does not have an obvious leader or stage, and may not involve singing or lecture-style presentations at all.

Alternative worship services often feature elements from ancient Christian spirituality and liturgy, such as a labyrinth, a kyrie, candle lighting and the sacraments in combination with very new elements, like projected images or video and/or electronic music.

Terms that are more appropriate to the approach used in these services would be Holistic Worship, Multisensory worship or Creative Worship.

Alternative worship is often associated with the Emerging Church.
