= Practical theology =

Academic discipline that examines and reflects on religious practices

Practical theology is an academic discipline that examines and reflects on religious practices in order to understand the theology enacted in those practices and in order to consider how theological theory and theological practices can be more fully aligned, changed, or improved. Practical theology has often sought to address a perceived disconnection between dogmatics or theology as an academic discipline on the one hand, and the life and practice of the church on the other.

As articulated by Richard Osmer, the four key tasks or questions to be asked by practical theology are:

1. What is going on? (the descriptive-empirical task)
2. Why is this going on? (the interpretative task)
3. What ought to be going on? (the normative task)
4. How might we respond? (the pragmatic task)

== Definition ==
Gerben Heitink defines practical theology as “the empirically oriented theological theory of the mediation of the Christian faith in the praxis of modern society.” Practical theology consists of several related sub-fields: applied theology (such as missions, evangelism, religious education, pastoral psychology or the psychology of religion), church growth, administration, homiletics, spiritual formation, pastoral theology, spiritual direction, spiritual theology (or ascetical theology), political theology, theology of justice and peace and similar areas.

Ray Anderson writes that the first person to give practical theology a definition, C.I. Nitzch, defined it as the “theory of the church’s practice of Christianity.” Anderson quotes John Swinton as defining practical theology as “critical reflection on the actions of the church in light of the gospel and Christian Tradition.” Swinton cites Don Browning's definition of practical theology as “the reflective process which the church pursues in its efforts to articulate the theological grounds of practical living in a variety of areas such as work, sexuality, marriage, youth, aging, and death.”

== History ==
Practical theology was first introduced by Friedrich Schleiermacher in the early 1800s as an academic discipline encompassing the practice of Church leadership in his Brief Outline of the Study of Theology. Schleiermacher viewed practical theology as one of three theological sciences, along with philosophical theology and historical theology, together making theology whole.

Theologian Elaine Graham posits that practical theology has evolved over time. Originally focused more towards church leaders, she argues that it has become more personal and autobiographical.

== Application ==
Other fields of theology have been influenced by practical theology and benefit from its usage, including applied theology (mission, evangelism, religious education, pastoral psychology or the psychology of religion), church growth, administration, homiletics, spiritual formation, pastoral theology, spiritual direction, spiritual theology (or ascetical theology), political theology, theology of justice and peace and similar areas.

Practical theology also includes advocacy theology, such as the various theologies of liberation (of the oppressed in general, of the disenfranchised, of women, of immigrants, of children, black theology and tribal theology). A theology of relational care has also been proposed as an approach to practical theology. This approach focuses on ministering to the personal needs of others, primarily individuals going through crises of a temporal nature. This may include individuals and families experiencing poverty, ill health, stigmatization, or ostracization from mainstream society. Such ministry might be facilitated in a church or a parachurch environment.

"Convergent practical theology" has emerged from the combined studies and practice of missiology with organizational development since the publication of Missional Church: A Vision for the Sending of the Church in North America.

== See also ==
- Duncan B. Forrester
- Darrell Guder
- Practical charismatic theology
- Friedrich Schleiermacher
