= Contextual theology =

Theology's response to culture

Contextual theology or contextualizing theology refers to theology which has responded to the dynamics of a particular context.

== Terminology ==
The term contextualizing theology was used in missiology by Shoki Coe when he argued that the Venn-Anderson three-self formula was inadequate in addressing the sociopolitical context of his native Taiwan. Coe popularized this notion through the Theological Education Fund of the World Council of Churches. While it was initially understood as part of a liberal approach to theology, it has grown in currency among evangelicals and Roman Catholics.

An individual may come from a particular cultural worldview, such as Arabic or Asian culture, or be faced with particular sociopolitical issues. Hence, examples of contextualized theologies include Latin American liberation theology, Minjung theology, and African theology.

The systematic theologian Regunta Yesurathnam sees contextual theology as including "all that is implied in indigenization or inculturation, but also seeks to include the realities of contemporaneity, secularity, technology, and the struggle for human justice." The missiologist Stephen B. Bevans argues that there is no such thing as normative theology, that "doing theology contextually is not an option" since it is a human enterprise which is created within a particular human context.

According to Bevans, contextualization is a better term than indigenization to describe social location and particular experience because it "broadens the understanding of culture to include social, political, and economic questions," while indigenization merely focuses on the "purely cultural dimension of human experience." Secondly, Bevans comments that indigenization tends to "see both the home culture and the culture 'out there' as good," while contextualization is usually "more critical of both cultures." Thirdly, the term contextualization suggests that "theology needs to interact and dialogue not only with traditional culture value, but with social change, new ethnic identities, and the conflicts that are present as the contemporary phenomenon of globalization encounters the various peoples of the world."

== Biblical studies ==
In the field of Bible translation and interpretation, contextualization is the process of assigning meaning as a means of interpreting the environment within which a text or action is executed.

Contextualization is used in the study of Bible translations in relation to their relevant cultural settings. Derived from the practice of hermeneutics, it sought to understand the use of words borrowed into the Hebrew Scriptures, and later their Greek and Latin translations.

The word continues to be used theologically, mainly in the sense of contextualizing the biblical message as perceived in the missionary mandate originated by Jesus in the gospel accounts. However, since the early 1970s, the word's meaning has widened. It is now used by secular, religious and political groups to render their message into different settings by adjusting or accommodating words, phrases or meanings into understandable contexts in respondent cultures.

== See also ==
- Bible version debate
- Contextualization (sociolinguistics)
- Inculturation
- Missional living
- Models of Contextual Theology
