= Models of Contextual Theology =

Book by Stephen B. Bevans

- Author: Stephen B. Bevans
- Language: English
- Publisher: Orbis Books
- Publication date: 1992; 2002 (rev. and exp. ed.)
- Publication place: United States

Models of Contextual Theology is a book written by Stephen B. Bevans which argues that all Christian theology is contextual and identifies six dominant models of contextual theology.

== History ==
Bevans first sketched out his ideas of various models of contextualization through his time as a missionary in the Philippines and when he was teaching at Catholic Theological Union.

These ideas were expanded into Models, first published in 1992, which included five models: translation, anthropological, praxis, synthetic, and transcendental. The book was revised in 2002 to include a sixth model, the countercultural model.

== Models ==
=== Praxis model ===
The praxis model is a way of doing theology that is formed by knowledge at its most intense level. It is also about discerning the meaning and contributing to the course of social change, and so it takes its inspiration from neither classic texts nor classic behavior but from present realities and future possibilities. The praxis model gives ample room for expressions of personal and communal experience. At the same time it provides exciting new understandings of the scriptural and older theological witness.

The term praxis is used as an alternative to the terms "practice" or "action" in both theological and the social science disciplines. "Praxis" is a term not unfamiliar to Christian thought, where Orthopraxy is a term derived from Greek ὀρθοπραξία (orthopraxia) meaning "correct action/activity" or an emphasis on conduct, both ethical and liturgical, as opposed to faith or grace etc. This contrasts with orthodoxy, which emphasizes correct belief, and ritualism, the use of rituals. The term is frequently used by liberation theology proponents, such as Gustavo Gutierrez, who emphasize "praxis" over doctrine. Gutierrez later clarified his position by advocating a circular relationship between orthodoxy and orthopraxis seeing the two as having a symbiotic relationship. Gutierrez' reading of the Biblical prophets condemning oppression and injustice against the poor (i.e. Jeremiah 22:13–17) informs his assertion that to know God (orthodoxy) is to do justice (orthopraxis). Cardinal Ratzinger (the future Pope Benedict XVI), however, criticized liberation theology for elevating orthopraxis to the level of orthodoxy. Richard McBrien summarizes this concept as follows:

God is disclosed in the historical ‘’praxis’’ of liberation. It is the situation, and our passionate and reflective involvement in it, which mediates the Word of God. Today that Word is mediated through the cries of the poor and the oppressed.

In the social sciences, praxis is understood as a technical term with roots in Marxism, and in the educational philosophy of Paulo Freire.

=== Transcendental model ===
The transcendental model proposes that constructing a contextualized theology is not about producing a particular body of texts, but is instead about attending to the affective and cognitive operations in the self-transcending subject. In other words, "theology happens as a person struggles more adequately and authentically to articulate and appropriate this ongoing relationship with the divine." The emphasis here is on theology as an activity and process as opposed to a particular context. This model is not about finding right answers that exist in some transcultural realm, but rather revolves around a passionate search for authentic expression of one's religious and cultural identity.

The term transcendental echoes the "transcendental method" created by Immanuel Kant in the eighteenth century and developed in the twentieth century by thinkers like Pierre Rousselot, Joseph Marechal, Karl Rahner, and Bernard Lonergan, all attempting to understand a genuine "intellectualism" they found in Thomas Aquinas with regard to modern subjectivity and historical consciousness.

=== Countercultural model ===
The countercultural model aims to be engaging and relevant to the context while at the same time remaining faithful to the gospel. This model recognizes the deep ambiguity and even antigospel character of context. In regard to so much of western culture, it seems that Christianity today must speak a word of radical dissent and offer an alternate way of living.

However, this model have four areas of caution. First, the danger that this model to be anticultural. Second, the danger of sectarianism is always present in this model. Third, countercultural model is in regard to its relatively monocultural makeup. Finally, the danger of Christian exclusivism over against other religious ways.
