= Darrell Guder =

American Christian theologian and missiologist

Darrell Likens Guder is a Christian theologian, missiologist, and professor emeritus of missional and ecumenical theology at Princeton Theological Seminary.

== Biography ==
Guder received his PhD from the University of Hamburg. As an ordained Presbyterian minister, he served as a student outreach pastor and as a faculty member of the Karlshohe College in the German Lutheran Church.

His writing and teaching focus on the theology of the missional church, especially the theological implications of the paradigm shift to post-Christendom as the context for Christian mission in the West. Previously, he taught at Princeton Theological Seminary as Henry Winters Luce Professor of Missional and Ecumenical Theology from 2002 to 2015 and as Dean of Academic Affairs from 2005 to 2010. Since his retirement, he has been a professor emeritus of missional and ecumenical theology. Guder is also Senior Fellow in Residence at the Centre for Missional Leadership at St. Andrew's Hall at the University of British Columbia.

He has served as secretary-treasurer of the American Society of Missiology (ASM) and was president of the ASM from 2007 to 2008. His scholarly translations include Otto Weber, Foundations of Dogmatics (2 vols.); Eberhard Jüngel, God as the Mystery of the World; Karl Barth, The Theology of the Reformed Confessions (with Judith Guder; Eberhard Busch), and The Great Passion: An Introduction to the Theology of Karl Barth (with Judith Guder).

== Publications ==
=== Books ===
- Called to Witness: Doing Missional Theology (Wm. B. Eerdmans Publishing Company, 2015)
- The Great Passion: An Introduction to Karl Barth's Theology (Wm. B. Eerdmans Publishing Company, 2010)
- God as the Mystery of the World: On the Foundation of the Theology of the Crucified One in the Dispute Between Theism and Atheism (Wipf & Stock Publishers, 2009)
- Mission i et pluralisk samfund—hvorfor og hvordan? (Folkekirkens Mission, 2007)
- Exhibition of the Kingdom of Heaven to the World (Witherspoon Press, 2007)
- The Incarnation and the Church's Witness (Wipf & Stock Publishers, 2005)
- The Continuing Conversion of the Church: Evangelization as the Heart of Ministry (Wm. B. Eerdmans Publishing Company, 2000)
- Missional Church: A Vision for the Sending of the Church in North America, editor. (Wm. B. Eerdmans Publishing Company, 1998)
- Be My Witnesses: The Church’s Mission, Message, and Messengers (Wm. B. Eerdmans Publishing Company, 1985)

=== Selected articles ===
- "Missio Dei: Integrating Theological Formation for Apostolic Vocation." Missiology 37, 1 (January 2009): 63–74.
- "Worthy Living: Work and Witness from the Perspective of Missional Church Theology." Word & World 25, 4 (Fall 2005): 424–432.
- "Global Mission and the Challenge of Theological Catholicity." Theology Today 62, 1 (April 2005): 1–7.
- "Pentecost and Missionary Preaching in North America." Journal for Preachers 25, 4 (Pentecost 2002): 19–25.
- "Evangelism and Justice: From False Dichotomies to Gospel Faithfulness." Church & Society 92, 2 (November–December 2001): 14–20.

=== Selected chapters ===
- "Theological Significance of the Lord's Day for the Formation of the Missional Church." In Sunday, Sabbath, and the Weekend: Managing Time in a Global Culture, eds. Edward O'Flaherty and Rodney L. Petersen, with Timothy A. Norton. Grand Rapids: Eerdmans, 2010.
- "The Christological Formation of Missional Practice." In Jesus Christ Today: Studies of Christology in Various Contexts, ed. Stuart George Hall. New York: W. de Gruyter, 2009.
- "Practical Theology in the Service of the Missional Church." In Theology in Service of the Church: Essays in Honor of Joseph D. Small 3rd. Louisville: Geneva Press, 2008.
- "Incarnation and the Church's Evangelistic Mission." In The Study of Evangelism: Exploring a Missional Practice of the Church, eds. Paul W. Chilcote and Laceye C. Warner. Grand Rapids: Eerdmans, 2008.
