= Pastoral theology =

Branch of catholic theology

Pastoral theology is the branch of practical theology concerned with the application of the study of religion in the context of regular church ministry. This approach to theology seeks to give practical expression to theology. Normally viewed as an 'equipping' of ministers, practical theology is often considered to be more pragmatic than speculative, indeed, essentially a practical science. Hence its main interests are in those areas of theology which will aid clergy in ministry. Topics tend to include homiletics, pastoral care, sacramental theology, and ethics.

All branches of theology, whether theoretical or practical, purpose in one way or another to make priests, pastors, and others in a pastoral role "the ministers of Christ, and the dispensers of the mysteries of God" (1 Corinthians 4:1). Pastoral theology presupposes other various branches, accepts the apologetic, dogmatic, exegetic, moral, juridical, ascetical, liturgical, and other conclusions reached by the ecclesiastical student, and scientifically applies these various conclusions to the priestly ministry.

== History ==
During the Middle Ages, there was not yet a separated and systematized science of pastoral theology. Scholasticism did not recognize this science apart from other branches of theology. Dogma and morals were so taught as to include the application of their conclusions to the care of souls. Still, even then writings of the great Doctors of the Church were at times purely pastoral; such was the "Pastoral Care" of Pope Gregory I; "Opuscula", 17–20, of Thomas Aquinas; Bonaventure's "De sex alis seraphim", "De regimine animæ", "Confessionale"; the "Summa theologica" (Books II, III), together with the "Summa confessionalis" of Antoninus, Bishop of Florence. At the same time, writers on mystical theology have often entered into the domain of pastoral theology.

Not until the period of the Counter-Reformation did the science of pastoral theology take its present systematized form. During the latter half of the fifteenth century, in certain places, pastoral duties were very much neglected. By the dawn of the sixteenth century, the care of souls was to many priests and not a few bishops a lost or a never-acquired art, with the result that the laity were ready to throw off what was deemed to be a useless clerical yoke. The Council of Trent set itself to bring about a true reformation of the priesthood. Catholic bishops and theologians followed the lead of the council. The result was the treatment of the care of souls as a science by itself.
