= Alan Hirsch =

Australian author and missionologist

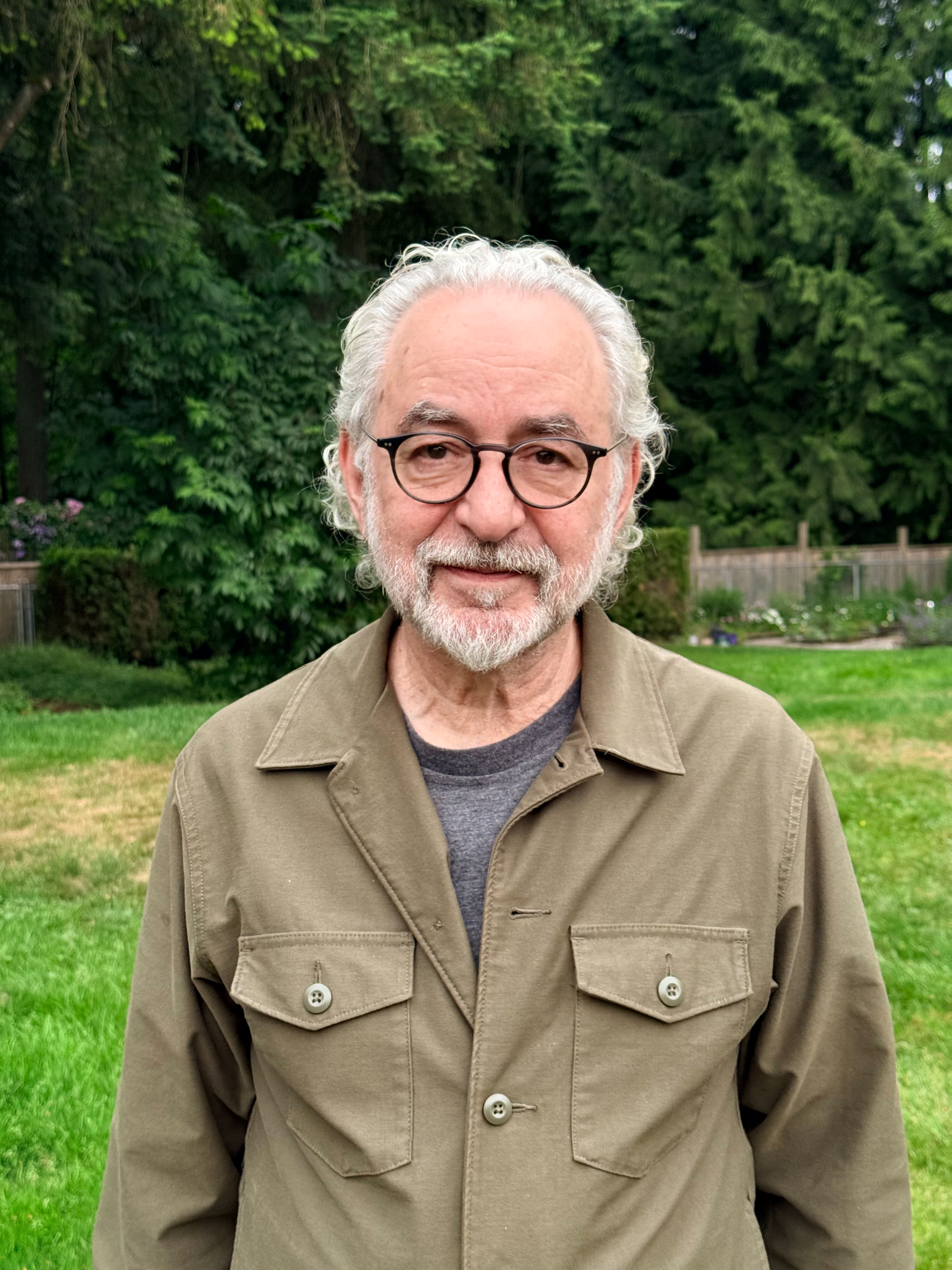
Alan Hirsch in 2026

Alan Hirsch (born 24 October 1959) is a South African-Australian author and academic who is active in the missional church movement.

== Biography ==
Hirsch was born into a Jewish family in Johannesburg, South Africa, in 1959. He moved to Cape Town in 1963, where he spent most of his childhood and adolescence. Then, he went to university in Cape Town, where he studied business and marketing. He served a two-year compulsory call-up in the South African military.

Hirsch moved to Australia in 1983 with his family. In Australia, he had a life-changing experience with the Holy Spirit that deeply affected him.. Although his family was not particularly religious, he was very much influenced by his Jewish heritage. He emphasizes Jesus as the Jewish Messiah and makes distinctions between Hebraic and Hellenistic thought.

Hirsch is the author of numerous books. He is the founding director of the Forge Mission Training Network and an adjunct professor at Asbury Seminary, Fuller Theological Seminary, and George Fox Seminary. He co-founded the Masters of Arts program in Missional Church Movements at Wheaton College in the United States.

== Personal life ==
Soon after moving to Australia, he married his wife, Debra, in Australia. They have been in Christian ministry together for over 35 years.

== Select publications ==
- ReJesus: A Wild Messiah for a Missional Church with Michael Frost. Hendrickson Publishing, 2009. ISBN 978-1598562286.
- The Forgotten Ways: Reactivating the Missional Church. Brazos Press, 2009. ISBN 978-1587431647.
- Untamed: Reactivating a Missional Form of Discipleship. with Debra Hirsch. Baker Books, 2010. ISBN 978-0801013430.
- Right Here, Right Now: Everyday Mission For Everyday People. Baker Books, 2011. ISBN 978-0801072239.
- On the Verge: A Journey into the Apostolic Future of the Church. with Dave Ferguson. Zondervan, 2011. ISBN 978-0310331001.
- The Permanent Revolution: Apostolic Imagination and Practice for the 21st Century Church. with Tim Catchim. Jossey-Bass, 2012. ISBN 978-0470907740.
- The Shaping of Things to Come: Innovation and Mission for the 21st Century. with Michael Frost. Baker Books, 2013. ISBN 978-0801014918.
- 5Q: Reactivating the Original Intelligence and Capacity of the Body of Christ. 100 Movements, 2017. ISBN 978-0998639307.
- ReFramation: Seeing God, People, and Mission through Re-enchanted Frames. with Mark Nelson. 100 Movement Publishing, 2019. ISBN 978-0998639338.
- The Starfish and the Spirit: Unleashing the Leadership Potential of Churches and Organizations. with Lance Ford and Rob Wegner. Zondervan, 2021. ISBN 978-0310098379.
- Metanoia: How God Radically Transforms People, Churches, and Organizations From the Inside Out. with Rob Kelly. 100 Movements Publishing, 2023. ISBN 978-1955142373.
- Disciplism: Reimagining Evangelism Through the Lens of Discipleship. 100 Movements Publishing, 2024. ASIN B0D3L15M82.
- The Faith of Leap: Embracing a Theology of Risk, Adventure, and Courage (Revised Edition). 100 Movements Publishing, 2025. ISBN 978-1955142632.

== See also ==
- Missional community
