= Missiology =

Academic study of Christian mission history and methodology

Missiology is the academic study of the Christian mission history and methodology. It began to be developed as an academic discipline in the 19th century.

== Definition ==
Broadly speaking, missiology is "an interdisciplinary field of inquiry into Christian mission or missions that utilizes theological, historical, and various social scientific methods." It has historically focused on the missionary and evangelistic work of Protestant and Catholic denominations from Europe and North America into other continents. But the decline in Christian numbers in the West has been met by the rise of Evangelical and Pentecostal Christians in the Majority World "for which mission and evangelism are their raison d'être."

Through missionary work in new contexts and the gradual shift in the World Christian population from the West to the non-Western world, Christians have had to grapple with new questions. While biblical and theologically rooted, missiology has therefore sought a deep engagement in the social sciences, in disciplines such as anthropology, history, geography, communication theory, comparative religious studies, social studies, education, psychology, and inter-religious relations. Missiology has thus included topics like inculturation, contextualization, interfaith relations, and reverse mission.

== History ==
Missiology as an academic discipline appeared only in the 19th century. It was the Scottish missionary Alexander Duff who first developed a systematic theory of mission and was appointed in 1867 to the first chair in missiology in the world, the new chair of Evangelistic Theology in New College, Edinburgh. The chair was short-lived and closed after Duff's departure.

Gustav Warneck is often recognized as the founder of Protestant missiology as a discipline. He founded the first scientific missionary periodical in 1874, Allgemeine Missions-Zeitschrift, and was appointed the chair of missionary science at the University of Halle in Germany in 1897. His three-volume work on Protestant mission theory Evangelische Missionlehre and his survey of the history of Protestant missionary work were extremely important for the young discipline.

Influenced by Warneck's work, Catholic church historian Joseph Schmidlin began lecturing in missiology in 1910 at the University of Munster and was appointed to the first chair of Catholic missiology at the same university in 1914.

Since the 1950s, missiology has generally been discussed within the theological framework of the missio Dei, the "Mission of God." This has shifted the discussion away from "missions" in the plural, an exclusive focus on the evangelizing of the non-Christian in overseas contexts, to "mission" in the singular, a broader topic including a multiplicity of God's activities in the world. Hence, "Mission is the participation of the people of God in God's action in the world. The theological and critical reflection about mission is called missiology." [emphasis in original]

== Current developments ==
Today missiology is taught at many Christian theological schools and its scope of study and relations with the other theological and social sciences differ to a great extent. While it continues to be considered a Christian theological discipline, some have contested whether missiology is a strictly church discipline or academic one.

There are several academic societies for missiology, such as the North American organizations the American Society of Missiology (ASM) and Evangelical Missiological Society (EMS), and the International Association for Mission Studies (IAMS). In European academia, especially in German-speaking contexts, there is the growing dominance of the term "intercultural theology."

The close interaction between missiology, social sciences and culture made scholars to shape the discipline within the framework of history and sociology and remind about the "colonial past of missions" when Christians often attempted to use their political and economic power in evangelism. Many missiologists are now disavowing these methods and attempt to construct a new paradigm that does not employ such imperialistic approaches which lead to language and cultural imposition.

== See also ==
- List of missiologists
- Doctor of Missiology
- Intercultural studies
