= Breen (surname) =

Breen is an Irish surname. Notable people with the surname include:

- Abs Breen (born 1979), English DJ, member of the band Five
- Barry Breen (born 1948), Australian footballer
- Benjamin Breen (born 1985), American historian of science and medicine
- Bobby Breen (1927–2016), American actor and singer
- Carol Breen (born 1986), Irish footballer
- Chris Breen (born 1989), Canadian ice hockey player
- Claire Breen, New Zealand law academic
- Craig Breen (1990–2023), Irish rally driver
- Dan Breen (1894–1969), IRA member and Fianna Fáil politician
- David Breen (born 1985), Irish hurler
- Edward D. Breen, American business executive
- Edward G. Breen (1908–1991), American politician
- Else Breen (1927–2025), Norwegian children's writer, novelist and literary scientist
- Gary Breen (born 1973), Irish footballer
- Gavan Breen (1935–2023), Australian linguist
- George Breen (1935–2019), American freestyle swimmer
- Harry Breen, Northern Irish police officer
- James Breen (disambiguation), multiple people
- Jim Breen (born 1947), American linguist
- Jim Breen (rugby league) (1899–1957), Australian rugby league footballer
- Joe Breen, Canadian football player
- John Breen (RAF officer) (1896–1964), World War II Royal Air Force commander
- Joseph Breen (1890–1965), American film censor, founded the Legion of Decency in 1934
- Kate Breen (1869–1937), Irish nationalist
- Kelly Breen (disambiguation), multiple people
- Marie Breen (1902–1993), Australian Senator
- Michael Breen (disambiguation), multiple people
- Matthew Breen (disambiguation), multiple people
- Neil Breen (born 1958), American filmmaker and actor
- Olivia Breen (born 1996), British athlete
- Patrick Breen (born 1960), American actor, playwright and screenwriter
- Richard Breen (disambiguation), multiple people
- Shannon Breen (born 1989), American football player
- Suzanne Breen, Northern Ireland editor for the Sunday Tribune
- T. H. Breen (born 1942), American historian
- Walter Breen (1928–1993), numismatist and pederast
- Wallace Breen, a fictional character from the Half-life series of video games
- Vegard Breen (born 1990), Norwegian cyclist
