= Improv Asylum =

Improvisational comedy theater in Boston, U.S.

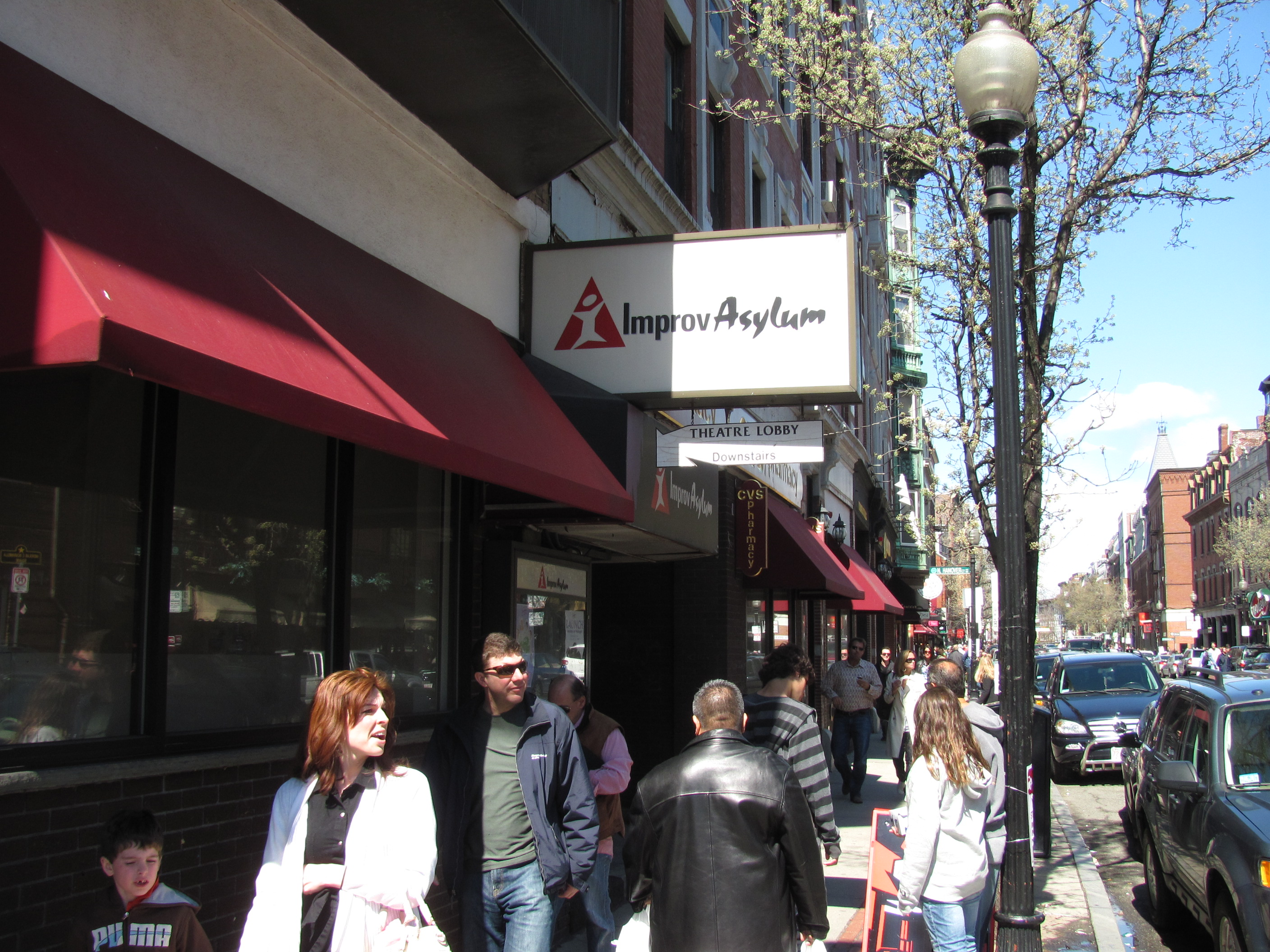
- View of the Improv Asylum from Hanover Street.

- Location of the Improv Asylum in Boston
- Address: 216 Hanover Street; Boston, Massachusetts; United States
- Coordinates: 42.362°N 71.056°W
- Owner: Norm Laviolette
- Type: Comedy club

Construction
- Opened: 1998
- Years active: 1998–present

Website
- improvasylum.com

Improv Asylum is an improvisational comedy theater in the North End neighborhood of Boston, Massachusetts, United States. The theatre was founded in 1998 by Paul D'Amato, Norm Laviolette, and Chet Harding. The theater produces multiple shows per week including its critically acclaimed mainstage show. The mainstage show is a blend of both sketch comedy and improvised scenes. Improv Asylum is the parent company of Asylum NYC, which was founded in 2017.

== History ==
By October 1998, co-founders Norm Laviolette and Chet Harding were performing with Improv Asylum at its Hanover Street venue in Boston's North End, where the company was presenting two shows on Saturdays. In March 1999, the Boston Herald reported that the troupe had been touring and attracting national attention. The company was scheduled to perform the following month at the Big Stinkin' International Improv & Sketch Comedy Festival in Austin, Texas, which Laviolette described as an important invitation. The troupe was also preparing to host the Boston Comedy Revolution that September, with companies including The Second City and The Groundlings expected to participate.

By August 1999, Improv Asylum was offering improvisational classes for children and adults in addition to its regular performances. That month, the theater hosted a two-day Comedy Camp for about two dozen Greater Boston teenagers, taught by cast member Lisa Schurga.

In the spring of 2010, Improv Asylum produced You're a Good Man, Scott Brown, an original musical satirizing the 2010 United States Senate special election in Massachusetts. Written and directed by Jeremy Brothers, the production attracted the attention of Senator Scott Brown and his wife, WCVB reporter Gail Huff, who attended a performance on March 31, 2010.

In December 2019, the theater presented No Rest for the Wicked Funny, a 24-hour comedy fundraiser benefiting Globe Santa, a program that provides holiday gifts to children in need.

Improv Asylum also established a presence in New York City. In February 2020, the company was operating in the former Upright Citizens Brigade theater in Chelsea, where it presented the solo show Nate, starring Natalie Palamides. In October 2021, Time Out New York reported that Asylum NYC, which it identified as Improv Asylum, had taken over the former UCB Chelsea space and was partnering with the North Coast Comedy Festival. In 2023, Asylum NYC opened an off-Broadway theater in the Flatiron District, and has hosted runs of notable shows including a run of the satire musical Slam Frank, and a run of the dark comedy Cellino v. Barnes, which played off of the advertising fame of real-life attorneys Cellino & Barnes.

== See also ==
- ImprovBoston
