= Bolehill =

Bolehill may mean:

- Bole hill, a place where lead was smelted in the open air;
- Bolehill, Derbyshire, an area of Wirksworth.
- Bolehill Recreation Ground, a public open space in Crookes, Sheffield.
