= Lune (barony) =

Barony in County Meath, Ireland

Lune Luíne (Irish)
- Barony
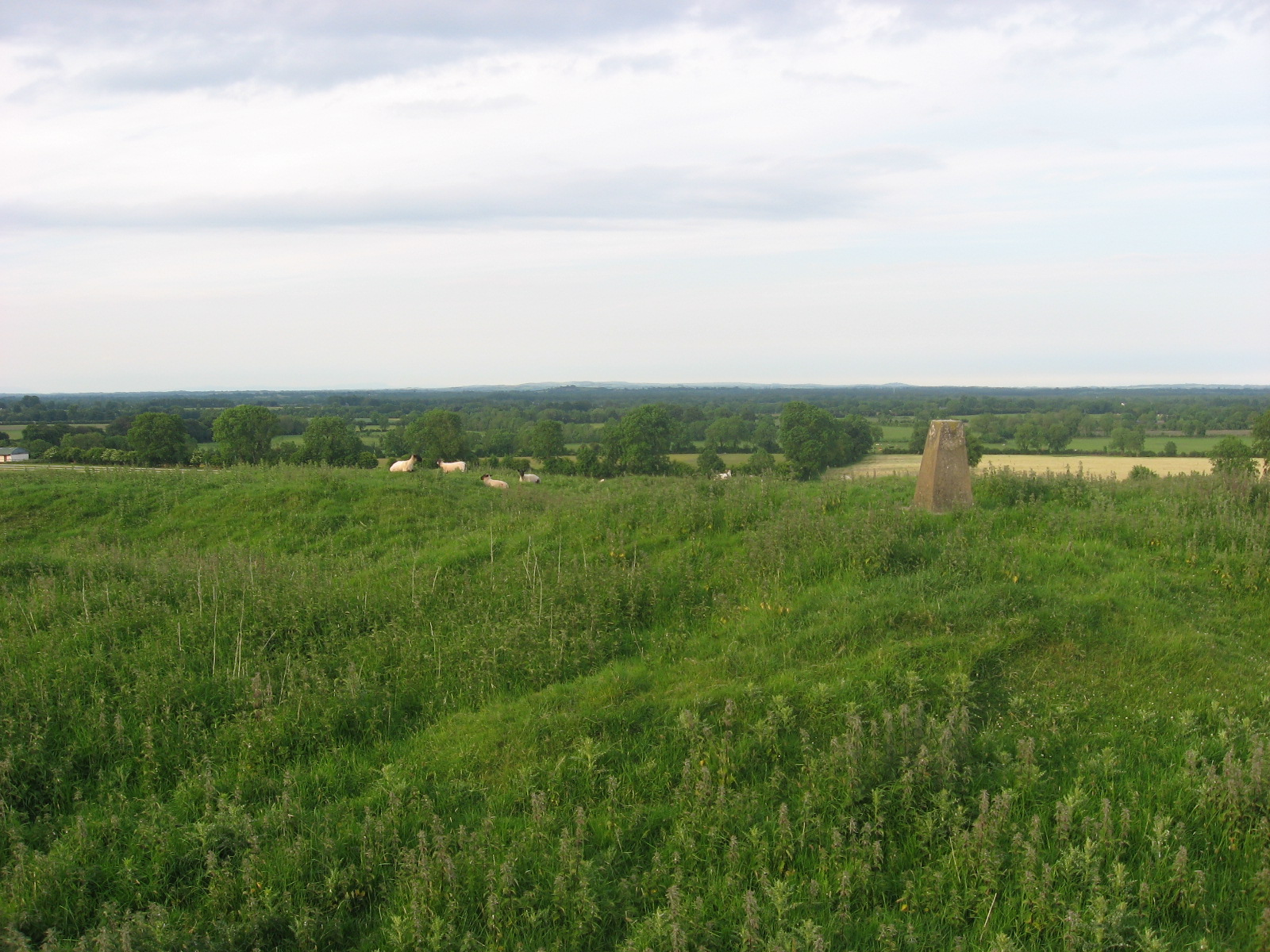
- Hill of Ward

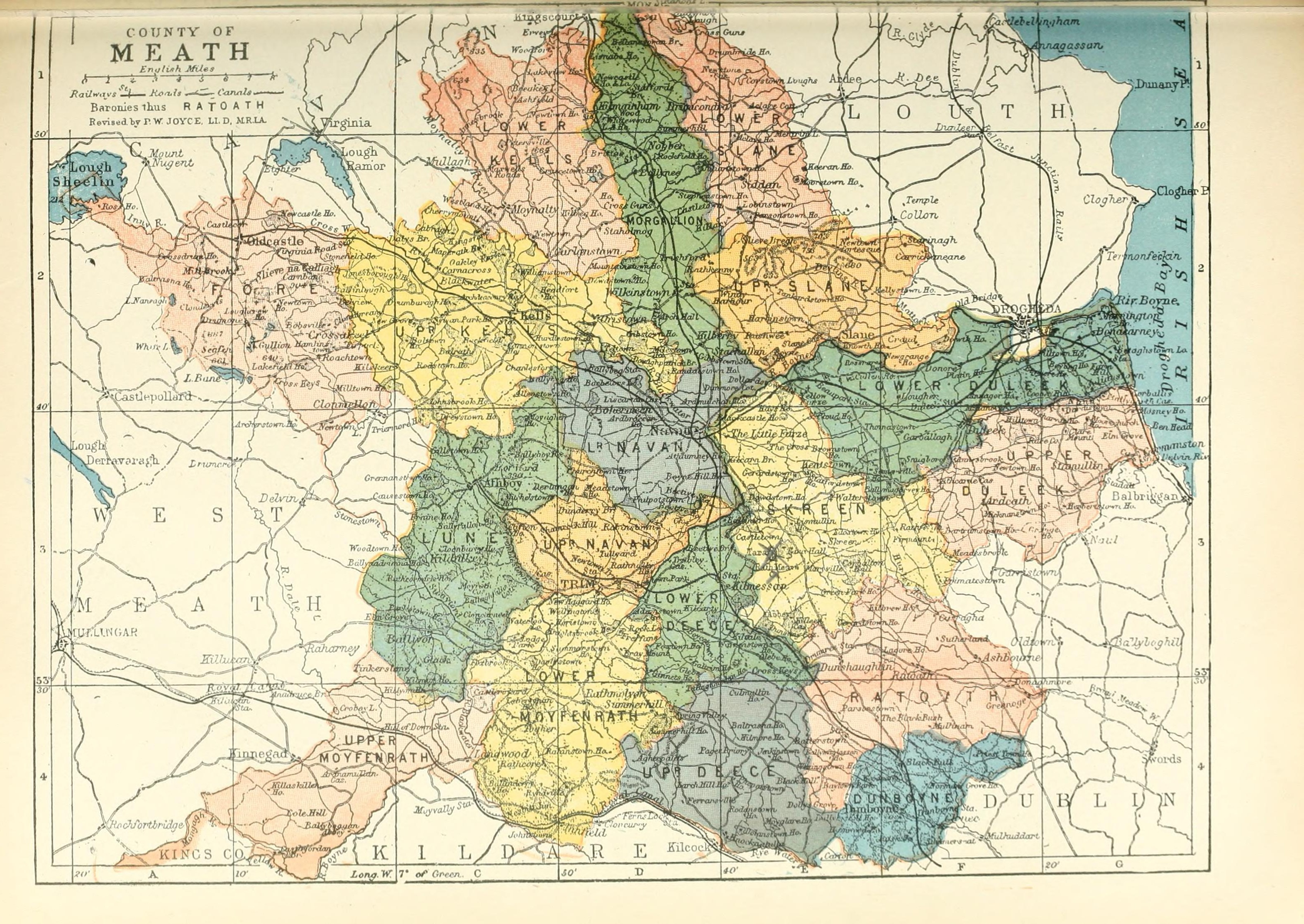
- Barony map of County Meath, 1900; Lune is in the west, coloured green.

- Location within Ireland
- Coordinates: 53°36′N 6°54′W
- Sovereign state: Ireland
- Province: Leinster
- County: Meath

Area
  - Total: 159.1 km^{2} (61.4 sq mi)

Lune (Irish: Luíne) is a historical barony in north-central County Meath, Ireland.

Baronies were mainly cadastral rather than administrative units. They acquired modest local taxation and spending functions in the 19th century before being superseded by the Local Government (Ireland) Act 1898.

== History ==
The barony takes its name from the Luigni tribe who were here in the 8th century AD; their name is derived from the god Lugh, who also named County Louth. Some of the Luigni allied with others of Brega and conquered much land in Connacht; the territory they settled was called Luighne Connacht and is the modern County Sligo barony of Leyny.

By the 12th century a sept of the Ua Braoin (Breens) were in Lune, as well as Ó Cearnacháin (Kernaghans). After the Norman conquest of Ireland, it was granted by Hugh de Lacy to Robert Misset as an Irish feudal barony in 1172.

== Geography ==
Lune is in the west of the county, on the border with County Westmeath. The Stonyford River flows through it and it contains the Hill of Ward.

== List of settlements ==
Settlements within the historical barony of Lune include:

- Athboy
- Ballivor
- Kildalkey
- Ráth Chairn
