= Al Gillespie =

New Zealand academic

- Born: New Zealand

Academic background
- Education: University of Nottingham
- Thesis: International environmental ethics: value and method in international environmental law and policy (1994)

Academic work
- Discipline: International and comparative environmental law
- Institutions: University of Waikato
- Main interests: The laws of war, civil liberties and social issues, including drug policies and refugees
- Notable works: Book: The Causes of War : Volume IV: 1650 – 1800 (2021)

Alexander M. Gillespie is a New Zealand legal academic. He is currently professor of law, specialising in international law related to war, the environment and civil liberties, and firearms, at the University of Waikato. He has served on international delegations including UNESCO, advised the New Zealand government on social issues and made a number of appearances before the Waitangi Tribunal. Gillespie frequently takes public positions on global conflict, climate change, refugees and environmental issues in the New Zealand media and has published seventeen books. He has won international and New Zealand awards in recognition of his understanding of how international law impacts society.

== Education and career ==
Gillespie obtained Bachelor of Laws and Master of Laws degrees with honours at the University of Auckland, and a PhD at the University of Nottingham. He undertook post-doctoral studies at Columbia University in New York City. As of 2022, Gillespie is a professor at the University of Waikato, and an external member of the New Zealand Centre for Environmental Law, a research centre hosted by Auckland Law School at the University of Auckland. He has advised the New Zealand Government on legal matters and provided some commissioned work for the United Nations. In 2005, Gillespie was named rapporteur for the World Heritage Convention as part of UNESCO. Gillespie was a professor at the Faculty of Law and Criminology of Ghent University (Department of European, Public and International Law) for six months, spanning 2018 and 2019. He said of his time at Ghent, that he was impressed by young Belgiums as "agents of change...[who were]... very pragmatic, with a healthy distrust of authority".

== Advisory roles ==
Gillespie has been involved in advising the New Zealand Government on social issues and in 2018 was acknowledged for his work on reviewing an earlier draft of A Zero Carbon Act for New Zealand: Revisiting Stepping stones to Paris and beyond, a report prepared for the New Zealand Government by Simon Upton in his capacity as The Parliamentary Commissioner for the Environment.

Between 2016 and 2018, Gillespie provided advisory assistance to Tūhonohono, a research project that aimed to establish how mātauranga and tikanga Māori could be fully applied in the marine environment of New Zealand, specifically in regard to compatibility with marine policies and law in the country. In a report of the research it was concluded that there needed to be "more inclusive and better resource management policies, practices and laws that enable the accurate application of tikanga and mātauranga Māori to the governance and management of the country's land-based and marine ecosystems...[and the]... emphasis should be on power-sharing arrangements that are suitable for Māori, suitable for the environment and therefore suitable for the nation". The report suggested that government statutes and regulations should be reviewed to ensure decisions were consistent with the Treaty of Waitangi.

WAI 262, commonly referred to as The Indigenous Flora and Fauna and Cultural Intellectual property Claim , was lodged with the Waitangi Tribunal on 9 October 1991 by six iwi in New Zealand. The report on the claim released in 2011, recommended:

Reform of laws, policies or practices relating to health, education, science, intellectual property, indigenous flora and fauna, resource management, conservation, the Māori language, arts and culture, heritage, and the involvement of Māori in the development of New Zealand's positions on international instruments affecting indigenous rights.

Gillespie, who made an appearance in front of the Waitangi Tribunal on this claim, suggested that before responding to the report, the New Zealand Government should consider how Canada, Australia and the United States had dealt the same issues. While he acknowledged the report had identified the problems, Gillespie said answers were needed, and "from his study of environmental customs and traditions in different countries...[he hoped]... to come up with a set of options for solutions".

== Public policy positions ==
=== Afghanistan ===
When Geoffrey Millar wrote in The Asian Media Centre in 2021, that the crisis in Afghanistan was likely to result in a "big change in New Zealand's geopolitical landscape", he cited an article in which Gillespie said that New Zealand had an ethical obligation to take more refugees. Gillespie wrote that it was likely Afghanistan would see a major increase in people fleeing persecution, [and] "the list of who could be considered traitors or face persecution by the Taliban [was] long. They [included] religious and ethnic minorities, dissidents, women, journalists, human rights workers and those previously in positions of power....[and these people]...are at risk largely because of their support for the Western presence in Afghanistan that New Zealand was part of". Gillespie told the NZ Herald that New Zealand and other countries needed "to decide what conditions they consider basic before deciding if the Taliban are legitimate and they can enter the international stage".

=== Ukraine ===
On 30 January 2022 Gillespie said he was "optimistic" that possible issues between Russia and Ukraine could be solved with diplomacy that found a "middle ground...about arms control and confidence building with military exercises". After Russia invaded Ukraine on 22 February 2022, Gillespie was asked in a radio interview what he thought Putin's intentions were. He said keeping an historical perspective was important and with Putin unrestrained by the Minsk agreements in 2014 and 2015 which had left the issue of Ukraine's sovereignty unresolved, the verbal agreement from NATO in 1994 not to expand had never being formalised. Gillespie said Putin was looking to make a mark in history and establish a sphere of interest rather than rebuild the Soviet Union. The role of the United Nations in managing this situation was seen by Gillespie as ineffective due to several countries voting against the resolution by the Security Council demanding that Russia immediately end its military operations in Ukraine, and the challenge for this body was to uphold the UN Charter and become united in protecting the sovereign rights of countries. Gillespie warned that a failure to do this, could create a precedent for other countries to carry out invasions. He predicted that Ukraine would be taken over by Russia and NATO should look to increase its influence.

When the New Zealand Government passed a law allowing sanctions to be imposed on Russia, Gillespie urged caution against "anti-Russian hysteria", and that following due process and fairness was important, and a wealthy Russian may not necessarily be pro-Putin. Gillespie later acknowledged that autonomous sanctions being put in place outside of the United Nations process was a break with "diplomatic tradition", but New Zealand could also offer non-lethal military assistance to Ukraine, manage the legalities around New Zealand citizens wanting to fight in Ukraine, take more refugees and consider import duties on permitted Russian imports. On Newstalk ZB, Gillespie was not prepared to predict what Putin was going to do, and stated that the sanctions did not amount to a "declaration of war" as claimed by Putin, but were an effective non-military intervention which would have considerable effect on Russia.

Gillespie has stated that the situation in Ukraine highlighted the relative impotency of the United Nations to live up to the principles in the founding Charter because of the power of veto over Security Council actions or intentions. He held as of 2 May 2022, that "Russian president Vladimir Putin [had] run his tanks over the fundamental principles of the UN Charter and disobeyed the International Court of Justice because of the unbridled power of veto...[against]...the last proposed Security Council resolution Russia...[which]...affirmed the territorial sovereignty of the Ukraine and condemned Russia's invasion as a violation of the United Nations Charter".

As Russia's blockade of food supplies leaving Ukraine looked likely to cause famine beyond the country, Gillespie said that while this is an "atrocity...[and]...invasions and war crimes are recognised as breaches of international law... causing famine as collateral damage in countries not directly related to the war is not a recognised crime". In the same piece, Gillespie did note that Geneva Conventions had prohibited the starvation of civilians as a method of war and Russia did support that in 2018. There was acceptance that these rules applied generally but were about protecting civilians within warzones, not to "prevent collateral damage to distant populations unconnected to a conflict....so while starvation of an enemy is not new, starvation of vulnerable but distant civilian populations is...it's partly a symptom of [a] globalised world, where interconnection, vulnerability and outdated or inadequate rules and restraints are all colliding".

When there were claims and counter claims by both Ukraine and Russia about the treatment of prisoners of war, Gillespie said that the Third Geneva Convention (1949), to which both countries are signatories, set up rules to respect the rights of prisoners. He contended that an independent third party such as the International Criminal Court should deal with disputes about how these rules were being applied, but noted that Russia had withdrawn from the Court, reflecting "just another measure of how far the observation of the laws of war [had] been eroded in Ukraine".

One year after the Russians invaded Ukraine, and the invoking of the UN Charter and international law to achieve a sustainable peace seemed unlikely, Gillespie wrote that New Zealand, along with other Western countries, had to re-consider its approach to the conflict. He acknowledged that while the country did not send troops to the area, neither had it taken the position of neutrality, or "remained indifferent to the aggression and atrocities, or their implications for a rule-based world". One important consideration for New Zealand Gillespie suggested, was the review of its defence budget and whether it was sufficient to retain collaborative arrangements and alliances. From that point, he said, the country's government must decide if it was going to move beyond being a regional 'police officer' [and] "carry its fair share of being part of an interlinked modern military deterrent". This would also require a review of the contribution to humanitarian assistance, possibly resulting in more direct funding or widening the visa arrangements to allow a greater number of refugees from Ukraine into New Zealand. Significant also to Gillespie, was how New Zealand diplomatically developed its vision of peace and dealt with [the] "hard questions about territorial integrity, accountability for war crimes, reparations and what might happen to populations that [didn't] want to be part of Ukraine". This piece by Gillespie was cited in State of Threat The Challenges to Aotearoa New Zealand's National Security (2023) supporting the contention that while New Zealand's contributions of aid to Ukraine were proportionately lower than other countries, they did show a commitment to ending the conflict. At the time of writing, Gillespie noted that China's role and intentions in the area were uncertain and if they supplied arms directly to Russia, New Zealand would be under pressure to take measures that could adversely affect their trading relations with them. The final consideration noted by Gillespie was that the nuclear threat should be taken seriously by New Zealand [because] "if the Ukraine war [spun] out of control, [the country] would be in an emergency unlike anything [it had] witnessed before".

=== New Zealand's relationship with China ===
In 2020 Five Eyes, an international alliance to which New Zealand belonged, released a statement claiming China was in breach of its international obligations by not the respecting the autonomy of Hong Kong. Gillespie said that the Five Eyes statement was "fair and not inflammatory...[and that]... China's actions [were] not consistent with the promises China made over Hong Kong when it was handed back in 1997". Gillespie accepted it was a challenge for New Zealand not to offend China, either as an important trading partner or more traditional allies, but said it would be reasonable for Five Eyes to expect New Zealand to regularly speak up on such issues.

An article in the New Zealand media in 2021 that noted Nanaia Mahuta had not directly criticised China for their treatment of the Uyghurs, cited an article by Gillespie in which he said New Zealand "sticking to the middle ground [would] look less like wise diplomacy and more like appeasement" and warned that other democracies could form new alliances, such as the Quadrilateral Security Dialogue (Quad), without including New Zealand.

As New Zealand consolidated trading agreements with China in February 2022, concerns were raised on Radio New Zealand about whether that country's human rights record, including an alleged "genocide" against Uighur Muslims, might affect relationships between the two countries. Gillespie said China had a history of attempting to assimilate Muslim populations into a "collective identity" that resulted in many improvements for the Chinese people, but because New Zealand was somewhat hamstrung by an economic dependency on China, they were reticent to criticize them for alleged human rights, often in contrast to the approach of Australia. He predicted that while in principle, putting pressure on China to be more open was correct, the response of the New Zealand government was likely to be cautious.

On 28 June 2023, immediately prior to the New Zealand Prime Minister Chris Hipkins meeting with Xi Jinping, General Secretary of the Chinese Communist Party, Gillespie wrote that the meeting was an opportunity to build on previous economic cooperation between the countries, with China also likely to value New Zealand's input into discussions around possible peace initiatives in Ukraine. Gillespie suggested however, that New Zealand was walking a "diplomatic tightrope" with a scheduled attendance by Hipkins at the NATO summit in Lithuania in July, and the consideration of the pending decision on involvement in AUKUS – both of which were likely to take positions on China as a possible security challenge and a perceived threat of "increasing assertiveness in the Indo-Pacific region". Gillespie noted that New Zealand had reiterated its position that under international law they effectively rejected China's historical claims of sovereignty over some islands in the South China Sea.

On 24 February 2025, Gillespie argued that recent Chinese actions including military maneuvers in the South China Sea and Taiwan Strait, naval exercises in the Tasman Sea, the Chinese–Cook Islands partnership agreement and Chinese espionage and domestic interference would push New Zealand closer towards joining the AUKUS security pact.

=== Government management of a pandemic ===
When New Zealand went into its first lockdown in March 2020 during the government's management of COVID-19, Gillespie said that people could be fined under laws at the time for flouting the lockdown rules, but suggested Prime Minister Jacinda Ardern could also declare a state of emergency and issue an epidemic notice under the 2006 Epidemic Preparedness Act. Gillespie explained that the notice allowed the government to "change existing laws, subject to only a few safeguards of review, some civil rights and constitutional structure...[and]... if deemed absolutely necessary, the government can do nearly anything that needs to be done to stop the epidemic of COVID-19 in New Zealand".

Gillespie suggested that under emergency legislation to manage the pandemic, people in the country could have some infringements of their rights, however as long as the restrictions remained "precautionary and in proportion to the risk, it [was] unlikely they will be challenged seriously". He had previously told The Panel on RNZ that there were three rules in New Zealand sthat needed updating to manage the pandemic. These were laws around quarantining, compulsory vaccinations and spitting, which was classed as common assault under the Summary Offences Act 1981. Writing in The Conversation on 19 May 2020, Gillespie said the New Zealand Government's handling has been both praised and criticised, with accusations of illegality possibly playing on fears that the new law [was] a "lurch towards authoritarianism under cover of the pandemic". He accepted that in future, laws in these situations would need more scrutiny and oversight.

As Auckland prepared for another lockdown in August 2020, Gillespie said the laws being enacted had clear powers to deal with issues such as mandatory testing.

=== The right to protest in a democracy ===
==== Against Government measures to deal with COVID-19 ====
In November 2021 when there was a growing number of protests against the response of the New Zealand government to COVID-19, causing the Prime Minister Jacinda Ardern to abandon events to support the roll out of the vaccine, Gillespie co-authored an opinion piece that held while there were some "legal underpinnings of the right to protest, specific protest actions must be in accordance with the law...[and]...must not be unduly disorderly, violent or unsafe". In the same article, the writers said it was important for the police to uphold the law, but in the interests of keeping the peace and the public safe, the preferred approach would be de-escalation and "any intervention should only be taken at the highest level of the police force, when there [was] no other means to protect the public order from an imminent risk of violence".

By early February 2022 when the Wellington protest was underway, Gillespie told Newstalk ZB that the police could remove protesters off parliamentary grounds to maintain security, and while noting that negotiation was preferable, added that the situation was "coming to a climax and it may not end well."

After the release of the review by the Independent Police Conduct Authority into the Policing of the Protest and Occupation at Parliament 2022, an article co-authored by Gillespie and Claire Breen said the document identified how the occupation differed from earlier protests in New Zealand and it was important to acknowledge while the report noted there were areas in which the police could improve in management of such events, the generally positive review, might go some way to re-building trust between the public and the police following the 1981 anti-Springbok tour protests. The authors identified key areas for improvement should include better preparedness by police to ensure safety of its officers, caution around what was used to disperse protestors to protect their right to peaceful process without threat of injury, and a review of trespass laws to manage large events. Another suggestion was that the current arrest laws needed to be both effective in managing mass events of public disorder and conform with the Bill of Rights Act. As evidence of the ineffectiveness of the arrest laws, the article noted: "Although about 300 protesters were arrested, 170 had the charges withdrawn for several main reasons: an inability to identify the arresting officer and link the arresting officer to the arrested person; insufficient documentation about what an arrested person had done; and insufficient evidence to prove the charges. The lesson for future similar events [was] that greater numbers of officers must be available for deployment, with improved processing and evidence collection systems."

Gillespie was not surprised that an online poll of 525 people in February 2022 had shown 28 percent opposed the vaccine mandates in place in New Zealand and 29 percent supported the protest on the lawns of Parliament. He said it was the responsibility of the Government to show that mandates were necessary in the interests of public safety, and "any restrictions on liberties must continually be justified through a democratic process, and for that you need a free press and... a functioning Parliament". He expressed concern about death threats and hate speech from some of the protestors at Parliament because it was a crime within the Crimes Act and held that there needed to be "zero tolerance when [it was] towards journalists or parliamentarians."

==== Consideration of disruptions ====
In 2023, protests in Wellington calling for the government to restore a nationwide passenger rail service, resulted in damage to property and disruption to the public. Gillespie said that such protests were likely to escalate globally with growing frustration over a lack of government action to address the climate emergency, and this presented a challenge for governments and legal systems to "find ways to adapt, without risking a climate protest arms race that may only encourage increasingly unreasonable impacts on the general public". He made the case that, while the right to protest was not covered specifically by law, it was generally recognised as a "manifestation of the rights to freedom of movement, association and peaceful assembly in most liberal societies", protected globally by the United Nations Universal Declaration of Human Rights, and in New Zealand, by the Bill of Rights Act 1990. According to Gillespie, "the right to protest is not absolute...[and]...it can be subject to such reasonable legal limits as can be justified in a free and democratic society". He maintained protesting not be permissible if it risked "violence or public safety", or illegal if it intentionally caused "serious disruption to ordinary life", the challenge being "assessing the scale and impact of the inconvenience, and the rights and freedoms of others affected". Gillespie concluded:

Climate protests exist at a moral and legal intersection. Reducing carbon emissions means targeting roads, highways and fossil fuel-powered vehicles by creating blockades and choke-points. But for centuries, authorities have been charged with keeping those vital routes open for citizens...Law and policy already acknowledge the climate crisis will demand enormous effort and change. They cannot also become blunt tools for repressing social movements dedicated to holding those same powers to account.

=== Partnership with NATO ===
Although geographically New Zealand was not able to be a full member of the North Atlantic Treaty Organization (NATO), Gillespie explained that the country's Prime Minister Chris Hipkins was invited to a summit meeting of the alliance in Lithuania in July 2023 with the status of a 'partner' because the country was part of Indo-Pacific Four (IP4; Australia, Japan, New Zealand and South Korea), "an Indo-Pacific cohort that includes Australia, Japan and the Republic of Korea". Gilliespie noted that while Hipkins had a "front row seat" for debates on several key issues, the implications of the partnership for New Zealand were unclear in light of several expectations NATO had of partners. At the summit, NATO indicated partners should spend at least 2% of their gross domestic product (GDP) on defence, seen by Gillespie as being a challenge for New Zealand to sustain. There was a reconsideration by the alliance around managing a potential nuclear escalation of the Ukrainian situation and a request for partners to also reconsider their support for the Treaty on the Prohibition of Nuclear Weapons – again, a situation that would be problematic for New Zealand who were committed to the Treaty. Gillespie also contended that while New Zealand's support for Ukraine had been good, "it will need to be better to fall in line with NATO expectations of its partners".

=== New Zealand's national security policies ===
When the New Zealand Government released two defence policy reviews and a National Security Strategy on 4 August 2023, Gillespie took the position that the documents [spoke] "clearly and coherently about the risks to New Zealand's security...[resting on]...four broad pillars of understanding". The first of these, according to Gillespie, was the geopolitical uniqueness of New Zealand, as a "strong sovereign identity...anchored in the Pacific", with a government obligated to be prepared for threats to the people as "the most valuable assets...[of]...their socially cohesive society". Gillespie suggested the second pillar acknowledged that the range of threats, "from terrorism and climate change to attempts to subvert New Zealand democracy", reflected a wider threat to a "rules-based international system" and challenged many assumptions upon which the country's foreign policy had been based. The third consideration identified by Gillespie was that New Zealand needed to reassess their partnerships with other countries, accept isolation was not an option and explore more collaborations [to] "address shared security challenges". Gillespie concluded the final pillar was for New Zealand to realistically recognize China as a "major driver of geopolitical change, especially in its willingness to be more assertive and willing to challenge existing international rules and norms...[particularly]...in the Pacific [where they could] threaten to fundamentally alter the regional strategic balance".

The New Zealand Government, as part of the Security intelligence Service's responsibility "to detect, investigate, collect and analyse intelligence on matters of national security", released New Zealand's Security Threat Environment 2023 An assessment by the New Zealand Security Intelligence Service on 11 August 2023. Gillespie said it indicated "a genuine shift towards more open and public discussion of these crucial policy areas", and along with the other documents released, provided a perspective on the country's place in a "fast-evolving geopolitical landscape". He noted that the assessment showed the threat to the country from violent extremism remained "low", with no awareness of specific attacks being planned, most extremists fitting "well defined categories", and only a small group of "politically motivated, potentially violent, anti-authority conspiracy theorists". The assessment did show awareness of espionage activities and Gillespie concluded [that these by] "foreign intelligence agencies against New Zealand, both at home and abroad, [were] persistent, opportunistic and increasingly wide-ranging".

As New Zealand approached a general election in 2023, Gillespie contended there had been little public debate about foreign policy, and listed a series of questions that an incoming government would be expected to answer. Areas for clarification, he suggested, were candidates' views on whether the country was going to join "pillar two" of the AUKUS security pact, how it would respond to conflicts involving China and the USA and the nature of its relationships with countries in the Pacific. Questions about the level of support New Zealand provided to Ukraine, what their position toward the conflict would be if there was a change of government in the US, and issues around trade and sanctions were also seen by Gillespie as needing positions from political parties. In light of the country's response to climate change being assessed as "highly insufficient", Gillespie said the interrelated challenges of dealing with climate change and foreign aid would require clear answers from politicians, particularly where they stood in relation to the Green Climate Fund and the Global Methane Pledge. Gillespie noted that the amount of its gross income New Zealand allocated for aid to developing countries was currently below the OECD average, and said voters needed to know whether the country would increase or decrease this. Important also, was New Zealand's commitment to continue taking 1,500 refugees annually.

== Awards ==
Gillespie, along with Siouxsie Wiles, received the 2021 Critic and Conscience of Society Award, in recognition of his public commenting on COVID-19, "terrorism, cannabis law reform, and gun regulation". The award, which includes a grant, is given annually to an academic staff member who has been judged by an independent panel to have provided the public with "expert commentary on an issue or issues affecting the New Zealand community or future generations".

In 2019, Gillespie won the Francqui medal, also known as the International Francqui Professor Chair. As a requirement of the award, Gillespie presented a lecture entitled 2050: The Challenge of Peace and Sustainability in a Fragmented International Context, of which he said "I talked about the state of the world today, the challenges we’re likely to face in the next few decades, covering law and politics in the international sphere, from the risks of environmental change, and conflict".

Gillespie was awarded The New Zealand Law Foundation International Research Fellowship in 2003 for his research into "legal principles, policy and science of biodiversity, wildlife and ecosystems within international law", and the selection panel, comprising Sir Ivor Richardson, Justice Bruce Robertson and Professor Richard Sutton, said Gillespie's application showed that he had "the rare ability to synthesise the interdisciplinary science, law and social policy issues involved".

Gillespie was awarded the Fulbright Research Scholarship in 1998.

== Selected publications ==
The Causes of War : Volume IV: 1650 – 1800 (2021). This is the fourth volume of a projected five-volume series that explores the causes of war from 3000 BCE to the 21st century by documenting the history of international law within treaties and how they were negotiated.

The Long Road to Sustainability: The Past, Present, and Future of International Environmental Law and Policy (2018). Gillespie considers why humanity has struggled to achieve sustainable development over several thousand of years, and takes the approach [that] "economic, social, and environmental conundrums have stalled the quest for the long term viability of both our species and the ecosystems in which we reside".

Waste Policy: International Regulation, Comparative and Contextual Perspectives (2015). In this book, Gillespie takes the position that all forms of waste are "expanding exponentially, and are often of a hazardous nature...[and this has]..legal and political implications". Klaus Bosselmann from the University of Auckland, New Zealand, reviewed the book and said that it shows how "smart policies can lead to minimizing waste and to creating material flows consistent with ecological flows".

International Environmental Law, Policy, and Ethics: Second Edition (2014). This second edition challenges the assumption that there are shared goals amongst nations when it comes to protecting the international environment and shows across nations there are laws and policies that are inconsistent and contradictory and likely to fail. In a review of the first edition, Lawyers Weekly described the book [as] "a short but incisive review of the foundations of international environmental law ...[and]... Gillespie is impressive in his use of a plethora of international environmental conventions, declarations and statements to support his arguments".

A history of the laws of war: Volume 3 The Customs and Laws of War with Regards to Arms Control (2011). The third volume in this series examines the control of weaponry from the Bronze Age to the Nuclear Age. The American Society of International Law Newsletter, in reviewing the book said [that] the three volumes "provide a vivid, detailed, and especially readable account of the [law of war]".

Conservation, biodiversity and international law (2011). This book examines the debates about conservation at the global level within the context of legal frameworks that can pull together "the issues of science, ethics and policy". Francesco Bandarin, UNESCO Assistant Director-General for Culture, said the book offered "a complete guide to the complex world of treaties that regulate conservation at the global scale".

The Illusion of Progress: Unsustainable Development in International Law and Policy (2001). This book critiques sustainability and argues that the "real issues such as consumption, population growth and equity are either sidestepped or manipulated in international policy and law". The (UK) Journal of Environmental Law reviewed the book as having "powerful arguments against the logic of the existing situation...[and is|...a challenging and thought provoking work that makes us consider the direction that the international community is headed...".
