= Missional community =

Christian group

A Missional community is a group of people, about the size of an extended family, who are united through Christian community around a common service and witness to a particular neighborhood or network of relationships. The Missional Community doesn't exist for anything less than making disciples of Jesus among these networks or neighborhoods. The participants of missional communities find their primary identity of "church" within the missional community, rather than a larger worship service or small group. In essence, this group of people becomes a close-knit spiritual family on mission together.

== General characteristics ==
Missional Communities (MCs) are designed to be a flexible, local expression of church, not dependent on typical church buildings or church services. MCs have been described as "small enough to care but large enough to dare." Missional Communities may be called by other names, such as Clusters, Go Communities, Incarnational Communities, or Mission Shaped Communities. MCs are primarily led by laity and are "lightweight and low maintenance" and most often meet 3–4 times a month in their missional context. Missional Communities place a strong value on life together, with the expressed intention of seeing those they impact choose to start following Jesus. With this focus, a Missional Community will often grow and multiply into other MCs. Missional Communities are most often networked within a larger church community, often with many other Missional Communities.

An MC has leaders who, through a process of discernment, decide their mission vision and then invite people to join them in reaching that particular context. The leaders of the MC are held accountable by the leadership of the greater church community, both for what they do and for the way in which they do it (i.e., character as well as task). "Low control, high accountability" is one way to describe relationships between the Missional Community and the church body and leadership. Alex Absalom describes the focus of a missional community in this way:

The group balances its energies between an upward movement towards God, an inward movement toward the MC as a place of identity, and an outward movement to represent Christ to their mission context. When they gather, they express this in creative ways that are appropriate to their context. In fact, there will be great diversity between groups in how this looks, with a variety of faces and voices being given room to step forward and contribute what they can. The only 'rule' is that they do not try to do a miniature version of a Sunday church service.

Since Missional Communities are meant to be led by laity, running the community can be spread throughout the group so that it doesn't make a few leaders do all of the work. This sharing of the work is a key ingredient and one of the main benefits of these mid-sized groups. People don't approach it as consumers but as participants. While some MCs meet in homes, it is not uncommon for many of them to meet in the particular mission context they are reaching into. (For instance, a MC reaching out to the homeless would meet on the streets with the homeless rather than trying to bus them to another location.)

Missional Communities often have small groups within the larger body, with small-group leaders being held accountable by the Missional Community Leaders. The small groups work as places of support, challenge and closeness, as the wider MC gathering is too large for general sharing of prayer requests and the like. MCs will also gather periodically with the larger church body for what is referred to as a Celebration Service. This usually involves a time for corporate worship, teaching, stories and re-envisioning the wider community. The larger church body determines the frequency of these Celebration Services, ranging from every week to once a month. In an existing church, as opposed to a new church plant, regular Sunday services often perform this function, showcasing and celebrating what is going on across that particular church in their Missional Communities.

More often than not, when Missional Communities reach the size of 30–40 people they begin to intentionally work on starting a new MC. As before, any new MC is driven by the presence of accountable leaders who have sought God for a clear and specific mission vision. This could mean sending out two leaders to start a new community, maybe a Small Group is sent out en masse, or even half the group stays with the current MC while the other half begins a new community. However the group is multiplied, the essential element is expanding the reach of the church into a new context.

== History ==
Missional Communities emerged in England in the mid-1990s, primarily through the experimenting of the church St Thomas', Crookes in Sheffield. Although they were first experimented with in inner city London in the late 1980s, they became more fully formed when Mike Breen became the senior pastor of St Thomas' Sheffield in 1994. They were described as being multiplying missionary congregations and called 'Clusters'. The focus of the Clusters was on a group of Christians operating as a community together in mission. Leaders were encouraged to seek God for a vision for a new expression of church and, with training and support, they could be released to gather a team and pursue that dream.

As St Thomas' grew, many MCs were planted into the urban center of the city. The church met for Sunday celebrations in a variety of large rented facilities, ending up in a huge disused nightclub, the Roxy, where the Rolling Stones had once played. In 1998, however, with only a couple of weeks notice, the building was closed down for breaking fire code, and the church was forced to scatter into their various MC gatherings for Sunday worship. It took almost a year for a new permanent home to be found – during which time the original MCs that had been sent out had doubled in number, with many people coming to know Jesus during that year when the church had been forced to go into all the city.

Gradually the stories about MCs started spreading, both across the UK and Northern Europe and more and more churches began using this church structure. In 2004 the Anglican church released a report, "Mission-Shaped Church", examining the viability and success of this movement within the Anglican church, including a foreword by Archbishop of Canterbury Rowan Williams. Also, the European Church Planting Network picked up on this approach and hundreds upon hundreds of churches were planted as a result. Between 2006 and 2009, over 720 churches were planted across Europe. This was the first time this had been done in European church history.

In the mid-2000s this model of church began to spread to the United States. Early pioneers in this movement, such as Community of Joy in Phoenix, Arizona, Norman Community Church in Norman, Oklahoma and Trinity Grace in New York City were some of the first American churches to embrace this structure. Missiologists such as Eddie Gibbs at Fuller Seminary and Kent Hunter of Church Doctor Ministries began to direct both established churches and church planters to the UK to see these decentralized and reproducible Missional Communities.

Mike Breen, the former senior pastor of St. Thomas' Sheffield who originated Missional Communities, moved to Pawleys Island, South Carolina and in 2008 began 3DM, a coaching entity that comes alongside churches of varying sizes to help them transition to this missional/discipleship model. With the emergence of 3DM within the United States, there was increased interest in these mid-sized communities. In November 2010, Mike Breen and Alex Absalom published a book entitled Launching Missional Communities - A Field Guide, where they related their experience with and approach to Missional Communities. In 2011, Reggie McNeal, a best selling Christian author, released a book detailing the world-wide rise of Missional Communities entitled, "Missional Communities: The rise of the Post-Congregational Church."

The local churches choosing to make this transition vary largely in church denomination, but the largest percentage currently involved with this movement in the United States are Baptists, Lutherans, Assembly of God, Nazarene, Presbyterians, Episcopalians and non-denominational churches.

More broadly speaking, even the term Missional Community is seeping into the consciousness of the evangelical world of the United States as the first large-scale conference was held about MCs. Verge: Missional Community Conference happened in Austin, Texas on February 4–6, 2010 and sold out weeks before the conference. In 2011, Verge united with Exponential, the largest conference for church planters, where the theme was, "Missional Communities: Discovering Old Truths in New Paradigms.". In 2012, the emergence of Missional Communities continued its prominent place at the Verge Conference, as well as seeing an expanded Missional track at the Exponential Conference and the Sync Conference at Charleston Southern University.

== Network and accountability ==
If MCs are "low control/high accountability", having a church structure that invests in lay leaders and empowers them while holding them accountable is of paramount importance. Perhaps the most widely used vehicle for this are called Discipleship Huddles, which is a group of 4–10 leaders. The frequency of these groups differs based on each individual church, but generally speaking they meet at least once a month and as often as once a week. Huddles are a place where leaders are actively being discipled in a community of peers, where they are held accountable for the leadership of their groups by their Huddle leader. The two central questions of a Huddle are: 1) What is God saying to you? 2) What are you going to do about it? By seeing that leaders follow through on the plans they form from answering both of these questions, a culture is developed of both high support and high challenge. Over a period of time, this allows leaders to cultivate and sustain the character, skills and spiritual depth needed to lead.

As churches with Missional Communities tend to be far more decentralized than most Western churches, the network of these Huddles are essential to the unity and direction of the wider church. Usually the Senior Pastor will Huddle 4–10 leaders, these leaders will in turn Huddle 4–10 leaders, who in turn Huddle the leaders they are responsible for. As the church grows, multiplying Missional Communities and Small Groups, more Huddles are added as necessary. What most churches have found helpful is an agreed upon DNA in the language that all leaders use that filter down to their various groups. Most often this is the language of LifeShapes, a set of 8 Shapes that distill the teachings and principles of the Bible and Jesus, that were fashioned by Mike Breen as Missional Communities first developed and captured in his book "Building a Discipling Culture".

== A typical gathering ==
There is tremendous flexibility in the forms of Missional Communities, since the intention is that they are highly accessible to the culture into which they are planted. They are anchored around the three core relationships of life – UP to God, IN to family and friends, and OUT to the wider society which they seek to be a blessing to. In practice MCs do tend to certain things pretty regularly, albeit in slightly different ways according to their context, including:

- Food – ideally sharing a meal together
- Socializing/ laughing/ having fun
- Breaking Bread/ sharing Communion
- Story-telling (i.e. testimony), especially of things people are grateful to God for
- Bringing praise and worship to God
- Offering prayer for healing and prophetic encouragement to anyone who has particular need
- Studying the Scriptures together, especially from what God has been speaking to the leader (or whoever is leading that portion) about during the past week.
- Praying for the wider community that you are seeking to reach, as well as for the MCs witness there
- Planning practicalities for mission activities

In addition to providing this list, Alex Absalom comments, "We would summarize this as a 1 Corinthians 11-14 model, which seems the fullest unpacking of how a church oikos [extended household] would meet and express its life together. From what Paul writes, it is also clear that those gatherings were led in such a way that people who weren't yet Christians could come in and be welcomed, without it throwing all the plans into confusion."

As well, a Missional Community will go OUT together in specific missional activities, to serve and witness to their place of calling. Such events need to be regular and rhythmic, so that the group sees this as an integral part of their life together. It should be no more a 'special' than meeting to eat together or pray together is.

== See also ==
- Missional living
