= Nine O'Clock Service =

Church of England service in Sheffield, England, from 1986 to 1995

The Nine O'Clock Service ("NOS") was a Christian young adult alternative evangelical movement started in 1986 at St Thomas' Church in Crookes, Sheffield, England, by a group of musicians and artists. The service and the group associated with it grew to national prominence, but the service was stopped in 1995 following allegations of sexual and emotional abuse.

== Origins ==
Beginning as a simple alternative format service under the leadership of Christopher ('Chris') Brain, the group responsible for it developed a leadership structure that was endorsed by the leadership of St Thomas' Church. The average age of the members was 24 for much of NOS's life. The membership was significantly from non-church backgrounds.

Starting with about 10 people who worked on designing and creating the services, the congregation grew to almost 600 members while resident at St Thomas' Church. Main themes included care for the planet and concern about its abuse, simple lifestyle and development of relationships with non-churched people.

By 1988, David Lunn, then Bishop of Sheffield, sanctioned a move to a new site at Ponds Forge Rotunda in the centre of Sheffield. Around the same time, Chris Brain underwent training to be ordained as a priest in the Church of England. The Planetary Mass at Pond's Forge was marked by both bold liturgical experimentation and naive hopefulness. The suspended Roman Catholic priest and American Dominican theologian Matthew Fox was consulted.

According to a former member, Brain said that NOS was "discovering a postmodern definition of sexuality in the church". His entourage included "postmodern nuns", who wore black Lycra miniskirts and lingerie, performed household chores for Brain, and put Brain to bed with "sexual favours".

== Shut down (1995) ==
The number of community members stopped growing and service attendance plateaued at about 300. A major weakness in its duty of care was the lack of diocesan and general accountability for NOS. This was allowed because of its claimed international significance, which in the end came to nothing. Plans for communities elsewhere were in talks.

In 1995, a number of complaints began to surface of the sexual abuse of women in the group by Chris Brain. After an investigation by the Diocese of Sheffield, the group was shut down in August 1995. The Bishop of Sheffield demanded Brain's resignation after he confessed to having sexual relationships with young women in the congregation. There were also calls from former members of the congregation that he be defrocked. The Archbishop of York banned Brain from acting as an ordained priest. Initially refusing to step down, Brain eventually resigned in November 1995, the week before a BBC interview was aired in which he said "For a priest in a church setting, I would have to say I was involved in improper sexual conduct with a number of women". He then checked himself into a psychiatric hospital. The Diocese of Sheffield, through a seconded pastoral team led by Rachel Ross, the Reverend Andrew Teal and the Reverend Peter Craig-Wild, attempted to manage the pastoral care both of Brain and members of the community wounded by the scandal. A remnant of the community continued to meet, under different leadership, for some years afterwards in Sheffield.

== Criminal conviction of Chris Brain ==
In 2021 Brain was running a design consultancy in Wilmslow, Cheshire. Former NOS members contacted South Yorkshire Police, for the first time.

On 18 March 2024, Christopher Brain appeared at Sheffield Magistrates' Court to face a total of 34 charges of sexual offences (one of rape, 33 of indecent assault) against 11 members of the Nine O'Clock Service congregation. He was granted bail. South Yorkshire Police appealed for any further potential victims or witnesses to come forward. The case was transferred from Sheffield Crown Court to Inner London Crown Court to avoid the risk of someone connected to the case being known to one of the judges who might hear the case. On 30 April 2024 Chris Brain appeared at Inner London Crown Court and pleaded not guilty to one charge of rape and 33 charges of indecent assault regarding 11 women, all members of NOS, between 1981 and 1995. He was released on unconditional bail, with his trial set for 30 June 2025.

From June 2025 the Church of England offered support to victims and survivors. On Monday 30 June 2025 the trial began with Her Honour Judge Freya Newbery presiding, and the jury panel was selected. During the trial the church's curate at the time of the offences said that he had warned the archdeacon of Sheffield that Brain was growing unaccountable and NOS was heading for "disaster", to which the response was said to have been "We don't conduct witch hunts in the Sheffield diocese". On Wednesday 20 August 2025 the jury delivered guilty verdicts against Chris Brain in relation to 17 counts of indecent assault against nine women and found him not guilty of another 15 charges of indecent assault, but could not reach verdicts on a further four counts of indecent assault and one charge of rape.

In a retrial at Inner London Crown Court, Brain, now in custody, was found guilty in October 2026 of the five unresolved charges, making a total of 22 sexual offences against 13 women.

The Diocese of Sheffield took a very different attitude than it had in 1995, and set up an independent safeguarding review into "institutional failures".

== Books ==
Howard, Roland (1996). The Rise and Fall of the Nine O'Clock Service: A Cult Within the Church?. London: Mowbray. ISBN 0264674197.
