= Breen =

Breen may refer to:

- Breen (surname)
- The Breen (Star Trek), an alien species in the Star Trek universe.
- Breen, the Babylon 5 universe, a Narn cuisine similar to Swedish meatballs, first mentioned in the episode "Walkabout"
- Breens, the people of the fictional nation of Bregna in the animated television series Aeon Flux
- Jason Breen, fictional detective from the American TV series Kyle XY
- Wallace Breen, a major antagonist in the video game Half-Life 2
- Breen House, a house at St. Michael's Grammar School in Melbourne, Australia
- Breen, Colorado, an unincorporated community
- Breen Township, Michigan
- Breen, County Antrim, a townland in County Antrim, Northern Ireland
- Breen, County Tyrone, a townland in County Tyrone, Northern Ireland

== See also ==
- Brean, a village in Somerset, England
