= Cellino & Barnes =

American law firm

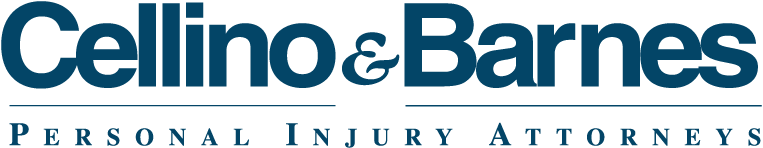
- Headquarters: Buffalo, New York
- No. of offices: 6
- Major practice areas: Personal injury
- Date founded: May 6, 1998
- Founder: Ross Cellino Jr. Steve Barnes
- Company type: Professional corporation
- Dissolved: June 2020
- Website: www.cellinoandbarnes.com

Cellino & Barnes was an American personal injury law firm based in Buffalo, New York. It was founded in 1998 by Ross Cellino Jr. and Steve Barnes, and dissolved in 2020. The firm was known for their jingle and memorable phone number while their status and high-profile dissolution inspired an off-Broadway play in 2018.

== History ==
Cellino & Barnes originated as Cellino & Likoudis in 1958, founded by Ross Cellino's father. The firm had multiple offices in New York State in addition to a branch in Los Angeles, California.

Described by The New York Times as "billboard royalty," the firm was a pioneering firm known for "flogging its brand loudly and crassly" according to The Wall Street Journal. By the end of the 1990s, the firm heavily publicized a $45 million settlement won for a client. In 2017, Cellino & Barnes had 50 attorneys and 250 employees in their offices. Over its history, the firm had over $165 million in profits with $1.5 billion in total case settlements. The firm was well known for their distinctive jingle and phone number which became an internet meme. The jingle was described by Variety as an "uptempo ditty that etched the firm’s name and number in the memory banks of most listeners: 'Cellino and Barnes/In-jury attorneys/Call 800-888-8888'."

In 2005, Cellino was issued a 6 month suspension from the practice of law and Barnes was issued a public censure. Cellino's suspension lasted a total of 19 months after undisclosed delays. The firm was temporally banned from advertising under Mr. Cellino's name. It changed its name to The Barnes Firm and changed all 150 large ad billboards advertising under M. Cellino's name. Upon his return, Cellino was not as involved in running the firm as before. In 2007, the firm was investigated for a scheme involving advancing settlement proceeds to clients contravening the state attorney ethics code.

Cellino filed to dissolve the firm in 2017, citing Barnes's denial of an attorney position to Cellino’s daughter Jeanna. The partners could not amicably dissolve the firm, leading to the appointment of a referee to make a binding decision in 2020 and subsequent lawsuits over fees.

Upon the final dissolution of the firm in June 2020, the two attorneys formed separate agencies: Cellino Law and the Barnes Firm.. Cellino Law kept the 888-888-888 number and the web domain formerly owned by Cellino & Barnes' "call8.com" which was set to a redirect to "cellinolaw.com", while "cellinoandbarnes.com" redirected to Barnes Firm's website at "thebarnesfirmcommunity.com".

On October 2, 2020, Barnes and his niece Elizabeth were killed in the crash of a TBM 700 single-engine private airplane in Pembroke, New York. He was 61 years old. Upon his death, Barnes' brother Rich Barnes took control of the Barnes Firm.

== Pop culture ==
=== Cellino & Barnes Challenge ===
In 2018, the Cellino & Barnes Challenge gained popularity on Instagram, with Broadway and Hollywood stars including Katharine McPhee re-creating the firm's jingle.

=== Saturday Night Live sketch ===
In March 2019, the firm and its jingle played a central role in a Saturday Night Live sketch called "Legal Shark Tank". The sketch parodies Shark Tank seating prominent attorneys Michael Avenatti, Rudy Giuliani, Jeanine Pirro, and Alan Dershowitz behind the dais as scandal‑plagued celebrities Robert Kraft and Jussie Smollett pitch for legal representation. Ross Cellino and Steve Barnes (played by Alex Moffat and Kyle Mooney) cut in repeatedly with their jingle.

=== Cellino v. Barnes on Broadway ===
Cellino v. Barnes
- Official play cover art
- Original language: English
- Written by: Mike B. Breen; David Rafieledes
- Characters: Ross Cellino; Steve Barnes
- Genre: Comedy

Premiere
- Date: August 1, 2024
- Place: Asylum NYC
- Directed by: Wesley Taylor; Alex Wyse

A two-man comedy play based on the partnership had an Off-Broadway run. Written by Mike B. Breen and David Rafailedes and directed by Wesley Taylor and Alex Wyse, Cellino v. Barnes starred Eric William Morris as Cellino and Noah Weisberg as Barnes. Previews started July 2024 with the play opening August 1, 2024 at the Asylum NYC theatre. It was positively received. Originally scheduled to run through October 13, it was repeatedly extended with its run finally ending on March 30, 2025.

The script shows the pair forced to leave a traditional firm, create their own practice, and devise the catchy “Don’t wait, call!” radio jingle driving rapid growth. The first half tracks their expansion across New York State through aggressive advertising and a high‑volume caseload. The second half (no intermission) focused on the partnership’s breakdown with Barnes portrayed as becoming increasingly power-hungry with references to real-life competitors such as William Mattar's "Hurt in a car?" jingle. Disputes over firm management, family involvement, and branding escalate into the 2017 lawsuit in which Cellino seeks to dissolve the firm, turning their once‑ubiquitous jingle into evidence. The play ends with the partners separated and the firm dismantled, closing with an acknowledgment of Barnes’s fatal plane crash in 2020.
