= Edward Breen =

Edward Breen may refer to:

- Edward G. Breen (1908–1991), American politician
- Edward D. Breen (born c. 1956), American business executive
