= David Rafailedes =

David Rafailedes is an American writer, director, and producer from Ohio who lives in New York City. He wrote Cellino v. Barnes, a broadway play about Cellino & Barnes, with Mike B. Breen. The show was positively received. Originally scheduled to run through October 13, 2024, it was repeatedly extended with its run ending on March 30, 2025.

Rafailedes was a 2024 Sundance Screenwriters Fellow and enrolled in the dual MBA/MFA program at NYU. He has also won the Alfred P. Sloan Foundation's Feature Film Production Grant and the Sundance Institute's Alfred P. Sloan Fellowship. He was a Buckeyes cross country athlete at Ohio State University.
