= Victor Varnado =

American stand-up comedian and actor (born 1969)

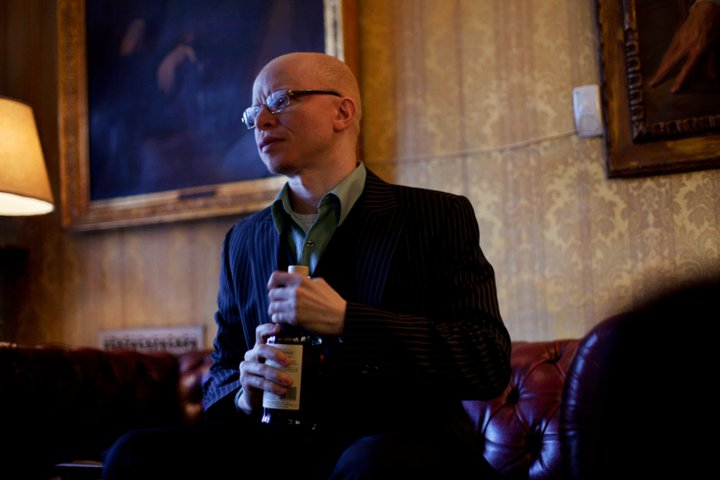
- Varnado on the set of Dream Job
- Born: May 15, 1969 (age 57); Gary, Indiana, U.S.
- Occupations: Actor; stand-up comedian
- Years active: 1996–present
- Website: victorvarnado.net

Victor Varnado (born May 15, 1969) is an American stand-up comedian and actor. He is an African American man with albinism. He was born legally blind due to his albinism. He grew up in Huntsville, Alabama and later moved to Minneapolis, Minnesota.

== Career ==
In Minneapolis, Varnado worked with the local improvisation troupes ComedySportz, The Bad Mamma Jammas and several regional theater companies, before landing his first role in the Big River Productions film Full Moon Rising, playing a copy clerk.

Soon after, his role in Giraffe Films' Kids Adventures in Oz spurred him on move to New York to pursue an acting career. His first "big break" came when he landed a role in Elton John's music video "Recover Your Soul".

Shortly after, he had a role in Harmony Korine's Julien Donkey-Boy (1999) with Ewen Bremner, Werner Herzog and Chloë Sevigny. He was subsequently cast in Universal's feature film End of Days (1999), starring Arnold Schwarzenegger. He was cast in a supporting role in Eddie Murphy's space-age comic thriller, The Adventures of Pluto Nash (2002).

Varnado was the winner of the Most Valuable Performer award in the 2001 Montreal Just For Laughs Improv Championship and bronze medalist in the 2002 Comedy Central Laugh Riots National Stand-Up Competition. He co-starred as Otis, an outrageous urban comic, in the independent film Hacks. Shown in the New York International Film Festival playing in Los Angeles, Hacks was an official selection for The Milan Film Festival.

In 2002, Varnado co-created the Iron Mule Short Comedy Film Festival with filmmaker and producer Jay Stern, a monthly event the duo hosts. It has been held at various theaters over the years, and as of August 2026, it now takes place at Asylum NYC.

Varnado worked on a superhero film with comic book legend Stan Lee. He has performed character voices for a video game for Sony PlayStation 3 called Rat Race.

Varnado is a member of Chicago City Limits, New York's longest running comedy improv theater company for which he was a writer and director as well as a regularly performing stand-up comedian. He has also been a guest on the popular podcast Keith and The Girl.

Varnado is the CEO of Supreme Robot Pictures, a production company that produced a mini-series for Penguin Random House called "The Great Fantasy Debate" and a stand-up comedy special event called "Bring Back Laughs".

In November 2025, Varnado was invited by the NY Philharmonic to be on a panel about the ethics of AI music at John Jay College.

== Filmography ==
Year	Title	Role	Other notes
1996	Full Moon Rising	Ollie	
1999	Julien Donkey-Boy	Rapper	
1999	End of Days	Albino	
2000	The Intern	Messenger	
2002	Hacks	Otis	
2002	The Adventures of Pluto Nash	Kelp	
2003	A Guy Thing	Hansberry	
2007	Twisted Fortune	Lil Toot	
2007	Fat Guy Stuck in Internet (TV)	Kazaa-a-a-a	
2007	Permanent Vacation	Stutter Boy	
2009	War Against the Weak	Himself	
2009	The Mercy Man	Stokes	
	Contact High	Blind Man	Austrian comedy
2011	Dream Job	Tito	
