= Asylum NYC =

Off-Broadway theater in Manhattan, New York

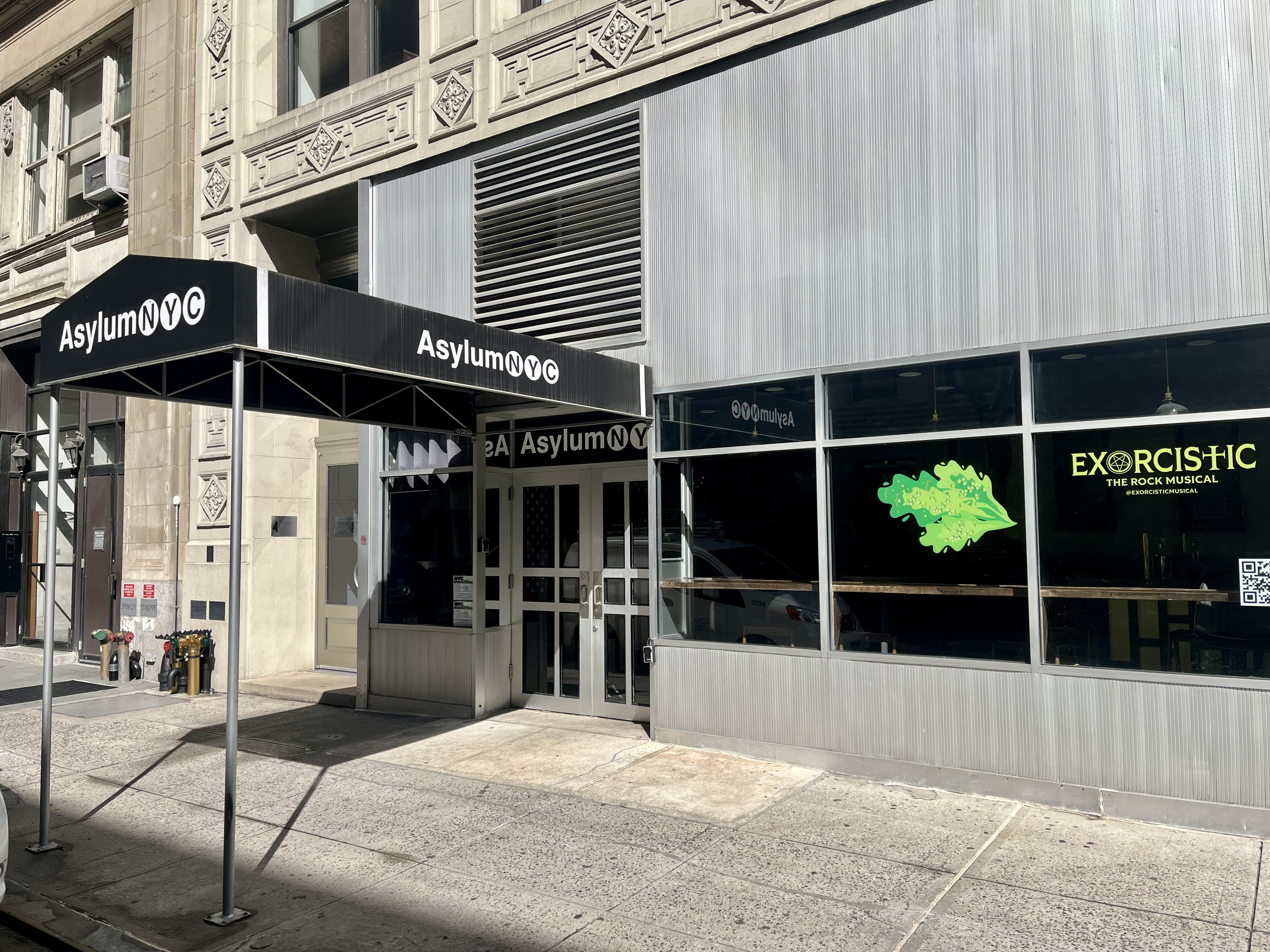
- The theater location on 24th Street in 2025
- Interactive map of Asylum NYC
- Address: 123 E 24th St; Manhattan, New York; United States
- Coordinates: 40.7406°N 73.9848°W

Construction
- Opened: 2017
- Reopened: 2023

Website
- asylumnyc.com

Asylum NYC (also called The Asylum Theatre) is a 150-seat off-Broadway theater and comedy venue at 123 East 24th Street in the Flatiron neighborhood of Manhattan, New York City, US. It is an offshoot of Boston's Improv Asylum, which was founded in 1998.

Asylum NYC opened in 2017 at its original location in the Chelsea neighborhood in Manhattan, the former location of the Upright Citizens Brigade theater. In 2022, the original location shut down, and, in 2023, it reopened in its current location.

In November 2026, it was announced that Asylum NYC will host the US debut of The Dark Room, an improvised game show created by Australian comedian John Robertson in 2012. The theatre is also the current home of the long-running Iron Mule Short Comedy Film Festival, hosted by actor and comedian Victor Varnado and director Jay Stern which has been running in various New York City theaters since 2002.

== Notable productions ==
Run Dates	Name	Refs.
June 23, 2022 – November 13, 2022	Titanique	
June 23, 2024 – March 30, 2025	Cellino v. Barnes	
August 25, 2025 – October 4, 2025	Exorcistic: The Rock Musical	
September 17, 2025 – October 12, 2025	Slam Frank: A New Musical	
