= James Breen =

James Breen may refer to:

- James Breen (politician) (1945–2026), Irish independent politician
- James Breen (astronomer) (1826–1866), Irish astronomer
- Jim Breen (born 1947), Australian professor in IT and telecommunications
