= Glenn Rockowitz =

American actor

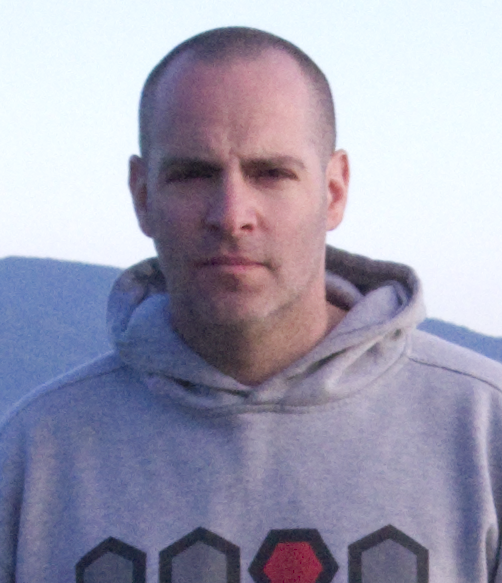
- Born: May 27, 1970 (age 56); Plainview, New York
- Education: University of Arizona
- Occupations: Comedian; writer; actor
- Notable work: Rodeo in Joliet (book) and Hacks (film)
- Television: Saturday Night Live (writer)

Glenn Rockowitz (born May 27, 1970) is an American writer, filmmaker, comedian and voice actor. He lives in Seattle, Washington.

== Education and early career ==
Rockowitz was born in Plainview, New York. Rockowitz spent the first eight years of his life in New York City (NYC). He left NYC to move to Phoenix, Arizona, where he graduated from Arcadia High School in 1988. During high school, he served as class president. He then attended the University of Arizona, in Tucson, and then performed with the Second City in Chicago. After Second City, Rockowitz worked as a stand-up comedian based in Boston and New York, traveling across the US. In 1994 he became a writer for NBC's Saturday Night Live.

== The Best Medicine Group ==
In 1995, he founded a nonprofit AIDS and cancer charity in NYC, known as The Best Medicine Group—an organization that brought live comedy shows into the homes of terminally-ill patients throughout the metropolitan New York area. In 2000, NY1 named Rockowitz the New Yorker of the Week for his efforts, five years after the organization was founded.

== Filmmaking ==
Rockowitz wrote and directed the cult independent film Hacks in 2002. The film garnered many festival awards including Best Comedy at the New York Film Festival, Best Picture at the Chicago Digital Film Festival, and Best Picture at the Orinda Film Festival outside of San Francisco. The film is a "tale, told mockumentary-style, of a handful of stand-up comedians plying their craft for a talent-poor talent agency ... [the film] points out the grim realities of the stand-up world when you're not quite ready for primetime, daytime or even remedial playtime". Comedians featured in the film include Jim Gaffigan, Michael Rispoli, and Victor Varnado.

== Books ==
Rodeo in Joliet, a memoir of his battle with a very aggressive late-stage cancer, was released nationally on April 11, 2009. By early 2010, the book became a national bestseller and was subsequently optioned by director Matt Aselton to become a major motion picture, written by Ryan Knighton for release in 2021. The story follows his diagnosis in 1998, when he was given three months to live at the age of 28, and the experimental treatment that led to his recovery.

Cotton Teeth, his newest book and companion memoir to Rodeo in Joliet, was released on December 14, 2021, and was named to Kirkus Reviews Best Books of 2021.

== Acting ==
Rockowitz has been the brand voice for Xbox since 2007, T-Mobile (for which he also wrote the ad copy) and Alaska Airlines. In addition, he has been the voice actor on commercials for WeatherTech, Expedia, BlackBerry, Quiznos, Scion, PetSmart, and the Seattle Seahawks.
