= Orpheum Theatre (Manhattan) =

Off-Broadway theater in Manhattan, New York

- Players Theatre; Orpheum Concert Garden; New Orpheum
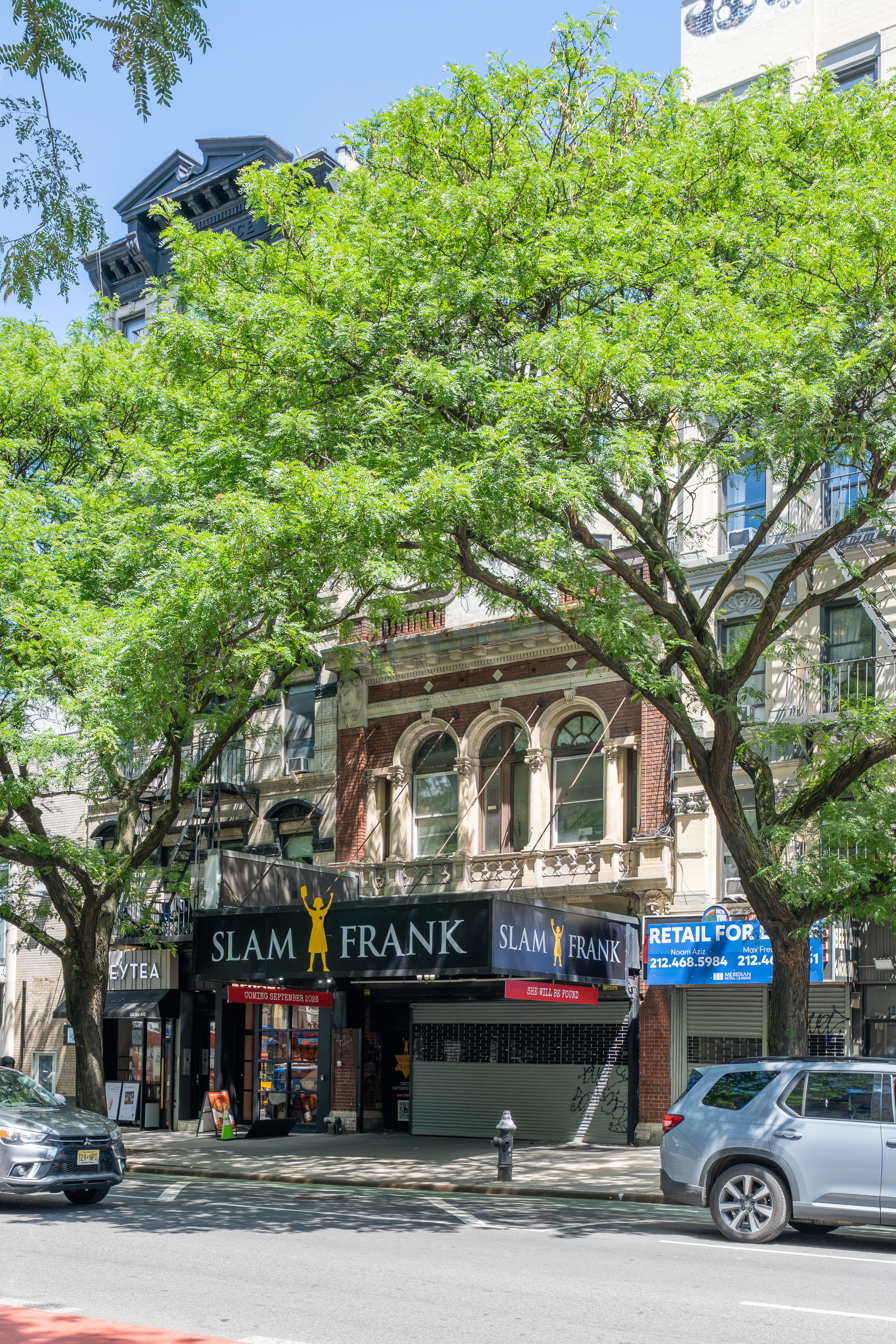
- (2026)
- Interactive map of Orpheum Theatre
- Address: 126 Second Avenue; New York City, New York; United States
- Coordinates: 40.728302°N 73.987684°W
- Owner: Liberty Theatres
- Capacity: 347

Construction
- Opened: 1904

The Orpheum Theatre, formerly Player's Theatre, is a 299-seat off-Broadway theatre on Second Avenue near the corner of St. Marks Place in the East Village neighborhood of lower Manhattan, New York City. The theatre is owned by Liberty Theatres, a subsidiary of Reading International, which also owns Minetta Lane Theatre.

There may have been a concert garden on the site as early as the 1880s, but there was a theatre there by 1904. During the heyday of Yiddish theatre in the Yiddish Theater District in Manhattan, the venue was the Player's Theatre, and was part of the "Jewish Rialto" along Second Avenue. By the 1920s, the theatre was exhibiting films, but was converted back to dramatic use in 1958, with the first production, Little Mary Sunshine, opening in November 1959.

Significant productions include the revival and revamping of Cole Porter's musical Anything Goes in 1962, Your Own Thing in 1968, The Me Nobody Knows in 1970, The Cocktail Party in 1980, Key Exchange in 1981, Broken Toys! in 1981, Little Shop of Horrors in 1982, Sandra Bernhard's Without You I'm Nothing in 1988, The Lady in Question in 1989, Eric Bogosian's Sex, Drugs, Rock & Roll in 1990, John Leguizamo's Mambo Mouth in 1991, and David Mamet's Oleanna in 1992. From 1994 to 2023 it was the home of the New York production of Stomp, with over 11,000 performances of the show having taken place there. After the theater briefly went dark, Slam Frank transferred there for its off-Broadway debut in September 2026.
