= Indo-Pacific Four =

South Korea, Japan, New Zealand, Australia

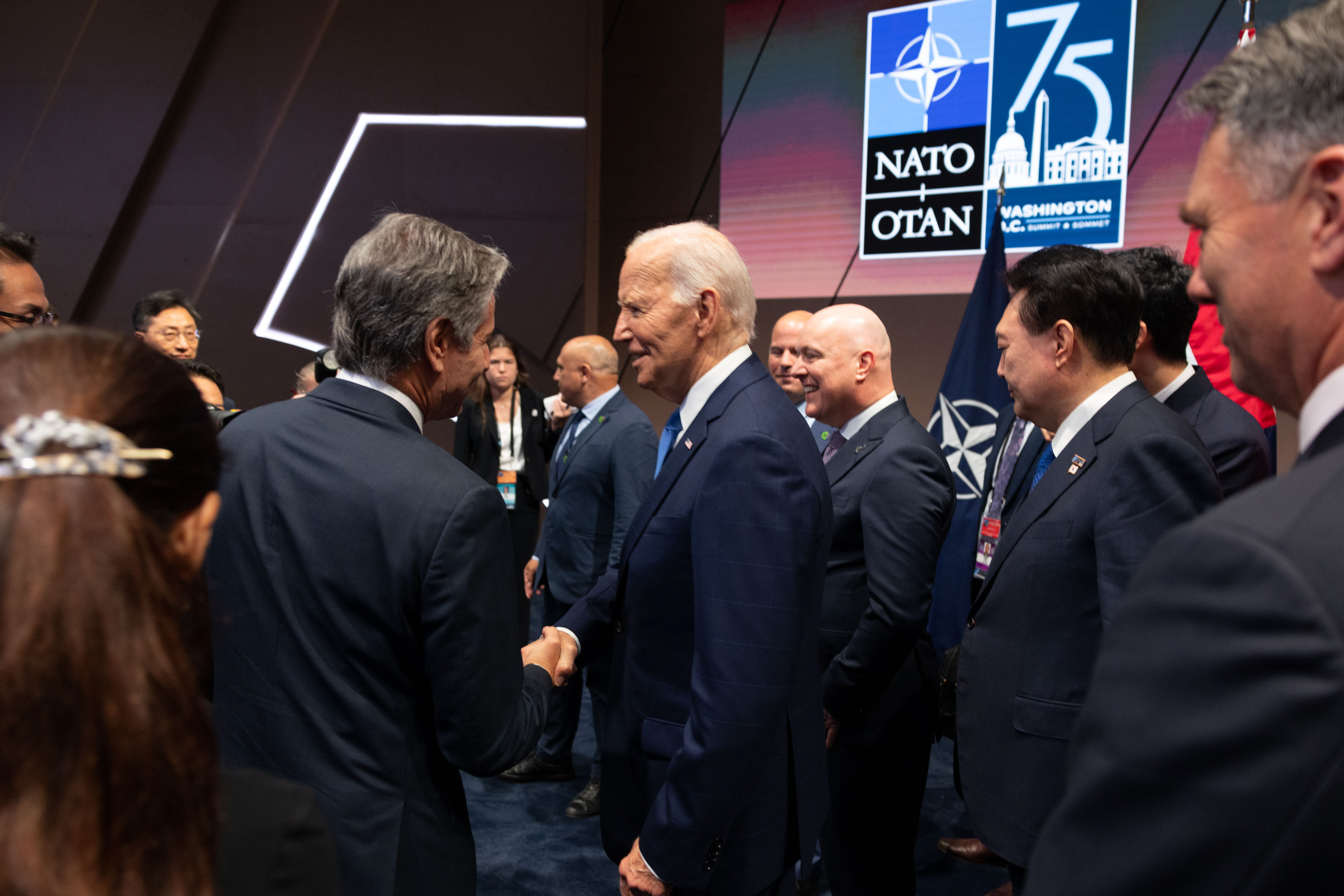
US Secretary of State Antony Blinken and President Biden attend an Indo-Pacific Four meeting at the 2024 NATO summit

The Indo-Pacific Four (IP4) are four NATO partners in the Asia–Pacific region: South Korea, Japan, New Zealand, and Australia. All four countries border the western Pacific Ocean: Japan and South Korea in East Asia, Australia and New Zealand in Australasia.

Amid a more volatile regional security landscape, experts have recently argued for stronger cooperation between the IP4 and both Europe and the US, with the goal of fostering a more stable Indo-Pacific region.
