= St Thomas' Church, Crookes =

Church in South Yorkshire, England

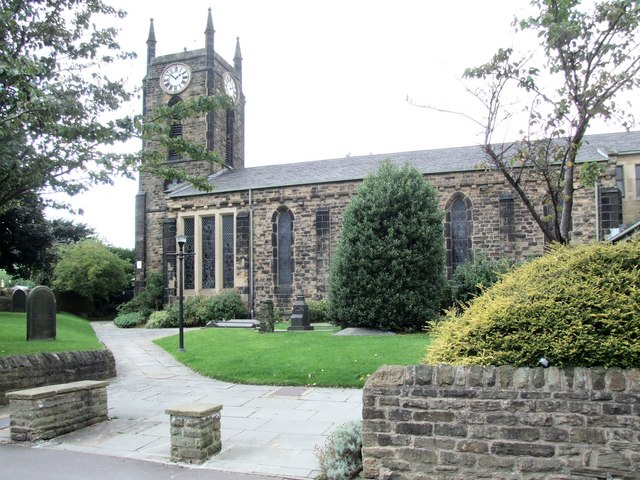
- St Thomas' Church, Crookes
- 53°22′57″N 1°30′27″W
- OS grid reference: SK 328 873
- Location: Nairn Street, Crookes, Sheffield, South Yorkshire, S10 1UL
- Country: England
- Denomination: Church of England and Baptist
- Churchmanship: Charismatic

History
- Dedication: St Thomas

Administration
- Province: Province of York
- Diocese: Diocese of Sheffield
- Archdeaconry: Archdeaconry of Sheffield and Rotherham
- Deanery: Hallam

Clergy
- Rector: The Revd T. J. Finnemore

St Thomas Church, Crookes — now known as 'STC Sheffield' — is an ecumenical church with united Anglican and Baptist traditions, in Crookes, Sheffield, England. STC Sheffield is a large evangelical Anglican and Baptist Church, situated in the west of Sheffield.

== The building ==
The building has undergone various building and ordering projects in the last 40 years. It still retains much of its original architecture, although a substantial expansion was made in the 1980s and a further extension was added in 2011 to join the building to the former Crookes Endowed School. The main church worship area is a classic Victorian church with a square tower and gothic arch stained glass windows.

== History and previous vicars ==
Previous vicars/rectors of note include Mike Breen and Mick Woodhead.

- 1840–1844 John Haigh
- 1845–1854 Francis Owen
- 1854–1855 Vacancy: services taken by Rev. Thomas Howarth
- 1855–1882 Charles G. Coombe
- 1882–1901 Constantine Clementson
- 1902–1916 Henry Martin
- 1916–1929 Norton Fleetwood Duncan
- 1930–1934 Cameron P. Newell
- 1934–1938 S. H. Maycock
- 1938–1942 L. J. Todd
- 1942–1950 J. S. Hepworth
- 1950–1956 W. J. Sawle
- 1957–1964 C. C. Jack Butlin
- 1964–1971 Michael J. Cole
- 1971–1992 Robert P. R. Warren
- 1992–2003 Mike Breen
- 2003–2021 Mick Woodhead
- 2022–present Tom Finnemore

St Thomas Crookes was founded in 1840 following an appeal to build a church for a growing rural population. The church and burial ground were consecrated on 1 October 1840 by the Archbishop of York.

In 1982 St Thomas Crookes joined with Crookes Baptist Church under a Local Ecumenical Partnership (LEP) which continues to the present day. The former Baptist church building was demolished and its site is now occupied by twelve self-contained flats for the elderly.

The Crookes Endowed School was built in 1790 and educated local children until 1981 when it closed due to falling rolls. The church purchased the building in 1981 and reopened it in 1982 after renovation.

St Thomas's Church was the site of the Nine O'Clock Service controversy during the 1980s–1990s, which grew to national prominence before being stopped following allegations of sexual and emotional abuse. In 1995, a number of complaints began to surface of the sexual abuse of women in the group by Chris Brain. After an investigation by the Diocese of Sheffield, the group was shut down in August 1995. The Bishop of Sheffield demanded Brain's resignation after he confessed to having sexual relationships with young women in the congregation. The services were shut down by the Church of England in 1994 after Chris Brain admitted to 'having sexual contact with more than 20 young female members of Nine O'Clock Service.'

Conservative Party MP, Miriam Cates, and her family were members of St Thomas' Church and she was the operations director of Network Church Sheffield from 2016 to 2018. Cates' husband developed a mobile app for foodbanks. The first client of the app was the S6 Foodbank, then based at St. Thomas' Philadelphia (Network Church Sheffield). Network Church Sheffield is independent from St Thomas Crookes, but has a close relationship with it. NCS consists of St Thomas' Philadelphia, Sheffield, and the King's Centre, Sheffield. St Thomas' Philadelphia was created (within the diocese of Sheffield) as an extension of St Thomas' Crookes, sharing clergy and other staff, when Rev Mike Breen was vicar (rector); but subsequently separated as regards staff, membership and finances. The S6 Foodbank was based at the Philadelphia site, but in 2025 relocated to larger premises in the east side of Sheffield.
