= Kelly Breen =

Kelly Breen may refer to:

- Kelly J. Breen (born 1969), American horse trainer
- Kelly Breen (politician) (born 1977), American state legislator from Michigan
