= Richard Breen (disambiguation) =

Richard L. Breen (1918–1967) was an American screenwriter and director.

Richard Breen may also refer to:

- Dick Breen (1935–2017), American sportscaster Dick Enberg
- Richard Abidin Breen (born 1979), English musical performer Abz Love
- Rick Breen, American motorcycle racer; see 2010 AMA Pro Supersport Championship
