= William Mattar =

American attorney

- Born: Amherst, New York, U.S.
- Education: State University of New York at Plattsburgh (B.A. in psychology); Syracuse University College of Law (J.D.)
- Occupation: Personal injury attorney
- Years active: 1990–present
- Organization: William Mattar Law Offices
- Known for: Founder of William Mattar Law Offices; "Hurt In A Car? Call William Mattar! 444-4444" slogan
- Website: Official website

William Mattar is an American personal injury attorney who is the founder of the eponymous law firm based in Buffalo, New York.

== Education ==
Mattar was born in Amherst, New York. He was active as a Boy Scout and became an Eagle Scout, later receiving a Silver Beaver Award. He attended SUNY Plattsburgh, graduating with a bachelor's degree in psychology in 1986. He then attended Syracuse University College of Law, graduating in 1988.

== William Mattar Law Offices ==
After working for another firm, Mattar opened his practice in 1990 in Williamsville, New York. The firm is known for its tagline, "Hurt In A Car? Call William Mattar!" and focuses on motor vehicle accidents. It continues to be headquartered in Williamsville while growing to become the largest motor vehicle accident firm in New York State, employing over 120 employees.

In 2014, the firm explored an expansion in Amherst, New York, and was controversially approved for $550,000 in tax breaks from the local Industrial Development Agency. It declined the incentives.

William Mattar runs an annual TV spot debut during the Super Bowl with unique takes while promoting their 'hurt in a car' slogan. In 2019, the ads shifted to showcasing Mattar's "personal side", and in 2020, featured his mother. A lifelong Buffalo sports fan, in 2024 Mattar went viral for warning against the dangerous and illegal fan ritual of "feeding the pit", climbing into the new stadium's construction site for good luck.

== Philanthropy ==
For over a decade, starting in 2000, Mattar was the president of the Village Preservation Foundation in his hometown of Amherst, New York.

On the 4th of July and St. Patrick's Day, his firm sponsors Uber rides home, for community safety, and also presents "Stuff the Bus" initiatives for local community families in need during back to school season.
