= Crookes =

Suburb of the city of Sheffield, South Yorkshire, England

- Location within Sheffield
- Population: 17,700 (2011 census)
- OS grid reference: SK328875
- Metropolitan borough: City of Sheffield
- Metropolitan county: South Yorkshire
- Region: Yorkshire and the Humber
- Country: England
- Sovereign state: United Kingdom
- Post town: SHEFFIELD
- Postcode district: S10
- Dialling code: 0114
- Police: South Yorkshire
- Fire: South Yorkshire
- Ambulance: Yorkshire
- UK Parliament: Sheffield Hallam

Crookes is a suburb of the City of Sheffield, England, about 1.5 miles (2.4 km) west of the city centre. It borders Broomhill to the south, Walkley and Upperthorpe to the east and open countryside around the River Rivelin to the north. The population of the ward of the same name was 17,700 at the 2011 Census.

== Etymology ==
The suburb is said to derive its name from the Old Norse "Krkor" which means a nook or corner of land.

== History ==
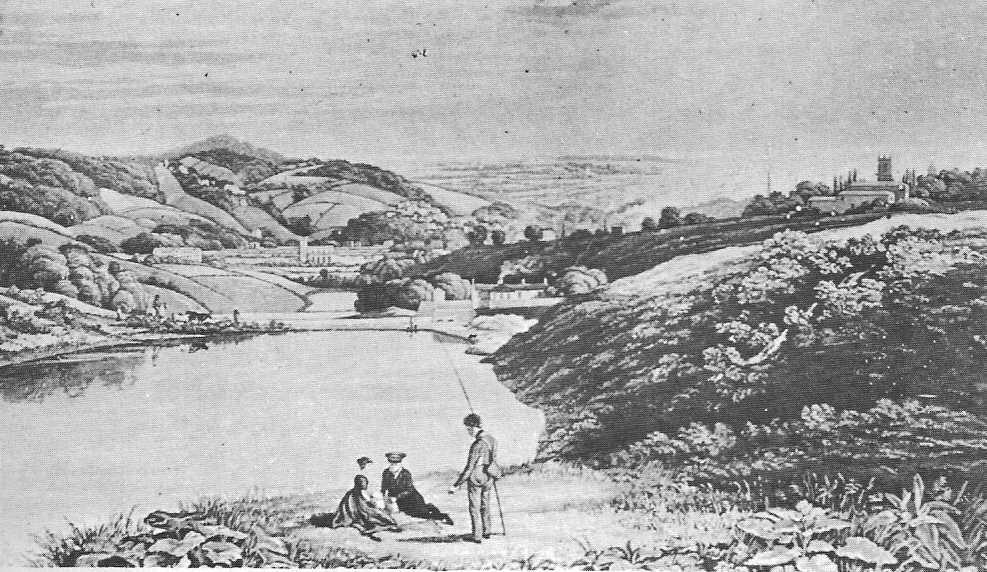
View from Crookes towards Upperthorpe in 1826.

Crookes lies near the course of a Roman road from Templeborough to Brough-on-Noe (now Lydgate Lane) and the main road is itself over 1,000 years old. Founded by the Vikings as 'Krkur' in 980AD, the area was recorded in Domesday Book in 1068 as "Crokkiss".

Crookes was a self-contained village from the 16th century until the end of the 19th century. This area was sparsely settled until the 1790s, when a turnpike road was opened from Sheffield to Glossop, running via the southern end of Crookes, spurring development of the area. Names of roads such as Truswell Road, Headland Road, and Headland Drive are references to the mediaeval open fields that survived in this area into the late 18th century. In the 19th century Crookes became a popular 'holiday' spot for residents of Sheffield to escape the soot and grime of the town due to its out-of-city location; in 1855 the Sheffield politician Thomas Asline Ward referred to the health benefits of Crookes' "country air".

The Bole Hills ( 53.390597°N 1.510491°W ) at Crookes, overlooking the Rivelin Valley to the north, were the site of open air smelting, and Bronze Age (about 1500 BC) funerary remains, similar to those of contemporary tribes sometimes called the Urn people, were found near this site in 1887. Sidney Addy reports the find in his 1888 book on the Sheffield area citing:

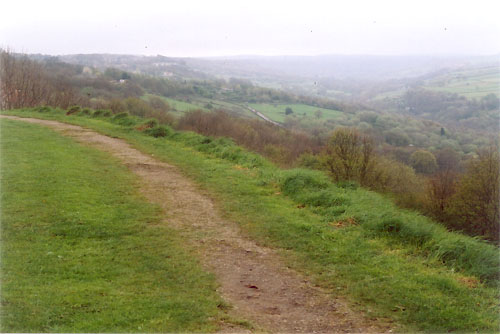
Bole Hills, Crookes, Sheffield (overlooking Rivelin Valley)

"On Easter Sunday [1887] Mr. Herbert T. Watkinson, of Summer Street, was walking in Cocked Hat Lane, (later to become Tinker Lane) near the Bole Hills, at Crookes, when he noticed in the side of an excavation that had been made for the foundations of some new houses what looked like a drain pipe. Closer examination revealed two rude earthenware urns, one inverted within the other, and the two containing a quantity of calcined bones, some broken fragments of a bronze spear-head or dagger, and a smaller urn pierced on one side with two round holes. The outer urn fell to pieces, but the one inverted within it was recovered whole. It is of a type very common in British burial mounds, and stands 9½ inches high, and measures across the mouth 7¼ inches, while the largest circumference is 26 inches. It is ornamented with the familiar straight and diagonal lines, and rows of dots. The urns lay six or eight inches below the surface, and were surrounded with charcoal. We are glad to hear that this curious relic of our ancient British ancestors will be exhibited in the Weston Park Museum."

The urn was discovered near St Anthony's Well, which was believed to have medicinal properties.

There have been several other archaeological finds in Crookes, including a Bronze Age arrowhead, a Roman coin and a prehistoric flint flake found in a front garden.

== Crookes today ==
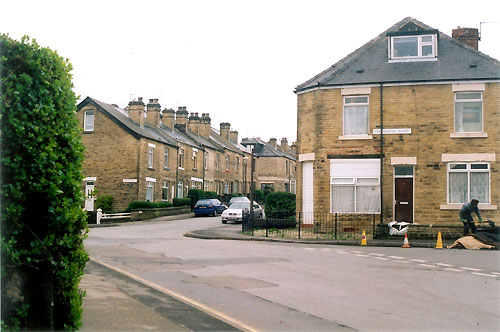
Mulehouse Road, Crookes, Sheffield

The centre of Crookes is focused on the main road, also named Crookes, which runs through the suburb before becoming Northfield Road at its north end. Crookes features the majority of the shops and businesses, which include a Co-op Food, a Sainsbury's Local and numerous small local stores. Crookes becomes Crookes Road at its southern end to connect with Broomhill. Another major road through the suburb is Commonside, located in the Crookesmoor part of the area, which is home to its own set of shops. Popular institutions in the area include St Thomas' church on Nairn Street and Crookes Social Club, located on Mulehouse Road and formerly known as Crookes Working Men's Club, which was established in 1926 and was a venue of Def Leppard who played there in 1979. There are 11 traditional pubs within the suburb, with a further 3 bars/micropubs.

Most of Crookes is part of the Crookes & Crosspool ward of Sheffield City Council, with Crookesmoor falling in the Broomhill and Sharrow Vale ward. Crookes & Crosspool is represented by two Labour Party and one Liberal Democrat councillor as of 2024, while Broomhill and Sharrow Vale is represented by 3 Green Party councillors.

A large number of students from the University of Sheffield live in the area. Indie pop band The Crookes are University of Sheffield alumni and named themselves after the suburb, their founding members Daniel Hopewell and Alex Saunders having lived in the area during their time as students there although ironically their members were later "priced out" of living in Crookes and relocated to the less expensive London Road area. One of the band's songs, 'The Crookes Laundry Murder 1922' is named after one of Crookes' most famous crimes.

The instrumental track "The Bus To Crookes" by The Human League was inspired by a bus journey to the area; in 2017 the song was voted the ninth best song about Sheffield by readers of the Sheffield Star.

At present, Crookes is served by the 52 and 52a buses, operated by First (52a) and Stagecoach (52), which runs from Woodhouse through Handsworth, Darnall, Attercliffe, City Centre and Broomhill to Crookes (52), Walkley and Hillsborough (52a).

== Notable people ==
Famous people from Crookes include singers Joe Cocker and Paul Carrack, Def Leppard members Joe Elliot and Rick Savage, as well as former Def Leppard member, and current resident Pete Willis, and television presenter Charlie Webster.

== See also ==
- Crookes Cemetery
