= Slam Frank =

2025 satire musical

- Music: Andrew Fox
- Lyrics: Andrew Fox
- Book: Joel Sinensky
- Premiere: September 17, 2025: Asylum NYC, New York

Slam Frank is a 2025 off-Broadway satirical hip-hop musical loosely based on the story of Anne Frank. It was created by Andrew Fox and Joel Sinensky after a Twitter thread about Anne Frank's "white privilege" went viral in 2022. The show is a show within a show of an ultra-progressive theatre troupe that reimagines Frank as a pansexual Latina named Anita Franco, along with Peter van Daan as a non-binary dancer. While the show itself is purportedly satirical, its viral social media promotion, with snippets of the show and tongue-in-cheek commentary, never acknowledges the satire.

Some editorials or op-eds from Jewish newspapers, written before the show's debut, criticized the show's "disrespectful" treatment of Anne Frank, and the show provoked a petition to stop its opening entirely.

In May 2026, a Slam Frank cast album became available on Bandcamp to those who had donated to the musical's official Kickstarter page, featuring vocals from the original 2025 Off-Broadway cast.

In June 2026, the producers announced that Slam Frank would return Off-Broadway at the Orpheum Theatre, with an opening night scheduled for September 11, 2026. Producers also stated that they hoped the engagement would lead to a future Broadway transfer.

== Synopsis ==
Slam Frank opens with an Artistic Director addressing the audience, explaining that they are attending the opening night of a small regional theatre company’s production. During the monologue, they deliver a confused land acknowledgement, praise the LGBT community, and announce that one actress quit during dress rehearsals, requiring an ensemble member to assume two roles. A montage of contemporary news clips and political memes plays and the show starts.

The Frank family goes into hiding from the Nazis in 1942, leading Margot to sing about feeling forced to hide, while Anita performs an energetic rap about documenting everything happening around her ("Write It All Out"). As the family settles into the attic, Edith instructs everyone how to behave in hiding. She chastises her husband Otto and rebukes Anita for attempting to assert a Latinx identity, saying she should model herself after Margot, who rarely speaks. The ghost of Anita’s abuela appears, urging her to write, leading Anita to begin journaling ("Immigrant Girl").

The Van Daan family, consisting of a misogynistic Mr. Van Daan, a submissive Mrs. Van Daan, and their son Peter, arrives. Anita expresses discomfort with Margot’s increasing Jewish religious observance and begins developing a romantic interest in Peter. Peter confides in Anita about his feminine side, while Edith, Otto, and Mrs. Van Daan lament their respective struggles against societal expectations as a Black woman, a neurodivergent person, and a woman ("Fighting Expectations").

As 1944 approaches, tensions rise over rationing and the cramped nature of the attic ("New Years, 1944"). Edith and Mr. Van Daan argue over authority in the attic, with Edith asserting that the men must contribute more labor. Mr. Van Daan delivers a monologue about feeling threatened as an insecure white man, and Edith responds with a piece of Black feminist slam poetry, likening the patriarchy to Jewish confinement in the attic ("Yeast of Edith").

Edith encourages Mrs. Van Daan to leave her husband and provides her with feminist literature. Mr. Van Daan mocks Anita’s diary writing, but Peter defends her. A radio broadcast announces that the Dutch government plans to publish firsthand wartime accounts, including diaries, inspiring Anita to revise her writing for publication ("Rewrite My Diary"). Edith and Otto inform Anita that publication would require suppressing her Latinx identity and ceasing to write in Spanish. After being told she must be white, Anita is visited again by her abuela's ghost ("Abuela's Warning"), whom she rejects, calling her "Grandma".

Mr. Van Daan confronts Mrs. Van Daan for reading feminist literature and Edith accuses him of being the source of the attic’s problems. Mr. Van Daan demands his wife leave with him but she refuses, performing a feminist anthem with Edith, and Anita celebrating women's liberation ("Herstory"). As Mr. Van Daan departs, he shares a moment with Otto lamenting that women cannot understand men as men understand each other. Otto misinterprets this interaction as romantic and attempts to kiss Mr. Van Daan.

Following Mr. Van Daan’s departure, Margot lights Shabbat candles and reads from the Torah, drawing puzzled reactions. Anita confides in Peter that she previously had no one to talk to, disregarding Margot, and admits she has largely forgotten about the Nazis, focusing instead on familial stress. With his father gone, Peter reveals that he is non-binary, prompting Anita to identify as pansexual ("Non-Binary"). Otto comes out as gay, Edith as asexual, and Mrs. Van Daan as having a fetish. As the others replace their Star of David badges with pronoun pins, Margot silently gathers the discarded stars.

Struggling to write, Anita is again visited by her abuela, who urges her to reconnect with her roots ("Rewrite My Diary Reprise, Part I"). A surreal sequence depicts Anita’s childhood in the barrios of Frankfurt, a CIA-backed coup bringing Nazis to power, her family’s journey through German jungles, assistance from an Indigenous, shamanic Moses figure, and her grandmother’s death ("Rewrite My Diary Reprise, Part II"). Anita resolves to write her diary in Spanish rather than "the colonizer language".

A radio announcement of the Allies nearing Amsterdam prompts reflection amongst the group ("Before Allies"). Everyone discusses post-war plans, with Anita advocating continued activism across causes while the rest pledge various acts of allyship ("Allies"). Margot finally speaks, proposing the creation of a safe space for people like them in Palestine ("Safe Space"). When Anita notes that people already live there, Margot dismisses the concern. They don black hats and exaggerated noses of antisemitic caricatures and sing about colonizing Palestine, extracting rent, conquering the Global South, and expanding empire. Margot urges Anita to remember her people.

Anita mourns that her family has become oppressors but reiterates her belief that people are good ("Anita’s Decision"). Concluding that Jews inherently occupy space that does not belong to them, she writes a letter revealing the attic’s location and throws it from the window. Nazis arrive and execute each resident as they assert their identities, leaving Anita and Margot last. Margot confronts Anita, who argues that every Jew sacrificed saves thousands of lives. Margot removes her microphone and exits the show.

Adolf Hitler appears from the audience, applauds, revives the cast, and announces that he has been inspired to transition into Adeleine Hitler and declares the Holocaust canceled. The attic residents express relief that they no longer need to confront Palestine. Hitler praises Anita for changing the world. The cast, excluding Margot, performs a final number, advocating an uncompromising pursuit of justice, including the suppression of dissent ("Justice"). They remove their costumes, piling their shoes onstage, and revealing shirts bearing activist slogans—some of which overlap with Nazi rhetoric—as a montage plays featuring diverse groups alongside footage of antisemitic attacks and the Nova music festival massacre.

== Principal cast/creative team ==
Original Off-Broadway cast
Character	Actor
Anita Franco	Olivia Bernábe
Peter	Alex Lewis
Mrs. Van Daan	Jaz Zepatos
Otto	Rocky Paterra
Margot / Abuela	Anya van Hoogstraten
Edith	Austen Horne
Mr. Van Daan / Artistic Director	John Anker Bow
Assistant Stage Manager	Walker Stovall

In June 2026, the production announced a revised cast for its planned fall 2026 engagement. The announcement indicated that the role of Margot/Abuela would be recast for the upcoming production. No further details regarding the personnel change were publicly disclosed by the producers. Amelia Louise Barr replaced Anya van Hoogstraten for the role of Margot/Abuela in the Ortheum Theatre run of the musical.

Original Off-Broadway creative team
Role	Name
Music & Lyrics	Andrew Fox
Book	Joel Sinensky
Director	Sam LaFrage
PSM	Nikita Chernin
Producer	Steven Brandon
Producer	Stage Time (PJ Adzima & Yuriy Pavlish)
Associate Director	Emily Abrams
Costume Designer	Sarah Lockwood
Choreographer	Nico DeJesus
Music Director	Alex Harrington
Set Design & Props	CJ Howard
Lighting/Video Designer	Zack Lobel
Marketing/PR	Katie Rosin, Kampfire Inc.

== Musical numbers ==
- "Write It All Out"
- "Immigrant Girl"
- "Fighting Expectations"
- "New Years, 1944"
- "Yeast of Edith"
- "Rewrite My Diary"
- "Abuela's Warning"
- "Herstory"
- "Non-Binary"
- "Rewrite My Diary Reprise, Part I"
- "Rewrite My Diary Reprise, Part II"
- "Before Allies"
- "Allies"
- "Safe Space" - Not included on the official cast album
- "Anita's Decision" - Not included on the official cast album
- "Justice"

== History ==
The show is based on a Twitter debate from 2022 regarding whether or not diarist and Holocaust victim Anne Frank had white privilege. The initial tweets were widely condemned by Jewish organizations. The show had a concert presentation on June 16, 2025 at Asylum NYC and began a fully-staged developmental run on September 17, 2025.

== Reception ==
Ben Brantley, former chief theater critic for The New York Times, said, "the already notorious little musical "Slam Frank" may be the most important new show around", in a post on X. Zachary Stewart writing for Theatermania called it, "A blistering satire of progressive, terminally online sensibilities" and "the edgiest musical playing in New York." Writing for The Times, Ben Kawaller described it as "skewer[ing] the absurdity of tribalism while championing our common humanity."

=== Controversy ===
On December 14, 2025, the Instagram account of the show posted a meme in response to the 2025 Bondi Beach shooting, using tongue-in-cheek revolutionary rhetoric echoing defenses for the Nova Massacre to facetiously defend the attack. It was quickly taken down. Two days later, the creator of the show, Andrew Fox, posted an apology on the account for the post being in bad taste. Fox also expressed his annoyance with people continuing to spread the screenshots on the basis that it was spreading more pain.
