= Mike Breen (pastor) =

British minister and author

- Born: 13 June 1958 (age 68)
- Occupations: Author, speaker, pastor
- Spouse: Sally Breen

Mike Breen (born 13 June 1958) is a former English church leader, minister, and author. He has previously led missional churches in both Europe and the United States.

== Biography ==
=== Early life ===
Breen recalls never having read a book at age 16, due to dyslexia. To enable him to partake in classroom discussions, his school teacher and returned missionary, Mrs. Dearmest, handed him a Living Bible to read. He states this is the first book he read in its entirety and credits it with changing his life.

=== Education and ministry ===
Breen holds a degree from Cranmer Hall, Durham, a Church of England theological college and is an ordained minister in the Church of England. He started out as a curate in Cambridge in 1984. From 1987, he served as parish priest in Brixton in the inner city of London — "Brixton is like south-central Los-Angeles in many ways". During his time in Brixton, Breen pioneered missional communities as a ministry model.

The Breen family lived in Little Rock, Arkansas from 1991 to 1994.

In 1994, Breen moved to Sheffield, following Robert Warren as senior rector of St Thomas' Church, Crookes, an Anglican-Baptist local ecumenical partnership. As team leader, Breen led St Thomas' to become England's largest church by attendance by the turn of the decade.

While at St Thomas', Breen began The Order of Mission, a Protestant, Charismatic and Evangelical monastic order. As vicar, Breen became the order's "Senior Guardian of The Order of Mission" (TOM). In July 2024, Breen was "removed as a member of the Order of Mission", following Apex Church's independent investigation that led to Mike Breen's resignation as a Pastor of that church in January 2024. The Church of England are in the process of completing a 'learning process' into Mike Breen's leadership of the Order of Mission, led by regional and national safeguarding professionals.

In 2004, Breen moved to Glendale, Arizona, to serve as a pastor of the Community Church of Joy and taught at Fuller Theological Seminary in Pasadena, California.

In 2006, the Leadership Network approached Breen to lead an initiative into church planting. The European Church Planting Network was established in 2007 with Breen as a senior leader. The ECPN Leadership Community gathered church leaders from all over Europe, with a stated goal of seeing 500 new churches planted across Eastern and Western Europe by the end of 2011. The result of 1,137 significantly exceeded this goal.

From 2008 to 2014, Breen lived at Pawleys Island, South Carolina, where he served as the leader for 3D Movements, an "organic movement of biblical discipleship and missional church" helping established churches and church planters move into a discipling and missional way of being church. 3DM decentralized in 2014, with Jo Saxton eventually becoming Chair of the Board as of June 2018. Breen moved to Greenville, South Carolina, and began working on his PhD at Trinity Evangelical Divinity School. Breen continued writing for 3DM Publishing, releasing updated editions of Building a Discipling Culture and Family on Mission (with his wife Sally), among others.

In January 2014 Breen spoke in a leadership event to the multi-thousand member North Heights Lutheran Church, which sparked concerns leading to the April 2014 decision of the elder board to remove 3DM completely from the church and publish at length the reasons for their decision. Among those reasons attributed to 3DM were that, "worship attendance has dropped off dramatically," and a corresponding drop in giving. Other churches experienced success through 3DM partnerships, for example Billabong Uniting Church in Western Australia.

=== Controversy ===
In January 2024, the Board of 3DMovements, the non-profit organization that Mike Breen left in 2014, published an update on their website stating that the Board of APEX Church in Dayton, Ohio had discovered that Mike Breen had been conducting a sexual affair with a vulnerable member of APEX church for some time. This was independently investigated, and upheld. The investigation also revealed Breen's bullying and intimidating behaviour, and his reluctance to seek reconciliation. Faced with these findings, Mike Breen resigned from leadership of this church.

=== Marriage and children ===
Breen is married to Sally Breen. The couple have three children.

== Bibliography ==
- Brierley, Peter (2000). The tide is running out : what the English Church Attendance Survey reveals. London: Christian Research. ISBN 1-85321-137-0.
- Gibbs, Eddie; Bolger, Ryan K. (2005). Emerging churches : creating Christian community in postmodern cultures. Grand Rapids, Mich: Baker Academic. ISBN 0-8010-2715-2.
- McNair Scott, Benjamin G. (2014). Apostles Today: Making Sense of Contemporary Charismatic Apostolates: A Historical and Theological Appraisal. Cascade, OR: Wipf and Stock Publishers. ISBN 9781630872922.
- Percy, Martyn (2005). Engaging with contemporary culture Christianity, theology, and the concrete church. Aldershot: Ashgate. ISBN 0-7546-3259-8.
- Mike Breen. "Mike Breen and 3DM". Mike Breen.
- ECPN. "European Church Planting Network". Leadership Network. Archived from the original on 6 March 2012.

== See also ==
- Missional Community
- St Thomas' Church, Crookes
