= Michael Breen =

Michael Breen may refer to:

- Michael Breen (author) (born 1963), English author and journalist
- Michael Breen (hurler) (born 1994), Irish hurler
- Michael Breen (musician) (born 1960), Canadian musician
- Mike Breen (born 1961), American play-by-play sports commentator
- Mike Breen (pastor) (born 1958), English church leader
- Mike Breen (Gaelic footballer) (born 1998), Irish Gaelic footballer
