= James Breen (astronomer) =

- Born: 5 July 1826; Armagh
- Died: 25 August 1866 (aged 40)
- Resting place: Nunhead
- Awards: Fellow of the Royal Astronomical Society
- Scientific career
- Fields: Astronomy
- Institutions: Cambridge Observatory

James Breen (5 July 1826 – 25 August 1866) was an Irish astronomer.

Breen was the second son of Hugh Breen, senior (1791-1848), who superintended the lunar reductions at the Royal Observatory, Greenwich. He was born at Armagh, in Ireland, 5 July 1826, was engaged at the age of sixteen as a calculator at Greenwich, and exchanged the post for that of assistant in the Cambridge Observatory in August 1846.

In 1854 he published The Planetary Worlds: the Topography and Telescopic Appearance of the Sun, Planets, Moon, and Comets, a useful little work suggested by discussions on the plurality of worlds, showing considerable acquaintance with the history of the subject, as well as the practical familiarity conferred by the use of one of the finest refractors then in existence.

After twelve years' zealous cooperation with James Challis, he resigned his appointment towards the close of 1858, and cultivated literature in Paris until 1860, when he went to Spain, and observed the total solar eclipse of July 18, 1860 at Camuesa, with Messrs. Wray and Buckingham of the Himalaya expedition.

In the following year, after some months in Switzerland, he settled in London, and devoted himself to literary and linguistic studies, reading much at the British Museum, and contributing regularly, but for the most part anonymously, to the Popular Science Review and other periodicals. He had made arrangements for the publication of a work on stars, nebulae, and clusters, of which two sheets were already printed, when his strength finally gave way before the ravages of slow consumption.

He died at noon, 25 August 1866, aged 40, and was buried with his father at Nunhead. He had been elected a fellow of the Royal Astronomical Society on 10 June 1862. Extracts from his observations at Cambridge 1851-8 appeared in the Astronomische Nachrichten and Monthly Notices. He calculated the orbit of the double star ξ Ursæ Majoris, assigning it a period of 63.14 years, as well as those of Petersen's third (1850) and Brorsen's (1851, iii.) comets. His observations of Comet Donati with the Northumberland Equatorial were printed in the 'Memoirs of the R. A. Soc.' xxx. 68.
