= Matthew Breen =

Matthew Breen may refer to:

- Matthew Breen (journalist), American journalist and entertainment writer
- Matthew Breen (tennis) (born 1976), retired Australian professional tennis player
- Matthew Breen, musician in Emanuel (band)
