= Bolehill Recreation Ground =

Open space in Sheffield, England

Coordinates: 53.3899°N 1.5090°W

Bolehill Recreation Ground, known locally as The Bole Hills is a public open space in the suburb of Crookes within the City of Sheffield, England. The grounds are administered by Sheffield City Council's Parks and Countryside Service and are classed as a district park, one of 20 throughout the city. They are spread over an area of approximately 12 hectares (30 acres), consisting of a mixture of heathland, scrub and woodland and have been designated as a Local Wildlife Site. There are also several public amenities such as a children's playground, tennis courts, bowling greens and hut and a BMX track. The grounds stand at height of around 200 metres (660 feet) and offer good views to the north and west over the Loxley and Rivelin valleys.

== History ==
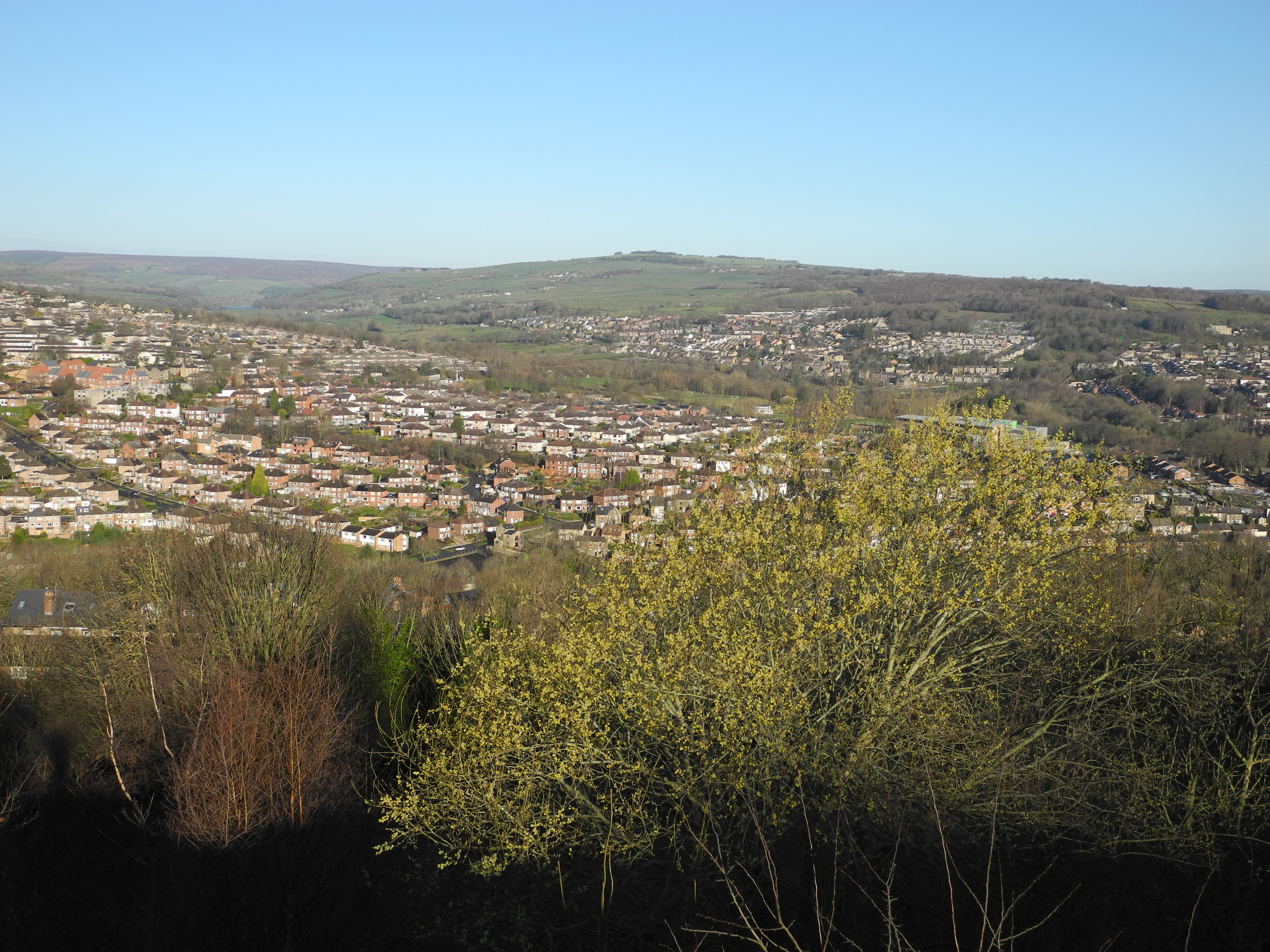
View north west from the Bole Hills Recreation Ground in Crookes, Sheffield, England.

The Bole Hills were originally a clearing in the dense forest which covered the area to the west of Sheffield and were used for grazing cattle and sheep. Because of its elevated position, which produces high winds as the westerlies are funnelled over the steep ground, the area was used as a bole hill for iron ore smelting and charcoal burning, with the high winds giving the blast to raise the temperature needed in the process. Open furnaces were driven into the hillsides and outlets dug to let out the smoke; these furnaces used the surrounding woodland for fuel. Smelting using the primitive bole hill method died out at the end of the 16th century, but it left a legacy of giving the area its name. The Bole Hills then became known for sandstone quarrying, the 1850 OS map shows the area with one large quarry and several smaller ones. The large quarry was owned by the Andrews company, while one of the smaller ones was owned Mr. Unwin, who lived in Cocked Hat Cottages at the top of Tinker Lane.

By 1890 the main Bole Hills quarry had reached large proportions, nearly a quarter of a mile long and 200 yards wide as it provided stone for the growing housing suburbs of Walkley and Broomhill. In September 1899 the Bole Hills area came into the possession of Sheffield Corporation as the quarrying of the area came to an end, and in 1904 they were proposing that it be used as a landfill site. Although there was some local opposition the site was used as a municipal landfill site over many years to fill in the quarry workings before being levelled off in the 1950s. The industrial past and landfill history of The Bole Hills has probably saved it from being built on, as it is hemmed in on all four sides by housing.

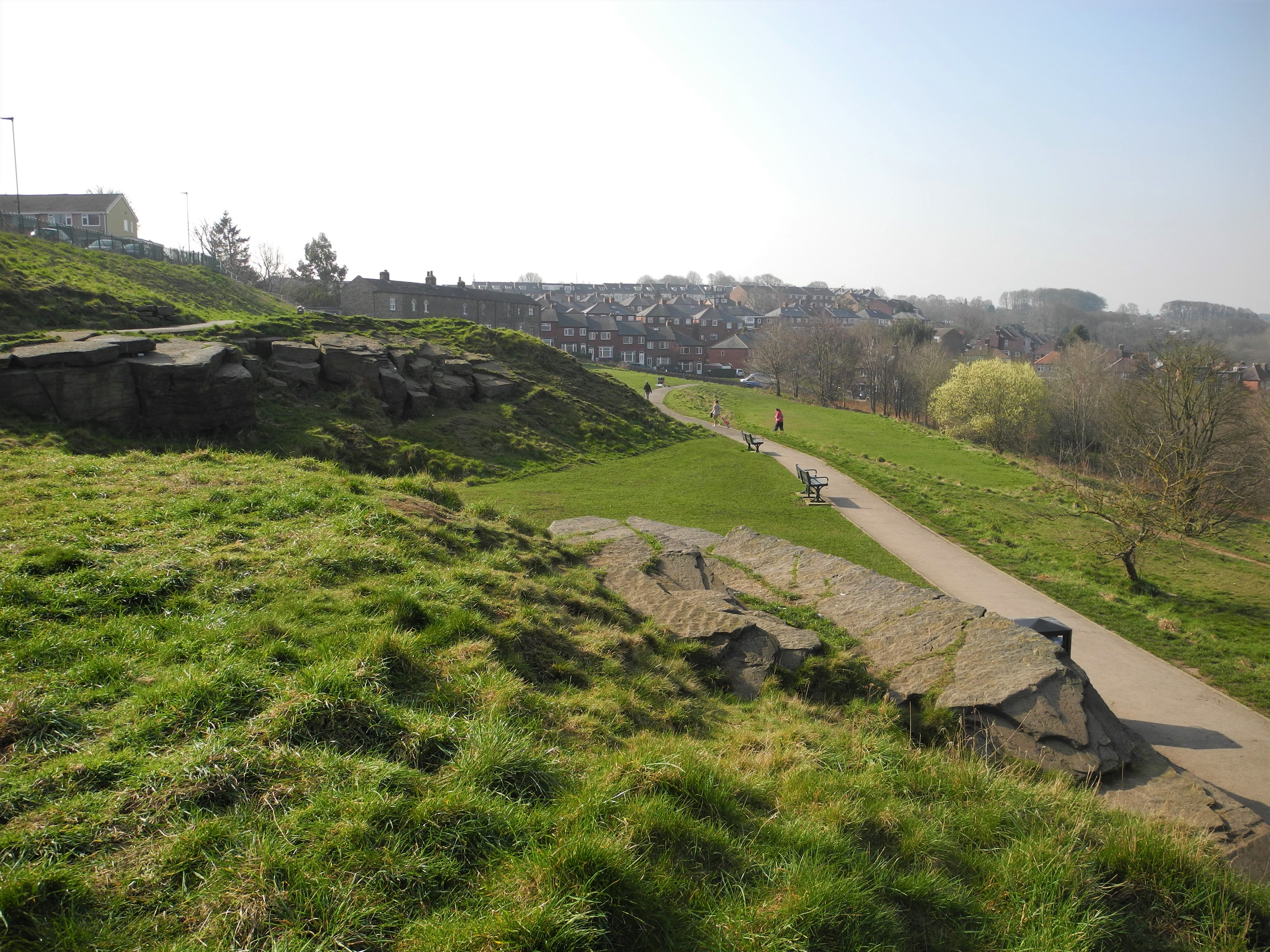
Looking south along the upper part of the Bole hills towards Crookes.

In 1904, an Iron Church was built on the crest of the Bole Hills, at what is now the end of Loxley View Road. This was the temporary place of worship for the newly created Crookes parish and was used until St. Timothy's Anglican church was opened on Slinn Street in 1911. The iron church was moved and used as the church hall to the new building, and a stone pulpit was built on the spot where it had stood on the Bole Hills. This was pulled down in 1958.

== The Area Today ==
Today the Bole Hills Recreation Ground is divided into two distinct parts; the southern (upper) part is adjacent to the suburb of Crookes and is heavily used by its inhabitants. Its amenities consists of surfaced paths for walkers, an open field, bowling greens, tennis courts and the children's playground. The open field also serves as the home ground of Sheffield Hallamshire Rugby Union Club. This upper part is also where the fine viewpoint for north west Sheffield is situated. The Bole Hill Quarry allotments are 15 plots of land which are rented out by Sheffield City Council to the general public for non-commercial gardening. They are situated between the football pitch and Moorsyde Avenue, the plots are over subscribed and there is a substantial waiting list. The southern (lower) area above Bole Hill Road consists mostly of woodland and scrub crisscrossed by rough paths. Bole Hill Wood covers an area of 4.22 hectares and is made of mixed deciduous trees. The southern area has a football pitch and a BMX cycle track. Sheffield City Council have proposed additional woodland planting in recent years and the area between the football pitch and the BMX track has been proposed.

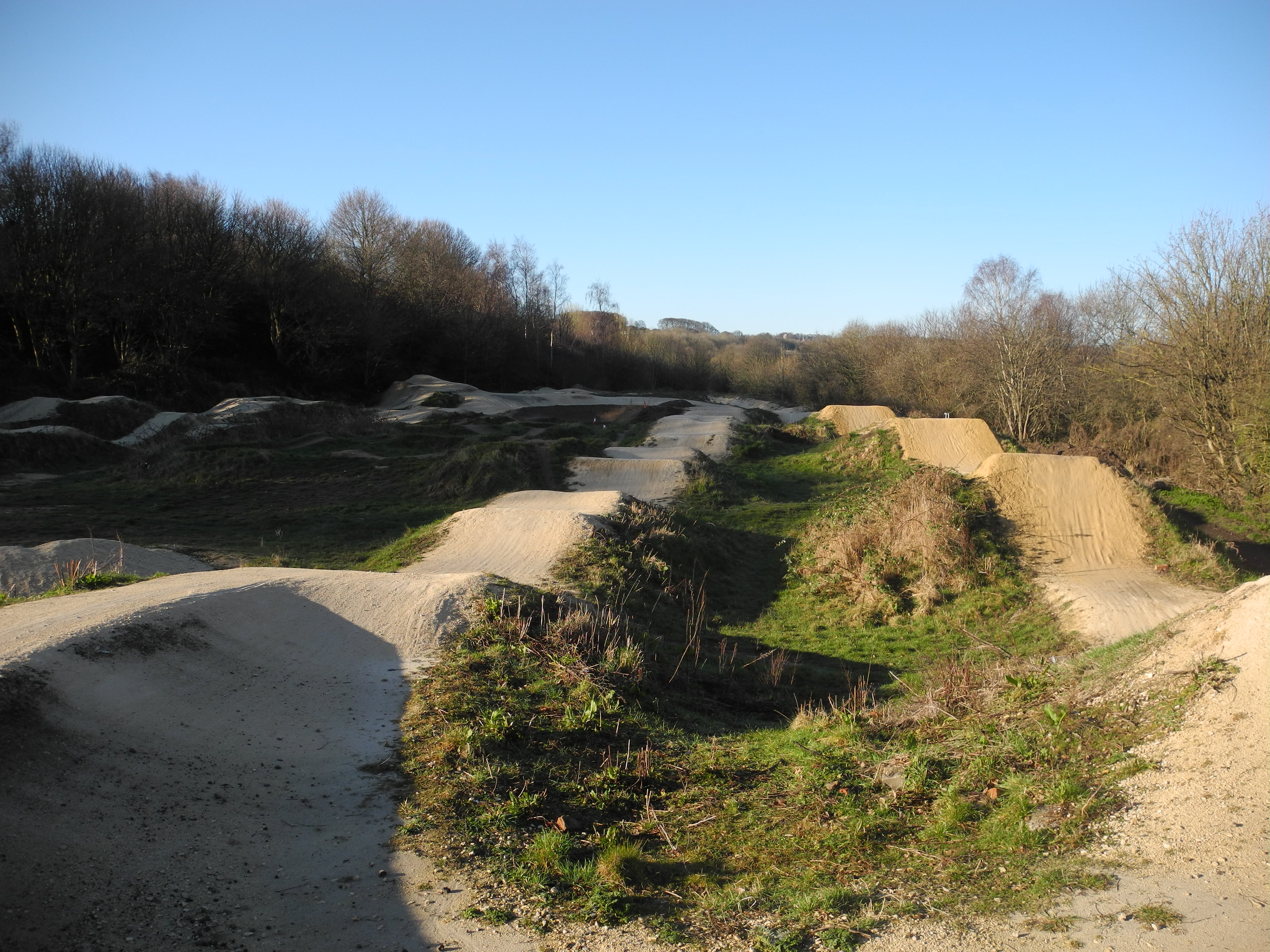
The BMX track

=== BMX Track ===
The BMX track was built in 1983 and was one of approximately 20 that were constructed across Sheffield at the time. The Bole Hill track is one of the few that has survived as it was adopted by a group of enthusiasts who kept the track up to standard and made improvements. The track has been redesigned several times over the years and was resurfaced in 2015 and resurfaced further times throughout the coming years. In 2022 - 2023 the track underwent a major design change, with the layout of the track changing and the jumps being made bigger. The track is now home to the Sheffield Dirt Society.
