= Claire Breen =

Human rights law academic

- Title: Professor (Law)

Academic background
- Education: University of Nottingham
- Thesis: The standard of the best interests of the child as a tradition of Western inconsistencies (1999)

Academic work
- Main interests: Children's rights law, international human rights

Claire M. Breen is a New Zealand law academic, and as of 2021 is a full professor at the University of Waikato. Her work focuses on children's legal rights, international human rights and international peace and security.

== Academic career ==
Breen has a Bachelor of Civil Law from University College Cork, and an LLM (International Law) from the University of Nottingham. After a PhD titled The standard of the best interests of the child as a tradition of Western inconsistencies at the University of Nottingham in 1999, Breen moved to the University of Waikato, rising to full professor in 2019.

Breen's research focuses on the rights of the child, and in particular how 'a more inclusive understanding' of children can create a better legal framework for law and policy. She has published two influential monographs on child rights, The Standard of the Best Interests of the Child (Martinus Nijhoff, 2003) and Age Discrimination and Children’s Rights (Martinus Nijhoff, 2006), and another on socio-economic influences on international peace, Economic and Social Rights and the Maintenance of International Peace and Security (Routledge, 2017). Breen and colleague Alexander Gillespie published a history of New Zealand law in 2022.

Recent articles by Breen cover a range of issues, including how New Zealand should deal with the return of an alleged ISIS terrorist to New Zealand, with reference to the rights of the two children involved, access to beaches for some disabled people, and how the ACC system discriminates against women by not covering birth injuries.

== Selected works ==
- Alexander Gillespie; Claire Breen (2021). "The Security Intelligence Agencies in New Zealand: evolution, challenges and progress". Intelligence and National Security: 1–20. doi:10.1080/02684527.2021.1901409. Wikidata Q106668480.
- Claire Breen (2012). "The Edges of Extraterritorial Jurisdiction: The Integration of Economic, Social and Cultural Rights into Peace Support Operations". Journal of International Peacekeeping. 16 (1–2): 47–83. doi:10.1163/187541111x613588. Wikidata Q106668482.
- C. Breen (2008). "The Policy of Direct Provision in Ireland: A Violation of Asylum Seekers' Right to an Adequate Standard of Housing". International Journal of Refugee Law. 20 (4): 611–636. doi:10.1093/ijrl/een037. Wikidata Q106668483.
- C. Breen (2007). "The Necessity of a Role for the ECOSOC in the Maintenance of International Peace and Security". Journal of Conflict and Security Law. 12 (2): 261–294. doi:10.1093/jcsl/krm012. Wikidata Q106668484.
- Claire Breen (2007). "When is a child not a child? Child soldiers in international law". Human Rights Review. 8 (2): 71–103. doi:10.1007/bf02881667. Wikidata Q106668485.
- Claire Breen (2005), Rationalising the Work of UN Human Rights Bodies or Reducing the Input of NGOs? The Changing Role of Human Rights NGOs at the United Nations, vol. 5, pp. 101–126, doi:10.1163/1571807054764186, Wikidata Q106668486
- Claire Breen (2004). "Protecting the Rights of the Non-Offending Child in Ireland: Balancing State Rights with State Obligations". The International Journal of Children's Rights. 12 (4): 379–400. doi:10.1163/1571818043603616. Wikidata Q106668487.
- C. Breen (2003). "Refugee Law in Ireland: Disregarding the Rights of the Child-Citizen, Discriminating against the Rights of the Child". International Journal of Refugee Law. 15 (4): 750–785. doi:10.1093/ijrl/15.4.750. Wikidata Q106668488.
- Claire Breen (2003). "The Right to Education of Persons with Disabilities: Disabled in Interpretation and Application". Netherlands Quarterly of Human Rights. 21 (1): 7–37. doi:10.1177/016934410302100102. Wikidata Q106668490.
