= Edward D. Breen =

American business executive

Edward D. Breen (born c. 1956) is an American business executive. He is the executive chairman of DuPont. Prior to this, he was the chair of the board and CEO of DuPont, a role he started on November 9, 2015. He is also a director of Comcast. Prior to his role at DuPont, Breen was the chairman and CEO of Tyco International.

The Wall Street Journal called Breen a "breakup expert" at the time he took the position as DuPont's CEO. It was believed at the time that he would increase the chances of the company's breakup, a distinct possibility since Trian Fund Management, DuPont's fifth largest shareholder at the time, was demanding the breakup of the company.

In March 2016, it was reported that Dow Chemical Co. and the DuPont Co. agreed to pay $27 million to DuPont CEO Edward Breen if he left the company by early 2017.

In February 2020, Breen was reinstated as DuPont CEO replacing Marc Doyle.

Breen is an alumnus of Grove City College and is the chair of their Board of Trustees.

== Recognition ==
In December, 2018 he received the Leadership Award for Historic Corporate Reinvention from the Chemical Marketing and Economics group of the American Chemical Society’s New York Section. He was honored for the merger he put into place between Dow Chemical Co. and E.I. du Pont de Nemours & Co. He was also named one of the 100 Most Influential People in Business Ethics by Ethisphere.
