= First Baptist Church of Wheaton =

Coordinates: 41.878013°N 88.108227°W

First Baptist Wheaton
- First Baptist Church of Wheaton
- First Baptist Wheaton
- Location: 1310 N. Main St., Wheaton, IL 60187
- Country: United States
- Denomination: Independent Baptist
- Website: www.firstbaptistwheaton.com

History
- Founded: 1864

First Baptist Wheaton is an evangelical Christian church located in Wheaton, Illinois, situated in southern DuPage County, and is not formally related to any denomination or baptist association. The church was founded in 1864 by 20 pioneers around the time Abraham Lincoln was drafting his Gettysburg Address. Weekly church attendance averages nearly 600. In July 2018, the church merged with Highpoint Church and is now known as Highpoint Church-Wheaton Campus.
