= Church attendance =

Core practice in Christian denominations

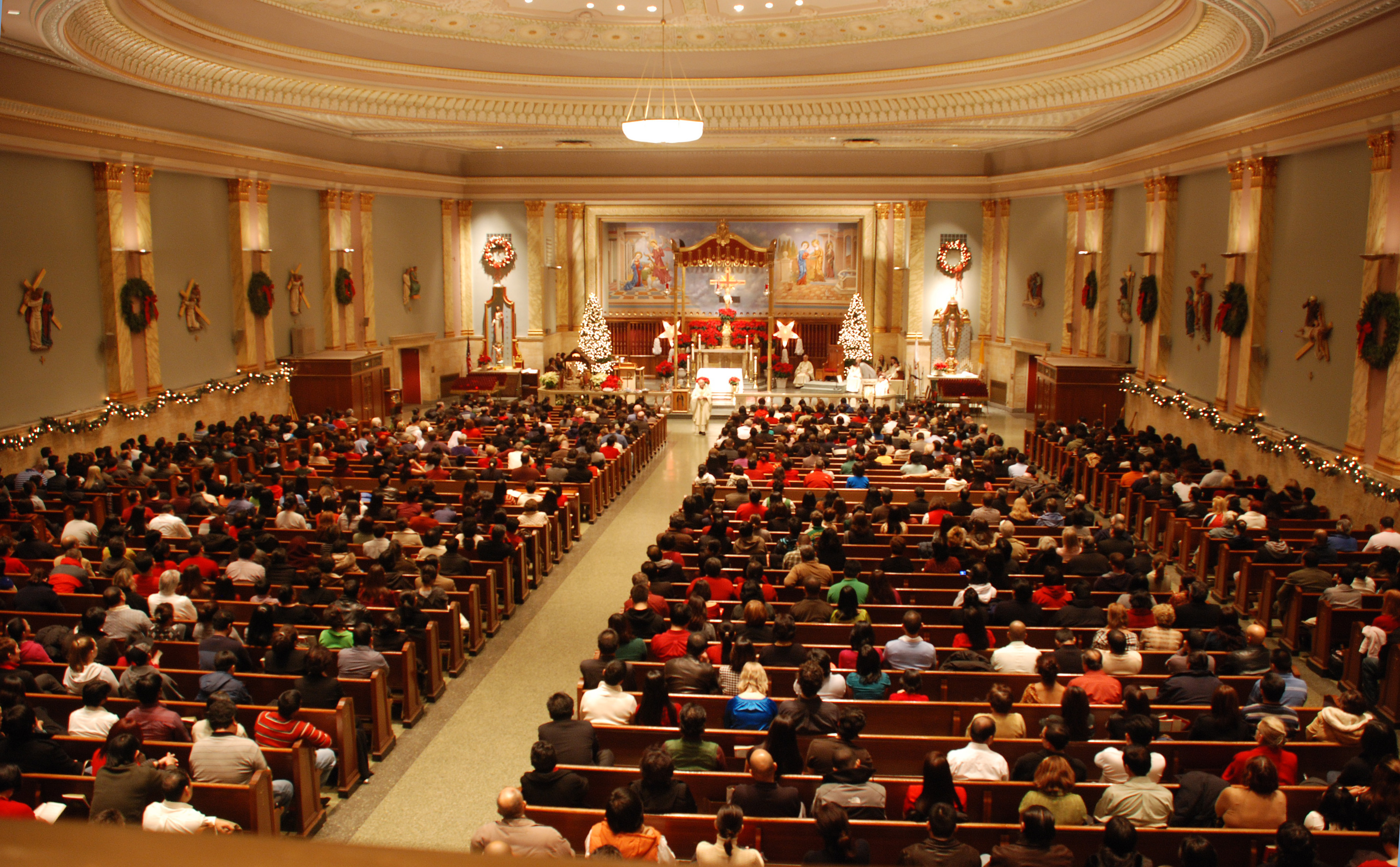
Many Christians attend church services on Christmas Eve, the Christian vigil that celebrates the birth of Jesus Christ.

Church attendance is a central religious practice for many Christians; some Christian denominations require church attendance on the Lord's Day (Sunday).

In addition to being based upon the spirit of the Ten Commandments ("Remember the Sabbath day, to keep it holy"), the importance of church attendance in Christian theology is delineated in Hebrews 10:25, which implores the believers: "Let us not neglect our church meetings, as some people do, but encourage and warn each other, especially now that the day of his coming back again is drawing near." Certain early Christian saints emphasized the necessity of church attendance for the continuance of the faith, such as John Climacus, who declared that "a sure sign of the deadening of the soul is the avoidance of church services." The Lutheran theologian Balthasar Münter stated that church attendance is the "foundation for the Christian life" as "the Christian Bible and the sacraments provide the framework for the faith"; he also states that it is important for believers because it aids in the prevention of backsliding, as well as offers "the company of other believers". The Catholic Church teaches that on Sundays and other holy days of obligation, the faithful are required to attend Mass. The Westminster Confession of Faith held by many Reformed Churches teaches first-day (Sunday) Sabbatarianism and the duty of church attendance on this day. Similarly, Methodist Church also requires attending "the public worship of God".

Certain Christian countries prescribe church attendance in their civil laws. In Lutheran Scandinavia (particularly in Sweden and Finland), the Kyrkogångsplikt was the legal obligation for citizens to attend Mass on the Lord's Day. Until 1791, it was a legal requirement in the Kingdom of Great Britain to attend services of the Church of England (the state church) at least twice a year.

In 2015, about two-thirds of Latin American Christians and 90% of African Christians in Ghana, Nigeria, Rwanda and Zimbabwe said they attended church regularly. Pew Research Center showed that South Africa in 2018 had 55% of Christians who attend church regularly. The same year another study by Pew, identified that Christians in Africa and Latin America and the United States have high levels of commitment to their faith, and it is somewhat more common in Central and Eastern Europe, while 15 Western European countries had a median of 22% monthly attendance for self-identified Christians. Prior, data from the European Social Survey in 2012 had shown that around a third of European Christians said they attend services once a month or more. The Economist reported that church attendance increased amongst young people in America—especially young Republican men—while Christian self-identification has steadied across the Western world. These findings of attendance amongst youth were contested, as the data showed younger generations remain the least likely to attend or identify compared to prior generations. In 2025 a significant percentage of US churches were experiencing attendance declines, but other American congregations of equal number saw increases, which lead to an overall, but uneven gain in church attendance.

The Gallup International, a self-reporting survey conducted via telephone, indicates that 37% of Americans report that they attend religious services weekly or near-weekly in 2013. The Pew Research Center stated, however, that there is a "sharp increase in church attendance around the two most significant Christian holidays, Christmas and Easter". As such, on Christmas (a holy day of obligation in the Catholic Church, a Festival in the Lutheran Churches and a Principal Feast in the Anglican Communion), LifeWay Research found that "six out of 10 Americans typically attend church".

According to Athena Magazine, former countries that held to a policy of state atheism actively discouraged church attendance and church membership, often persecuting Christians who continued to worship.

== Theology ==
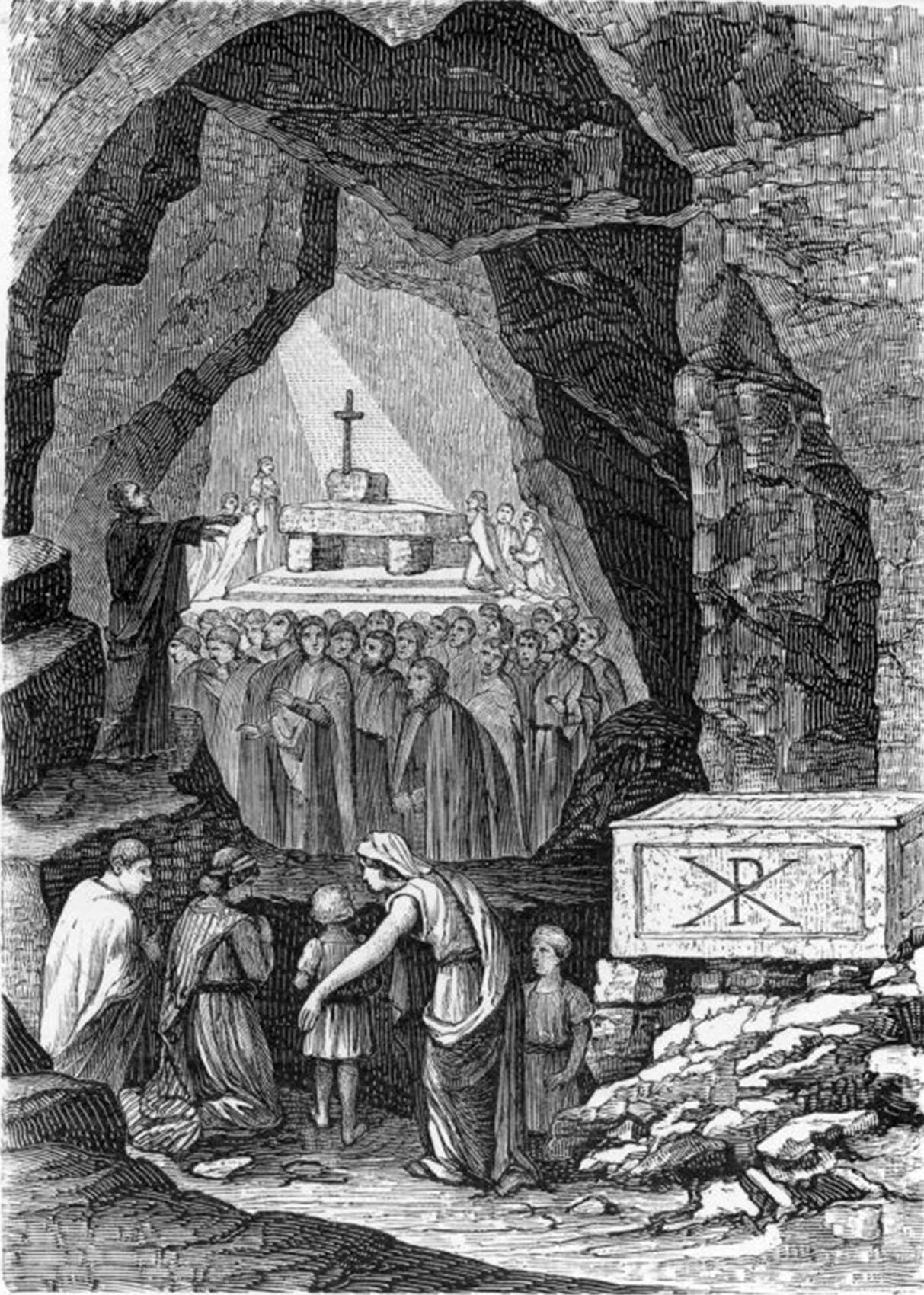
Depiction of early Christian worship in the Catacomb of Callixtus

The holding of church services pertains to the observance of the Lord's Day in Christianity. The Bible has a precedent for a pattern of morning and evening worship that has given rise to Sunday morning and Sunday evening services of worship held in the churches of many Christian denominations today, a "structure to help families sanctify the Lord’s Day." In Numbers 28:1–10 and Exodus 29:38–39, "God commanded the daily offerings in the tabernacle to be made once in the morning and then again at twilight". In Psalm 92, which is a prayer concerning the observance of the Sabbath, the prophet David writes "It is good to give thanks to the Lord, to sing praises to your name, O Most High; to declare your steadfast love in the morning, and your faithfulness by night" (cf. Psalm 134:1). Church father Eusebius of Caesarea thus declared: "For it is surely no small sign of God’s power that throughout the whole world in the churches of God at the morning rising of the sun and at the evening hours, hymns, praises, and truly divine delights are offered to God. God’s delights are indeed the hymns sent up everywhere on earth in his Church at the times of morning and evening." The early Christians attended two liturgies on the Lord's Day, worshipping communally in both a morning service and evening service, with the purpose of reading the Scriptures and celebrating the Eucharist. Throughout the rest of the week, Christians assembled at the church every day for morning prayer (which became known as lauds) and evening prayer (which became known as vespers), while praying at the other fixed prayer times privately; Christian monastics came to gather together to corporately pray all of the seven canonical hours communally.

In addition to being based upon the spirit of the Ten Commandments (which includes the injunction to "Remember the sabbath day, to keep it holy"), the importance of church attendance in Christian theology is delineated in Hebrews 10:25, which implores the believers: "Let us not neglect our church meetings, as some people do, but encourage and warn each other, especially now that the day of his coming back again is drawing near." Among Sunday Sabbatarians (First-day Sabbatarians), observance of the Lord's Day often takes the form of attending the Sunday morning service of worship, receiving catechesis through Sunday School, performing acts of mercy (such as evangelism, visiting prisoners in jails and seeing the sick at hospitals), and attending the Sunday evening service of worship, as well as refraining from Sunday shopping, servile work, playing sports, viewing the television, and dining at restaurants.

The majority of Christian denominations hold church services on the Lord's Day (with many offering Sunday morning and Sunday evening services); a number of traditions have mid-week Wednesday evening services as well. (Note: The majority of Christian denominations teach that Sunday is the Lord's Day on which all the faithful must assemble to offer worship to God (cf. first-day Sabbatarianism). A minority of Christian denominations that follow seventh-day Sabbatarianism organize worship on Saturdays.) In some Christian denominations, church services are held daily, with these including those in which the canonical hours are prayed, as well as the offering of the Mass, among other forms of worship. In addition to this, many Christians attend services of worship on holy days such as Christmas, Ash Wednesday, Good Friday, Ascension Thursday, among others depending on the Christian denomination.

== Statistics ==
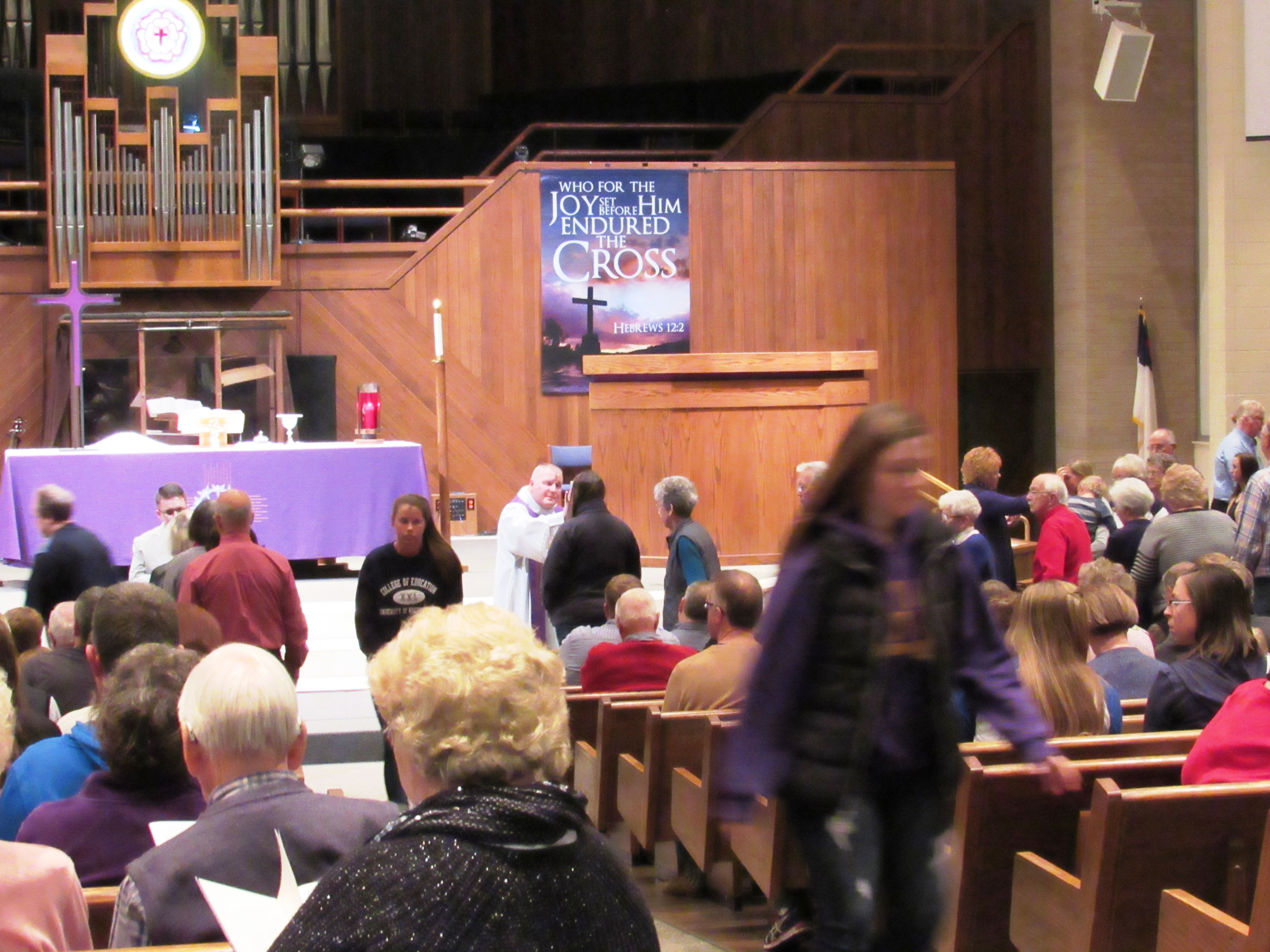
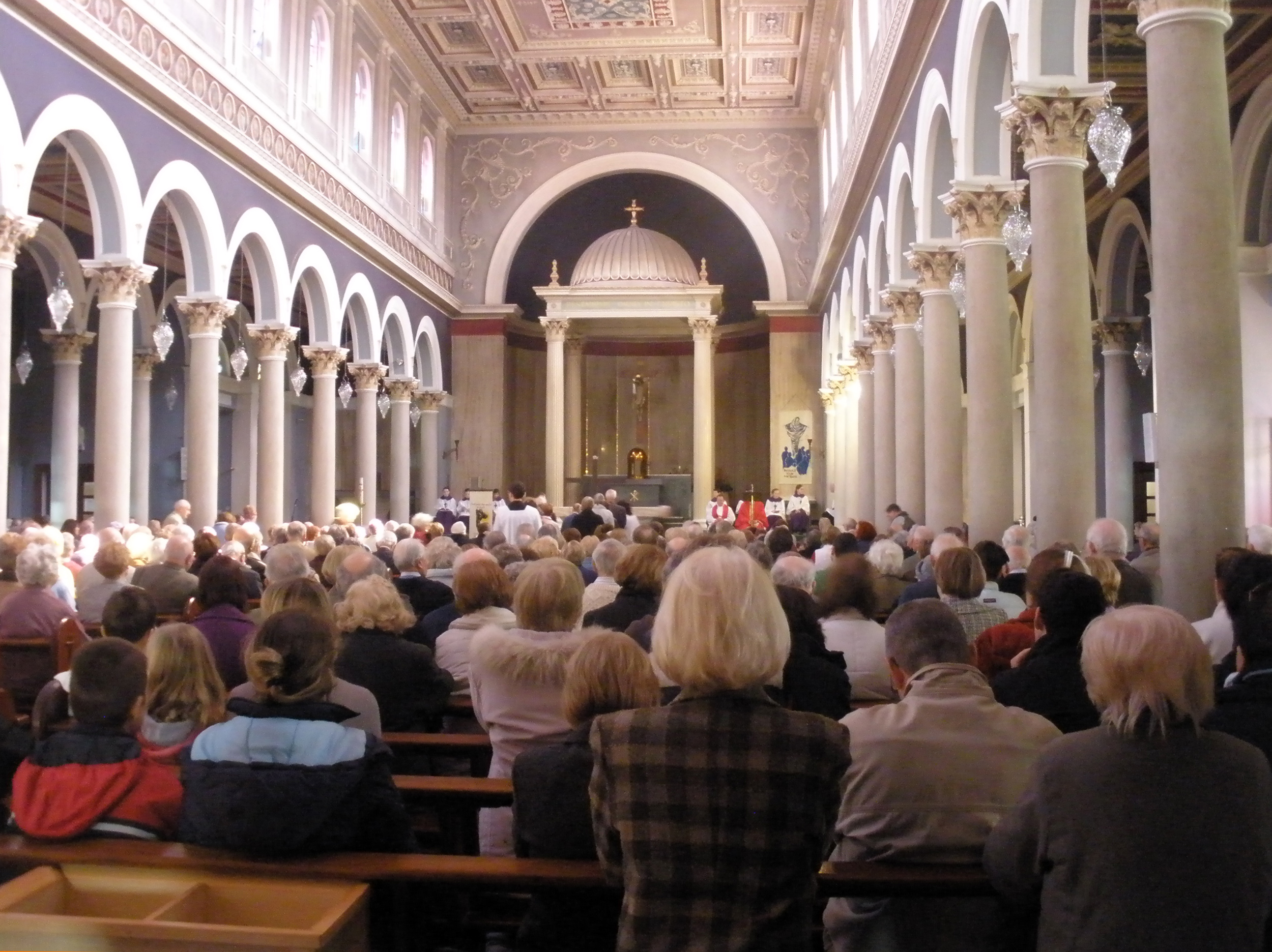
Ash Wednesday and Good Friday are two days within the Christian penitential season of Lent that are popular days for churchgoing. The image on the left depicts an Evangelical Lutheran Mass on Ash Wednesday while the image on the right depicts a Roman Catholic Good Friday service.

The Gallup International, a self-reporting survey conducted via telephone, indicates that 37% of Americans report that they attend religious services weekly or near-weekly in 2013. Self-reporting surveys conducted online indicate substantially lower weekly attendance rates, and methods of measurement that do not rely on self-reporting estimate even lower rates; for instance, a 2005 study published in the Journal for the Scientific Study of Religion found that just 22% of Americans attend services weekly. This compares to other countries' claims such as 15% of French citizens, 10% of British citizens, 8.8% of Australian citizens and 5.6% of Dutch citizens. In the U.K., in 2011, an average once-a-week attendance in Anglican churches went down by 0.3% compared with 2012, thus exhibiting a stabilizing trend. Previously, starting from 2000, an average rate of weekly church attendance in Britain was dropping down 1% annually. In 2013, the Pew Research Center reported that 37% of all Americans attended church on a weekly basis. In its turn, Gallup estimated the once-a-week church attendance of the Americans in 2013 as 39%.

Based on 1990–1991 data, it was estimated that the country with the highest rate of church attendance in the world was Nigeria (89%) and with the lowest—Soviet Russia (2%). Nigeria's data was notable, as Nigeria is very religiously diverse—the population is 50.1% Muslim and 48.2% Christian. The state authorities in the USSR, which dissolved in 1991, discouraged church construction; they had a hostile relationship with traditional organized religions and instead promoted Marxist-Leninist ideology, which espoused state atheism. A survey commissioned by the Época Magazine in 2005 showed that 29% of Brazilians attend church weekly, and indicated that it is lesser than in the United States but higher than in Western Europe and Japan, indeed showing that contrary to the local popular belief, Brazilians of the time could indeed be regarded as a religious people even in practice (though it is ponderable that the growth of the population declaring to be solely irreligious in nationwide censuses grew about 100% between 2000 and 2010, and 200% between 2000 and 2013, from 4% to 12%, and general secularization also grew among the portion of the population that remained religious).

A 2006 Financial Times (FT)/Harris Poll conducted online surveyed 12,507 adults over 16 years old in the United States (2,010 U.S. adults were surveyed) and five European countries (France, Italy, Germany, Great Britain and Spain). The survey found that only 26% of those polled attended religious services "every week or more often", 9% went "once or twice a month", 21% went "a few times a year", 3% went "once a year", 22% went "less than once a year", and 18% never attend religious services. Harris Interactive stated that the magnitude of errors cannot be estimated due to sampling errors and non-response bias. A previous nearly identical survey by Harris in 2003 found that only 26% of those surveyed attended religious services "every week or more often", 11% went "once or twice a month" 19% went "a few times a year", 4% went "once a year", 16% went "less than once a year", and 25% never attend religious services.

Calculating the church's average weekend attendance is important since it determines the size of a given church. For example, in the U.S., an average weekend attendance of more than 2,000 people separates a mega church from a large church, and an average weekend attendance between 51 and 300 people defines the large church; while a small church is the church with an attendance lower than 50 people. (Alternative definitions, such as house church, simple church, intentional community, were proposed by the Barna Group, an American private consulting firm). A narrow definition of a regular church attendee can be viewed as a synonym for a Sunday service visitation, while a broad definition, names as a regular attendee a person who comes to church during three out of eight weekends.

=== Attendance by country ===
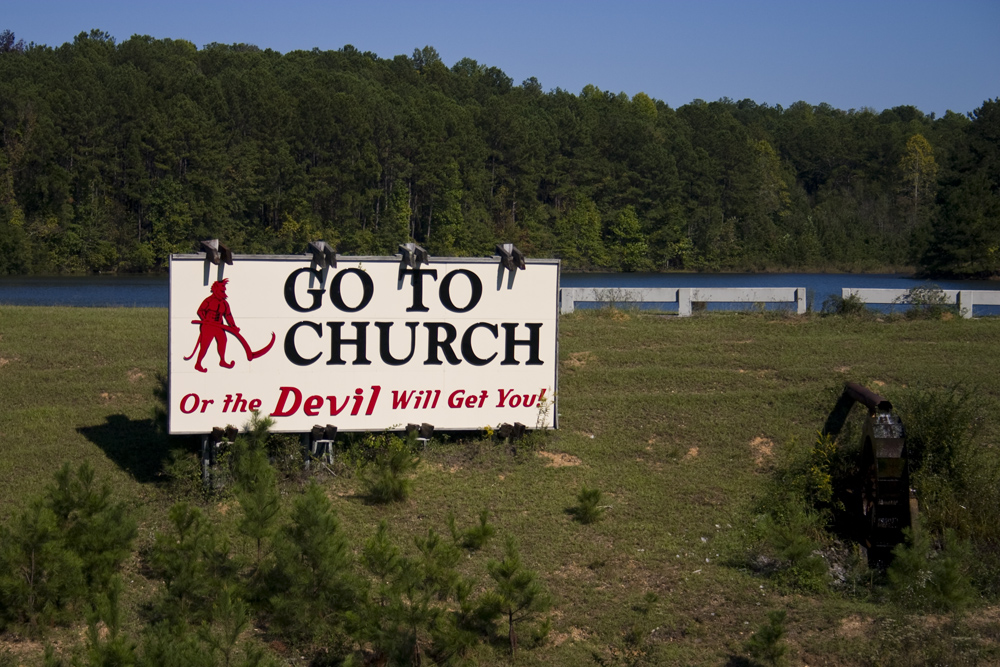
A billboard near the center of Alabama

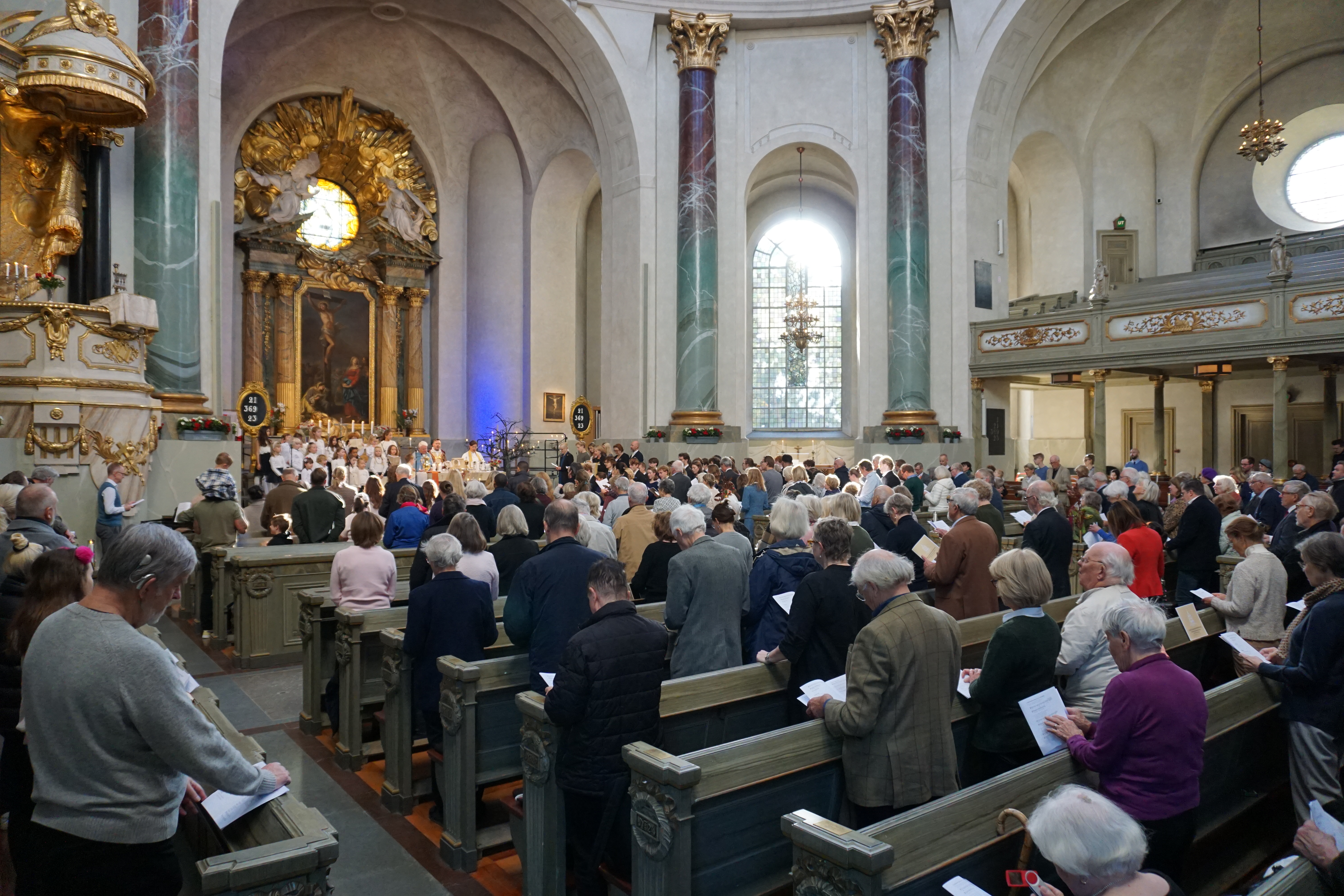
The celebration of the Mass in Hedvig Eleonora Evangelical-Lutheran Church, part of the Diocese of Stockholm in the Church of Sweden

The frequency with which Christians attend church services varies greatly around the world. In some countries weekly attendance at religious services is common among Christians, while in others weekly attendance is rare. The following attendance statistics are mostly based on self-reporting surveys and may not accurately reflect real attendance figures.

Percentage of Christians who attend church at least once a week
Country	Percentage
Indonesia (2018)	91.8%
Nigeria (2009)	89%
Zambia (2009)	85%
Haiti (2008–2009)	85%
Tanzania (2008–2009)	83%
Central African Republic (2009)	83%
Ghana (2009)	83%
Liberia (2009)	82%
Mozambique (2009)	81%
Uganda (2009)	81%
Kenya (2008)	80%
Ethiopia (2009)	78%
Cameroon (2009)	76%
Guatemala (2013–2014)	74%
Democratic Republic of the Congo (2009)	72%
Rwanda (2008)	70%
Guinea-Bissau (2009)	66%
Jamaica (2009)	66%
Honduras (2014)	64%
Botswana (2008–2009)	62%
El Salvador (2013)	61%
South Africa (2008)	60%
Nicaragua (2013)	55%
Costa Rica (2013)	51%
Colombia (2013–2014)	50%
Japan (2017)	50%
Dominican Republic (2013–2014)	48%
Panama (2013–2014)	48%
Puerto Rico (2013–2014)	47%
Brazil (2013–2014)	45%
Mexico (2013–2014)	45%
Bolivia (2013–2014)	41%
Venezuela (2017)	41%
Ecuador (2013–2014)	38%
Israel (2014–2015)	38%
Malta (2017)	36.1%
Peru (2013)	35%
Paraguay (2013–2014)	32%
Ireland (2017)	32%
Poland (2025)	30%
United States (2025)	26%
Slovenia (2009)	26%
Bosnia and Herzegovina (2017)	24%
Croatia (2017)	24%
Romania (2017)	24%
Cyprus (2013)	22%
Spain (2019)	21.5%
Portugal (2011)	19%
Chile (2014)	19%
Argentina (2019)	17.4%
Greece (2017)	17%
Georgia (2017)	17%
Ukraine (2017)	16%
Italy (2024)	15.8%
Armenia (2017)	15%
Moldova (2017)	15%
Belarus (2017)	15%
New Zealand (2008)	15%
Uruguay (2014)	13%
Netherlands (2022)	13%
Canada (2019)	11%
Hungary (2017)	9%
Bulgaria (2017)	9%
Lithuania (2017)	9%
Switzerland (2026)	8%
Serbia (2017)	7%
Austria (2017)	7%
Czech Republic (2017)	7%
Germany (2026)	6.8%
Latvia (2017)	6%
Sweden (2016)	5%
United Kingdom (2015)	5%
Norway (2011)	5%
Cuba (2012)	5%
Finland (2004)	5%
Belgium (2010)	5%
Australia (2025)	4.6%
Denmark (2015)	3%
Russia (2012)	3%
Estonia (2017)	2%

The following church attendance statistics are taken from the 2004 Gallup report, based on self-reporting telephone surveys. However, it is unclear whether the survey was solely of Christians in the respective country or the entire population (including non-Christians).

Country	Year	Attendance (%)
Austria	2004	18%
Cyprus	2004	22%
Denmark	2004	3%
Czech Republic	2004	11%
Estonia	2004	4%
Finland	2004	5%
Greece	2004	27%
Hungary	2004	12%
Ireland	2004	54%
Italy	2004	31%
Latvia	2004	7%
Lithuania	2004	14%
Malta	2004	74%
Norway	2002	3%
Poland	2004	63%
Portugal	2004	29%
Slovakia	2004	33%
Slovenia	2004	18%
Spain	2004	21%
Sweden	2004	5%

A study by the European Social Survey conducted in 2008 found these rates of respondents never attending religious service (excluding special occasions):

Respondents never attending religious services
Percentage	Countries
<10%	Cyprus, Greece, Poland, Bosnia-Herzegovina
10–20%	Croatia, Italy, Ukraine
20–30%	Turkey, Portugal, Russia
30–40%	Estonia, Germany, Sweden
40–50%	Israel, Spain, Netherlands
50–60%	Belgium, United Kingdom, France
>60%	Czech Republic

=== Attendance by U.S. state ===
The frequency by which adults attend church services also vary on a state-by-state basis in the United States.

Percentage of adults who attend church at least once a week (2014):
State	Percentage
Alabama	55%
Utah	53%
Tennessee	51%
Mississippi	49%
South Carolina	47%
West Virginia	46%
Louisiana	46%
Virginia	44%
Oklahoma	43%
Georgia	42%
Texas	42%
Arkansas	41%
Nebraska	39%
Kentucky	39%
North Carolina	39%
Washington, D.C.	39%
Wyoming	38%
Ohio	38%
Indiana	37%
Kansas	37%
Missouri	37%
Rhode Island	36%
Iowa	36%
South Dakota	36%
New Mexico	36%
Idaho	35%
Florida	35%
New Jersey	35%
Delaware	34%
Pennsylvania	34%
Minnesota	34%
Arizona	34%
Illinois	34%
Michigan	33%
North Dakota	33%
Montana	31%
Maryland	31%
Nevada	31%
California	31%
Washington	30%
Alaska	30%
Colorado	30%
Oregon	29%
New York	29%
Hawaii	28%
Connecticut	28%
Wisconsin	27%
Massachusetts	23%
New Hampshire	22%
Maine	22%
Vermont	21%

== Demographics ==
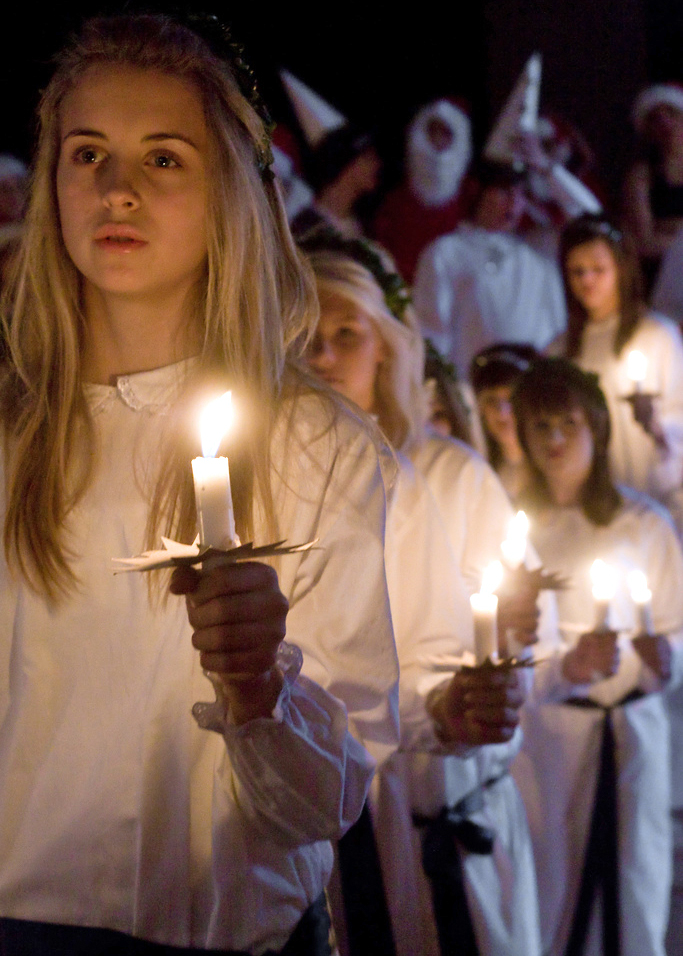
A Lutheran Christian girl leads a church procession on Saint Lucy's Day in Sweden.

The Pew Research Center in 2016 studied the effects of gender on religiosity throughout the world, finding that women are generally more religious than men, yet the gender gap is greater for Christians than Muslims. Pew Research Center data in 53 countries, found that 53% of Christian women and 46% of Christian men say they attend services at least once a week. While Christians of both genders in African countries are equally likely to regularly attend services.

Church attendance remains stronger among older demographics, and more common for women in the West. There is evidence that links church attendance with health benefits. The Pew Research Center, which conducts the extensive research and information program Pew Forum on Religion and Public Life, has linked regular church attendance with happiness. Several studies associated church attendance with decreased risk of Alzheimer's disease. Research by Rita W. Law and David A. Sbarra demonstrated that "church attendance was found to have a protective effect against the emergence of mood problems among older adults." Graham et al. discovered that "consistent pattern of lower systolic and diastolic blood pressures among frequent church attenders was found compared to that of infrequent attenders which was not due to the effects of age, obesity, cigarette smoking, or socioeconomic status". Oman D et al. found that "infrequent (never or less than weekly) attenders had significantly higher rates of circulatory, cancer, digestive, and respiratory mortality (p < 0.05), but not mortality due to external causes." With respect to students, Glanville et al. found "that religious attendance promotes higher intergenerational closure, friendship networks with higher educational resources and norms, and extracurricular participation". Research conducted at the Harvard School of Public Health found "that regularly attending church services together reduces a couple’s risk of divorce by 47 percent".

A 2018 sociological survey found that in the United States, "Donald Trump voters who attend church regularly are more likely than nonreligious Trump voters to have warmer feelings toward racial and religious minorities, to be more supportive of immigration and trade, and to be more concerned about poverty." A 2005 European Union survey found that religious belief increased with age and was higher among women, those who were leaning towards right-wing politics, and those reflecting more upon philosophical and ethical issues. In particular, the Iona Institute, a socially conservative Christian advocacy group, stated that there was increasing church attendance there, despite sex-abuse scandals that plagued the Catholic Church.

Research shows that there is a correlation between church attendance and the level of education. For instance, in a Pew Research study from 1996, approximately 34% of high school dropouts went to church on a typical Sunday, while 44% of those with a college degree or higher did. 48% of married individuals attended church on a typical Sunday, compared with 29% of divorced and 31% of never-married individuals. While it is likely that the well-educated and married might over-report their church attendance more often, these findings nevertheless demonstrate that they have maintained a stronger church-going identity than other Americans. In the United Kingdom, research in 2018 demonstrated that "Students at Oxford, Cambridge and Durham are twice as likely to worship on a Sunday as the general population"—colleges at these universities maintain approximately fifty-six chapels for worship.

According to a 2017 study by the Pew Research Center, overall U.S. adults with college degrees are less religious than others, but the pattern does not hold among American Christians. The study found that highly educated Christians in the United States are more likely to attend church than those with lower education levels. On a scale measuring levels of religious commitment, over 70% of Christians in the United States who are educated demonstrate high levels of religiosity.

=== Among youth ===
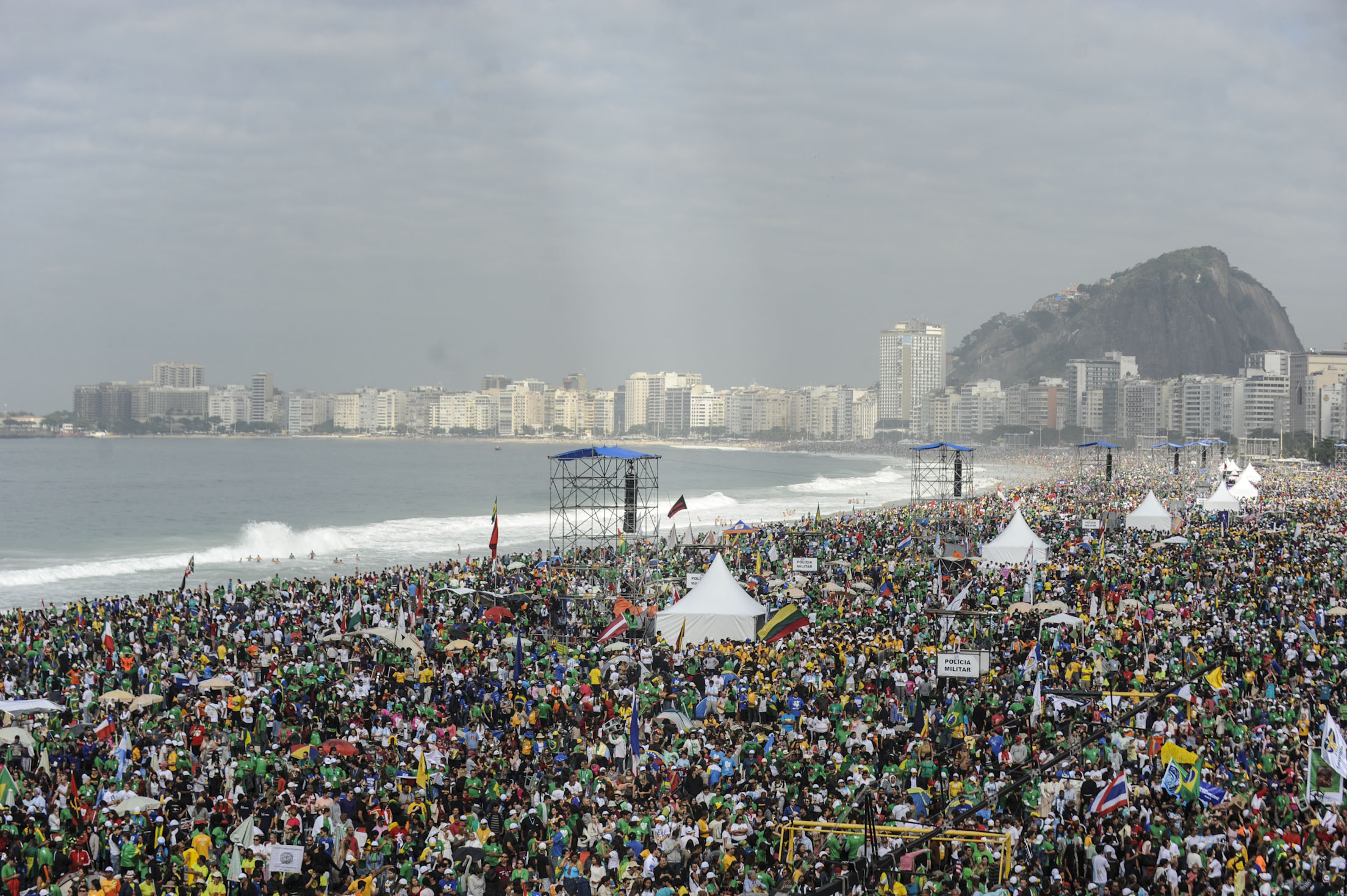
Young Christians gather in Rio de Janeiro during the Roman Catholic World Youth Day 2013.

In recent years, several studies and headlines had highlighted a trend among Generation Z (those born roughly between the late 1990s and early 2010s)—including a notable surge among young men—showing a renewed turn toward Christian religious practice, especially church attendance and deeper spiritual engagement. According to such reports, younger generations—particularly Gen Z and Millennials—are driving what researchers call a "Christian resurgence," with belief in and commitment to Christianity rising compared with previous periods, while older age groups have remained more stable in their religious attitudes. However, BBC in 2026 reported that previous claims from press coverage such as the Quite Revival report by the Bible Society suggesting Britain saw "skyrocketing" attendance of youths, have since been considered a misleading narrative and their findings questioned. The Times and Atlantic reported that in America there was actually a stabilization, but younger Americans are still the least religious group by metrics, and Gen Zers are the least likely to attend religious services regularly.

After years of steep decline, Christian affiliation across much of the Western world has leveled off. In the United States, for example, studies reported that since around 2020 the share of adults identifying as Christian has steadied at roughly 62 percent. Among Generation Z, the reversal is even clearer: church membership climbed from 45 percent to 51 percent between 2023 and 2024, while the proportion of religiously unaffiliated "nones" slipped from 45 percent to 41 percent. In America much of the increase is driven by political affiliation through those who are conservatives and identify with the Republican party. A similar pattern for the male gender was observed in Australia, and the United Kingdom, where young men are identifying with traditional religion much more than their female peers, and young men's church attendance increased alongside identification. Christian self-identification has also been stabilizing in the Western countries, and adult baptismal rates rose in France, Sweden, Austria and Belgium. In the UK these claims of "revival" promoted through media journalism have been critiqued as flawed by the National Centre for Social Research, as overall national wide church attendance has stayed at 5%, and there were no signs of a Christian resurgence amongst younger people. Specifically, in 2025 it was seen that 4% of people under 35 in Britain attend services weekly, which is a consistent flatline since 2017 where it was 8%. Monthly attendance for young Christians was also at 26%, which was lower than its pre-pandemic average of 36%. Christian weekly attendance was also 13%, down from 20% in previous years.

Many sociologists link this shift to the COVID-19 pandemic, arguing that months of isolation and heightened awareness of mortality spurred a renewed search for meaning, particularly among younger generations. Notably, young men—long underrepresented in church life—are now returning in unexpected numbers, a striking change after decades when women dominated weekly attendance. Events such as the 2023 Asbury Revival in the United States, which drew thousands of college students—many of them Gen Z—and spread widely on social media, underscore the digital dimension of this spiritual movement.

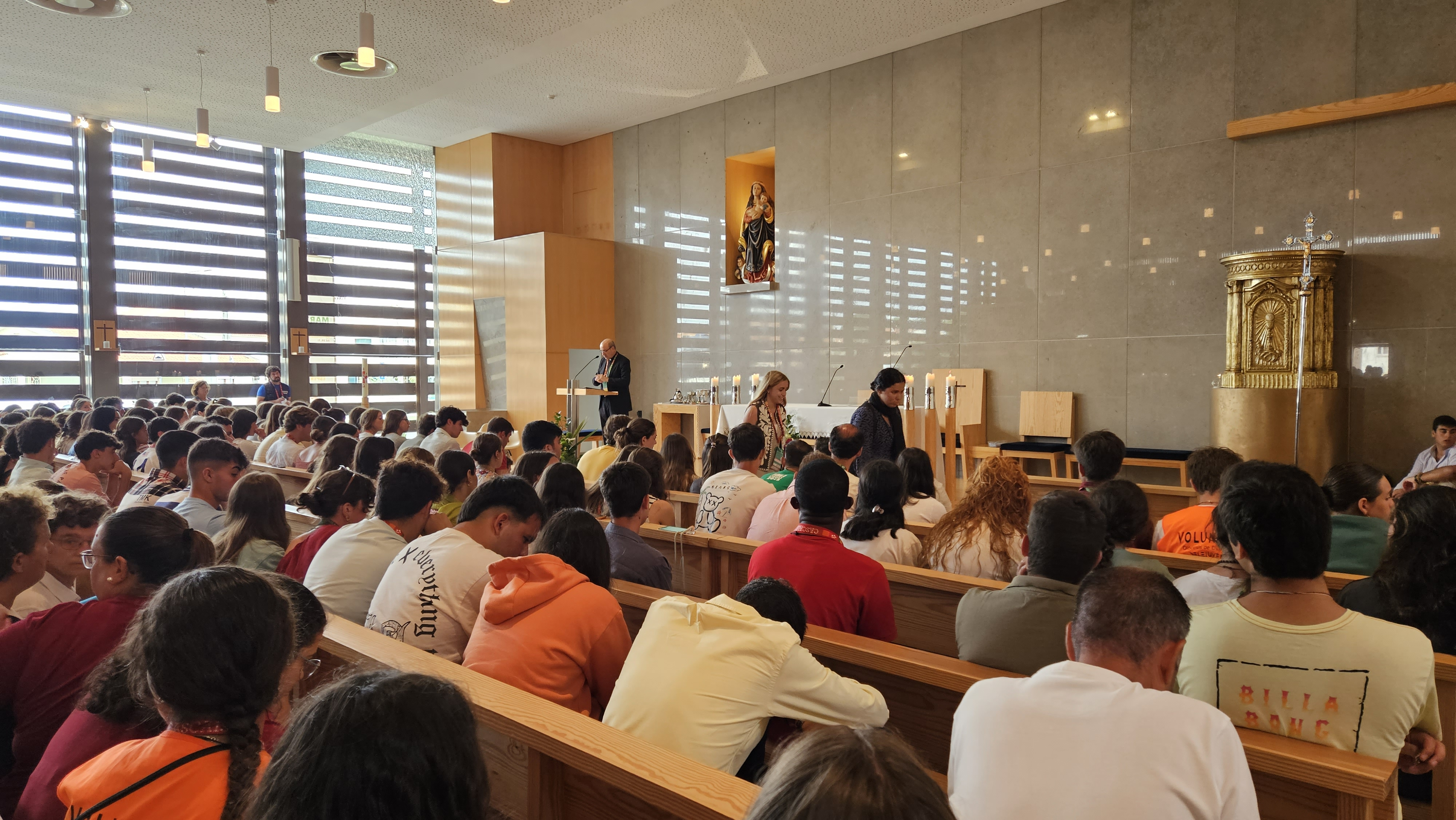
Young Christians attending catechism classes in Portugal

A contemporary revival of "muscular Christianity" links physical fitness with Christian faith, appealing to young men seeking discipline and purpose. Social-media platforms such as TikTok and Instagram amplify this aesthetic, circulating short videos that pair strength training with biblical themes. Surveys by the Barna Group, and Pew Research find that Gen Z men increasingly encounter religious content online and report greater interest in church life as a result. There has also been discussion that the renewed religiosity is driven by manosphere content and political conservatist spaces, and that it is not a nationwide shift. Some sociologists and religion scholars attribute part of the recent rise in church attendance among young men to this online movement, noting that figures such as podcast host Joe Rogan, apologist Wes Huff, and psychologist Jordan Peterson often serve as entry points that turn casual exposure into renewed participation in Christian practice. Humanists UK pointed out that Christian nationalism and pro-Christian influencers who appeal to young men have a desire to claim these demographics of church attendance to influence the cultural narrative.

Reports also noted that some young men are converting to what they see as more "masculine expressions" of Christianity, such as the Eastern and Oriental Orthodox churches, confessional branches of Evangelical Lutheranism and traditionalist branches of Catholicism. While exact figures are difficult to verify, Pew Research Center data indicated that the Orthodox Christian population is now about 64% male, up from 46% in 2007, suggesting a marked demographic shift toward men within these communities.

=== Influence of parents ===
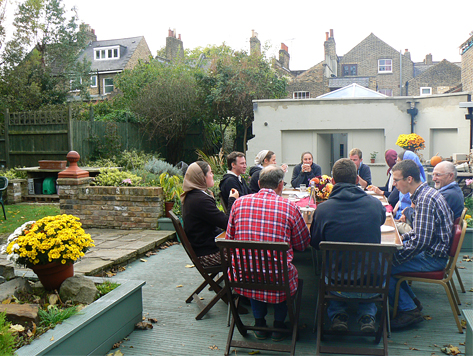
Conservative Anabaptist denominations, such as the Bruderhof Communities, continue to experience growth.

Several research studies in the US and Europe found that church attendance practices of parents, especially fathers, can be highly influential in forming the future church attendance practices of their children.

In Switzerland, the Fertility and Family Survey was commissioned by the Federal Statistical Office (Switzerland) to enable Switzerland to take part in this international project launched by the UNECE Population Activities Unit. The survey was conducted between October 1994 and May 1995, with the results being published in 2000 by the Council of Europe. The results are representative of Switzerland's permanent resident population aged 20–49 and presented in the table below.

Practice of religion according to practice of parents (%)

Practice of parents		Practice of children		
Father	Mother	Regular	Irregular	Non-practicing
Regular	Regular	32.8	41.4	25.8
Regular	Irregular	37.7	37.6	24.7
Regular	Non-practicing	44.2	22.4	33.4
Irregular	Regular	3.4	58.6	38.0
Irregular	Irregular	7.8	60.8	31.4
Irregular	Non-practicing	25.4	22.8	51.8
Non-practicing	Regular	1.5	37.4	61.1
Non-practicing	Irregular	2.3	37.8	59.9
Non-practicing	Non-practicing	4.6	14.7	80.7

A non-practicing mother with a regular father will see a minimum of two-thirds of her children ending up at church. In contrast, a non-practicing father with a regular mother will see two-thirds of his children not attending church. If his wife is similarly non-practicing that figure rises to 80 percent.

An American study found similar results on the impact of fathers:

- When both parents attend Sunday school, 72% of the children attend Sunday school when grown.
- When only the father attends Sunday school, 55% of the children attend when grown.
- When only the mother attends Sunday school, 15% of the children attend when grown.
- When neither parent attends Sunday school, only 6% of the children attend when grown.

Pew Research Center's 2025 report on global religious switching, discovered that in Europe many leave their childhood religions, and Christianity had the highest ratios of people leaving to people joining, with Italy leading at 28.4 who left for every 1.0 that joined.

=== Invitations ===
Christianity Today noted research on individuals residing in the United States and Canada concluded that "Ninety-six percent of the unchurched are at least somewhat likely to attend church if they are invited." In July 2018, LifeWay Research found that "Nearly two-thirds of Protestant churchgoers say they’ve invited at least one person to visit their church in the past six months".

== Trends ==
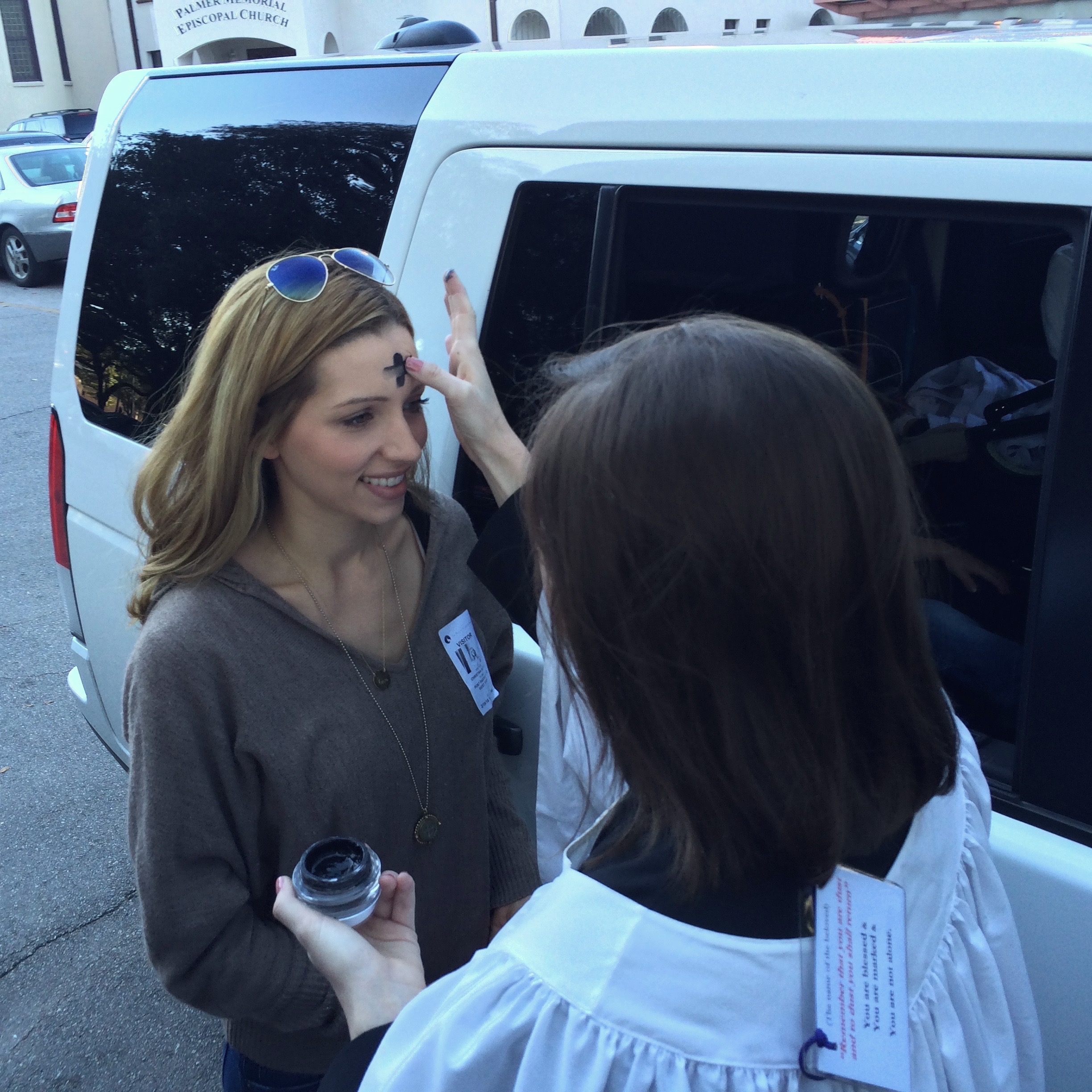
The Christian season of Lent begins on Ash Wednesday, most notably by the public imposition of ashes. In this photograph, a woman receives a cross of ashes on Ash Wednesday at an Episcopal Christian church.

In 2014, CRA showed Church attendance in advanced industrial societies is in gradual general decline with people shifting from weekly to monthly or holiday attendance. Sociologists have attributed this trend to a number of reasons, starting from a simple boredom during services and lack of motivation, to generational incompatibility of belief systems and social changes attributed to modernity. Research across 65 different nations showed that out of 20 advanced industrial countries, 16 demonstrated a declining rate of monthly church attendance.

An article published in the Christianity Today Magazine in 2007 suggested that in America, church attendance since the 1990s had remained stable.

The percent of Americans who regularly attend religious services has fluctuated over time, but was at a low point in 2017. In Gallup Poll surveys, the yearly aggregate of those who answer "yes" to the question "Did you, yourself, happen to attend church or synagogue in the last seven days, or not?" was 36% in 2014, 2015, and 2016. This is a very long-running Gallup question: "In 1939, when Gallup first asked this question, 41% said "yes". That percentage dropped to 37% in 1940 and rose to 39% in 1950. It continued to climb, reaching as high as 49% at multiple points in the 1950s. Attendance then settled down to figures around 40% for decades, before dropping to 36%" beginning in 2014. Other reports indicated that church attendance in the USA may have increased amongst specific demographics creating political and gender gaps. Moreover, while Christian identification has declined in the long term, it has had consistent short term stability and levelled off.

The decline in church attendance was more pronounced in developed European countries, where it is suggested that the secular culture overrides interest in religion. In Poland, church attendance has declined from more than 50% in 1979 to 40% in 2012, and 30% as of 2025.

== Disparity between self reported and actual attendance ==
In the early 1990s, American sociologists Kirk Hadaway, Penny Marler, and Mark Chaves found that weekly attendance at Protestant and Catholic churches in one rural county in Ohio was only about 20%, whereas self-reported church attendance was 36%. The following studies confirmed a long-suspected gap between actual and self-reporting church attendance. The researchers have been wary of accusing over-reporters of dishonesty, as they found in the study that those who over-report do so mainly to maintain perceptions of themselves as "churched" Americans, not because they are afraid to reveal to the interviewer that they are "bad Christians". The findings point to a bigger issue as many people in the world may be over-reporting church attendance because of their self-perception and identity as churchgoing people, indicating a certain psychological aspect to the over-reporting of church attendance. Although surveys of church attendance are aimed to study religious behavior, many respondents view them as questions about their identity. This is especially true among Americans who consider themselves "regular churchgoers".

== See also ==
- Catechism of the Catholic Church
- Christian Church
- Christian denomination
- Church membership
- Church service
- List of largest church buildings
- Service of worship
- Solemn Pontifical Mass
