= Leonard Sweet =

American theologian, semiotician, church historian, pastor, and author

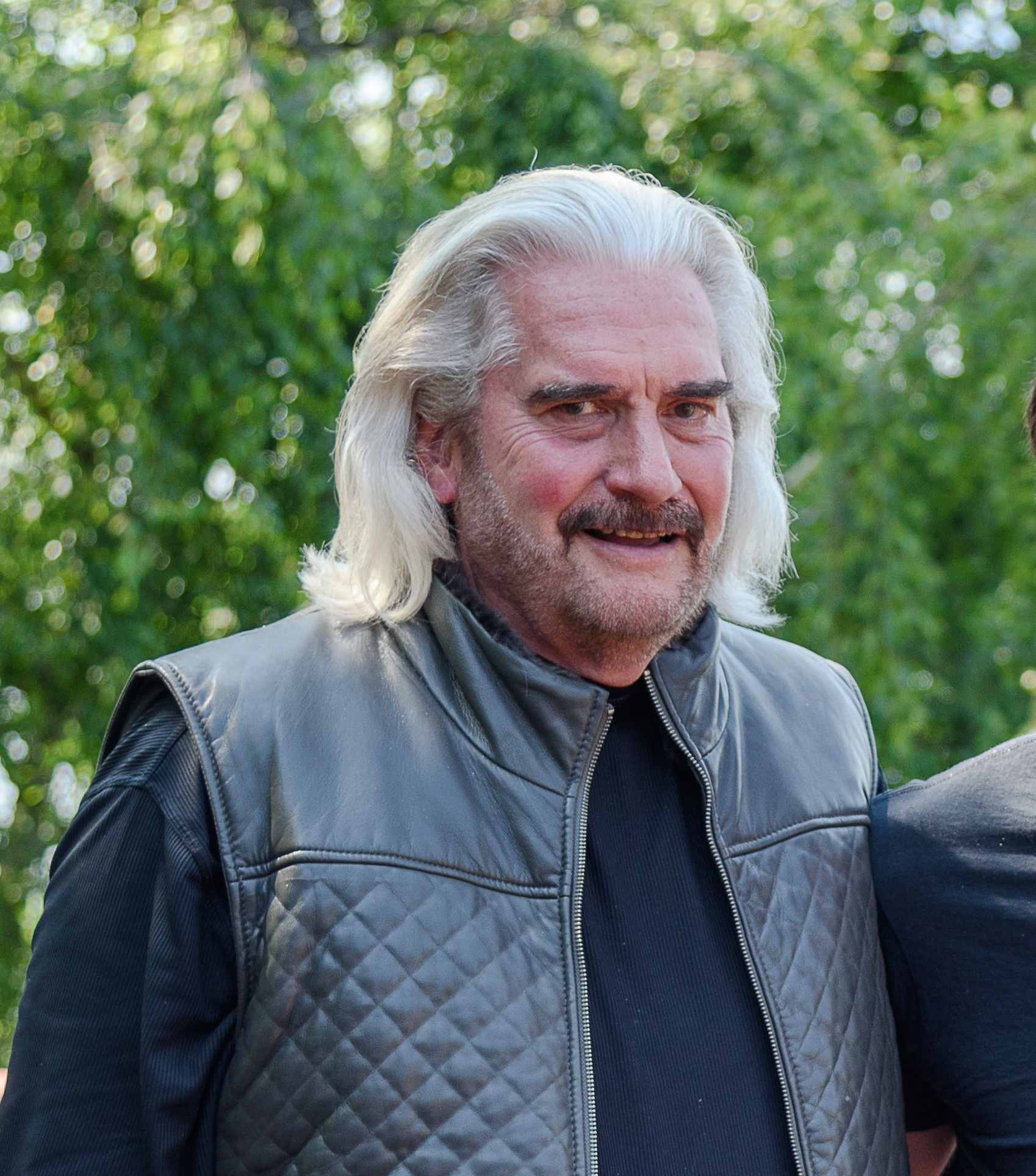
- Leonard Sweet in 2019
- Born: Leonard I. Sweet; Gloversville, New York
- Education: BA, University of Richmond, Master of Divinity Colgate/Rochester/Bexley Hall/Crozer and PhD University of Rochester
- Occupations: Theologian; semiotician; church historian; pastor; author
- Employer: Drew University
- Title: Professor
- Spouse: Tia Nicole Sweet
- Website: leonardsweet.com

Leonard I. Sweet is an American theologian, semiotician, church historian, pastor, and author. Sweet currently serves as the E. Stanley Jones Professor Emeritus at Drew Theological School at Drew University, in Madison, New Jersey; Charles Wesley Distinguished Professor of Doctoral Studies at Evangelical Seminary; distinguished visiting professor at Tabor College; and visiting distinguished professor at George Fox University in Portland, Oregon. Sweet is ordained in the United Methodist Church.

== Early life ==
Leonard Sweet was raised in the Wesleyan tradition. His mother Mabel Boggs Sweet was ordained in the Pilgrim Holiness Church, then the Free Methodist Church.

Growing up, the Sweet family always attended holiness camp-meetings and Methodist watchnight services on New Year's Eve.

== Academic engagements ==
Before his current seminary positions, Sweet had been E. Stanley Jones Professor of Evangelism, Vice President of Academic Affairs, and Dean of the Theological School at Drew from 1995 to 2015. Prior to his appointments at Drew University, he served as President and Professor of Church History at United Theological Seminary, Dayton, Ohio. His first academic administration position was as Provost and Associate Professor of Church History at Colgate Rochester Divinity School/Bexley Hall/Crozer Theological Seminary.

Sweet is founder and President of SpiritVenture Ministries and owner of the preaching resource website www.preachthestory.com. He also founded in 2020 a new publishing company called The Salish Sea Press. His writings focus on the study of Semiotics.

He is the author of more than sixty books, hundreds of articles (many of a scholarly and technical nature), and over 80 prefaces/forewords to others' books. He has published over 1500 sermons in the journal Homiletics, Preachingplus.com, sermons.com and preachthestory.com. In 2005, Sweet created the first open-source preaching website called Wikiletics.com. Sweet posts weekly podcasts on iTunes entitled Napkin Scribbles and posts on YouTube a weekly LenTalk.

Sweet has served a term on the council of the American Society of Church History and was an associate editor of the Journal of the American Academy of Religion for ten years. An honors and Phi Beta Kappa graduate of the University of Richmond, he earned his Master of Divinity degree from Colgate/Rochester/Bexley Hall/Crozer and PhD from the University of Rochester. Sweet is the recipient of honorary Doctorates of Divinity from University of Richmond, Baker University, Lebanon Valley College, Coe College, and Otterbein College.

== Selected bibliography ==
- Soul Tsunami (Zondervan, 1999) (ISBN 0310227623)
- The Three Hardest Words In The World To Get Right (WaterBrook Press, 2006) (ISBN 1-57856-648-7)
- The Gospel According to Starbucks (WaterBrook Press, 2007)
- The Voice from on High (Thomas Nelson, 2007)
- The Voice: Genesis (Thomas Nelson, 2008)
- The Church of the Perfect Storm (Abingdon, 2008)
- 11: Indispensable Relationships You Can't Be Without (Cook Communications, 2008)
- Postmodern and Wesleyan?: Exploring the Boundaries and Possibilities (Beacon Hill Press, 2009) (ISBN 978-0834124585)
- So Beautiful (David C Cook, 2009) (978-1434799791)
- Jesus Manifesto: Restoring the Supremacy and Sovereignty of Jesus Christ (with Frank Viola) (Thomas Nelson, 2010) (ISBN 978-0849946011)
- Nudge: Awakening Each Other to the God Who’s Already There (David C. Cook, 2010) (ISBN 1434764745)
- The Seraph Seal (with Lori Wagner) (Thomas Nelson, 2011) (ISBN 978-0849920776)
- Real Church in a Social Network World: From Facebook to Face-to-Face Faith (WaterBrook Press, 2011) (e-book) (ASIN B004Y89RKI)
- I Am a Follower: The Way, Truth, and Life of Following Jesus (Thomas Nelson, 2012) (ISBN 978-0849946387)
- Viral: How Social Networking is Poised to Ignite Revival (WaterBrook Press, 2012) (ISBN 978-0307459152)
- What Matters Most: How We Got the Point but Missed the Person (WaterBrook Press, 2012) (ISBN 978-0307730572)
- The Greatest Story Never Told: Revive Us Again (Abingdon Press, 2012) (ISBN 978-1426740329)
- Jesus: A Theography (with Frank Viola) (Thomas Nelson, 2012) (ISBN 978-0849947025)
- From Tablet to Table: Where Community is Found and Identity is Formed (NavPress, 2015) (ISBN 978-1612915814)
- Jesus Speaks (with Frank Viola) (Thomas Nelson, 2016) (ISBN 978-0718032203)
- The Well Played Life (Tyndale, 2014) (ISBN 978-1414373621)
- Giving Blood: A Fresh Paradigm for Preaching (Zondervan, 2014) (ISBN 978-0310515456)
- Me and We (Abingdon Press, 2014) (ISBN 142675776X)
- The Bad Habits of Jesus (Tyndale House, 2016) (ISBN 978-1496417510)
- Mother Tongue (NavPress, 2017) (ISBN 978-1612915821)
- Rings of Fire: Walking in Faith Through a Volcanic Future (NavPress, 2019) (ISBN 978-1631463945)
- St. Is with Lisa Samson (The Salish Sea Press, 2020).
