= Post-congregational narrative =

Term

Post-congregational narrative is a term used by some who describe themselves as followers of Christ (Christians) to refer to the experience of intentionally pursuing their faith outside the traditional congregational setting. The word "narrative" in this sense refers to their stories or journeys, both individually and collectively. Likewise, "congregational narrative" had become a term that many of these people had used to describe traditional church life in their assertions that it wasn't necessarily the only way to follow Christ.

== Description ==
Adherents believe they are no less intentional about following Christ and connecting to other Christians, and in many cases, have created other ways of connecting, sometimes functioning over long distances through the internet. Some of the good works of the traditional congregation are replicated in these more loose associations. Meetings, when they occur are more often impromptu. They also claim that personal relationships are the starting point of their connection to the church, rather than personal relationships being a product of a connection with a traditional congregation.

Historically, the church has been doubtful of the possibility of being a follower of Christ and not connecting to a community of believers. This begins with the biblical injunction "Let us not give up meeting together, as some are in the habit of doing" (Hebrews 10:25). The Nicene Creed, makes the statement "I believe in one, holy catholic, apostolic church." Cyprian of Carthage's well known phrase Extra Ecclesiam nulla salus and the thought "he cannot have God for his father who has not the church for his mother" both combine to make the same point. More recently Lesslie Newbigin said "The New Testament knows nothing of a relationship with Christ which is purely mental and spiritual, unembodied in any of the structures of human relationship."

There is some overlap between people identifying with the post-congregational narrative and other movements, especially the emerging church and what gets loosely referred to as "post-modern" Christianity. Some shared areas of concern between these two groups are spiritual transformation, community, social justice and the environment. Many of these Christians have grown up in theologically conservative evangelical churches that were also politically conservative and have concluded that the former kind of conservatism does not necessarily require the latter.

Some authors who have struck a nerve in this community are Dallas Willard, author of The Divine Conspiracy and Renovation of the Heart; George Barna, author of Revolution; Wayne Jacobsen, co-author of So You Don't Want to Go to Church Anymore and Jim Wallis, author of God's Politics: Why the Right Gets It Wrong and the Left Doesn't Get It.

== Selected articles ==
- "Ten Myths About Church Leavers" by Alan Jamieson. Reality Magazine, Issue 32, Apr-May 1999. pp. 21–24

== Selected publications ==
- Jamieson, Alan. A Churchless Faith. London: SPCK, 2002.
- Jamieson, Alan et al. Church Leavers: Faith Journeys Five Years On. London: SPCK, 2006.
- Colsen, Jake. So You Don't Want to Go to Church Anymore. Moorpark, CA: Lifestream Press, 2006.
