= Frank Viola (author) =

American Christian author

- Born: October 12, 1964 (age 61)
- Occupations: Author, speaker, blogger

Frank Viola (born October 12, 1964) is an American author, speaker, and blogger on Christian topics. His work focuses on Jesus studies and biblical narrative, with a strong emphasis on helping the poor and the oppressed. He is most noted for his emphasis on the gospel of the kingdom, the centrality and supremacy of Jesus Christ, and the idea that Jesus indwells all Christians and they can learn to live by his life.

Viola's early work was focused on organic church and missional church themes. His older books advocated church life based on the spiritual principles of the New Testament, the headship of Christ, face-to-face community, and the priesthood of all believers.

Since 2009, Viola's work has been focused on Jesus studies, living by the indwelling life of Christ, God's eternal purpose, the present-day ministry of Christ, and biblical narrative. Viola has authored over 20 books, over 1,000 blog articles, and over 300 podcast episodes. His podcast, Christ is All, has been ranked #1 in Canada and #2 in the USA (respectively) in the "Christianity" section of iTunes.

His blog, Beyond Evangelical, is regularly ranked in the top 10 of Christian blogs on the Web.

Viola and professor Leonard Sweet have written three books together, each focusing on Christology: Jesus Speaks, Jesus: A Theography and Jesus Manifesto.

Since 2012, Viola has been strongly focused on helping the poor and the oppressed. Concerning the poor, Viola has said that helping those who are in need is part of "the Magna Carta of the Church of Jesus Christ as she continues the ministry of Jesus on earth (Luke 4:18–19). Scripture, both Old Testament and New Testament, make clear that this is very much on God's heart."

Aside from being an author and speaker on Christian topics, Viola consults authors, bloggers, and writers in their craft. He lectures throughout the USA and around the world, having spoken in various locations including Canada, Ireland, South Africa, Chile, Argentina, Germany, Switzerland, and the Netherlands.

== Bibliography ==
- The Untold Story of the New Testament Church: Revised and Expanded, 2025, Destiny Image ISBN 978-0768461626
- 48 Laws of Spiritual Power, 2022, Tyndale Momentum ISBN 978-1496452269
- Hang On, Let Go, 2021, Tyndale Momentum ISBN 978-1496452221
- ReGrace, 2019, Baker Books ISBN 978-0801077159
- Insurgence, 2018, Baker Books ISBN 978-0801077012
- Jesus Speaks (with Leonard Sweet), 2016, Thomas Nelson ISBN 978-0718032203
- The Day I Met Jesus (with Mary DeMuth), 2015, Baker Books ISBN 978-0801016851
- Jesus Now, 2014, David C. Cook ISBN 978-0781405911
- God's Favorite Place on Earth, 2013, David C. Cook ISBN 978-0781405904
- Jesus: A Theography (with Leonard Sweet, 2012, Thomas Nelson Inc ISBN 978-0849947025
- Revise Us Again, 2011, David C. Cook ISBN 978-1434768650
- Jesus Manifesto (with Leonard Sweet), 2010, Thomas Nelson Inc ISBN 978-0849946011
- From Eternity to Here, 2009, David C. Cook ISBN 978-1434768704
- Finding Organic Church, 2009, David C. Cook ISBN 978-1434768667
- Reimagining Church, 2008, David C Cook ISBN 978-1434768759
- Pagan Christianity (with George Barna), 2008, Tyndale Momentum ISBN 978-1414314853

== See also ==
- Kingdom of God (Christianity)
- Missional
