= George Barna =

American sociologist

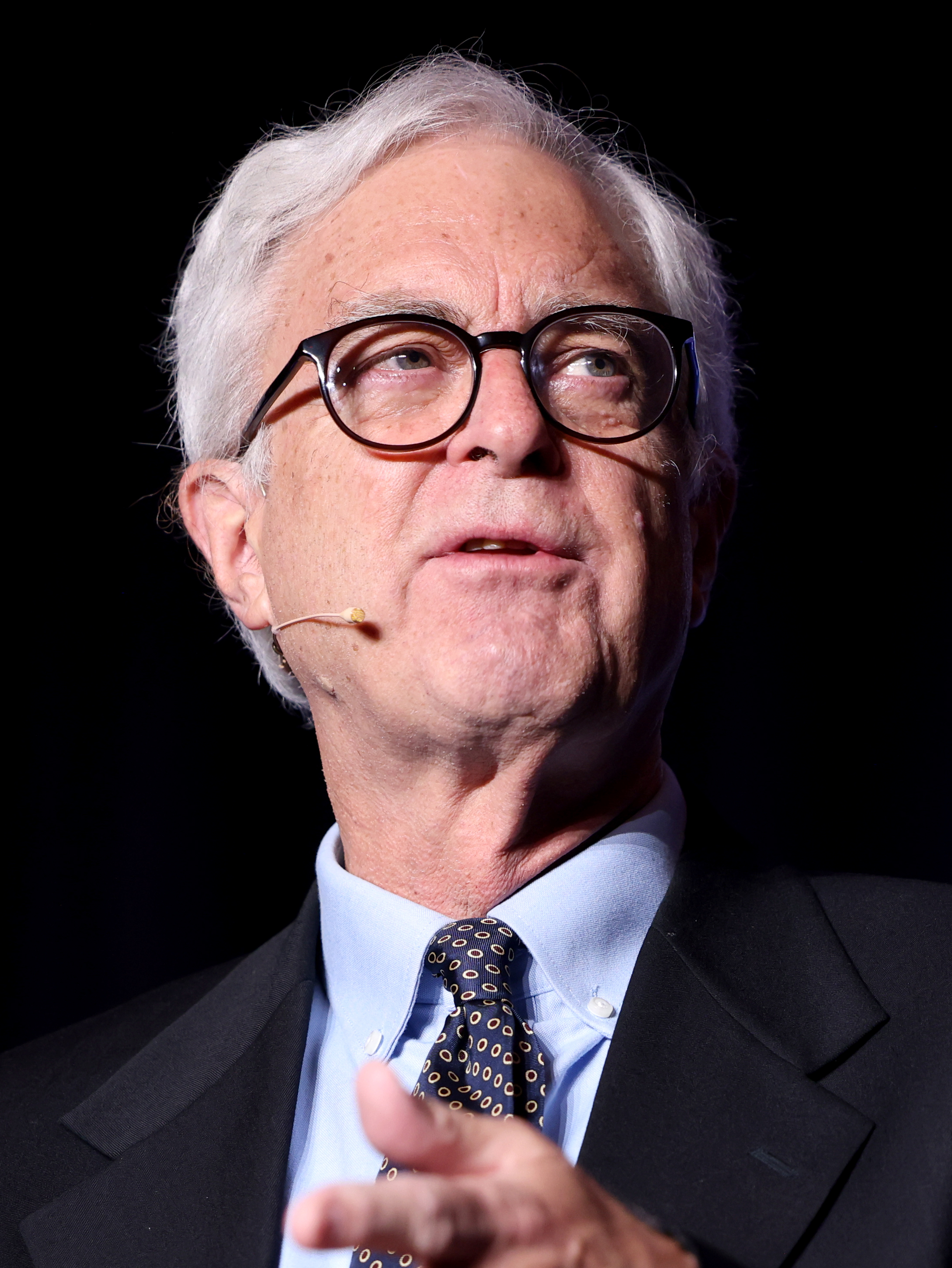
- Barna in 2026
- Born: 1954 (age 71–72); New York City, US
- Education: Boston College, Rutgers University
- Occupations: pollster, market researcher, founder of The Barna Group
- Spouse: Nancy Barna

George Barna (born 1954) is the founder of The Barna Group, a market research firm specializing in studying the religious beliefs and behavior of Americans, and the intersection of faith and culture. From 2013–2018 he served as the executive director of the American Culture & Faith Institute, the research division of United in Purpose. In 2019 he became a professor at Arizona Christian University in Phoenix, Arizona, where he also started the Cultural Research Center at Arizona Christian University. He is also the senior research fellow for Christian ethics and Biblical worldview at Family Research Council.

== Background ==
George Barna grew up a Catholic in New York City and Princeton, New Jersey but he has since engaged with evangelical Christianity.

Barna has filled executive roles in politics, marketing, advertising, media development, research and ministry. He founded the Barna Research Group in 1984 (now The Barna Group), a marketing research firm focused on the intersection of faith and culture. Through the Barna Group, George served several hundred parachurch ministries, thousands of Christian churches, and many other non-profit and for-profit organizations as well as the U.S. military. He sold it in 2009.

He currently serves as the president of Metaformation, a faith development organization.

Barna has written more than 50 books, mostly addressing cultural trends, leadership, spiritual development, and church dynamics. They include New York Times bestsellers and several award-winning books. His works have been translated into more than a dozen foreign languages. He has sold more books based on survey research related to matters of faith than any author in American history.

His work is frequently cited as an authoritative source by the media. Barna has been hailed as "the most quoted person in the Christian Church today" and has been named by various media as one of the nation's most influential Christian leaders.

A frequent speaker at ministry conferences around the world, he has been on the faculty at several universities and seminaries, and has served as a pastor of a large, multi-ethnic church as well as a house church, and has helped to start several churches.

After graduating summa cum laude from Boston College, Barna earned two master's degrees from Rutgers University and received an honorary doctorate from Dallas Baptist University.

After attending high school and college together, George and his wife Nancy married in 1978. They have three adopted daughters — two from Guatemala, one from Russia and three grandchildren. They live on the central California coast and attend Mission Church in Ventura. He enjoys reading, music, rooting for the Yankees and Lakers, and relaxing on the beach.

Barna leads seminars for church leaders, speaks at ministry conferences, has taught at seminaries, and has been a pastor. As an author, he has written more than 50 books on contemporary Christian issues, with topics ranging from worldviews, trends and children to church life, spiritual growth and leadership. He also written more than 200 articles that have been published in professional journals, mass market publications, and online.

As a result of his work, Barna has coined several terms, including:

- Mosaic Generation – the demographic profile of those born between 1984 and 2002. According to Barna, this generation is "very mosaic in every aspect of their life." He continues, "There's no attribute that really dominates like you might have seen with prior generations." Barna also describes this group as "comfortable with contradiction", "post-modern" and exhibiting "non-linear" thinking.
- Theolographics – the theological perspectives and applications of people;
- Spiritainment – a portmanteau which refers to the blending of spirituality and entertainment, toward influencing people's spiritual perspectives.
- SAGE Cons – an acronym that stands for Spiritually Active Governance Engaged Conservative Christians - the roughly 10% of the US adult population who are compelled by their commitment to Christianity and biblical obedience to be informed and involved in governance and political issues

== Findings ==
Barna is known for providing extensive surveys regarding Christianity and the state of the church. Among his findings that have generated substantial interest or controversy in recent years include:

- Children are the most important population segment to minister to because of their spiritual teachability and developmental vulnerability;
- God transforms people's lives in connection with a 10-stop journey that is surprisingly consistent across people groups
- Conservative Christians are eager to have their pastors teach them how to think biblically about current cultural issues, but pastors are reluctant to get involved in matters that are political and controversial;
- Christian churches in the United States have been generally ineffective vessels for evangelism and discipleship;
- Most Protestant pastors are neither called to nor competent in leadership;
- Only one out of every ten American adults has a biblical worldview, including less than one out of every three born again adults;
- Every church engages in marketing, but few do it well;
- Mass media has the most dramatic effect on people's behavior and beliefs;
- A growing group of spiritually devout Christians, known as Revolutionaries, are embracing a post-congregational narrative that is reshaping spiritual life in the U.S.;
- Most "church growth" is simply the recycling of church-goers from one congregation to another.
- Divorce rate amongst born-again Christians is significantly higher than that for atheist/agnostics. A more recent 2008 Barna report shows a closer divorce rate gap between born-again Christians (32% had been divorced) and atheist/agnostics (30% had been divorced).
- Donald Trump won the presidency in 2016 because of the Christian vote. Among Christians, Trump received 57% of their votes, compared to 37% for Clinton. Among non-Christian voters, Clinton was preferred by a 62% to 26% margin. SAGE Cons were the most prolific voter segment for Trump: 91% voted, and 93% of them voted for Trump.

Barna considers Maximum Faith to be his most significant book. Others that he cites as being especially valuable include Transforming Children into Spiritual Champions, Think Like Jesus, The Power of Vision, and Revolution. Since 2009 in addition to writing his own books he has also been a writer for hire, penning books such as The Cause Within You, for Matthew Barnett, which became a New York Times bestseller in 2011.

== Selected publications ==
- The Day Christians Changed America (2016)
- America at the Crossroads (2016)
- U-Turn with David Barton
- Maximum Faith (2013)
- Revolutionary Parenting
- Futurecast
- Master Leaders
- Pagan Christianity with Frank Viola (2008)
- Revolution Carol Stream, IL: Tyndale House, 2005. ISBN 1-4143-0758-6
- The Frog in the Kettle
- The Power of Vision (2009)
- Transforming Children into Spiritual Champions
- The Seven Faith Tribes
- Think Like Jesus (2005)
- Growing True Disciples
- The Power of Team Leadership

== See also ==
- Arizona Christian University
- The Barna Group
