= Barna Group =

Evangelical Christian polling firm

The Barna Group is an evangelical Christian polling firm based in Ventura, California.

== History ==
Barna Research Group was founded by George and Nancy Barna in 1984 and restructured in 2004 to become the Barna Group. The Barna Group was sold in September 2009.

== Overview ==
The Barna Group consists of five divisions focusing on:

- primary research (The Barna Research Group)
- communications tools (Barna Films)
- printed resources (Barna Books)
- leadership development for young people (The Josiah Corps)
- church facilitation and enhancement (Transformation Church Network)

It was founded in 1984 by George Barna, a media research specialist holding graduate degrees in urban planning and political science, for the purpose of providing "research and marketing expertise as a service to Christian ministry." For the first seven years of its existence, the Barna Group provided research services for the Disney Channel, work that provided enough cash flow to allow the company to gradually expand its services to the Evangelical Christian community. Other clients have included the American Broadcasting Company, Visa, and the military. In 1991, the company cut ties with Disney to concentrate its resources on a campaign to transform the church.

The term notional Christians seems to have been created by the Barna Group for the purposes of gathering statistics. They define the term as follows: "We categorize Notional Christian as those who describe themselves as Christians, but do not believe that they will have eternal life because of their reliance upon the death and resurrection of Jesus Christ and the grace extended to people through a relationship with Christ. (A large majority of these individuals believe they will have eternal life, but not because of a grace-based relationship with Jesus Christ.)"

== Books ==
The Barna Group has released more than 400 books. Recent popular titles include De-evolution (2006), which discusses how Christians have exited traditional churches to embrace non-traditional/Jewish faith communities and unChristian (2007), which studies how outsiders perceive the church at large and includes contributions from authors like Rick Warren, Brian McLaren, Mike Foster, Sarah Cunningham, Margaret Feinberg, and Rick McKinley.

== Criticism ==
The Barna Group has also been criticized by some in the "born again" movement for devaluing the meaning of the "new birth". In his book Finally Alive, John Piper, a pastor at Bethlehem Baptist Church in Minneapolis, MN, states that:

In the report titled “Born Again Christians Just as Likely to Divorce as Are Non-Christians,” Barna uses the word evangelicals interchangeably with born again [....] In other words, the broadly defined evangelical church as a whole in America and the West in general is apparently not very unlike the world. It goes to church on Sunday and has a veneer of religion, but its religion is basically an add-on to the same way of life the world lives, not a transforming power.

John Piper speaks of a tendency within scientific research and the academic community to misrepresent the underlying dynamic of Christian "rebirth," which does not readily lend itself to objectivized empirical analysis:

I’m not saying their research is wrong. It appears to be appallingly right. I am not saying that the church is not as worldly as they say it is. I am saying that the writers of the New Testament think in exactly the opposite direction about being born again. Instead of moving from a profession of faith, to the label born again, to the worldliness of these so-called born again people, to the conclusion that the new birth does not radically change people, the New Testament moves in the other direction.

It moves from the absolute certainty that the new birth radically changes people, to the observation that many professing Christians are indeed (as the Barna Group says) not radically changed, to the conclusion that they are not born again.
