= UNECE Population Activities Unit =

The Population Activities Unit (PAU) is a unit of the United Nations Economic Commission for Europe (UNECE) under the Environment, Housing, and Land Management Division.

The unit handles population-related issues in the member states of the UNECE and supports the implementation of the final documents of inter-governmental conferences on population issues, and contributing towards better-informed policy-making by organizing programmes of data collection and research.
