= Christian mission =

Organized effort to spread Christianity

A Christian mission is an organized effort to spread Christianity, usually through evangelism, preaching, the establishment of churches, and other forms of ministry. Missions commonly involve sending missionaries across geographical or cultural boundaries, although missionary activity can also take place within a missionary's own society. The Great Commission is an important biblical basis for Christian mission, particularly among traditions that understand Christians as called to make disciples and preach the Gospel throughout the world. Missionary work has also included Bible translation, education, medical care, literacy programs, humanitarian aid, and other social services.

Christian missionary activity began with the spread of Christianity beyond its origins in Second Temple Judaism. Paul the Apostle and other early Christians preached among both Jews and Gentiles, and Christian communities subsequently spread through Europe, Africa, and Asia. From Late Antiquity through the Middle Ages, monastic communities and missionaries played an important role in the expansion of Christianity. During the Age of Discovery, Catholic missions accompanied Spanish and Portuguese expansion in the Americas, Africa, and Asia; some became closely associated with colonial rule, while others emphasized accommodation to local cultures. Protestant overseas missions developed more slowly after the Reformation but expanded greatly from the 18th and 19th centuries. Missionary societies such as the Baptist Missionary Society and the Church Mission Society, along with figures including William Carey and Hudson Taylor, became prominent in this period. Missionaries also founded schools, hospitals, and other institutions, while their relationship with European imperial expansion varied from cooperation to tension and opposition.

Modern Christian mission takes many forms. Protestant and evangelical missions have often emphasized evangelism, church planting, indigenous leadership, and the creation of self-supporting and self-propagating churches. Catholic understandings of mission likewise include preaching and establishing Christian communities, while modern Catholic missiology has placed increasing emphasis on inculturation and relations with non-Christian religions. Missionary organizations also use Bible translation, radio, printed literature, and digital media. As the geographical center of World Christianity has shifted away from Europe and North America, countries in Africa, Asia, and Latin America have become important sources as well as recipients of missionaries, and migration has produced what has been termed "reverse mission" to the West.

Christian missions have had wide-ranging social and cultural effects and have also been the subject of sustained criticism. Missionaries established schools, hospitals, literacy projects, and health programs in many countries, and missionary linguists documented and translated local languages. At the same time, missions have been linked to colonialism, attempts to replace indigenous cultures, and the transmission of infectious diseases to populations lacking immunity. Proselytism has also caused political and religious conflict, particularly where critics allege coercion, inducements, or the use of humanitarian assistance to encourage conversion. Christian organizations themselves differ over whether evangelism should accompany disaster relief and other aid. Missionaries have in turn faced legal restrictions, hostility, and violence in some countries.

== History of Christian missions ==
The earliest Christian mission, the result of the Great Commission and of the Dispersion of the Apostles, was active within Second Temple Judaism. Whether a Jewish proselytism existed or not that would have served as a model for the early Christians is unclear. (Note: See Circumcision controversy in early Christianity#Background for details.)

Soon, the expansion of the Christian mission beyond Judaism to those who were not Jewish became a contested issue, notably at the Council of Jerusalem (c. 48 to 50). The Apostle Paul, an early proponent of expansion among the "Gentiles", contextualized the Christian message for the Greek and Roman cultures, allowing it to reach beyond its Hebrew and Jewish roots.

Other key figures in the New Testament also played significant roles in the early spread of Christianity. Barnabas, known as the "son of encouragement," supported Paul in his early missionary journeys, fostering the growth of Christian communities (Acts 11:24). Peter preached to the Jewish community in Jerusalem, emphasizing repentance and baptism (Acts 2:38). Philip, one of the seven deacons, spread Christianity beyond Jerusalem, notably in Samaria, where his preaching and miracles led many to believe (Acts 8:5). Thomas (John 20:24–29) is traditionally believed to have traveled to India, establishing Christian communities that remain influential in South India. Apollos, a skilled speaker from Alexandria, proclaimed Christ and strengthened believers in Ephesus and Corinth (Acts 18:24–25).

A major early center of Christianity, the Coptic Church (traditionally founded c. 42 AD) in Alexandria (in present-day Egypt) has the reputation of spreading the faith as far afield as Switzerland, Abyssinia and India, influencing Mesopotamia, Persia, Rome, and Ireland.

From Late Antiquity onward, much missionary activity was carried out by members of religious orders. Monasteries followed disciplines and supported missions, libraries, and practical research, all of which the Church perceived as works to reduce human misery and suffering and to glorify the Christian God. For example, Nestorian communities evangelized in parts of Central Asia, as well as in Tibet, China, and India. Cistercians evangelized much of Northern Europe, as well as developing most of European agriculture's classic techniques. St Patrick (fl. c. 5th century) evangelized many in Ireland. St David was active in Wales.

During the Middle Ages, Ramon Llull advanced the concept of preaching to Muslims and converting them to Christianity by means of non-violent argument. A vision for large-scale mission to Muslims would die with him, not to be revived until the 19th century.

=== Medieval ===
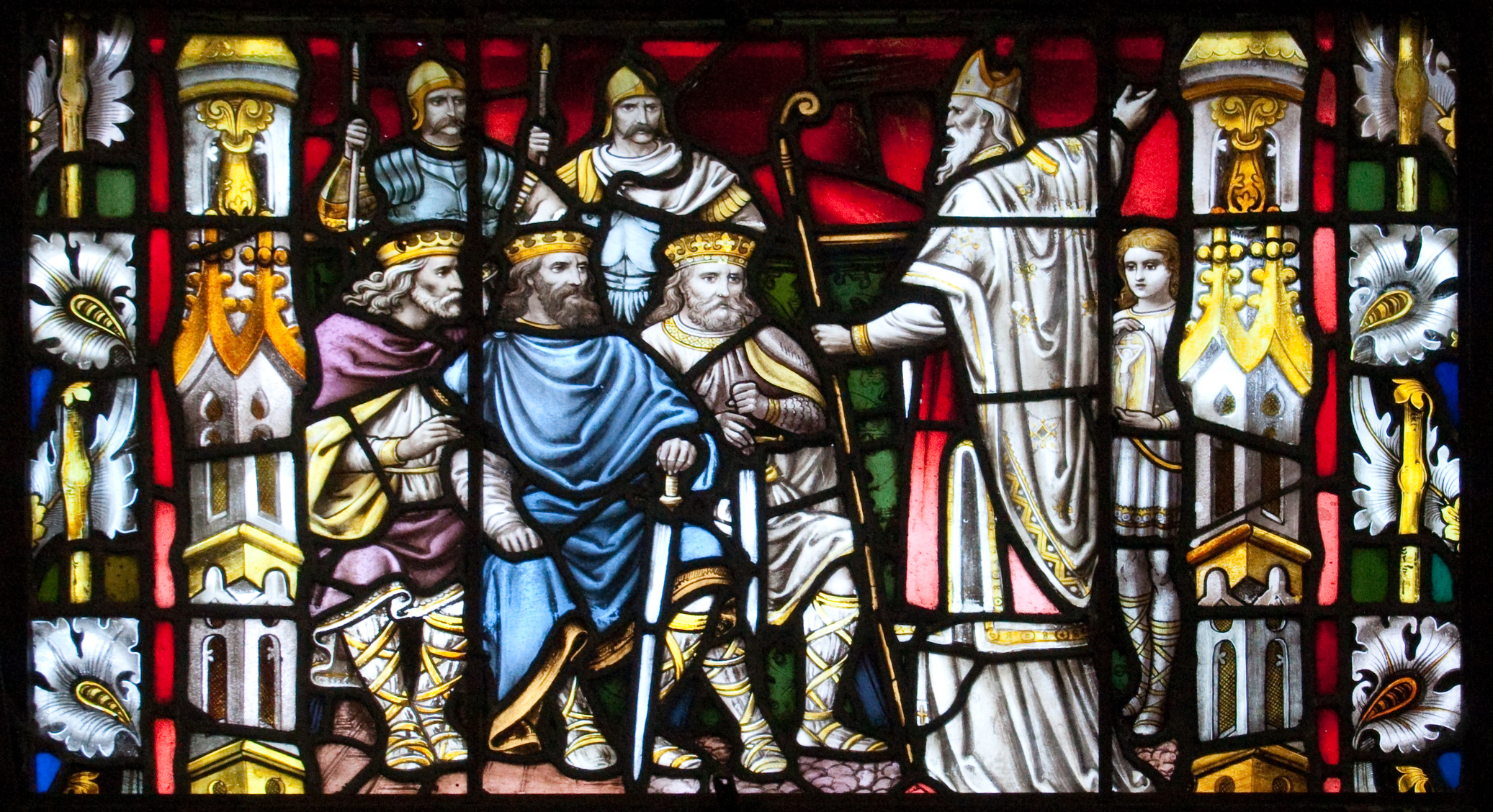
Stained-glass window in Carlow Cathedral, showing Saint Patrick preaching to Irish kings

During the Middle Ages, Christian monasteries and missionaries such as Saint Patrick, and Adalbert of Prague ( c. 956 – 997) propagated learning and religion beyond the boundaries of the old Roman Empire. In the seventh century Gregory the Great sent missionaries, including Augustine of Canterbury, into England, and in the eighth century English Christians, notably Saint Boniface, spread Christianity into Germany. The Hiberno-Scottish mission began in 563, ultimately sparking the Anglo-Saxon mission which evangelised in Francia in the 8th century. Military-religious orders operated in the Baltic regions of the Northern Crusades, spreading Catholicism at the expense of heathenism and Eastern Orthodoxy.

In the late thirteenth and early fourteenth centuries, Franciscans such as William of Rubruck, John of Montecorvino, and Giovanni ed' Magnolia were sent as missionaries to the Near and Far East. Their travels took them as far as China in an attempt to convert the advancing Mongols, especially the Great Khans of the Mongol Empire. In the later part of the fifteenth century, Portuguese missionaries had success in spreading Christianity to the Kingdom of Kongo in West Africa. In 1491, King João I of Kongo converted to Christianity and his nobility and peasants followed suit. The Kongo kingdom remained Christian for the next two centuries.

=== Catholic missions after 1492 ===
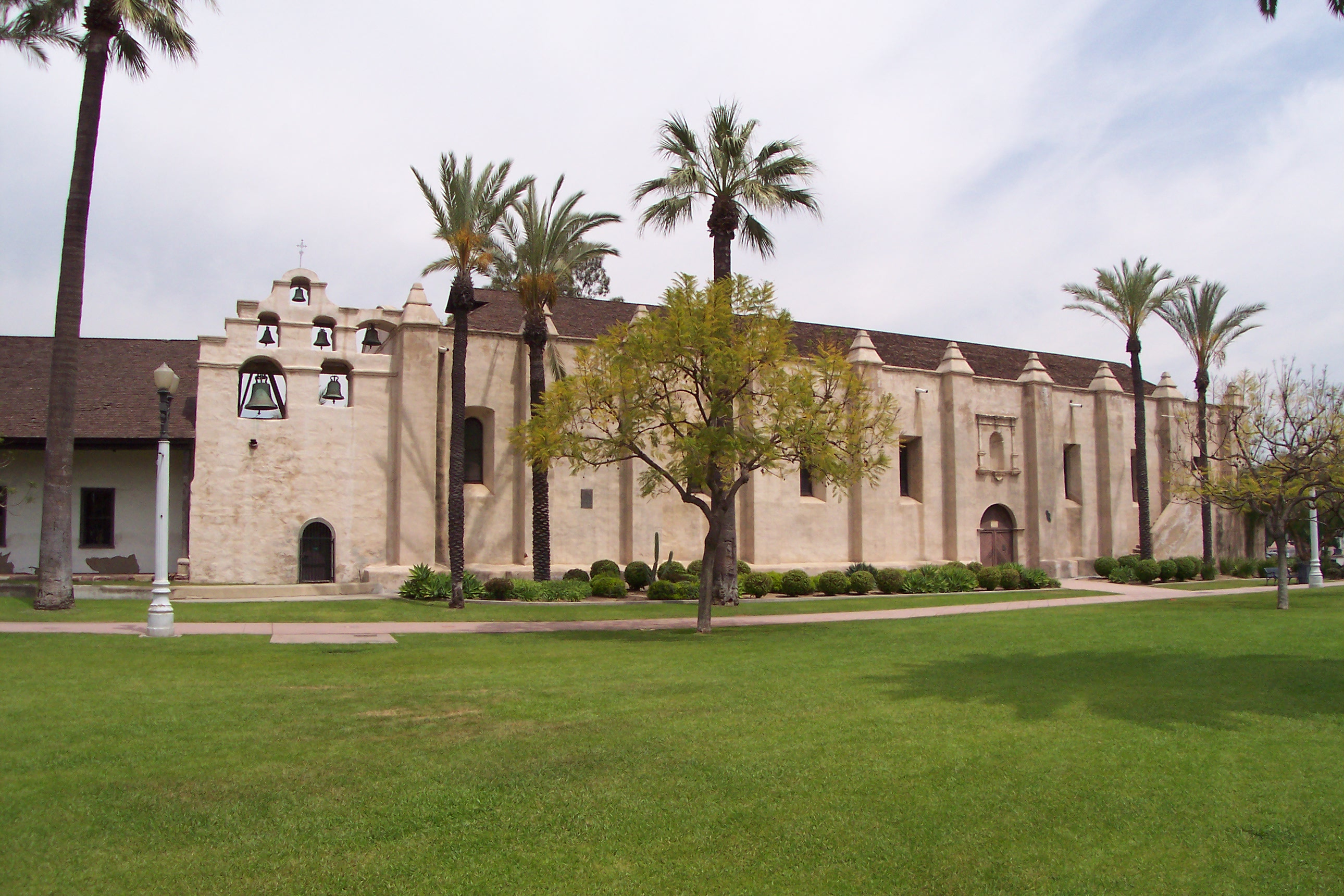
The Mission San Gabriel Arcángel in San Gabriel, California

One of the main stated goals of the Christopher Columbus expedition financed by Queen Isabella of Spain was to spread Christianity. During the Age of Discovery, Spain and Portugal established many missions in their American and Asian colonies. The most active orders were the Jesuits (founded in 1540), Augustinians, Franciscans and Dominicans. The Portuguese sent missions into Africa. These are some of the most well-known missions in history. While some of these missions were associated with imperialism and oppression, others (notably Matteo Ricci's Jesuit mission to China) were relatively peaceful and focused on inculturation rather than on cultural imperialism.

In Renaissance Portugal and Spain, religion formed an integral part of the state, and evangelization was seen as having both secular and spiritual benefits. Wherever these powers attempted to expand their territories or influence, missionaries would soon follow. By the 1494 Treaty of Tordesillas, the two powers divided the world between them into exclusive spheres of influence, trade and colonization. The proselytization of mainland Asia became linked to Portuguese colonial policy.

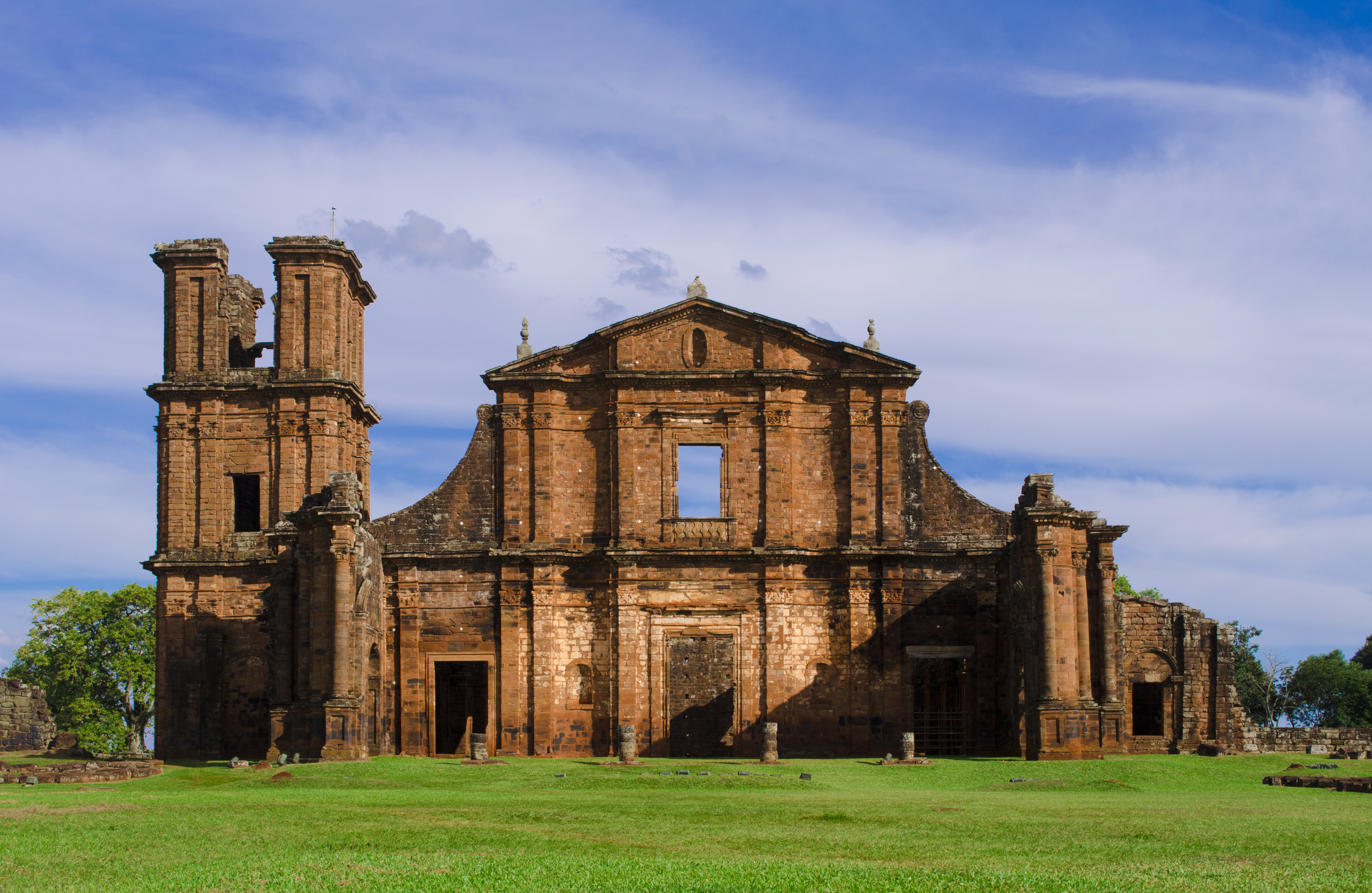
The Spanish Jesuit mission of São Miguel das Missões, Brazil

From 1499 onward, Portuguese trade with Asia rapidly proved profitable. Jesuits arrived in India around 1541, and the Portuguese colonial government in Goa supported the mission with incentives for baptized Christians. Beginning in 1552, the Church sent Jesuits to China and to other countries in Asia.

During the time of the Holland (Batavia) Mission (1592–1853), when the Roman Catholic church in the northern Netherlands was suppressed, there were neither parishes nor dioceses, and the country effectively became a mission area in which congregations were called "stations" (staties). Statie, usually called a clandestine church in English, refers to both the congregation's church and its seat or location.

=== Protestant missions ===
The Reformation unfolded in Europe in the early 16th century. For over a hundred years, occupied by their struggle with the Catholic Church, the early Protestant churches as a body were not strongly focused on missions to "heathen" lands. Instead, the focus was initially more on Christian lands in the hope to spread the Protestant faith there, identifying the papacy with the Antichrist.

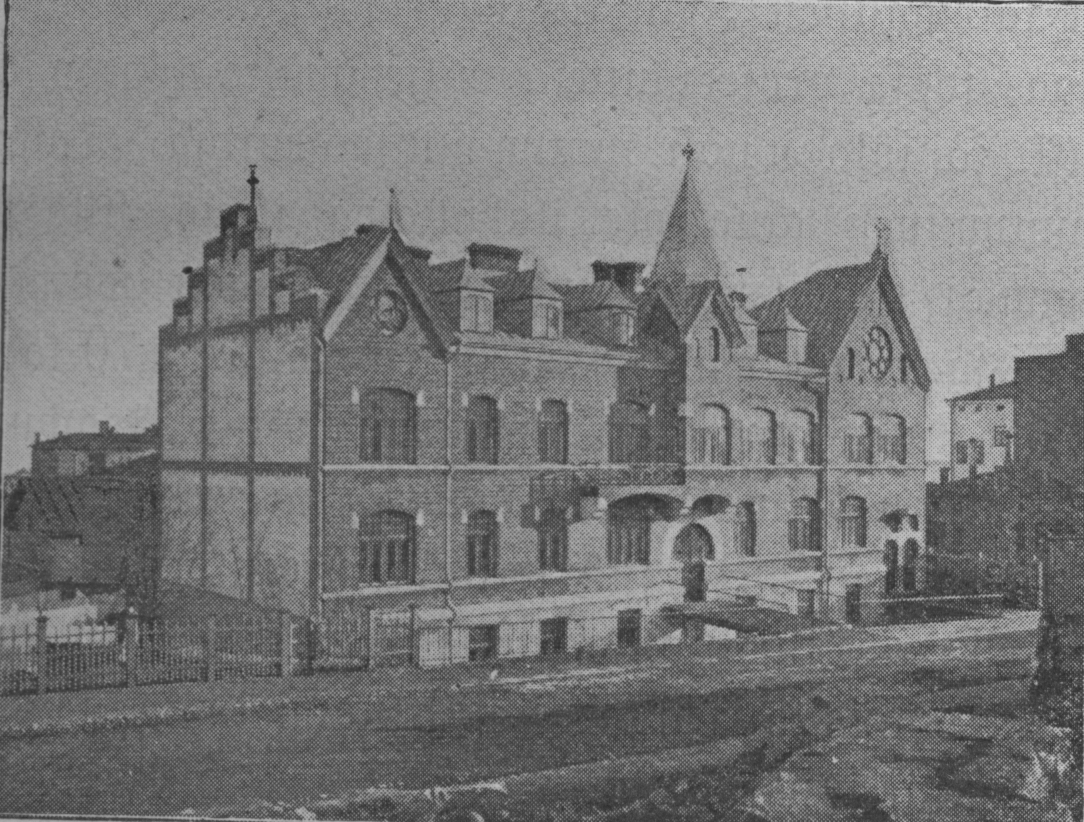
Lähetystalo, the office and church building of the Finnish Evangelical Lutheran Mission in Ullanlinna, Helsinki, Finland in 1903

In the centuries that followed, Protestant churches began sending out missionaries in increasing numbers, spreading the proclamation of the Christian message to previously unreached people. In North America, missionaries to the Native Americans included Jonathan Edwards (1703–1758), the well-known preacher of the Great Awakening of c. 1731 to 1755), who in his later years retired from the very public life of his early career. He became a missionary to the Housatonic Native Americans (1751) and a staunch advocate for them against cultural imperialism.

As European culture became established in the midst of indigenous peoples outside Europe, the cultural distance between Christians of differing cultures has been difficult to overcome. One early solution was the creation of segregated "praying towns" of Christian natives. This pattern of grudging acceptance of converts played out again later in Hawaii when Congregational missionaries from New England went there and converted the native population, including the royalty. In the course of the Spanish colonization of the Americas, the Catholic missionaries learned the languages of the Amerindians and devised writing systems for them. Then they preached to indigenous people in those languages (Quechua, Guarani, Nahuatl) instead of in Spanish, to keep Indians away from "sinful" whites. An extreme case of segregation occurred in the Guarani Reductions, a theocratic semi-independent region established by the Jesuits in the region of the future Paraguay between the early 17th century and 1767.

From 1732 onwards the Moravian Church began sending out missionaries.

In the United States, the American Board of Commissioners for Foreign Missions (ABCFM) was chartered in 1812.

Protestant missionaries from the Anglican, Lutheran and Presbyterian traditions starting arriving in what was then the Ottoman Empire in the first half of the 19th Century. This eventually let to the creation of what are today the Evangelical Lutheran Church in Jordan and the Holy Land and the see of the Anglican Bishop in Jerusalem. Furthermore, it was during this time that the Christian and Missionary Alliance started their missionary activity in Jerusalem.

==== Methodist missions ====
Thomas Coke (1747–1814), the first bishop of the American Methodists, was "the Father of Methodist Missions". After spending time in the newly-formed United States of America strengthening the infant Methodist Church alongside Episcopal colleague Francis Asbury, the British-born Coke left for mission work. During his time in America, Coke worked vigorously to increase Methodist support of Christian missions and of raising up mission workers. Coke died while on a mission trip to India, but his legacy among Methodists – his passion for missions – continues.

==== Baptist missions ====
Missionary organizations favored the development of the Baptist movement on all continents. Twelve ministers founded the Baptist Missionary Society in 1792 at Kettering in England.

William Carey wrote a pamphlet in 1792, "An Enquiry into the Obligation of Christians to use Means for the Conversion of Heathen" and became the first missionary of the Baptist Missionary Society. He went to Calcutta (Kolkata) in 1793. Far from a dry book of theology, Carey's work used the best available geographic and ethnographic data to map and count the number of people who had never heard the Gospel. He has been referred to as the "father of modern missions", and as "India's first cultural anthropologist".

In the United States, "Hard Shell Baptists", "Anti-Mission Baptists", or "Old School Baptists" adhering to strict Calvinism rejected all mission boards, Bible tract societies, and temperance societies as non-biblical. This faction was strongest in the American South. The mainstream of the Baptist denomination, however, supported missionary work, by the founding of International Ministries in 1814 and of the International Mission Board in 1845.

=== China ===
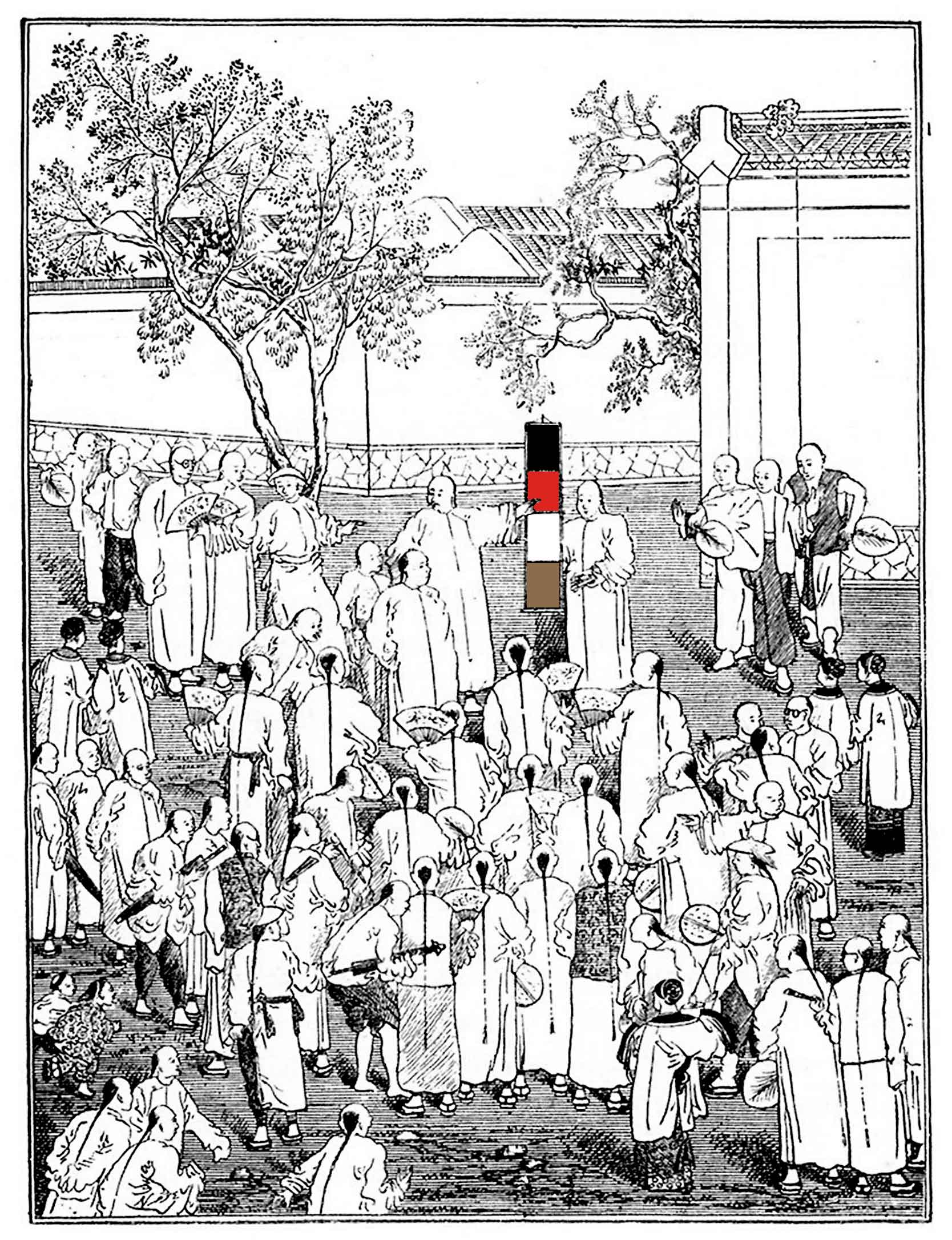
Missionary preaching in China using The Wordless Book

A wave of missions, starting in the early 1850s, targeted inland areas of China, led by a Briton Hudson Taylor (1832–1905) with his China Inland Mission (1865– ). Taylor was later supported by Henry Grattan Guinness (1835–1910) who founded (1883) Cliff College, which continues as of 2014 to train and equip for local and global mission.

The missions inspired by Taylor and Guinness have collectively been called "faith missions" and owe much to the ideas and example of Anthony Norris Groves (1795–1853). Taylor, a thorough-going nativist, offended the missionaries of his era by wearing Chinese clothing and speaking Chinese at home. His books, speaking, and examples led to the formation of numerous inland missions and of the Student Volunteer Movement (SVM, founded in 1886), which from 1850 to about 1950 sent nearly 10,000 missionaries to inland areas, often at great personal sacrifice. Many early SVM missionaries traveling to areas with endemic tropical diseases left with their belongings packed in a coffin, aware that 80% of them would die within two years.

Missionary activity in China was undertaken by the Protestant churches, as well as by the French Catholic Church. According to John K. Fairbank:

The opening of the country in the 1860s facilitated the great effort to Christianize China. Building on old foundations, the Roman Catholic establishment totaled by 1894 some 750 European missionaries, 400 native priests, and over half a million communicants. By 1894 the newer Protestant mission effort supported over 1300 missionaries, mainly British and American, and maintained some 500 stations-each with a church, residences, street chapels, and usually a small school and possibly a hospital or dispensary-in about 350 different cities and towns. Yet they had made fewer than 60,000 Chinese Christian converts.

There was limited success in terms of converts and establishing schools in a nation of about 400 million people, but there was escalating anger at the threat of cultural imperialism. The main result was the Boxer Rebellion (1899–1901), in which missions were attacked and thousands of Chinese Christians were massacred in order to destroy Western influences. Some Europeans were killed and many others threatened, Britain joined the other powers in a military invasion that suppressed the Boxers.

=== British Empire ===
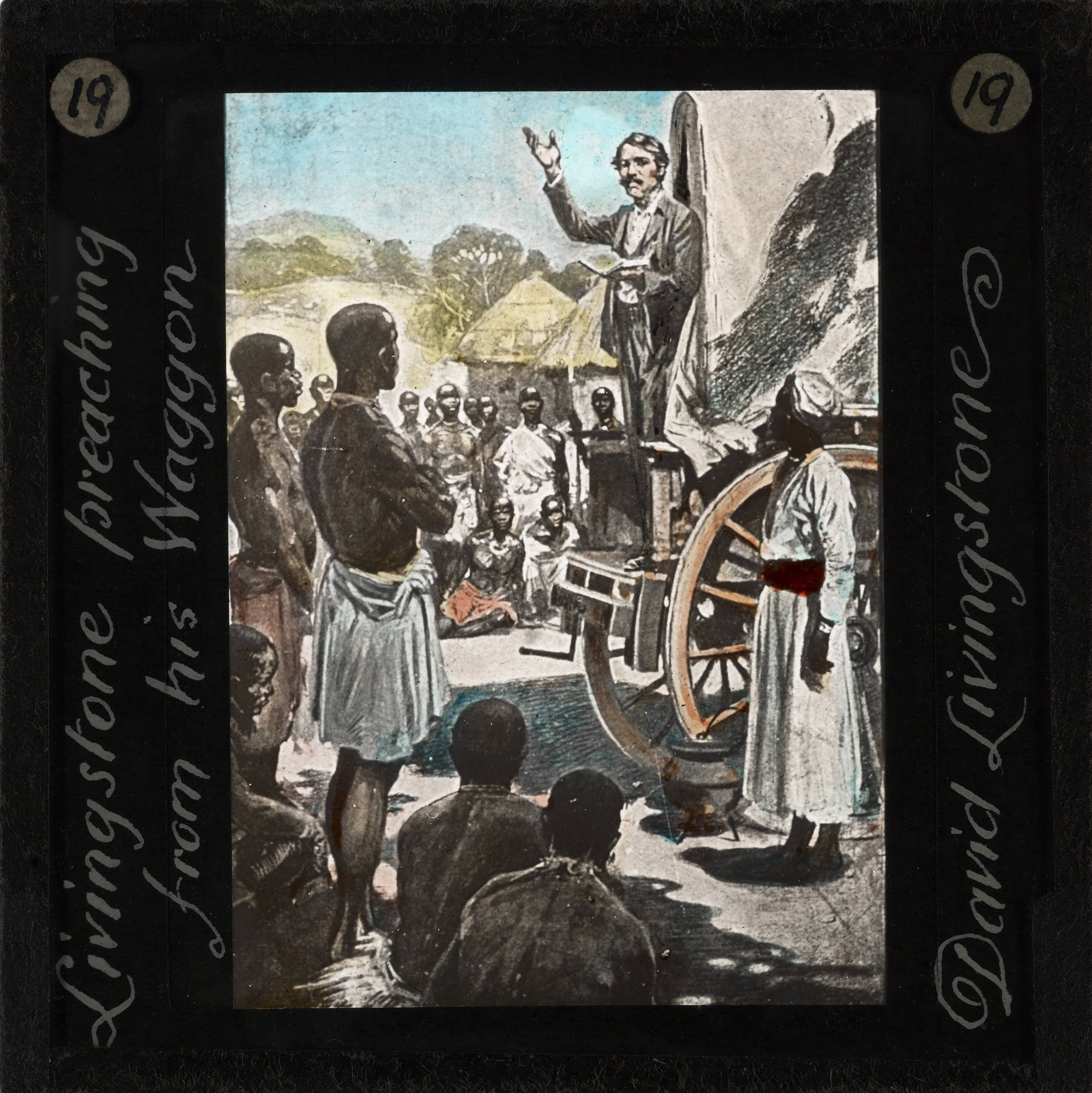
David Livingstone preaching from his wagon in Africa

In the 18th century, and even more so in the 19th century, missionaries based in Britain saw the expanding British Empire and potential British colonies and protectorates as a fertile field for proselytizing for Christianity. All the main denominations were involved, including the Church of England, Scottish Presbyterian, and Nonconformists. Much of the enthusiasm emerged from the Evangelical revival. Within the Church of England, the Church Mission Society (CMS) originated in 1799 and went on to undertake activity all around the world, including in what became known as "the Middle East".

Before the American Revolution of the late-18th century, British Anglican and Methodist missionaries were active in the Thirteen Colonies. The Methodists, led by George Whitefield (1714–1770), were the most successful, and after the Revolution an entirely distinct American Methodist denomination emerged that became the largest Protestant denomination in the United States. A major problem for British colonial officials was the demand of the Church of England to set up an American bishop; this was strongly opposed by most of the Americans colonists, as it had never happened before. Colonial officials increasingly took a neutral position on religious matters, even in those colonies such as Virginia, where the Church of England was officially established but in practice controlled by laymen in the local vestries. After the American War of Independence of 1775 to 1783, colonial officials decided to enhance the power and wealth of the Church of England in all remaining British colonies, including in British North America.

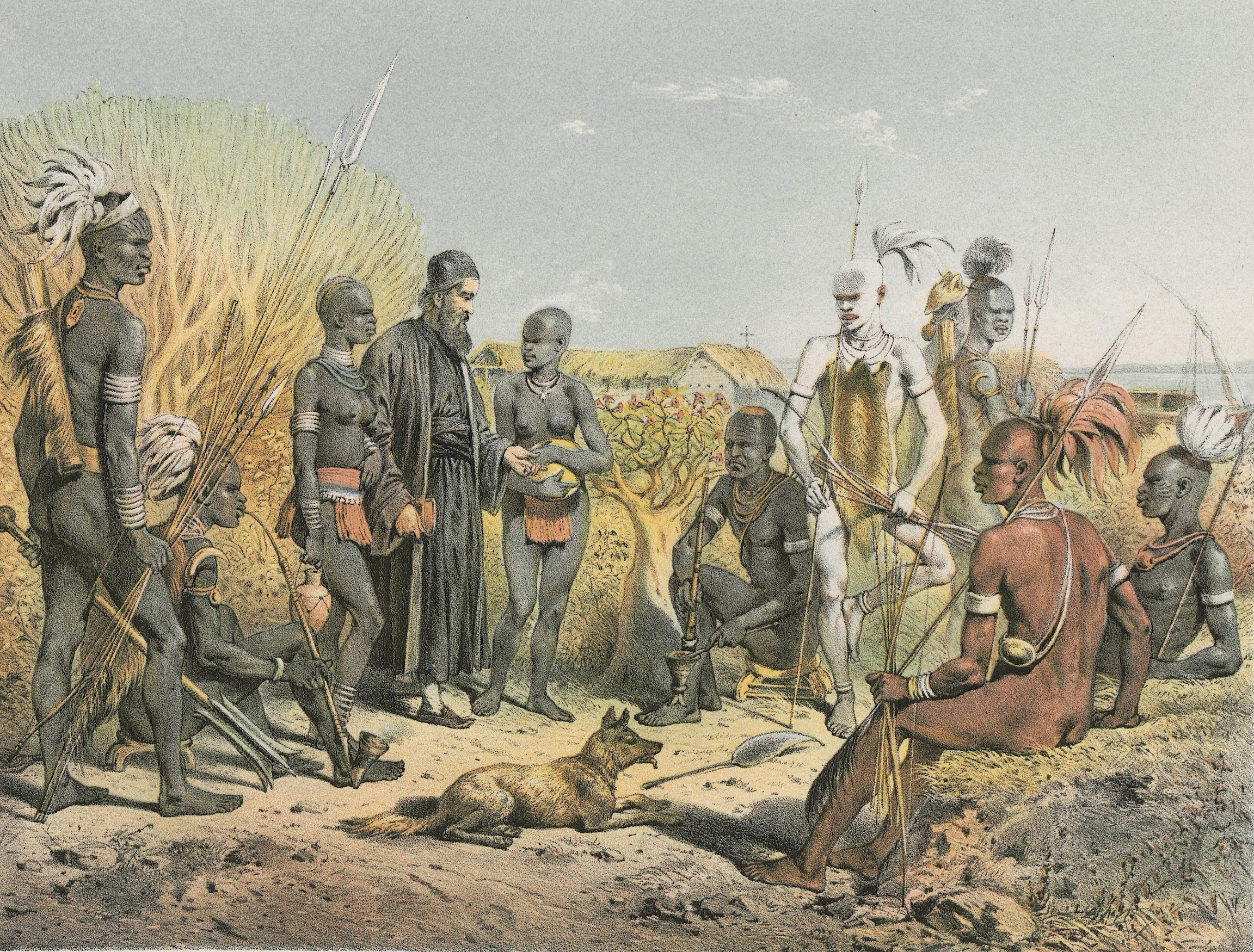
A group of Bari talking with a European missionary, c. 1860

Missionary societies funded their own operations that were not supervised or directed by the British Colonial Office bureaucracy. Tensions emerged between the missionaries and the colonial officials. The latter feared that missionaries might stir up trouble or encourage "natives" to challenge colonial authority. In general, colonial officials were much more comfortable with working with the established local leadership, including the native religions, rather than introducing the divisive force of Christianity. This proved especially troublesome in India, were very few local élites were attracted to Christianity. In Africa, especially, the missionaries made many converts: at the start of the twenty-first century there were more Anglicans in Nigeria than in England.

Christian missions in Australia played a part both in indoctrinating Aboriginal Australians into Christianity, and in controlling their movements and removing children from families, leading to the Stolen Generations. German missionaries ran Lutheran and other mission stations and schools from the earliest days of European colonisation of Australia. One of the largest organisations was the United Aborigines Mission, which ran dozens of missionaries and stations in Western Australia, New South Wales and South Australia in the 1900s.

Anglican, Wesleyan and Roman Catholic missions operated in New Zealand from 1814, initially with few conversion successes. Work on acculturation and the development of a written script bore fruit, and Māori joined mainline denominations and developed their own proselytising versions of Christianity (Pai Mārire, Ringatū, Rātana). Missionaries played a part in aiding the establishment of British sovereignty in 1840.

Missionaries increasingly came to focus on education, medical help, and long-term modernization of the native personality to inculcate European middle-class values. They established schools and medical clinics. Christian missionaries played a public role, especially in promoting sanitation and public health. Many were trained as physicians, or took special courses in public health and tropical medicine at Livingstone College, London.

=== After 1870 ===
By the 1870s, Protestant missions around the world generally acknowledged that the long-term material goal was the formation of independent, self-governing, self-supporting, self-propagating churches. The rise of nationalism in the Third World provoked challenges from critics who complained that the missionaries were teaching Western ways and ignoring the indigenous culture. The Boxer Rebellion in China in 1899–1901 involved bloody attacks on Christian missions and especially on their converts. The First World War (1914–1918) diverted resources, and pulled most Germans out of missionary work when that country lost its empire. The worldwide Great Depression of the 1930s was a major blow to funding mission activities.

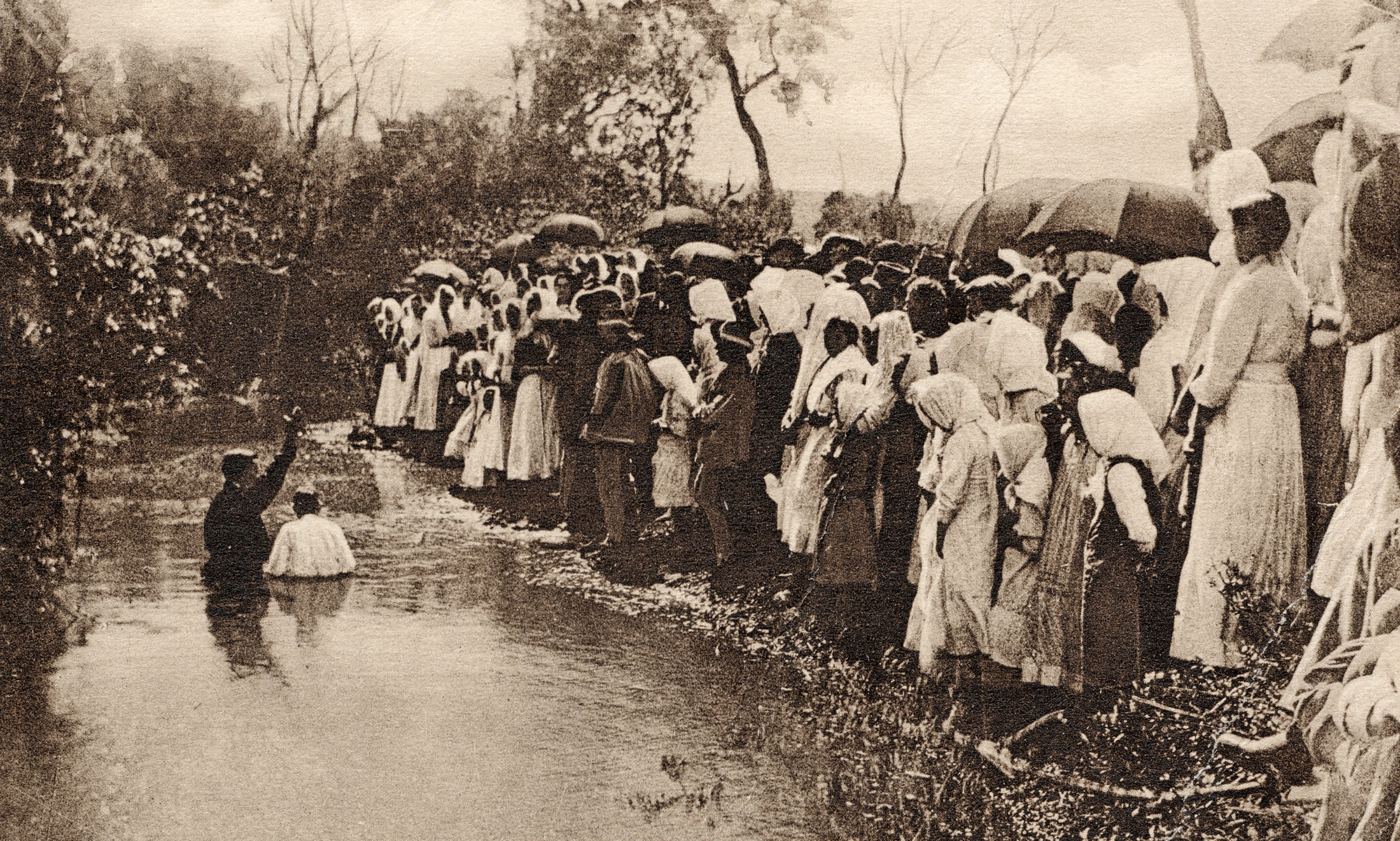
Swedish Baptist missionary Erik Jansson from the Örebro Mission at work in Brazil, c. 1910

In 1910, the Edinburgh Missionary Conference, presided over by active SVM and YMCA leader John R. Mott(an American Methodist layperson), reviewed the state of evangelism, Bible translation, mobilization of church support, and the training of indigenous leadership. Looking to the future, conferees worked on strategies for worldwide evangelism and cooperation. The conference not only established greater ecumenical cooperation in missions, but also essentially launched the modern ecumenical movement.

The next wave of missions was started by two missionaries, Cameron Townsend and Donald McGavran, around 1935. These men realized that although earlier missionaries had reached geographic areas, there were numerous ethnographic groups that were isolated by language, or class from the groups that missionaries had reached. Cameron formed Wycliffe Bible Translators to translate the Bible into native languages. McGavran concentrated on finding bridges to cross the class and cultural barriers in places like India, which has upwards of 4,600 separate peoples, separated by combinations of language, culture, and caste. Despite democratic reforms, caste and class differences are still fundamental in many cultures.

An equally important dimension of missions strategy is the indigenous method of nationals reaching their own people. In Asia this wave of missions was pioneered by men like Dr G. D. James of Singapore, Rev Theodore Williams of India and Dr David Cho of Korea. The "two thirds missions movement" as it is referred to, is today a major force in missions.

Often, missionaries provide welfare and health services, as a good deed or as a means of making friends with locals. Thousands of schools, orphanages, and hospitals have been established by missions. One service provided by missionaries was the Each one, teach one literacy program begun by Dr. Frank Laubach in the Philippines in 1935. The program has since spread around the world and brought literacy to the least-enabled members of many societies.

During this period missionaries, especially evangelical and Pentecostal missionaries, witnessed a substantial increase in the number of conversions of Muslims to Christianity. In an interview published in 2013 a leader of a key missionary agency focused on Muslims claimed that the world is living in a "day of salvation for Muslims everywhere".

Theologically conservative evangelical, Pentecostal, Adventist and Mormon missionaries typically avoid cultural imperialism, and focus on spreading the gospel and translating the Bible. In the process of translating local languages, missionaries have often been vital in preserving and documenting the culture of the peoples among whom they live.

The word "mission" was historically often applied to the building, the "mission station" in which the missionary lives or works. In some colonies, these mission stations became a focus of settlement of displaced or formerly nomadic people. Particularly in rural Australia, mission stations (known as "missions") became home to many Indigenous Australians.

== Contemporary concepts of mission ==
=== Sending and receiving nations ===
Major nations not only send and fund missionaries abroad, but also receive them from other countries. In 2010, the United States sent out 127,000 missionaries, while 32,400 came to the United States. Brazil was second, sending out 34,000, and receiving 20,000. France sent out 21,000 and received 10,000. Britain sent out 15,000 and received 10,000. India sent out 10,000 and received 8000. Other major exporters included Spain at 21,000 sent out, Italy at 20,000, South Korea at 20,000, Germany at 14,000, and Canada at 8,500. Large recipient nations included Russia, receiving 20,000; Congo receiving 15,000; South Africa, 12,000; Argentina, 10,000; and Chile, 8,500. The largest sending agency in the United States is the Church of Jesus Christ of Latter-Day Saints who, at this date 2026, has 90,000 full time proselytizing young missionaries all over the world with many more elder missionaries serving in similar circumstances. The Southern Baptist Convention, has 4,800 missionaries, plus 450 support staff working inside the United States. The annual budget is about $50,000 per year per missionary. In recent years, however, the Southern Baptist foreign missionary operation (the International Mission Board) has operated at a deficit, and it is cutting operations by 15 percent. It is encouraging older missionaries to retire and return to the United States.

=== Modern missionary methods and conservative Protestant doctrines ===
The Lausanne Congress of 1974 birthed a movement that supports evangelical mission among non-Christians and nominal Christians. It regards "mission" as that which is designed "to form a viable indigenous church-planting and world changing movement." This definition is motivated by a theologically imperative theme of the Bible to make God known, as outlined in the Great Commission. The definition is claimed to summarize the acts of Jesus' ministry, which is taken as a model motivation for all ministries.

This Christian missionary movement seeks to implement churches after the pattern of the first century Apostles. The process of forming disciples is necessarily social. Church should be understood in the widest sense, as a body of believers of Christ rather than simply a building. In this view, even those who are already culturally Christian must be "evangelized".

Church planting by cross-cultural missionaries leads to the establishment of self-governing, self-supporting and self-propagating communities of believers. This is the famous "three-self" formula formulated by Henry Venn of the London Church Missionary Society in the 19th century. Cross-cultural missionaries are persons who accept church-planting duties to evangelize people outside their culture, as Christ commanded in the Great Commission (Matthew 28:18–20, Mark 16:15–18).

The objective of these missionaries is to give an understandable presentation of their beliefs with the hope that people will choose to following the teaching of Jesus Christ and live their lives as His disciples. As a matter of strategy, many evangelical Christians around the world now focus on what they call the 10/40 window, a band of countries between 10 and 40 degrees north latitude and reaching from western Africa through Asia. Christian missions strategist Luis Bush pinpointed the need for a major focus of evangelism in the 10/40 window, a phrase he coined in his presentation at the missionary conference Lausanne 1989 in Manila. Sometimes referred to as the "Resistant Belt", it is an area that includes 35% of the world's land mass, 90% of the world's poorest peoples and 95% of those who have yet to hear anything about Christianity.

Modern mission techniques are sufficiently refined that within ten to fifteen years, most indigenous churches are locally pastored, managed, taught, self-supporting and evangelizing. The process can be substantially faster if a preexisting translation of the Bible and higher pastoral education are already available, perhaps left over from earlier, less effective missions.

One strategy is to let indigenous cultural groups decide to adopt Christian doctrines and benefits, when (as in most cultures) such major decisions are normally made by groups. In this way, opinion leaders in the groups can persuade much or most of the groups to convert. When combined with training in discipleship, church planting and other modern missionary doctrine, the result is an accelerating, self-propelled conversion of large portions of the culture.

==== Christian ministries ====
A typical modern mission is a co-operative effort by many different ministries, often including several coordinating ministries, such as the Faith2Share network, often with separate funding sources.

Christian ministry is the vocational work of living and teaching about faith, in the hopes of increasing the church doing things to people. The Cyclopedia of Biblical, Theological, and Ecclesiastical Literature defines Christian ministry as "to denote a devotion to the interests of God's cause, and, in a technical sense, the work of advancing the Redeemer's kingdom". All ministry may fall under the call of, the Great Commission, that Jesus presented to his disciples to continue the spread of the Gospel.

While the spread of the Gospel is every believer's purpose, the primary and only vocation of the bible is to live a life aligned with God, as his children, towards the purpose of displaying the love of Jesus through one's actions and decisions. Some see vocation as one's true calling professionally, yet others see it as a furthering of God's kingdom not the occupation, like Maitland states "the work itself is not the vocation". Vocation calls Christian ministry to reach all aspects of ones life, a way of life many believe. In short, Christian ministry, as a whole, is any vocational work done for the sake of the Great Commission.

Someone's ministry is shaped by what they feel called to do. Vocation can be any activity as a whole, or specific activities, or organizations within a church dedicated to specific activities. Some ministries are identified formally as such, and some are not; some ministry is directed towards members of the church, and some towards non-members.

One typical effort proceeded as follows:

1. A missionary radio group recruits, trains and broadcasts in the main dialect of the target culture's language. Broadcast content is carefully adapted to avoid syncretism yet help the Christian Gospel seem like a native, normal part of the target culture. Broadcast content often includes news, music, entertainment and education in the language, as well as purely Christian items.
2. Broadcasts might advertise programs, inexpensive radios (possibly spring-wound), and a literature ministry that sells a Christian mail-order correspondence course at nominal costs. The literature ministry is key, and is normally a separate organization from the radio ministry. Modern literature missions are shifting to web-based content where it makes sense (as in Western Europe and Japan).
3. When a person or group completes a correspondence course, they are invited to contact a church-planting missionary group from (if possible) a related cultural group. The church-planting ministry is usually a different ministry from either the literature or radio ministries. The church-planting ministry usually requires its missionaries to be fluent in the target language, and trained in modern church-planting techniques.
4. The missionary then leads the group to start a church. Churches planted by these groups are usually a group that meets in a house. The object is the minimum organization that can perform the required character development and spiritual growth. Buildings, complex ministries and other expensive items are mentioned, but deprecated until the group naturally achieves the size and budget to afford them. The crucial training is how to become a Christian (by faith in Jesus Christ) and then how to set up a church (meet to study the Bible, and perform communion and worship), usually in that order.
5. A new generation of churches is created, and the growth begins to accelerate geometrically. Frequently, daughter churches are created only a few months after a church's creation. In the fastest-growing Christian movements, the pastoral education is "pipelined", flowing in a just-in-time fashion from the central churches to daughter churches. That is, planting of churches does not wait for the complete training of pastors.

The most crucial part of church planting is selection and training of leadership. Classically, leadership training required an expensive stay at a seminary, a Bible college. Modern church planters deprecate this because it substantially slows the growth of the church without much immediate benefit. Modern mission doctrines replace the seminary with programmed curricula or (even less expensive) books of discussion questions, and access to real theological books. The materials are usually made available in a major trading language in which most native leaders are likely to be fluent. In some cases, the materials can be adapted for oral use.

It turns out that new pastors' practical needs for theology are well addressed by a combination of practical procedures for church planting, discussion in small groups, and motivated Bible-based study from diverse theological texts. As a culture's church's wealth increases, it will naturally form classic seminaries on its own.

Another related mission is Bible translation. The above-mentioned literature has to be translated. Missionaries actively experiment with advanced linguistic techniques to speed translation and literacy. Bible translation not only speeds a church's growth by aiding self-training, but it also assures that Christian information becomes a permanent part of the native culture and literature. Some ministries also use modern recording techniques to reach groups with audio that could not be soon reached with literature.

=== Among Catholics ===
For Catholics, "Missions" is the term given to those particular undertakings by which the heralds of the Gospel, sent out by the Church and going forth into the whole world, carry out the task of preaching the Gospel and planting the Church among peoples or groups who do not yet believe in Christ.

Vatican II made a deep impact on Catholic missions around the world. The Church's relations to non-Christian religions like Judaism and Islam were revisited.

A steep decline in the number of people entering the priesthood and religious life in the West has made the Church look towards laity more and more. Communities like Opus Dei arose to meet this need.

Inculturation increasingly became a key topic of missiological reflection for Catholics. Inculturation is understood as the meeting of the Christian message with a community in their cultural context.

Liberation Theology and liturgical reform have also been important in forming and influencing the mission of the Catholic Church in the 20th and 21st Centuries.

In relation to mission, Pope Benedict XVI made the re-evangelization of Europe and North America a priority in his own ministry, even while the upper leadership of the Catholic Church hierarchy and the college of cardinals has more members from Latin America, Africa, and Asia than ever before.

Key documents on mission for Catholics during this period are Evangelii nuntiandi by Pope Paul VI and Redemptoris missio by Pope John Paul II.

=== Print and new media in mission ===
Christian mission organisations have long depended on the printed word as a channel through which to do mission. At times when countries have been "closed" to Christians, great efforts have been made to smuggle Bibles and other literature into those countries. Brother Andrew, the founder of Open Doors, started smuggling Bibles into communist countries in the 1950s. Operation Mobilisation was established in 1957 by George Verwer. Other Christian publishers, such as Plough Publishing, provide free books to people in the UK and US as a form of mission. The Bible Society translates and prints Bibles, in an attempt to reach every country in the world.

The internet now provides Christian mission organisations a convent way of reaching people in the form of podcasts. Podcasts provide a way of dissemination for a message that has potential to endanger the recipient, since it is very hard to track who has downloaded a specific podcast. An example of this is the Crescent Project. Other podcasts, such as the Life Together podcast, The Sacred, and Harvest are aimed at both non-Christians and Christians in the home country.

=== Reverse mission ===
The shift in world Christian population from Europe and North America to the non-Western world, and the migration of Africans, Asians, and Latin Americans to the West has given rise to what some have termed "reverse mission". It demonstrates a reversal of the missionary movement, in that it reverses the direction of earlier missionary efforts.

=== Inter-organizational missions ===
Globalization of the 21st century has served as a platform for opportunity for independent Christian organizations to unite together in cooperation for outreach missions and discipleship.

Some organizations are Christian consortiums which organizationally band themselves together like 50,000 persons in the Illinois-based Missio Nexus organization led by Ted Esler.

Other organizations are united by a common source of financial funding, cooperation in outreach projects and digital communications between internal missions personnel around the world and their partners like SIM or the various church and non profit ministries associated with the GMNF Global Mission Society. GMNF's founder is Anton Williams of Kalamazoo Michigan who provides direction and support for the organization and its partnerships through Anton Williams Holding Company of also Kalamazoo, Michigan. This missions organization is unique for its use of Dallas Theological Seminary, the largest nondenominational seminary in the world for not only educating personnel but use of material for all aspects of its ministries.

Still other organizations sign legal contacts with an agencies to join for specific functions in missions like the SIMS organization.

== Reception and impacts ==
=== Disease transmission ===
European explorers in the Americas introduced Afro-Eurasian diseases to which Amerindian peoples had no immunity, leading to tens of millions of deaths. Missionaries, along with other travelers, brought diseases into native populations. Smallpox, measles, and common cold, have been blamed on their arrivals. David Igler of the University of California, Irvine, includes missionary activity as a cause of spreading germs. However, he says that commercial traders were the main agents of disease:

other diseases arrived on non-commercial voyages; missionary activities certainly spread germs, and Spanish conquests had dispersed deadly germs in parts of the Americas and Pacific prior to the late eighteenth century. Yet, for the period between the 1770s and the 1840s, trading vessels were the main agents of disease, creating in the Pacific what Emmanuel Le Roy Ladurie has called a "paroxysm" of the "microbian unification of the world". By 1850, the microbes of Europe, Asia, and Africa circulated in almost every Pacific population.

A catastrophe was wrought upon the Amerindians by contact with Europeans. Old World diseases like smallpox, measles, malaria and many others spread through Indian populations. Historian Barry Strauss and the coauthors of "Western Civilization The Continuing Experiment", have stated that, "In most of the New World, 90 percent or more of the native population was destroyed by wave after wave of previously unknown afflictions. Explorers and colonists did not enter an empty land but rather an emptied one".

=== Concerns and tensions over proselytism ===
In 1924, Mahatma Gandhi wrote:

This [Christian] proselytization will mean no peace in the world. Conversions are harmful to India. If I had the power and could legislate I should certainly stop all proselytizing ... It pains me to have to say that the Christian missionaries as a body, with honorable exceptions, have actively supported a system which has impoverished, enervated and demoralized a people considered to be among the gentlest and most civilized on earth.

In India, Hindu organisations such as the Rashtriya Swayamsevak Sangh assert that most conversions undertaken by zealous evangelicals occur due to compulsion, inducement or fraud. In the Indian state of Tripura, the government has alleged financial and weapons-smuggling connections between Baptist missionaries and rebel groups such as the National Liberation Front of Tripura. The accused Tripura Baptist Christian Union is a member body of the Baptist World Alliance.

In mid-May, the Vatican was also co-sponsoring a meeting about how some religious groups abuse liberties by proselytizing, or by evangelizing in aggressive or deceptive ways. Iraq ... has become an open field for foreigners looking for fresh converts. Some Catholic Church leaders and aid organizations have expressed concern about new Christian groups coming in and luring Iraqis to their churches with offers of cash, clothing, food or jobs. ... Reports of aggressive proselytism and reportedly forced conversions in mostly Hindu India have fueled religious tensions and violence there and have prompted some regional governments to pass laws banning proselytism or religious conversion. ... Sadhvi Vrnda Chaitanya, a Hindu monk from southern India, told CNS that India's poor and uneducated are especially vulnerable to coercive or deceptive methods of evangelization. ... Aid work must not hide any ulterior motives and avoid exploiting vulnerable people like children and the disabled, she said.

In a 2006 interview with Outlook magazine, Sadhvi Vrnda Chaitanya said "If the Vatican could understand that every religious and spiritual tradition is as sacred as Christianity, and that they have a right to exist without being denigrated or extinguished, it will greatly serve the interests of dialogue, mutual respect, and peaceful coexistence."

Missionaries say that the government in India has passed anti-conversion laws in several states that are supposedly meant to prevent conversions from "force or allurement", but are primarily used, they say, to persecute and criminalize voluntary conversion due to the government's broad definition of "force and allurement". Any gift received from a Christian in exchange for, or with the intention of, conversion is considered allurement. Voice of the Martyrs reports that aid-workers claim that they are being hindered from reaching people with much needed services as a result of this persecution. Alan de Lastic, Roman Catholic archbishop of New Delhi states that claims of forced conversion are false.

==== Relation with humanitarian aid ====
While there is a general agreement among most major aid organizations not to mix aid with proselyting, others see disasters as a useful opportunity to spread the word. One such an occurrence was the tsunami that devastated parts of Asia on 26 December 2004.

"This [disaster] is one of the greatest opportunities God has given us to share his love with people," said K.P. Yohannan, president of the Texas-based Gospel for Asia. In an interview, Yohannan said his 14,500 "native missionaries" in India, Sri Lanka and the Andaman Islands are giving survivors Bibles and booklets about "how to find hope in this time through the word of God." In Krabi, Thailand, a Southern Baptist church had been "praying for a way to make inroads" with a particular ethnic group of fishermen, according to Southern Baptist relief coordinator Pat Julian. Then came the tsunami, "a phenomenal opportunity" to provide ministry and care, Julian told the Baptist Press news service. ... Not all evangelicals agree with these tactics. "It's not appropriate in a crisis like this to take advantage of people who are hurting and suffering", said the Rev. Franklin Graham, head of Samaritan's Purse and son of evangelist Billy Graham.

Vince Isner, director of FaithfulAmerica.org, a program of the National Council of Churches USA, said, "I think evangelists do this out of the best intentions, but there is a responsibility to try to understand other faith groups and their culture [...] There's a power imbalance when people are in dire need".

The Bush administration has made it easier for U.S. faith-based groups and missionary societies to tie aid and church together. Farah Stockman, Michael Kranish, Peter S. Canellos and Kevin Baron noted on The Boston Globe:

For decades, US policy has sought to avoid intermingling government programs and religious proselytizing. The aim is both to abide by the Constitution's prohibition against a state religion and to ensure that aid recipients don't forgo assistance because they don't share the religion of the provider. ... But many of those restrictions were removed by Bush in a little-noticed series of executive orders – a policy change that cleared the way for religious groups to obtain hundreds of millions of dollars in additional government funding. It also helped change the message American aid workers bring to many corners of the world, from emphasizing religious neutrality to touting the healing powers of the Christian God.

=== Hygiene ===
Christian missionaries in Africa, China, Guatemala, India, Indonesia, and Korea influenced the development of health care through hygiene, while introducing and distributing soap.

Among Nagaland Christians, "cleanliness and hygiene became an important marker of being identified as a Christian".

=== Other ===
Political scientist Robert Woodberry claims that conversionary Protestants were a crucial catalyst in spreading religious liberty, education, and democracy. However, Elena Nikolova and Jakub Polansky replicate Woodberry's analysis using twenty-six alternative democracy measures and extend the time period over which the democracy measures are averaged. These two simple modifications lead to the breakdown of Woodberry's results. Overall, no significant relationship between Protestant missions and the development of democracy can be established.

== Challenges ==
"'There are attacks practically every week, maybe not resulting in death, but still, violent attacks,' Richard Howell, general secretary of the Evangelical Fellowship of India tells The Christian Science Monitor today. 'They [India's controlling BJP party] have created an atmosphere where minorities do feel insecure.'" According to Prakash Louis, director of the secular Indian Social Institute in New Delhi, "We are seeing a broad attempt to stifle religious minorities and their constitutional rights ... Today, they say you have no right to convert, Tomorrow you have no right to worship in certain places." Existing congregations, often during times of worship, are being persecuted. Properties are sometimes destroyed and burnt to the ground, while native pastors are sometimes beaten and left for dead.

== See also ==
- Adventist Mission
- Catholic Church and the Age of Discovery
- Catholic missions
- Christianization
- Colonialism
- Cultural imperialism
- Emmanuel Community
- Fidesco International
- Indian Reductions
- Jesuit Reductions
- List of Protestant missionary societies
- List of Christian missionaries
- List of Spanish missions
- Missions in California
- Mission (LDS Church)
- Missional living
- Missionary (LDS Church)
- Outstation (church)
- Proselytism
- Religious conversion
- Secondary conversion
- Short-term mission
- Timeline of Christian missions
- Youth with a Mission
