= Organized religion =

Religion with formalized beliefs and rituals

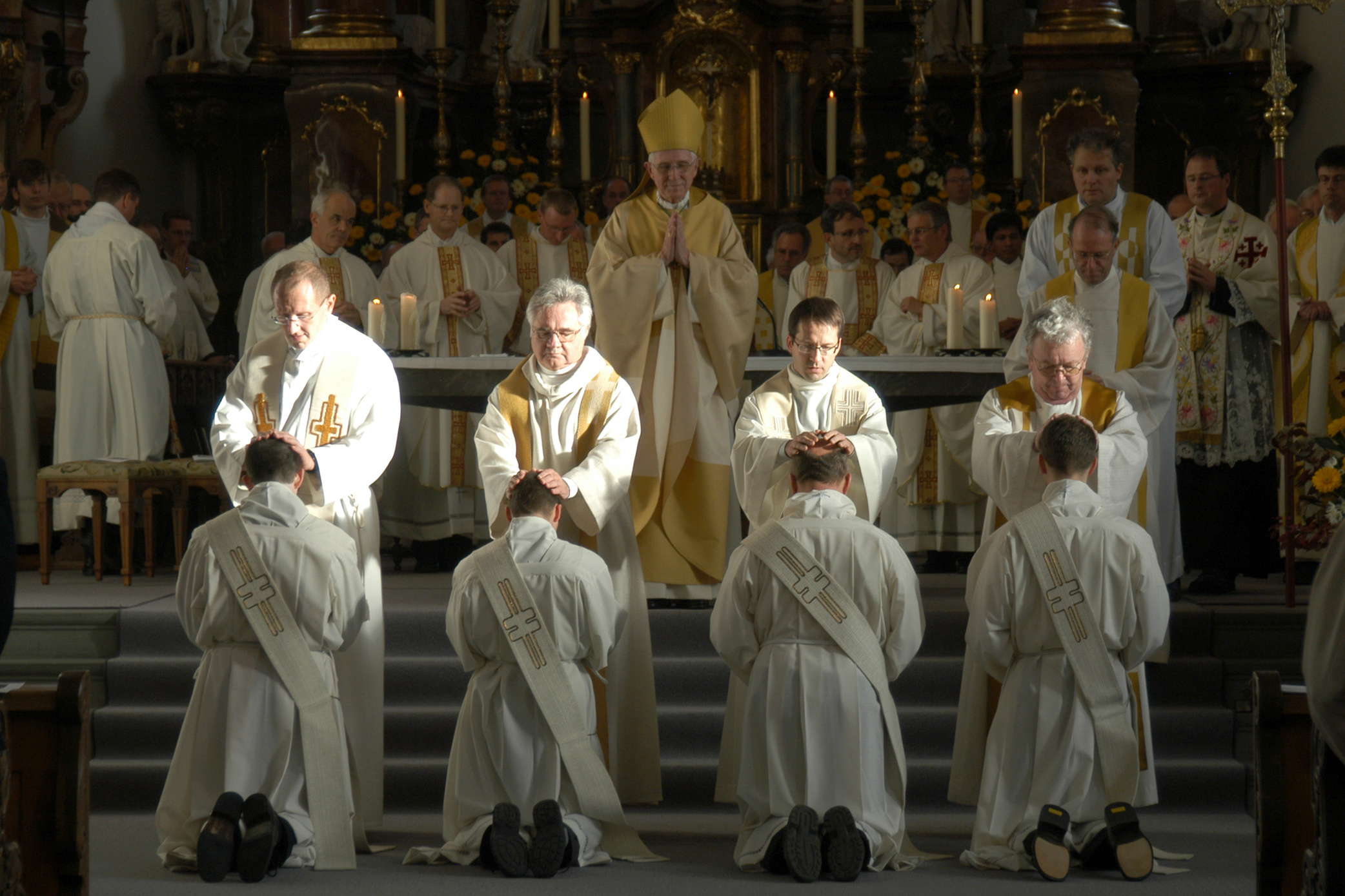
Priests lay their hands on the ordinands during a Roman Catholic rite of ordination. The Catholic Church, the largest Christian denomination, is an example of an organized religion.

Organized religion, also known as institutional religion, is religion in which belief systems and rituals are systematically arranged and formally established, typically by an official doctrine (or dogma), a hierarchical or bureaucratic leadership structure, and a codification of proper and improper behavior.

== Definition ==
Organized religion is distinguished from the broader idea of religion especially in anthropology, sociology and philosophy. American philosopher William James considered organized religion to be distinct from and secondary to religion in and of itself, stating that "out of religion in the sense in which we take it, theologies, philosophies, and ecclesiastical organizations may secondarily grow". James further comments that the essential elements of "institutional religion" are "worship and sacrifice, procedures for working on the dispositions of the deity [i.e.] theology, and ceremony and ecclesiastical organization".

Organized religion is widely assumed by anthropologists to have gained prevalence since the Neolithic era with the rise of wide-scale civilization and agriculture, presumably as a way to alleviate new tensions that emerged as certain societies became settled and then expanded in size. Organized religions may include a state's official religion, or state church. However, most political states have any number of organized religions practiced within their jurisdiction. Due to their structured, standardized, and easily proliferated form, organized religions comprise many of the world's major religious groups.

Still, anthropologists, theologians, scholars, and ordinary usage often conflate religion with organized religion specifically. Examples of this are found in the definition provided by anthropologist Clifford Geertz, who defines religion as a "cultural system." Furthermore, sociologist Max Weber's prominent definition of a religion includes the idea of a 'Church', not necessarily in the Christian formulation, but insisting on the notion of an organized hierarchy constituting a palpable religious body.

== Examples and non-examples ==
The Abrahamic religions are all largely considered organized (including Christianity, Islam, Judaism, and the Baháʼí Faith).

Religions that are not organized religions, or only loosely so, include several Eastern religions such as Confucianism, Shinto, and some types of Buddhism including Secular Buddhism. Also generally excluded are indigenous and folk religions, such as animism, Korean shamanism, African traditions like the San religion, Native American religions, and Old Norse religion, as well as certain new religious movements like modern paganism and Rastafari.

Hinduism is not an organized religion in certain senses, particularly in its lack of a central power structure. However, this definition is disputable, since decentralization is not usually the only factor considered in defining organized religions. Hinduism is also complicated by the fact that many scholars consider it an umbrella collection of diverse spiritual traditions rather than a single unified religion.
