= Kevin Baron =

Kevin Baron may refer to:

- Kevin Baron (footballer) (1926–1971), English professional footballer
- Kevin Baron (journalist) (born 1975), American journalist

== See also ==
- Kevin Barron (born 1946), British Labour Party politician
