= Religious behaviour =

Actions motivated by religious beliefs

Religious behaviours are behaviours motivated by religious beliefs. Religious actions are also called 'ritual' and religious avoidances are called taboos or ritual prohibitions.

Religious beliefs can inform ordinary aspects of life including eating, clothing and marriage, as well as deliberately religious acts such as worship, prayer, sacrifices etc. As there are over 4,000 religions in the world, there is a wide variety of behaviour.

== Actions ==
Religious behaviours may take on several aspects;

- they may be public, such as participating in religious rituals, making pilgrimages, or donating time and money to religious groups;
- they may be group-orientated, such as meeting regularly to carry out traditional rituals in a temple or church.
- they may also be individual and private, such as prayer, meditation, and reading sacred texts.
- they may be professional, with a few people set aside to focus their lives on only carrying out actions in connection with their faith (eg, rabbi, guru, etc)

The most general religious action is prayer. It can be done quietly by a person all alone, but people can also pray in groups using songs. Sacrifice is also a widely spread religious action (usually time, money or food). Prayer and sacrifice, as well as reading scriptures and attending a meeting at a religious building, often form the basis of other, more complicated religious actions like pilgrimage, processions, or consulting an oracle. Many rituals are connected to a certain purpose, like initiation, ritual purification and preparation for an important happening or task. Among these are also the so-called rituals of transition, which occur at important moments of the human life cycle, like birth, adulthood/marriage, sickness and death. A special religious action is spirit possession and religious ecstasy. Religious specialists, such as priests, vicars, rabbis, imams and pandits are involved in many religious actions.

== Avoidances ==
A religious avoidance is when a person desists from something or from some action for religious reasons. It can be food or drink that one does not touch because of one's religion for some time (fast). This abstinence can also be for a longer time. Some people do not have sex (celibacy); others avoid contact with blood, or dead animals. Well known examples are: Jews and Muslims do not eat pork; the celibacy of Catholic priests; the purity rules of Hinduism and Judaism; the Word of Wisdom (which teaches to avoid alcohol, coffee, tea, etc.) of the Church of Jesus Christ of Latter-day Saints.

These avoidances, or 'taboos', are often about;

- food and drink
- speech; some words are forbidden (cursing)
- dying, death and mourning

Religious avoidances are often not easily recognisable as (part of) religious behaviour. When asked, the believers often do not motivate this kind of behaviour explicitly as religious but say the avoidance for health reasons, ethical reasons, or because it is hygienic.

== Academic study ==
Religious behaviour is seldom studied for itself. When it is given attention at all, it is usually studied as an illustration of the religious images, like in comparative religion and cultural anthropology, or as part of the study of man in the social sciences.

Studies can look at both beliefs and actions; for example, studies in the UK looked at people’s attitude to God and the afterlife, as well as actions such as worship attendance and prayer. Other surveys may look at similar actions.

Religious behaviour is part of a larger area of human behaviour; as such, studies and opinions are always changing.

== Controversies ==
=== Persecution ===
Opposition to religious behaviour can lead to Religious Persecution, where certain individuals and groups are seen as 'separate' and unwelcome due to their beliefs or actions.

== Behaviour in sacred spaces ==
In Christianity, there are a number of etiquette rules which would include showing up about five or 10 minutes early to allow some time of prayer and "to be ready to participate in the Mass." Other suggestions may include when to stand, sit or kneel, the use of candles or touching of icons.

Jean-Baptiste Massillon gives a lengthy sermon on the Bible verse, "And Jesus went into the temple of God, and cast out all them that sold and bought in the temple, and overthrew the tables of the money-changers, and the seats of them that sold doves." (Matthew 21:12) stating that "of all crimes, in effect, by which the greatness of God is insulted, I see almost none more deserving of his chastisements than the profanations of his temples; and they are so much the more criminal, as the dispositions required of us by religion, when assisting there, ought to be more holy."

In Hinduism, behavior in hindu temples includes removal of shoes, bowing and bringing an offering. In Islam, etiquette rules when entering a mosque may vary, but they often include wearing clean clothes and carrying out ablutions. In Sikhism, behavior in gurdwaras also involves wearing clean clothes and the usage head coverings. Finally, in Judaism, there are many rules for worship in the synagogue, including seating arrangements and wearing head coverings.

== See also ==
- Discipline
- Elitism
- New religious movement
- Piety
- Revivalism
- Secondary conversion
