= Reverse mission =

Christian mission from majority world to Western nations

Reverse mission is a Christian missiological concept focusing on the late-20th-century reversal of early missionizing efforts, whereby Christians from Africa, Asia, and Latin America send missionaries to Europe and North America.

== History ==
The modern missionary movement has tended to focus on the late-18th-century William Carey, as the "father of modern missions", until the early 20th century finding its peak in Edinburgh 1910. The focus of mission was largely a movement from Europe and North America to Africa, Asia, and Latin America.

The second half of the 20th century has seen the shift of world Christianity, from Europe and North America to Africa, Asia, and Latin America. However, African, Asian, and Latin American Christians have migrated to the West, bringing with them their Christianity. This has been termed "reverse mission," as it emphasizes the reversal of the direction of earlier missionary efforts. Reverse missionaries from African countries have sought to reintroduce Christianity to the United Kingdom, as have Koreans bringing Christianity to the United States.

In 1989, the Third World Missions Association was established in Portland, Oregon, as a forum to train sending agencies of reverse missionaries from Africa, Asia, and Latin American.

== Criticisms ==
Some have criticized the terminology as a rhetoric more than reality, given that the success in mission is less in converting Europeans and North Americans, but in leading immigrant church populations in these lands. Others have noted that the language arose alongside the decolonization of Africa, Asia, and Latin America, and has been used to emphasize the shift of power from the West to the Majority world.

An alternative paradigm has been suggested in terms of return mission, whereby diasporic Christians in Europe and North America return to evangelize the lands of their ancestral origins, especially in Africa and Asia.
