= David Igler =

American historian (born 1964)

- Born: August 31, 1964 (age 61)
- Education: Palo Alto High School; Wesleyan University (B.A. and M.A., American Studies); University of California, Berkeley (PhD, History)
- Occupation: Historian
- Employer: University of California, Irvine

David Bruce Igler (born August 31, 1964) is an American West historian, past president of the Pacific Coast Branch of the American Historical Association, and professor of history at the University of California, Irvine. He is most recently the author of All Species of Knowledge: Discovery, Failure, and Natural History in the Pacific, published by Oxford University Press in 2026. His previous 2013 book, The Great Ocean: Pacific Worlds from Captain Cook to the Gold Rush, published by Oxford University Press in April 2013 is a study of the emergence and transformation of “Pacific worlds” during the late 18th and early 19th centuries. It explores how the environment, commerce, and culture linked what would become American Far West to the eastern Pacific Basin and also to other parts of the Americas. The book shows that the American far west was an integral part of the developing Pacific world long before it became a nexus of national expansion. And it examines the different fates of Asian and indigenous people in contrast to Europeans and Americans. It was featured on the cover of the Times Literary Supplement, in a review titled "From Guano to Guantanamo."

Igler's previous books include Industrial Cowboys: Miller & Lux and the Transformation of the Far West, 1850-1920 and A Companion to California History, co-edited with William Deverell.

In 2009 Igler was awarded the Frederick Burkhardt Residential Fellowship of the American Council of Learned Societies.

At UC Irvine he teaches courses on the American West, environmental history, Pacific history, and US colonial history.
