= Kevin Baron (journalist) =

American journalist (born 1975)

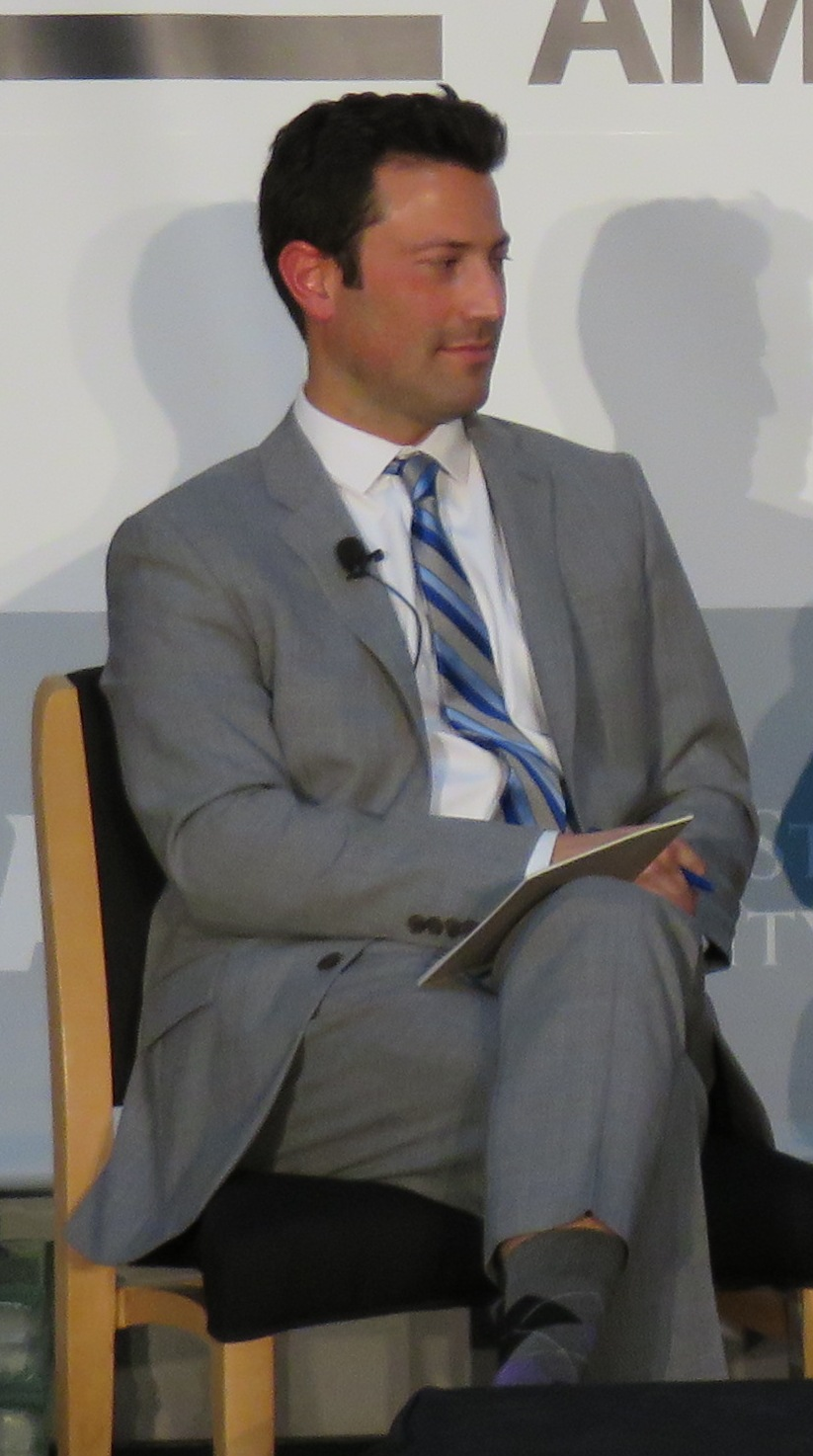
- Education: University of Richmond (BA); George Washington University (MA)
- Occupations: Journalist, executive editor
- Employer: Defense One

Kevin Baron (born 1975) is an American journalist, and the founding executive editor of Defense One, a subdivision of Atlantic Media, and regular contributor to MS NOW.

== Education ==
Baron graduated from the University of Richmond in 1997, with a B.A. in international studies, and from the George Washington University with an M.A. in media and public affairs in 2004.

== Career ==
Previously, he was national security staff writer for National Journal and a reporter for Stars and Stripes, the Boston Globe Washington bureau, and the Center for Public Integrity. He is a regular contributor of opinion pieces to MS NOW, formerly known as MSNBC.

== Awards ==
- 2010 Military Reporters & Editors Award
- 2009 George Polk Award, Military Reporting
- 2003 George Polk Award, Internet Reporting, (Center for Public Integrity)
- 2008 ICIJ Daniel Pearl Award for Outstanding International Investigative Reporting, Finalist
- 2008 Scripps-Howard Foundation National Journalism Award, Washington Reporting, Finalist
- 2007 Associated Press Managing Editors (APME) Award, International Perspective, Finalist
- 2006 Monthly Journalism Award, Washington Monthly, December 2006

== Works ==
- "Files prove Pentagon is profiling reporters", Stars and Stripes, Charlie Reed, Kevin Baron, Leo Shane III, August 27, 2009
