= Secondary conversion =

Religious conversion due to relationship with another convert

In the sociology of religion, secondary conversion is the religious conversion of an individual that results from a relationship with another convert, rather than from any particular aspect of the new religion. For example, someone might join a religious group primarily because their spouse or partner has done so; such a person would be a secondary convert.

Secondary conversion can greatly expand a movement's influence, particularly after a conquest, such as the Muslim Moorish conquest of Spain and Catholic Spain's conquests in Latin America.

== See also ==
- Deathbed conversion, done just before death
- Forced conversion, done under duress
- Marital conversion, religious conversion upon marriage outside of religion
