= Paul the Apostle and women =

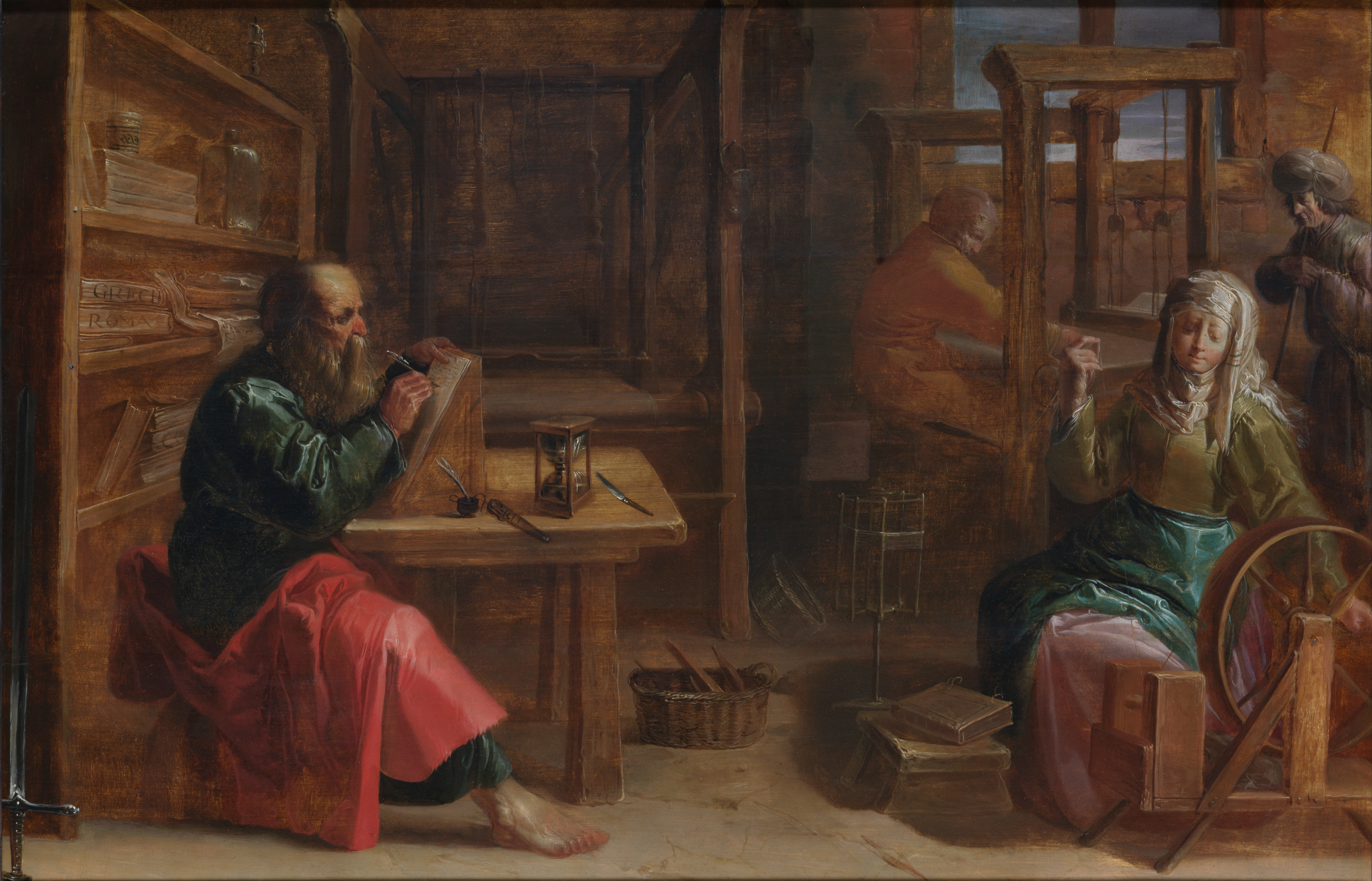
Saint Paul in the House of Priscilla and Aquila (17th century): Paul is at left, writing a letter; Priscilla is at right, spinning, and her husband Aquila is in the background; both were tentmakers.

The relationship between Paul the Apostle and women is an important element in the theological debate about Christianity and women because Paul was the first writer to give ecclesiastical directives about the role of women in the Church. However, there are arguments that some of these writings are post-Pauline interpolations.

== Female disciples ==
The Gospels record that women were among Jesus' earliest followers. Jewish women disciples, including Mary Magdalene, Joanna, and Susanna, had accompanied Jesus during his ministry and supported him out of their private means. Although the details of these gospel stories may be questioned, in general they reflect the prominent historical roles women played as disciples in Jesus' ministry. There were women disciples at the foot of the cross. Women were reported to be the first witnesses to the resurrection, chief among them was Mary Magdalene. She was not only "witness", but also called a "messenger" of the risen Christ.

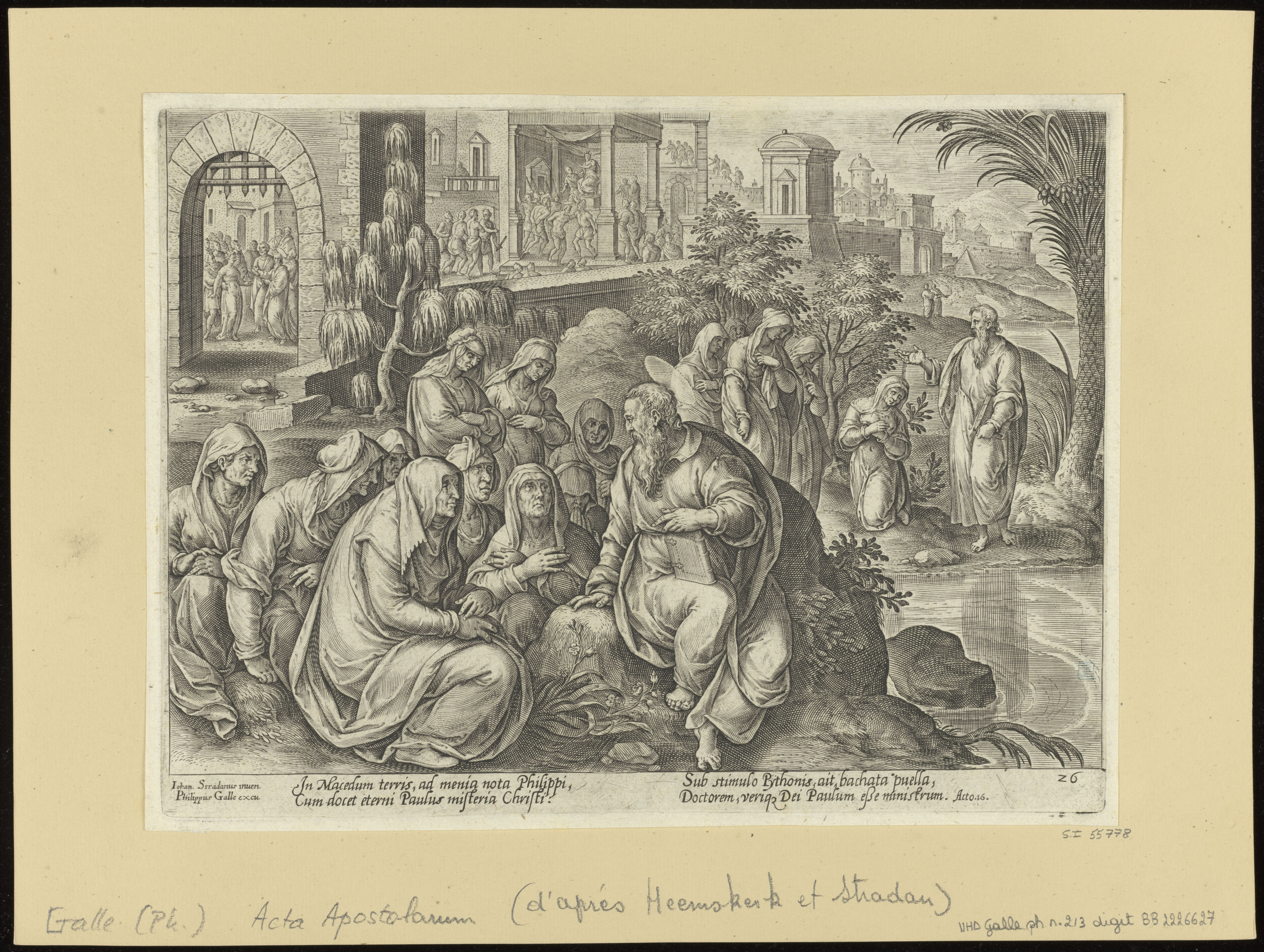
St Paul Speaking to The Women of Philippi (Stradanus, 1582)

From the beginning of the Early Christian church, women were important members of the movement. As time went on, groups of Christians organized within the homes of believers. Those who could offer their home for meetings were considered important within the movement and assumed leadership roles. Such a woman was Lydia of Thyatira, a wealthy dealer in purple cloth. After hearing Paul preach, she and her household were baptized.

The earliest Christian movement, most notably Paul’s movement, was very attractive for wealthy women and widows. They often opened their houses for worship by particular religious movements. According to Elisabeth Schüssler Fiorenza, in the 1st century a woman's place was in the home and the otherwise private areas of life. Turning the private domestic setting into the public religious setting opened up opportunities for religious leadership. Pauline Christianity did not honor its rich patron; instead, it worked within a "motif of reciprocity" by offering leadership roles, dignity and status in return for patronage. Through building up their own house church, women could experience relative authority, social status and political power and renewed dignity within Paul's movement. This concept is reflected in Paul's relationship with Phoebe, Chloe, and Rufus's mother.

== Epistolary evidence ==
By the time Paul began his missionary movement, women were important agents within the different cities. Letters generally accepted as Paul’s are Romans, 1 and 2 Corinthians, Galatians, Philippians, 1 Thessalonians and Philemon. His casual greetings to acquaintances offer solid information about many Jewish and Gentile women who were prominent in the movement. His letters provide vivid clues about the kinds of activities in which women engaged more generally.

In the Letter to the Romans, Paul sends greetings to a number of people and specifically mentions:

- Priscilla and her husband Aquila. She and her husband are mentioned six times in the Bible, as missionary partners with the Apostle Paul. They were also partners in the craft of tentmaking. The author of Acts states that they were refugees who came first to Corinth when the Emperor Claudius expelled all Jews from Rome. Paul mentions that at some point they had risked their lives for him. When Paul refers to Priscilla and Aquila, Priscilla is listed first two out of three times. Some scholars have suggested that she was the head of the family unit.
- Mary and "the beloved Persis" are commended for their hard work.
- He greets Julia, and Nereus's sister, who worked and traveled as missionaries in pairs with their husbands or brothers. He also sends greetings to Tryphena and Tryphosa, who "labour for the Lord's work", and to Rufus' mother. Barbara Leonhard notes that "the fact that Paul singles them out indicates his respect for their ministry."
- He commends to their hospitality, Phoebe, a leader from the church at Cenchreae, a port city near Corinth. Paul attaches to her three titles: diakonos meaning a deacon (lit. "servant"), sister, and prostatis meaning "a woman in a supportive role, patron, benefactor". There is no difference when the title of deacon is used for Phoebe and Timothy. Diakonos (Gk.) is grammatically a masculine word, the same word that Paul uses in regards to his own ministry. Phoebe is the only woman to be named "deacon". Phoebe was especially influential in the early Church, seen in Jerusalem from the 4th century inscription: "Here lies the slave and bride of Christ, Sophia, deacon, the second Phoebe, who fell asleep in Christ." Women flourished in the diaconate between the 2nd and 6th centuries. The position assigned pastoral cares to women, instructed female candidates and anointed them at baptism. They were also required to be present whenever a female would address a bishop. In Romans, Phoebe is seen as acting as Paul's envoy. Phoebe is named as a Patron of Paul, meaning that she would have been a financial contributor to Paul's mission.
- Junia is also mentioned. According to Bart Ehrman, Paul praises Junia as a prominent apostle who had been imprisoned for her labour. Junia is "the only female apostle named in the New Testament". Ian Elmer states that Junia and Andronicus are the only "apostles" associated with Rome that were greeted by Paul in his letter to the Romans. Steven Finlan says Paul greets this couple as "kinspersons and fellow prisoners" and says that "they are outstanding amongst the apostles". According to Ian Elmer, the fact that Andronicus and Junia are named as apostles suggests a priori that they were evangelists and church-planters like Paul. Some translators have rendered the name as the masculine "Junias", but Chrysostom seems clear: "Indeed, how great the wisdom of this woman must have been that she was even deemed worthy of the title apostle.". Scholars dispute whether the grammar indicates that Junia was an apostle herself, or simply well known to the apostles (not being one herself).
- Chloe was a prominent woman of Corinth. It was from "Chloe's people" that Paul, then at Ephesus learned of the divisions in the congregation of Corinth.
- In Philippians he expresses appreciation for Euodia and Syntyche his fellow-workers in the gospel.

According to Karen King, these biblical reports seem to provide credible evidence of women apostles being active in the earliest work of spreading the Christian gospel.

In Galatians 3:28, Paul wrote "nor is there male and female," hearkening back to Genesis 1, for all are one in Christ.

== Deaconesses ==
According to Thurston, there can be no doubt that in their first institution the deaconesses were intended to discharge those same charitable offices, connected with the temporal well being of their poorer fellow Christians, which were performed for the men by the deacons. But in one particular, the instruction and baptism of catechumens, their duties involved service of a more spiritual kind. The universal prevalence of baptism by immersion and the anointing of the whole body that preceded it rendered it a matter of propriety that in this ceremony the functions of the deacons should be discharged by women.

== Ecclesiastical directives ==
=== Silence in church ===
The letters of Paul, dated to the middle of the first century AD, were written to specific communities in response to particular questions or problems. Paul was in Ephesus around the year 56 when he received disquieting news regarding the church at Corinth. Factionalism had developed. At the fellowship meal some got drunk while others were left hungry. There seemed to be a preference for ecstatic prayer at the expense of works of charity, with a number of members all "speaking in tongues" at the same time. It was apparently reported to him that women were appearing at the assembly without the head covering customary in contemporary Greek society, and may have been arguing over their right to address the assembly. The fledgling community appeared to be in disorder.

1 Corinthians 14:33–35 (NIV) states:

"As in all the congregations of the Lord’s people. Women should remain silent in the churches, They are not allowed to speak, but must be in submission, as the law says. If they want to inquire about something, they should ask their own husbands at home; for it is disgraceful for a woman to speak in the church."

Barbara Leonhard and others find this contradicts a statement in 1 Corinthians 11:5 that seems to presuppose that women are, in fact, praying and prophesying in the assembly of believers (but prefers they do it with the appropriate head covering). Leonhard notes that it is inconsistent with Paul's dealings with his co-workers in that women such as Prisca, Phoebe and Junia could not have functioned as Church leaders and apostles if they were not allowed to speak in public. She and other scholars believe this to be a "post-Pauline interpolation".

According to Jerome Murphy-O'Connor, in The New Jerome Biblical Commentary:

1 Corinthians 14:34–35 are not a Corinthian slogan, as some have argued…, but a post-Pauline interpolation. ... Not only is the appeal to the law (possibly Genesis 3:16) un-Pauline, but the verses contradict 1 Corinthians 11:5. The injunctions reflect the misogyny of 1 Timothy 2:11–14 and probably stem from the same circle. Some mss. place these verses after 40.

— Jerome Murphy-O'Connor

According to this thesis, verses 14:33 and 14:36 were meant to be a single statement, as follows:

For you can all prophesy in turn so that everyone may be instructed and encouraged. The spirits of prophets are subject to the control of prophets (for God is not a God of disorder but of peace), as in all the congregations of the Lord's people...or did the word of God originate with you? Or are you the only people it has reached?

The interpolator would then have added the reference to women having to be silent in the church between "Lord's people" and "or". Theologian and New Testament scholar David Bentley Hart argues that "the insertion seems obviously to interrupt a single thought: Paul exhorts the Corinthians to heed the examples of all the churches (verses 31-33) and then (verse 36) emphasizes his point with the rhetorical question of whether, instead, they think the gospel their exclusive priority" and that "the argument reads coherently only when these discordant verses (34 and 35) are removed".

However, David Odell-Scott disagrees with the interpolation hypothesis, and instead supports the notion that verses 34-35 are a Corinthian slogan that Paul is critiquing and correcting. Odell-Scott notes that the injunction for silence and subordination in verses 34-35 is immediately followed by an incredulous reply in the form of a negative rhetorical query in verse 36 (RSV):

"What! Did the word of God originate with you, or are you the only ones it has reached?"

The greek word "ἢ" can be translated both as "or" and as "what!", with Odell-Scott preferring the latter interpretation. By this interpretation, verse 36 is a Pauline refutation of a Corinthian opponent quoted and critiqued by the evangelist. Joseph Fitzmyer agrees with this interpretation.

Odell-Scott further argues that those western manuscripts that moved 34-35 to a different position (after verse 40) are the work of a patriarchal redactor seeking to "shelter" and protect the Corinthian slogan from Paul's emphatic critique in verse 36. By associating these verses with the "decency and order" of verse 40, the redactor undermined the egalitarian interpretation of the canonical version, and incorrectly presented the Corinthian voice as the voice of Paul. Thus the ancient editor effectively harmonized the text with the parallel passage of 1 Timothy. However, this variant version of 1 Corinthians was not canonized. Nonetheless, many English translations of verse 36 omit the key "heta" particle (which can be translated as "What?!" but also, as is commonly done, as "or"). Translations may thus serve to diminish the contradictory tone of the interrogative verse 36, and preserve the sense of harmony with 1 Timothy.

=== First Epistle to Timothy ===
The First Epistle to Timothy is presented as a letter from Paul in Macedonia to Timothy in Ephesus. It is termed one of the "pastoral epistles" in that it is not directed to a particular congregation but to a pastor in charge of caring for a community of believers.

1 Timothy 2: 9-15 (NASB) says:

Likewise, I want women to adorn themselves with proper clothing, modestly and discreetly, not with braided hair and gold or pearls or costly garments, but rather by means of good works, as is proper for women making a claim to godliness. A woman must quietly receive instruction with entire submissiveness. But I do not allow a woman to teach or exercise authority over a man, but to remain quiet. For it was Adam who was first created, and then Eve. And it was not Adam who was deceived, but the woman being deceived, fell into transgression. But women will be preserved through the bearing of children if they continue in faith and love and sanctity with self-restraint.

Since the nineteenth century, the attribution to Paul of the "pastoral letters" has come into question. There are a wide variety of opinions as what extent, if any, Paul either wrote or influenced their composition. If Paul wrote them, the date of composition is likely 63–67; if not their date may be as late as the early second century. While acknowledging a degree of patriarchalism in Paul, according to Bernard Robinson, former Lecturer in Sacred Scripture at Ushaw College, Durham, most scholars think that Paul is not the author; and that 1 Timothy probably comes from the end of first century, at a time when the church had become somewhat more institutional and patriarchal than it was in Paul’s day.

=== Epistle to Titus ===
In Titus 2:3-5, Paul teaches that, as older men must be "temperate, dignified, self-controlled, sound in faith, love, and endurance," so older women must behave reverently, refrain from slander and alcoholism, and teach "what is good" to younger women. He also says that younger women must love their families and be "self-controlled, chaste, good homemakers, under the control of their husbands." Like younger women, younger men must also be self-controlled, Paul says.

=== Headship ===
A New Testament passage that has long been interpreted to require a male priority in marriage are these verses: "Wives, submit to your husbands as to the Lord", and "the husband is the head of the wife as Christ is the head of the church". Both Christian Egalitarians and Complementarians agree that the Apostle Paul wrote that the "husband is head" and "wives, submit", and that he was divinely inspired to write what he wrote, but the two groups diverge in their interpretation of this passage.

But I want you to realize that the head of every man is Christ, and the head of the woman is man, and the head of Christ is God. Every man who prays or prophesies with his head covered dishonors his head. But every woman who prays or prophesies with her head uncovered dishonors her head—it is the same as having her head shaved. For if a woman does not cover her head, she might as well have her hair cut off; but if it is a disgrace for a woman to have her hair cut off or her head shaved, then she should cover her head. A man ought not to cover his head, since he is the image and glory of God; but woman is the glory of man. For man did not come from woman, but woman from man; neither was man created for woman, but woman for man.

Christian Egalitarians believe that full partnership in an equal marriage is the most biblical view. As persons, husband and wife are of equal value. There is no priority of one spouse over the other. In truth, they are one. Bible scholar Frank Stagg and Classicist Evelyn Stagg write that husband-wife equality produces the most intimate, wholesome and mutually fulfilling marriages. They conclude that the Apostle Paul's statement recorded in Galatians 3:28, sometimes called the "Magna Carta of Humanity", applies to all Christian relationships, including Christian marriage: "There is neither Jew nor Greek, there is neither bond nor free, there is neither male nor female: for you are all one in Christ Jesus."

Christian Egalitarian theologians also find it significant that the "two becoming one" concept, first cited in Gen. 2:24, was quoted by Jesus in his teachings on marriage. In those passages he reemphasized the concept by adding to the Genesis passage these words: "So, they are no longer two, but one" (NIV). The Apostle Paul cited the Genesis 2:24 passage.

Much has been written concerning the meaning of "head" in the New Testament. The word used for "head", transliterated from Greek, is kephalē—which means the anatomical head of a body. Today's English word "cephalic" (sə-făl'ĭk) means "Of or relating to the head; or located on, in, or near the head." In the New Testament, a thorough concordance search shows that the second most frequent use of "head" (kephalē), after "the structure that connects to our neck and sits atop our bodies", is the metaphorical sense of "source".

The Complementarian (also known as Traditionalist or Hierarchical) view of marriage maintains that male leadership is biblically required in marriage. Complementarians generally believe that the husband and wife are of equal worth before God, since both are created in God's image, but that husbands and wives have different functions and responsibilities in marriage. According to this view, the husband has the God-given responsibility to provide for, protect, and lead his family. Wives are expected to respect their husbands' authority and submit to it. However, some Complementarian authors caution that a wife's submission should never cause her to "follow her husband into sin".

=== Submission to one's husband ===
Wives, submit yourselves to your own husbands as you do to the Lord. For the husband is the head of the wife as Christ is the head of the church, his body, of which he is the Savior. Now as the church submits to Christ, so also wives should submit to their husbands in everything. Husbands, love your wives, just as Christ loved the church and gave himself up for her to make her holy, cleansing her by the washing with water through the word, and to present her to himself as a radiant church, without stain or wrinkle or any other blemish, but holy and blameless. In this same way, husbands ought to love their wives as their own bodies. He who loves his wife loves himself. After all, people have never hated their own bodies, but they feed and care for them, just as Christ does the church—for we are members of his body.

Scholar David deSilva notes that in Ephesians 5, Paul modifies the Aristotelian household code by adding a preface that each person should submit to one another (Verse 21).

Wives, submit yourselves to your husbands, as is fitting in the Lord. Husbands, love your wives and do not be harsh with them.

== Christian Egalitarian views ==
In Galatians 3:28, Paul maintains that "There is no longer Jew or Greek, there is no longer slave or free, there is no longer male and female; for all of you are one in Christ Jesus." Given the number of greetings to women in Romans 16 and the commissioning of Phoebe.

In the first century when Paul was writing passages that now appear in the New Testament, people in Roman society were judged by two sets of criteria:

- The first consisted of education, skill, power, intelligence and wealth.
- These factors could be outweighed by the social categories such as origin, birth, language, legal rank, social desirability, occupation, age and gender.

When these categories collided, it created status inconsistency/dissonance when one's achieved status was greater than the status attributed to the person by culture and by law.

=== Second-century deference to society ===
Elaine Pagels maintains that the majority of the Christian churches in the second century went with the majority of the middle class in opposing the trend toward equality for women. By the year 200, the majority of Christian communities endorsed as canonical the "pseudo-Pauline" letter to Timothy. That letter, according to Pagels, stresses and exaggerates the antifeminist element in Paul's views: "Let a woman learn in silence in all submissiveness. I permit no woman to teach or have authority over men; she is to keep silent." She believes the letters to the Colossians and to the Ephesians, which order women to "be subject in everything to their husbands", do not express what she says were Paul's very favorable attitudes toward women, but also were "pseudo-Pauline" forgeries.

Beth Allison Barr believes that Paul's beliefs on women were progressive for the time period. Barr notes that medieval theologians rarely quoted him to support their patriarchal views and that Pope John Paul II believed that using these passages to support the inferiority of women would be akin to justifying slavery, due to the historical context of the household codes. Wives, like slaves, were considered to be under male authority in Roman law. Barr believes that Paul's intended message was to counter these ideals: he addresses women first and places Jesus as the ultimate authority that everyone was meant to submit to. She also notes that Paul did not believe that women were "deformed men" like his Roman contemporaries and used maternal language most frequently, often using such metaphors to describe himself as a woman. Barr believes that Roman authorities thought that early Christians were "gender deviants" precisely because they did not enforce the household codes as intended. She also believes that Paul was quoting Cicero when saying that women should be silent, before going on to counter this reasoning, and that this is more obvious when the verses are read aloud.

== See also ==
- 1 Timothy 2:12 ("I suffer not a woman")
