= Priscilla and Aquila =

1st century Christian missionary married couple

Saints Aquila and Priscilla of Rome
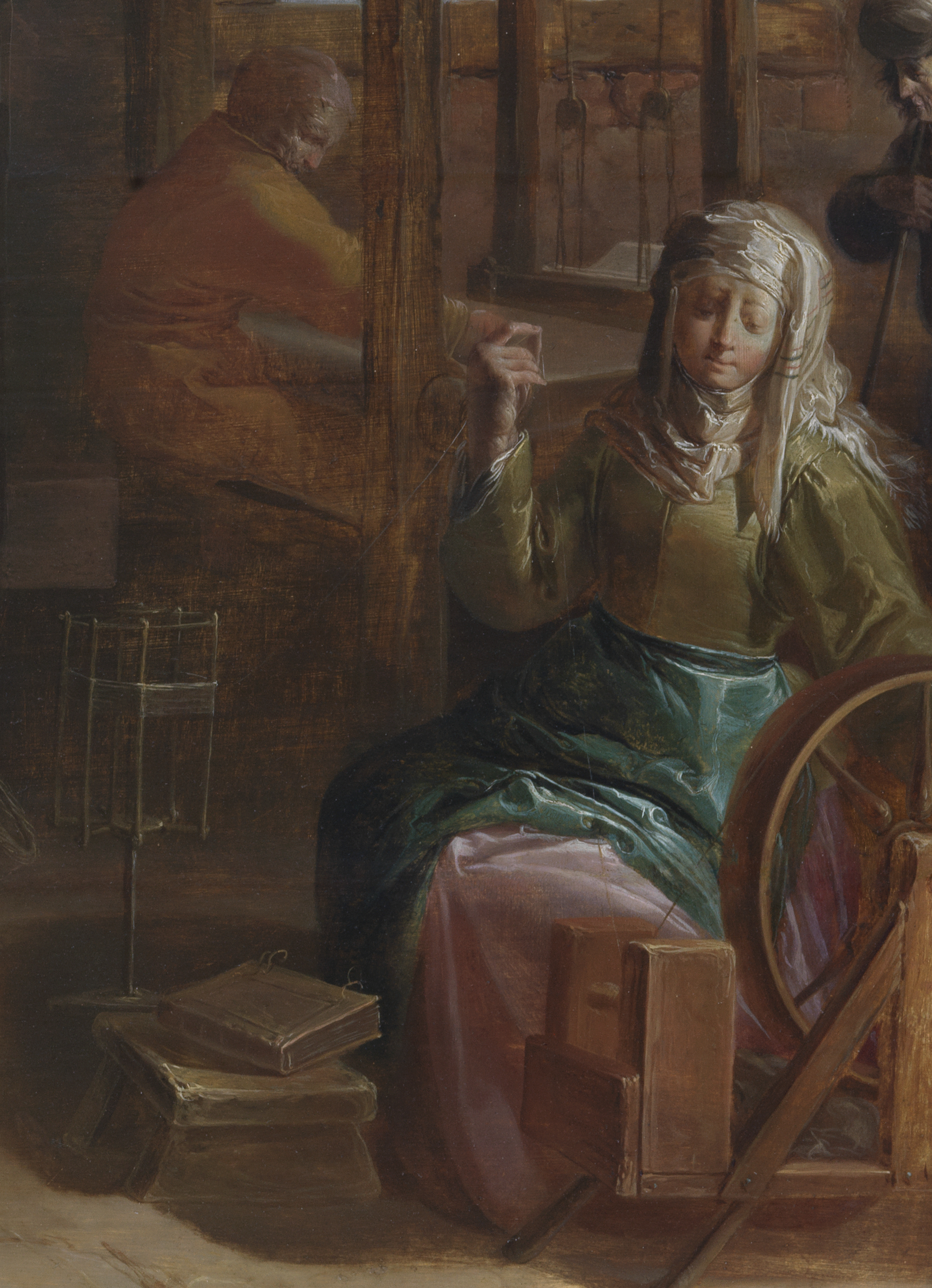
- Detail from Paul in the house of Saints Aquila and Priscilla by Jan van der Venne, 1616-1651.

Holy Couple and Martyrs
- Born: Unknown
- Died: Rome
- Venerated in: Catholic Church; Anglican Communion; Eastern Orthodoxy; Oriental Orthodoxy; Lutheran Church
- Canonized: Pre-Congregation
- Feast: 8 July (Catholic Church, Anglican Communion); 13 February (Eastern Orthodoxy); 14 July (other Orthodox Churches commemorate Saint Aquila alone as an Apostle)
- Attributes: Crown of Martyrdom; Martyr's palm Cross
- Patronage: Love; Marriage

Priscilla (Note: /prɪˈsɪlə/; Greek: Πρίσκιλλα, romanized: Priskilla) and Aquila (Note: /ˈækwɪlə/; Greek: Ἀκύλας, romanized: Akylas) were a first-century Christian missionary married couple described in the New Testament. Aquila is traditionally listed among the Seventy Disciples. They lived, worked, and traveled with the Apostle Paul, who described them as his "fellow workers in Christ Jesus" (Romans 16:3).

Priscilla and Aquila are described in the New Testament as providing a presence that strengthened the early Christian churches. Paul was generous in his recognition and acknowledgment of his indebtedness to them (Romans 16:3–4). Together, they are credited with instructing Apollos, a major evangelist of the first century, and "[explaining] to him the way of God more accurately" (Acts 18:26). They were forced from their home during the persecution under Claudius.

It is thought by some to be possible, in light of her apparent prominence, that Priscilla held the office of presbyter. She also is thought by some to be the anonymous author of the Epistle to the Hebrews.

== New Testament references ==
They are mentioned six times in four different books and by two different human penman (Paul and Luke) in the New Testament. They are always named as a couple and never individually. Of those six references, Aquila's name is mentioned first only twice: and one of the times on account of it being Paul's first encounter with them, probably through Aquila first.

1. Acts 18:2–3: "There he became acquainted with a Jew named Aquila, born in Pontus, who had recently arrived from Italy with his wife, Priscilla. They had left Italy when Claudius Caesar deported all Jews from Rome. Paul lived and worked with them, for they were tentmakers just as he was."
2. Acts 18:18: "Paul stayed in Corinth for some time after that, then said good-bye to the brothers and sisters and went to nearby Cenchrea. There he shaved his head according to Jewish custom, marking the end of a vow. Then he set sail for Syria, taking Priscilla and Aquila with him."
3. Acts 18:26: "When Priscilla and Aquila heard him preaching in the synagogue, they took him aside and explained the way of God even more accurately."
4. Romans 16:3: "Give my greetings to Priscilla and Aquila, my co-workers in the ministry of Christ Jesus."
5. 1 Corinthians 16:19: "The churches here in the province of Asia send greetings in the Lord, as do Aquila and Priscilla and all the others who gather in their home for church meetings."
6. 2 Timothy 4:19: "Give my greetings to Priscilla and Aquila and those living in the household of Onesiphorus."

Note: This is not KJV; in the KJV, Acts 18:26 lists their names as "Aquila and Priscilla" making the count three and three.

== The couple ==
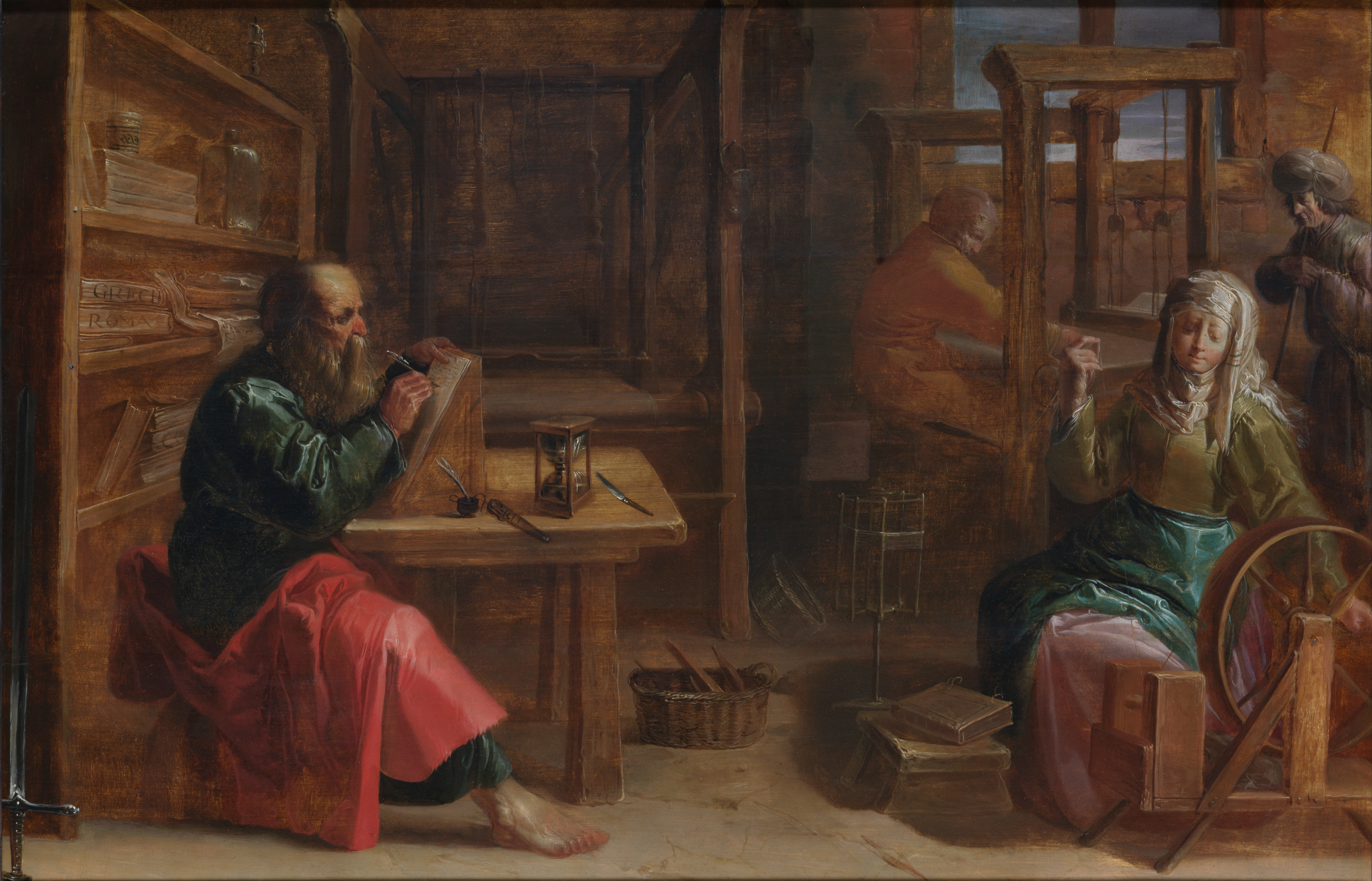
Paul staying in the house of Saints Aquila and Priscilla by Jan van de Venne, 17th century: Paul is at left, writing a letter; Priscilla is at right, spinning, and her husband Aquila is in the background, working on the loom.

Priscilla and Aquila were tentmakers as was Paul. Priscilla and Aquila had been among the Jews expelled from Rome by the Roman Emperor Claudius in the year 49 as written by Suetonius. They ended up in Corinth. Paul lived with Priscilla and Aquila for approximately 18 months. Then the couple started out to accompany Paul when he proceeded to Syria, but stopped at Ephesus in the Roman province of Asia, now part of modern Turkey.

In 1 Corinthians 16:19, Paul passes on the greetings of Priscilla and Aquila to their friends in Corinth, indicating that the couple were in his company. Paul founded the church in Corinth. His including them in his greetings implies that Priscilla and Aquila were also involved in the founding of that church. Since 1 Corinthians discusses a crisis deriving from a conflict between the followers of Apollos and the followers of Cephas (possibly the apostle Peter), it can be inferred that Apollos accompanied Priscilla and Aquila when they returned to Corinth. This happened before 54, when Claudius died and the expulsion of the Jews from Rome was lifted.

In Romans 16:3–4, thought to have been written in 56 or 57, Paul sends his greetings to Priscilla and Aquila and proclaims that both of them "risked their necks" to save Paul's life.

Tradition reports that Aquila and Priscilla were martyred together.

=== Priscilla ===
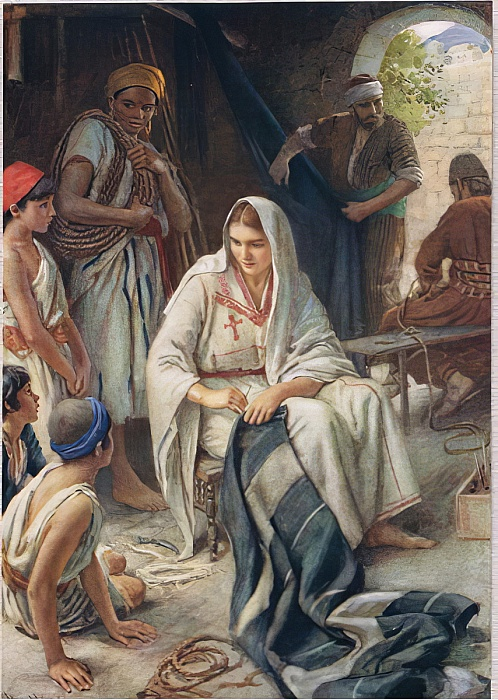
Priscilla illustration from the Women of the Bible, Harold Copping

Priscilla was a woman of Jewish heritage and one of the earliest known Christian converts who lived in Rome. Her name is a Roman diminutive for Prisca which was her formal name. She is often thought to have been the first example of a female preacher or teacher in early church history. Coupled with her husband, she was a celebrated missionary, and a friend and co-worker of Paul.

While the view is not widely held among scholars, some scholars have suggested that Priscilla was the author of the Book of Hebrews. Although acclaimed for its artistry, originality, and literary excellence, it is one of the few books in the New Testament with author anonymity. Hoppin and others suggest that Priscilla was the author, but that her name was omitted either to suppress its female authorship, or to protect the letter itself from suppression.

She is the only Priscilla named in the New Testament. The fact that she is always mentioned with her husband, Aquila, disambiguates her from different women revered as saints in Catholicism, Orthodoxy and Lutheranism, such as (1) Priscilla of the Roman Glabrio family, the wife of Quintus Cornelius Pudens, who according to some traditions hosted St. Peter circa AD 42, and (2) a third-century virgin martyr named Priscilla and also called Prisca.

=== Aquila ===
Aquila, husband of Priscilla, was originally from Pontus Acts 18:2 and also was a Jewish Christian. According to church tradition, Aquila did not dwell long in Rome: the Apostle Paul is said to have made him a bishop in Asia Minor. The Apostolic Constitutions identify Aquila, along with Nicetas, as the first bishops of Asia Minor (7.46).

== Significance ==
This couple were among the earliest known Christian missionaries in the first century. In Acts 18:24–28, Luke reports the couple explaining Jesus' baptism to Apollos, an important Jewish-Christian evangelist in Ephesus. Paul indicates Apollos is an apostle, an "eloquent speaker" who had a "thorough knowledge of the Scriptures". He had been "instructed in the way of the Lord" which he taught with great "enthusiasm". He began to preach boldly in the synagogue. However, he knew only the baptism of John the Baptist—not the baptism taught by Jesus. When Priscilla and Aquila heard him, they took him aside and explained the Way of God to him "more accurately".

Amongst churches today, this passage is often held in perceived tension with 1 Timothy 2:12–14, which the reads, "I do not permit a woman to teach or have authority over a man; rather, she is to remain quiet. For Adam was formed first, then Eve; and Adam was not deceived but the woman was deceived and became a transgressor." Opponents of female pastorship cite his reference to Adam and Eve to be indicating that the issue is a matter of universal gender propriety.

Advocates of female pastorship perceive this as an imperative that was a reflection of cultural and legal restrictions of the day. They cite 1 Corinthians 11:11–12, where Paul writes "Nevertheless, in the Lord woman is not independent of man nor man of woman; for as woman was made from man, so man is now born of woman. And all things are from God" and his affirmation of Priscilla's instruction of the prominent evangelist Apollos as evidence that Paul was acceding to the law and customs of his day.

=== Chronology ===
The appearance of the two in the Acts of the Apostles helps to provide a chronological synchronism for the chronology of Paul's life. According to Acts 18:2f, before Paul meets them in Corinth, they were part of a group of Jews whom the Emperor Claudius expelled from Rome; if this edict of the Emperor can be dated, then we would be able to infer when Paul arrived in Corinth.

The evidence of other ancient sources points to two possible periods during the reign of Claudius: either during his first regnal year (AD 41; so Dio Cassius, Roman History 60.6.6), or during his ninth regnal year (AD49; so Orosius, Historia 7.6.15f). As a result, the experts are divided over when this expulsion took place: some, like Jerome Murphy-O'Connor, argue for the earlier year, while others, like Joseph Fitzmyer, argue for the later year.

== Veneration ==
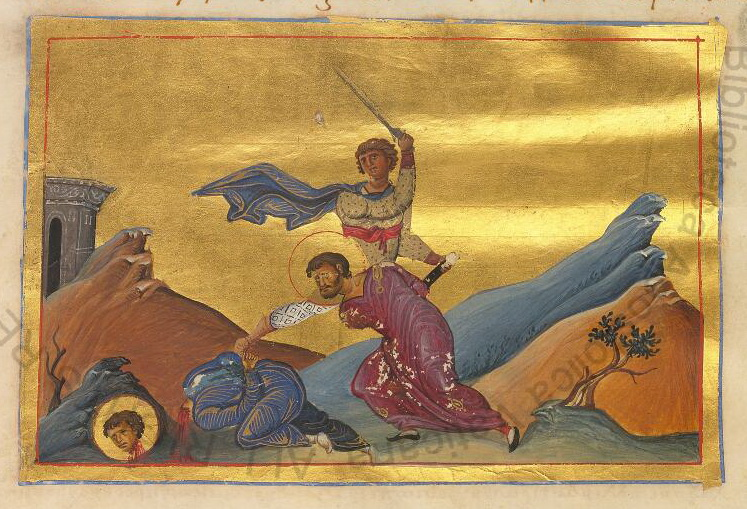
Miniature in the Menologion of Basil II

Priscilla and Aquila are regarded as saints in most Christian churches that canonize saints. In the Catholic Church, the Roman Martyrology lists their feast as July 8. Most churches in The Anglican Communion follow suit. The Greek Orthodox Church and the Antiochian Orthodox Church commemorate them together on February 13. The Greek Orthodox Church recognizes Aquila separately as an apostle on July 14.

== See also ==
- Paul the Apostle and women
- Aquila of Sinope
- Titus Flavius Clemens
