= Aída Besançon Spencer =

Dominican-American Presbyterian minister

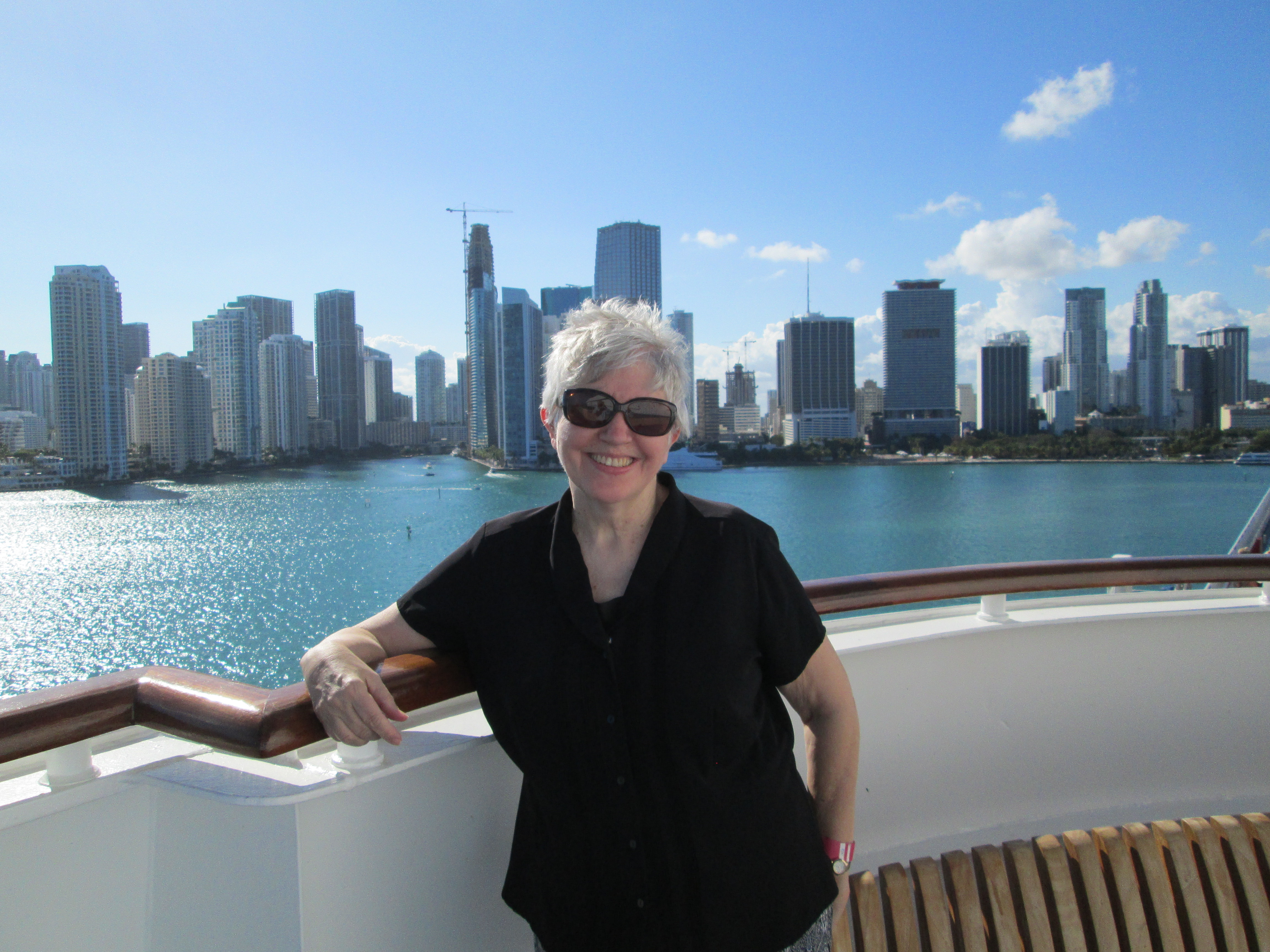
- Spencer in 2022
- Born: 1947 (age 78–79); Santo Domingo, Dominican Republic
- Occupations: Professor of New Testament and Presbyterian minister
- Spouse: William David Spencer
- Parent(s): Frederick H. and Aída Guzman Besançon

Academic work
- Discipline: Theology
- Institutions: Gordon-Conwell Theological Seminary

Aída Besançon Spencer (born 1947) is a Dominican-American New Testament professor and Presbyterian minister.

== Career ==
Spencer is Professor of New Testament at Gordon-Conwell Theological Seminary in South Hamilton, Massachusetts. She has written on The Apostle Paul, Paul's Literary Style, Women in Christianity and the New Testament from a Hispanic perspective.

On the hermeneutical issues of 1 Timothy 2:12, she and Wheaton New Testament scholar Gilbert Bilezikian have argued that the author's prohibition on women speaking in the congregation was only intended to be a temporary response to women who were teaching error.

== Personal life ==
Spencer was born in Santo Domingo, Dominican Republic, to Frederick H. (a comptroller) and Aída (a business entrepreneur and homemaker; maiden name, Guzman) Besançon. She is married to William David Spencer, who is a writer, minister, and educator. They cowrite the blog Applying Biblical Truths Today since 2012. They began (2009) and edit the Africanus Journal and the House of Prisca and Aquila series. Their son, Stephen William Spencer, is the director of programming at Salem public access cable station.

== Publications ==
=== Books ===
- Spencer, William; Spencer, Aida (May 1998). The Global God: Multicultural Evangelical Views of God. ISBN 0801021634.
- Spencer, William; Spencer, Aida (14 September 2018). Cave of Little Faces: A Novel. ISBN 9781532650826.
- Reaching for the New Jerusalem: A Biblical and Theological Framework for the City. Wipf and Stock. 2 August 2013. ISBN 978-1621898191.
- The Goddess Revival: A Biblical Response to God(dess) Spirituality. Wipf & Stock. September 2010. ISBN 9781608999217.
- Spencer, Aida; Spencer, William, eds. (30 October 2020). Christian Egalitarian Leadership: Empowering the Whole Church according to the Scriptures – Aída Besançon Spencer and William David Spencer Imprint: Wipf and Stock. ISBN 9781725270534.
- Spencer, Aida (31 October 2013). 1 Timothy, New Covenant Commentary Series. Cascade. ISBN 9781556359910.
- Spencer, Aida (16 May 2014). 2 Timothy and Titus. ISBN 9781625642530.
- Spencer, Aida (1984). Paul's Literary Style: A Stylistic and Historical Comparison of 2 Corinthians 11:16-12:13, Romans 8:9-39, and Philippians 3:2-4:13. ISBN 9780761839545.
- Spencer, Aida (2020). A Commentary on James, Kregel Exegetical Library. ISBN 9780825444616.
- Spencer, Aida (1985). Beyond the Curse: Women Called to Ministry. ISBN 9780801047749.
- Spencer, Aida (2001). 2 Corinthians. The People's Bible Commentary. ISBN 9781841010731.
- Spencer, Aida (2025). The Exegetical Process. How to Write a New Testament Exegesis Paper Step by Step. ISBN 9780825449161.

=== Articles ===
- Spencer, Aida. "What the Bible Actually Teaches on Women". Priscilla Papers: The Academic Journal of CBE International. 33 (3).
- Spencer, Aida (August 1, 2017). "El Ministerio de las Mujeres". Priscilla Papers.
