= Willow Creek Community Church =

Coordinates: 42.0915°N 88.1343°W

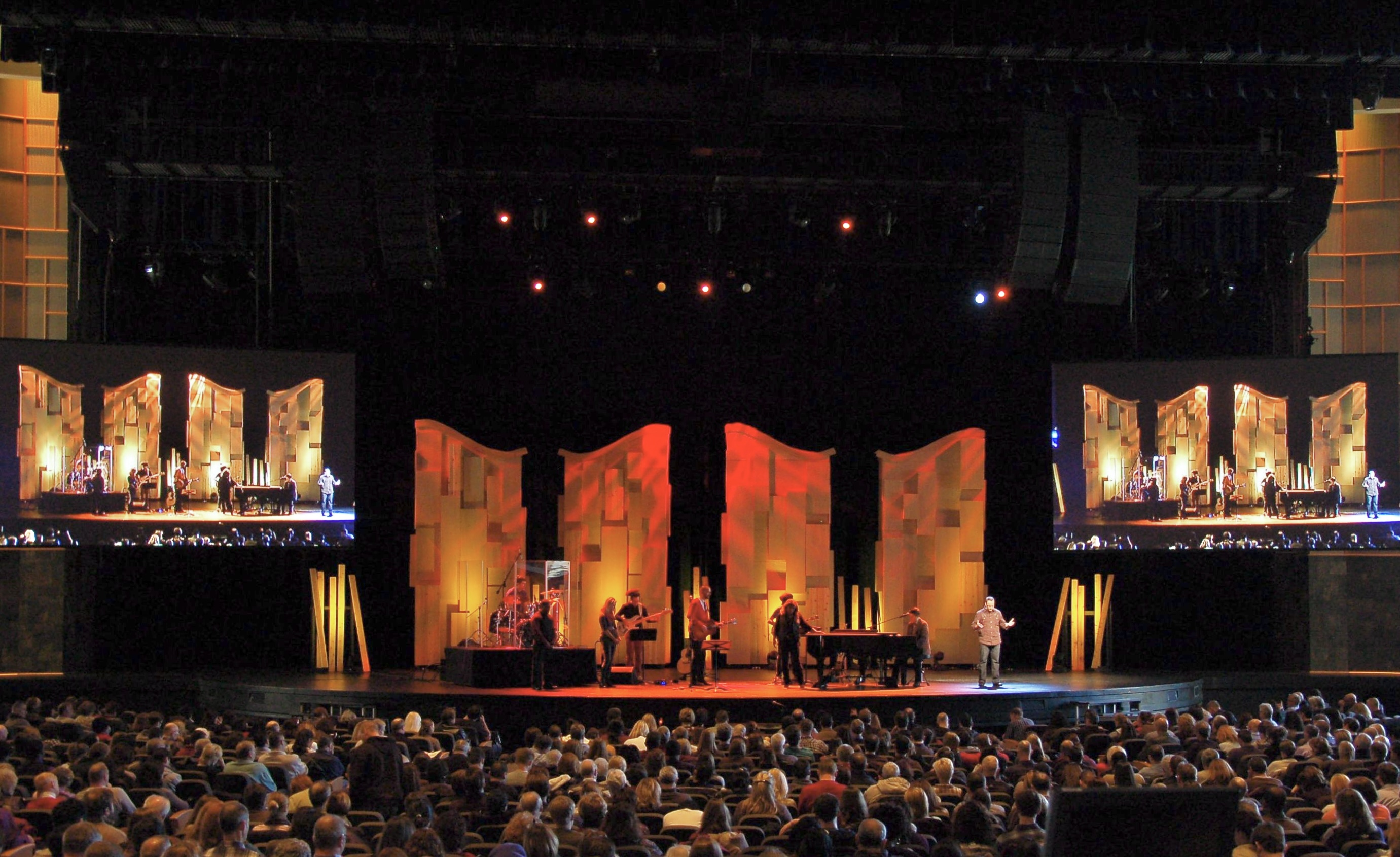
- Worship in 2012
- Willow Creek Community Church
- Location: 67 Algonquin Road, South Barrington, Illinois
- Country: United States
- Denomination: Evangelical non-denominational
- Website: willowcreek.org

History
- Founded: 1975
- Founder: Bill Hybels

Clergy
- Pastor: Shawn Williams

Willow Creek Community Church is an evangelical nondenominational Christian multisite megachurch based in the northwestern Chicago suburb of South Barrington, Illinois. It was founded on October 12, 1975 by Dave Holmbo and Bill Hybels, who was its longtime senior pastor. Willow Creek has seven locations in the Chicago area; their Spanish-speaking congregations, Willow Español, meet at South Barrington and South Lake in Lincolnshire campuses.

In 2018, the church's entire senior leadership and elder board resigned, admitting to having mishandled abuse allegations against Hybels. Steve Gillen, the longtime pastor of the church's North Shore campus, was named interim senior pastor in August 2018. In January 2020, it was announced that Gillen would step down in March and that the two candidates who were being considered for the role of senior pastor had been "released" from the search process. Dave Dummitt became senior pastor in June 2020. In 2026, Pastor Dummitt stepped down in a planned transition. Shawn Williams, the campus pastor of Willow Creek’s South Barrington, Illinois site, was named as the new senior pastor.

== History ==
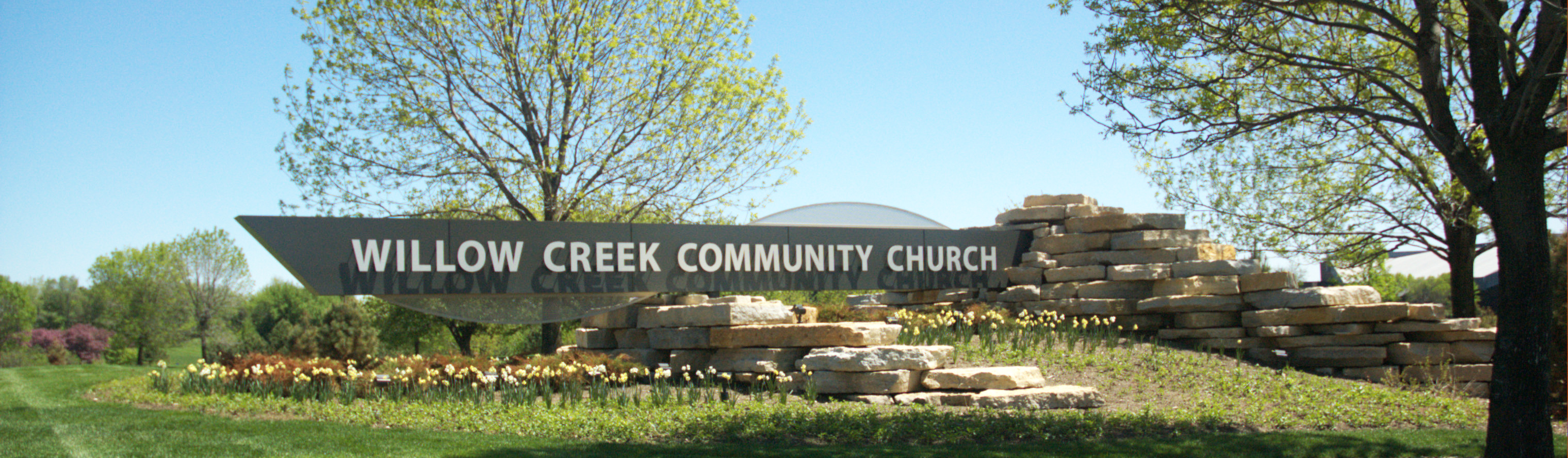
Entrance

Willow Creek Community Church started when Bill Hybels and Dave Holmbo were inspired by the success of the South Park Church of Park Ridge, Illinois' youth ministry, Son City, of which they were both leaders (Holmbo had invited Hybels to work with him a few years earlier), and aspired to start an evangelical church that used music and drama. On October 12, 1975, the church met for the first time, renting Willow Creek Theater in Palatine, Illinois. Gilbert Bilezikian was Hybels' theological mentor. Bilezikian has been "credited with Willow Creek’s inclusion of women in its highest levels of leadership".

In 1977, Willow Creek purchased 90 acres (360,000 m^{2}) in South Barrington, Illinois to build its own building. The first service was held in the new building in February 1981. Since then, the building has been doubled in size and the property expanded to 155 acres (0.63 km^{2}).

In September 1978, Hybels learned that Holmbo "had been involved in a pattern of behavior that threatened the stability of the staff member's personal life and the integrity of the rest of the staff". He shared this with the elders, who decided to keep it secret from the rest of the church, and allowed Holmbo to stay in ministry provided he sought professional counseling and submitted to accountability and monitoring from the church's elders. In September 1979, the elders confronted Holmbo with his "ongoing pattern of behavior and his apparently unrepentant spirit". Holmbo then resigned from his position. This resignation was presented to the church as due to "differing philosophies of ministry". This led to disruption among the congregation, and over the next six months, multiple board members and nearly half the staff left. Insiders came to call this time "The Train Wreck".

In 2004, the church inaugurated a new 7,200-seat auditorium on its South Barrington campus. In 2015, the church's weekly attendance was 25,000 people.

On April 10, 2018, following allegations of sexual misconduct, Hybels announced his immediate early retirement as senior pastor of the church; he had previously planned to retire in October of that year. Hybels, who denied the allegations, received a standing ovation from the church upon making this announcement. In August 2018, Steve Gillen—the longtime pastor of the church's North Shore campus—was chosen as interim senior pastor.

In November 2018, CBS News listed Willow Creek Community Church as the fifth largest megachurch in the United States with about 25,743 weekly visitors.

In January 2020, it was announced that Gillen would step down in March and that the two candidates who were being considered for the role of senior pastor had been "released" from the search process. In April 2020, the Elder Board of Willow Creek named Dave Dummitt as the new Senior Pastor. In 2026, Pastor Dummitt stepped down in a planned transition. Shawn Williams, the campus pastor of Willow Creek’s South Barrington, Illinois, was named as the new senior pastor.

As of February 2020, the church averaged 18,000 attendees each weekend at seven locations. In 2024, in person attendance was reported to be 9,800 and remote viewing was 3,700.

According to the ECFA, the church's income was nearly $60 million in 2018, $53.2 million in 2019, and $42 million in 2020.

== Misconduct allegations and resignations ==
On March 23, 2018, the Chicago Tribune published an article detailing allegations of sexual misconduct by former Senior Pastor Bill Hybels spanning decades, including a prolonged affair with a married woman, though this was retracted by the woman herself. The Tribune wrote that elders of Willow Creek had conducted an internal review of Hybels' behavior which led to no findings of misconduct, leading to the resignations of at least three leaders of the Willow Creek Association’s board over what they believed to be an insufficient inquiry. All accusations have been denied by Hybels.

Hybels had planned to retire in October 2018 to focus his energy on the Willow Creek Association. On April 10, 2018, Hybels announced that he was moving forward his retirement date effective immediately and stated that he did not want to be a distraction to the church's ministry. He also announced he would leave the board of the Willow Creek Association and would no longer lead Willow Creek’s Global Leadership Summit.

On April 21, 2018, the Chicago Tribune and Christianity Today reported more misconduct allegations not included in the initial investigation. Church elders received reports of other unwanted sexual comments and advances by Hybels that not been previously investigated by the elder board. The elders indicated they would seek wise counsel and work with experts to investigate the allegations, developing a collaborative process.

On August 5, 2018, The New York Times reported extensively documented allegations of sexual misconduct against a tenth reported victim that were not included in any previous investigations or reports. Co-lead pastor Steve Carter resigned the same day. The entire elder board and co-lead pastor Heather Larson resigned on August 8, 2018 following a joint apology for mishandling the investigation.

On August 13, 2018, the Chicago Tribune reported the church had paid $3.25 million to settle two lawsuits over child sexual abuse by a church volunteer. Despite the settlements, the church denied any negligence in the two cases.

In September 2018, Willow Creek Community Church and Willow Creek Association announced the formation of what they called an "Independent Advisory Group" to investigate the numerous allegations against their founder. Religion News Service reported in December 2018 that the alleged misconduct and admitted mishandling of the allegations had led to a $3 million budget shortfall for 2018, the elimination of 50 full-time positions, a 9% reduction in attendance across all the church's campuses, and a reduction in attendance of at least 15% at its main South Barrington Campus.

A six-month independent review of the allegations against Hybels, conducted by four evangelical leaders engaged for that purpose and completed in February 2019, found Hybels' accusers credible.

In January 2020, the church announced that co-founder Gilbert Bilezikian had "engaged in inappropriate behavior" after a long time church member alleged he had sexually assaulted her a number of times between 1984 and 1988. Bilezikian denied the accusations and said the church had "violated the Bible's teaching on dealing with accusations against fellow Christians." The Elder Board of Willow Creek stated that it had restricted Bilezikian from serving within the church when allegations were brought against him in 2010; in 2015, however, he was honored as a "living legend" of the church. In January 2020, the Elder Response Team asserted that Bilezikian had been restricted from serving in the church, but added that he had continued to teach and serve in various capacities because "the restriction was not adequately communicated". In May 2020, Bilezikian filed a defamation lawsuit against the church.

== Willow Creek Association ==
In 1992, the Willow Creek Association was founded. Since 1995, Willow Creek Association has held an annual leadership summit. Speakers at the summit have included President Bill Clinton.

== Books about Willow Creek Community Church ==
- Hybels, Bill; Hybels, Lynne (1997). Rediscovering Church: The Story and Vision of Willow Creek Community Church. Grand Rapids: Zondervan. ISBN 0-310-21927-2.
- Hybels, Bill (2002). Courageous Leadership. Grand Rapids: Zondervan. ISBN 0-310-24823-X.
- Schacke, Rainer (2009). Learning from Willow Creek?. Göttingen: Cuvillier. ISBN 978-3-86955-104-3.
- Pritchard, GA (1996). Willow Creek Seeker Services: Evaluating a New Way of Doing Church. Grand Rapids: Baker Books. ISBN 978-0-8010-5274-3. 330 pp.

== See also ==
- Me Too movement
- Catholic Church sexual abuse cases
