= Bill Hybels =

American church figure and author (born 1951)

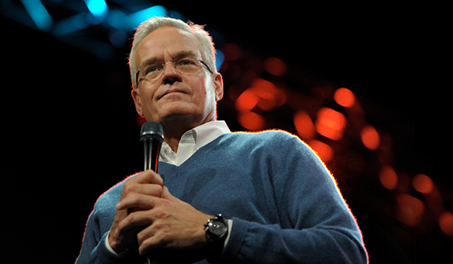
- Born: December 12, 1951 (age 74); Kalamazoo, Michigan, U.S.
- Occupations: Author, Minister
- Spouse: Lynne Hybels (m. 1974)
- Children: Shauna Niequist; Todd Hybels
- Writing career
- Subject: Leadership

William Hybels (born December 12, 1951) is an American church figure and author. He is the founding and former senior pastor of Willow Creek Community Church and the founder of the Willow Creek Association, and he is also the creator of the Global Leadership Summit. Hybels has authored a number of Christian books, especially on the subject of Christian leadership.

Hybels was slated to retire from his position at Willow Creek in October 2018; however, he resigned in April 2018 after allegations of sexual misconduct were made against him. An independent review found the allegations to be credible, although Hybels has denied all allegations.

== Early life and education ==
Hybels was born and raised in Kalamazoo, Michigan. He is Dutch-American and grew up participating in the Christian Reformed Church in North America. Hybels's father was an entrepreneur in wholesale produce whose work ethic was the model for his son. In a 2006 interview with the Chicago Tribune, he pointed to an experience at a Wisconsin summer camp as a teenager that crystallized his understanding and personal embrace of Christian belief. Hybels holds a bachelor's degree in Biblical Studies from Trinity International University, near Chicago.

== Willow Creek Community Church ==
In 1971, Hybels—then serving as youth pastor at South Park Church in Park Ridge, Illinois—started a youth group/band with friend Dave Holmbo called 'Son City'. After 300 youth waited in line for a service in May 1974, Hybels and other leaders began dreaming of forming a new church. They surveyed the community to find out why people weren't coming to church. Common answers were reported to be: "church is boring", "they're always asking for money", or "I don't like being preached down to." These answers shaped the group's approach to the new church.

On October 12, 1975, the group held its first service at Willow Creek Theater in Palatine, Illinois. One hundred and twenty-five people attended the service. The rent and other costs were paid for with 1,200 baskets of tomatoes, sold door-to-door by 100 teenagers. Hybels spoke on "New Beginnings".

Challenges in 1979 led to a recommissioning of the church's vision to be broader and deeper than before. Hybels apologized for the example of his relentless schedule and overemphasis on grace. "We've set up all our leadership structures and goals to grow a full functioning Acts 2 community, as opposed to just an evangelizing machine that doesn't drive the roots down deep and do all the other things it's supposed to do."

In 1981, the church moved to its current location in South Barrington. By 2000, six services were being held each weekend for 15,000 attendees in a 352,000-square-foot (32,700 m^{2}) building. Starting in 1998 Hybels acted as a spiritual advisor to then-President Bill Clinton during the Monica Lewinsky scandal. In 2004, a new Worship Center was opened. With a capacity of more than 7,000, the state-of-the-art auditorium is one of the largest theaters in the United States. In 2017, the church averaged 25,000 attendees per week, making it the eighth largest church in America, according to Outreach 100.

On July 1, 2010, Hybels introduced President Barack Obama for a speech on immigration reform.

Hybels was not heavily involved in the church's day-to-day operations between mid-2006 and 2008. Gene Appel served as lead pastor of the South Barrington Campus from mid-2006 until Easter 2008.

In September 2018, Religion News Service reported attendance was down 9% across all Willow Creek campuses following a scandal involving Hybels and the resignation of the church's entire senior leadership team.

== The Global Leadership Summit ==
Hybels started the Global Leadership Summit (hosted by the Global Leadership Network (GLN) (rebranded from Willow Creek Association in 2018)) in 1995 as an annual training event for leaders to sharpen their skills. The summit telecasts live from the campus of Willow Creek Community Church, with 118,000 people watching via livestream at host sites across the U.S. in 2018, and hundreds of thousands more later watching via video in countries around the world. The Summit lost more than 100 host sites and tens of thousands of viewers in 2018 following the Hybels scandal.

== Misconduct allegations and resignation ==
On March 23, 2018, the Chicago Tribune published an article detailing allegations of sexual misconduct by Hybels spanning decades. The article reported that Hybels had engaged in a prolonged affair with a married woman; however, this allegation was retracted by the woman herself. The Tribune wrote that the elders of Willow Creek had conducted an internal review of Hybels' behavior which led to no findings of misconduct; following this report, at least three leaders of the Willow Creek Association board reportedly resigned their posts because they believed the inquiry to have been insufficient. All accusations have been denied by Hybels.

Hybels had planned to retire in October 2018 to focus his energy on the Willow Creek Association. On April 10, 2018, Hybels announced that he was resigning, effective immediately, stating he did not want to be a distraction to the church's ministry. He also announced that he would leave the board of the Willow Creek Association and would no longer lead Willow Creek's Global Leadership Summit.

On April 21, 2018, the Chicago Tribune and Christianity Today reported further misconduct allegations which were not part of the initial investigation. Despite its initial denial and defense of Hybels, the Willow Creek Board of Elders released a statement on May 9, 2018, as part of its second investigation into allegations against him. The statement indicated that the Board "[does] not believe the stories were all lies or that all the [accusers] were colluding against him."

On August 5, 2018, The New York Times published allegations from a former employee of Hybels who alleged that he repeatedly sexually harassed and assaulted her in the 1980s, including fondling her breasts and obtaining oral sex. The complainant only came forward after hearing of the other allegations against Hybels, but crucially had contemporaneous evidence of her allegations from people in whom she confided at the time. Hybels denied the allegations.

In August 2018, the entire board of elders at Willow Creek resigned, apologizing for being slow to respond to the accusations against Hybels.

In March 2019, The Washington Post reported that a six-month independent review by four evangelical leaders found the misconduct allegations against Hybels to be credible. The reviewers asserted that were Hybels still pastor at Willow Creek, disciplinary action would be required.

== Publications ==
Books which Hybels has authored or made a contribution to include:

- Authenticity: Being Honest with God and Others (and Kevin Harney) (Zondervan, 1996) – ISBN 978-0-310-26588-7
- Axiom: Powerful Leadership Proverbs (Zondervan, 2008) – ISBN 978-0-310-27236-6
- Becoming a Contagious Christian (and Mark Mittelberg) (Zondervan, 1996) – ISBN 978-0-310-21008-5
- Character: Reclaiming Six Endangered Qualities (and Kevin Harney) (Zondervan, 1997) – ISBN 978-0-310-26602-0
- Christians in a Sex-Crazed Culture (Scripture Press Publications, 1989) ISBN 978-0896934955
- Commitment: Developing Deeper Devotion to Christ (and Kevin Harney) (Zondervan, 1996) – ISBN 0-310-26595-9
- Community: Building Relationships Within God's Family (and Kevin Harney) (Zondervan, 1996) – ISBN 0-310-26591-6
- Courageous Faith Through the Year (and Keri Wyatt Kent) (InterVarsity Press, 2004) – ISBN 978-0-8308-3294-1
- Courageous Leadership (Zondervan, 2002) – ISBN 978-0-310-24823-1
- Descending Into Greatness (Zondervan, 1993) – ISBN 978-0-310-54471-5
- Engraved on Your Heart: Living the Ten Commandments Day by Day (Cook Communications, 2000) – ISBN 0-7814-3396-7
- Essential Christianity: Practical Steps for Spiritual Growth (and Kevin Harney) (Zondervan, 2005) – ISBN 978-0-310-26604-4
- Finding God in the Storms of Life (Inter-varsity Press, 2002) – ISBN 978-0-8308-6546-8
- Fit to be Tied: Making Marriage Last a Lifetime (and Lynne Hybels) (Zondervan, 1991) – ISBN 978-0-310-53371-9
- Fruit of the Spirit: Living the Supernatural Life (and Kevin Harney) (Zondervan, 1998) – ISBN 978-0-310-26596-2
- Getting a Grip: Finding Balance in Your Daily Life (and Kevin Harney) (Zondervan, 1998) – ISBN 978-0-310-26605-1
- Holy Discontent: Fueling the Fire That Ignites Personal Vision (Zondervan, 2007) – ISBN 978-0-310-27228-1
- Honest to God? Becoming an Authentic Christian (Zondervan, 1990) – ISBN 978-0-310-52181-5
- How to Hear God (InterVarsity Press, 1999) – ISBN 0-8308-6559-4
- James: Live Wisely (Zondervan, 1999) – ISBN 978-0-310-22767-0
- Jesus: Seeing Him More Clearly (and Kevin Harney) (Zondervan, 2005) – ISBN 978-0-310-26597-9
- Just Walk Across the Room: Simple Steps Pointing People to Faith (Zondervan, 2006) – ISBN 978-0-310-26669-3
- Lessons on Love: Building Deeper Relationships (and Kevin Harney) (Zondervan, 2005) – ISBN 0-310-26593-2
- Living in God's Power: Finding God's Strength for Life's Challenges (and Kevin Harney) (Zondervan, 2005) ISBN 0-310-26606-8
- Love in Action: Experiencing the Joy of Serving (and Kevin Harney) (Zondervan, 2005) – ISBN 978-0-310-26607-5
- Making Life Work: Putting God's Wisdom Into Action (Inter-varsity Press, 1998) – ISBN 978-0-8308-1788-7
- Marriage: Building Real Intimacy (and Kevin Harney) (Zondervan, 2005) – ISBN 0-310-26589-4
- Meeting God: Psalms for the Highs and Lows of Life (and Kevin Harney) (Zondervan, 2005) – ISBN 978-0-310-26599-3
- New Identity: Discovering Who You Are in Christ (and Kevin Harney) (Zondervan, 2005) – ISBN 0-310-26594-0
- Parenting: How to Raise Spiritually Healthy Kids (and Kevin Harney) (Zondervan, 2005) – ISBN 978-0-310-26590-0
- 1 Peter: Stand Strong (Zondervan, 1999) – ISBN 978-0-310-22773-1
- Philippians: Run the Race. (Zondervan, 1999) – ISBN 978-0-310-23314-5
- Prayer: Opening Your Heart to God (and Kevin Harney) (Zondervan, 2005) – ISBN 978-0-310-26600-6
- Reaching Out: Sharing God's Love Naturally (and Kevin Harney) (Zondervan, 2005) – ISBN 0-310-26592-4
- Rediscovering Church: The Story and Vision of Willow Creek Community Church (and Lynne Hybels) (Zondervan, 1997) – ISBN 978-0-310-21927-9
- Revelation: Experience God's Power (Zondervan, 2001) – ISBN 0-310-22882-4
- Romans: Find Freedom (Zondervan, 1999) – ISBN 978-0-310-22765-6
- Sermon on the Mount 1: Connect with God (Zondervan, 2001) – ISBN 0-310-22883-2
- Sermon on the Mount 2: Connect with Others (Zondervan, 2001) – ISBN 0-310-22884-0
- Significance: Understanding God's Purpose for Your Life (and Kevin Harney) (Zondervan, 2005) – ISBN 0-310-26603-3
- Simplify: Ten Practices to Unclutter Your Soul (Tyndale Momentum, 2014) – ISBN 978-1-414-39122-9
- Tender Love: God's Gift of Sexual Intimacy (Moody Publications, 1993) – ISBN 978-0802463494
- The Pastor's Guide to Personal Spiritual Formation (and Reginald Johnson, Neil B. Wiseman) (Beacon Hill Press, 2004) – ISBN 0-8341-2209-X
- The Power of a Whisper: Hearing God, Having the Guts to Respond (Zondervan, 2010) – ISBN 978-0-310-32074-6
- The Real Deal: Discover the Rewards of Authentic Relationships (and Kevin Harney) (Zondervan, 2005) – ISBN 0-310-26601-7
- The Real You (Zondervan, 1996) – ISBN 978-0-310-20682-8
- The Volunteer Revolution (Zondervan, 2004) – ISBN 978-0-310-25238-2
- Too Busy Not to Pray (InterVarsity Press, 1994) – ISBN 978-0-8308-2004-7
- Transformation: Letting God Change You from the Inside Out (and Kevin Harney) (Zondervan, 2005) – ISBN 978-0-310-26598-6
- Transparency (Zondervan, 1997) – ISBN 978-0-310-21715-2
- When Leadership and Discipleship Collide (Zondervan, 2007) ISBN 978-0-310-28306-5
- Who You Are When No One's Looking (InterVarsity Press, 1995) – ISBN 978-0-8308-2003-0

== Literature ==
- Pritchard, Gregory A. (1996). Willow Creek Seeker Services: Evaluating a New Way of Doing Church. Grand Rapids: Baker Books.
- Schacke, Rainer (2009). Learning from Willow Creek?. Göttingen: Cuvillier. ISBN 978-3-86955-104-3.
- Schacke, Rainer (2025). "Sexual Misconduct, Bill Hybels and the Willow Creek Movement: Retrospective Reflections on Leading and Following Between Ideal and Reality in Dialogue with Max Weber". In Kessler, Volker; Marsch, Angelika; Wünch, Hans-Georg (eds.). Leaders between Role Model and Idol. Zurich: LIT. pp. 267–286.
