= Gilbert Bilezikian =

American pastor and academic

- Born: June 26, 1927 (age 99); Paris
- Education: University of Paris; Gordon-Conwell Theological Seminary
- Occupations: Writer, professor, and lecturer
- Children: 5
- Writing career
- Subject: Christianity

Gilbert Bilezikian (born June 26, 1927, in Paris, France) is an American Evangelical Christian writer, professor, and lecturer. Along with Bill Hybels, Bilezikian is a co-founder of Willow Creek Community Church in South Barrington, Illinois. In 2020, Willow Creek announced that allegations of sexual abuse had been made against Bilezikian.

== Early life and education ==
Bilezikian was born in Paris, France, to parents who were Armenian refugees. He was drafted in the French army where he served as a medic in North Africa during the Algerian liberation conflict. He first came to the United States in 1947.

Bilezikian earned his BA from the University of Paris, his M.Div. from Gordon-Conwell Theological Seminary, and his Th.D. from Boston University. He also pursued a seven-year post-doctoral program at the Sorbonne in Paris under Professor Oscar Cullmann.

== Career ==
Beginning in 1961, Bilezikian served for five years as pastor of Loudonville Community Church outside of Albany, N.Y.. He returned to Paris for seven years, during which time he taught at the European Bible Institute and served as Minister of Christian Education at the American Church in Paris.

For 20 years, Bilezikian was a professor at Wheaton College. He interrupted his tenure at Wheaton to assume for three years the presidency of Haigazian University in Beirut, Lebanon, and to teach two years at Trinity College in Deerfield, Illinois. In 1992, he became Professor of Biblical Studies Emeritus at Wheaton College.

Bilezikian co-founded Willow Creek Community Church with Bill Hybels in 1975 and was Hybels' mentor. In 2000, Hybels said, "There would be no Willow Creek without Gilbert Bilezikian." Bilezikian has been "credited with Willow Creek’s inclusion of women in its highest levels of leadership". He also helped to found Christians for Biblical Equality in 1988.

== Sexual abuse allegations ==
In January 2020, Willow Creek Community Church announced that Bilezikian had "engaged in inappropriate behavior" after a longtime church member alleged he had sexually assaulted her a number of times between 1984 and 1988. Bilezikian denied the accusations and contended that the church had "violated the Bible's teaching on dealing with accusations against fellow Christians". Hybels had previously resigned from Willow Creek in April 2018 following allegations of misconduct.

The Elder Board of Willow Creek stated that it had restricted Bilezikian from serving within the church when allegations were brought against him in 2010; in 2015, however, he was honored as a "living legend" of the church. In January 2020, the Elder Response Team asserted that Bilezikian had been restricted from serving in the church, but added that he had continued to teach and serve in various capacities because "the restriction was not adequately communicated". In February 2020, his title as Wheaton College Professor Emeritus of Biblical Studies was revoked by the college. In May 2020, Bilezikian filed a defamation lawsuit against the church. The suit was dismissed by the court in July 2022.

== Publications ==
In addition to numerous articles, Bilezikian is the author of several books, including the following:

- Beyond Sex Roles: What the Bible Says about a Woman's Place in Church and Family (1985 1st Edition & 2nd Editions; 2006 3rd Edition; Baker Academic)
- Christianity 101: Your Guide to Eight Basic Christian Beliefs (1993 Zondervan)
- Community 101 (1993 Zondervan)
- Community 101: Reclaiming the Local Church as Community of Oneness
- Comunidad Elemental: Reivindicando la iglesia locol como una comunidad unida (Spanish ed.)
- From Despair to Hope (2012)
- How I Changed My Mind about Women in Leadership (2010 Zondervan)
- The Liberated Gospel: A Comparison of the Gospel of Mark and Greek Tragedy (1977 Baker; reprinted 2010 Wipf and Stock)
