= Jan van der Venne =

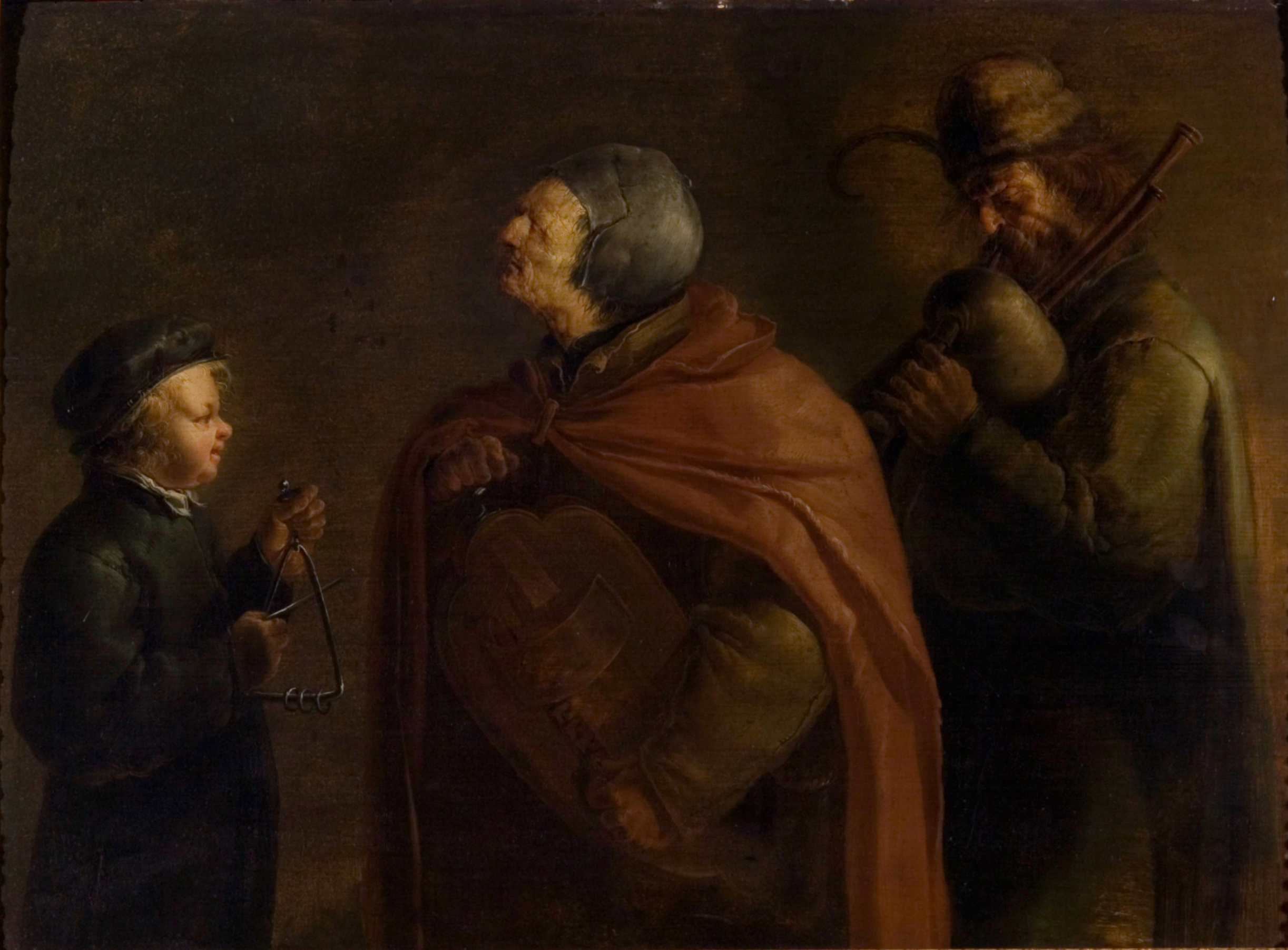
Three Wandering Musicians

Jan van der Venne or Jan van de Venne, formerly known as Pseudo van de Venne or Pseudo-Van der Venne, in older sources sometimes spelled van der Vinnen (active by 1616 – died before 1651) was a Flemish painter of genre subjects, religious scenes and cabinet paintings. Many of his works depict "low-life" genre scenes of tooth-pullers, card-players and hurdy-gurdy players, tronies and expressive religious scenes. He was court painter to the governors of the Spanish Netherlands.

== Rediscovery and identification ==
Works by Jan van der Venne were formerly attributed to an unidentified artist referred to as 'Pseudo van de Venne' or 'Pseudo-Van der Venne'. This Pseudo van de Venne was erroneously believed to be the brother, also called Jan, of the better known Dutch painter Adriaen van de Venne. Adriaen's brother Jan, however, died in Middelburg in 1625 and could therefore not have painted the works attributed to this anonymous artist as they clearly date from a later period.

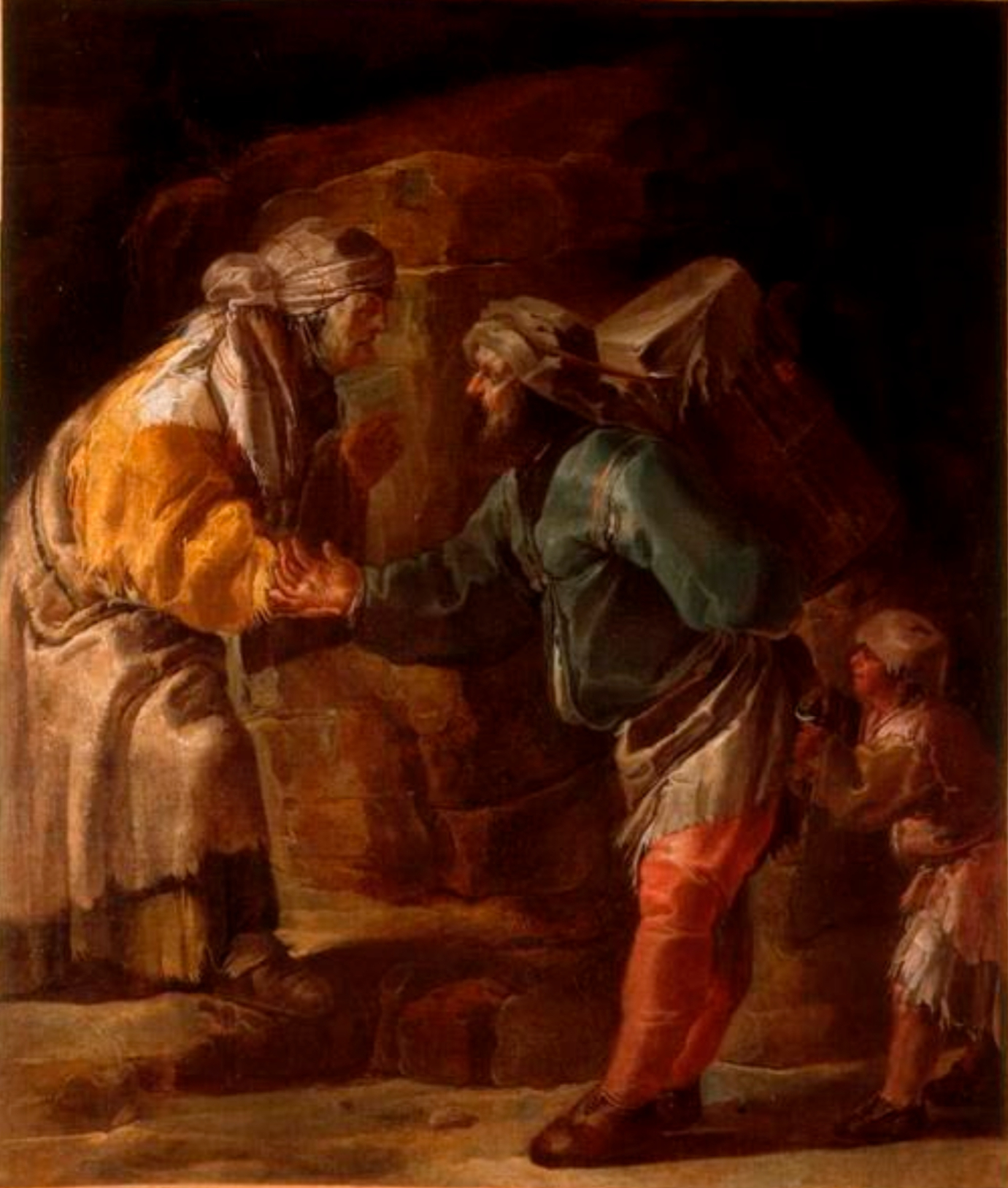
The fortune teller

Art historian Jacques Foucart from the Louvre corrected the wrong attribution in an article published in 1978. Foucart identified Pseudo-Van de Venne with another Jan van der Venne whom he identified as a Flemish artist. This identification of 'Pseudo-Van de Venne' with Jan van der Venne, an artist believed to have been born in Mechelen c. 1600, has since gained wide acceptance. Art historian Hans Vlieghe proposed in 1983 that the artist was born around 1600 in Mechelen.

== Life ==
Very little is known about Van der Venne's life and career. Even though some of the artist's works bear the mark of the Antwerp Guild of Saint Luke, he is believed to have been active mainly in Brussels. This view is supported by his relationships with prominent personalities in Brussels including at the court. Both Cardinal-infant Ferdinand and Archduke Leopold Wilhelm, governors of the Spanish Netherlands, were his patrons. Van der Venne is recorded as a master in the Guild of Saint Luke in Brussels in 1616.

He is believed to have been active as a painter as well as a gilder of moldings and perhaps even a painter of imitation marble on frames and altarpieces. He remained active in Brussels where he died in or before 1651 as is testified by a payment made to his wife in 1651 in which she is described as a widow.

== Work ==
=== General ===
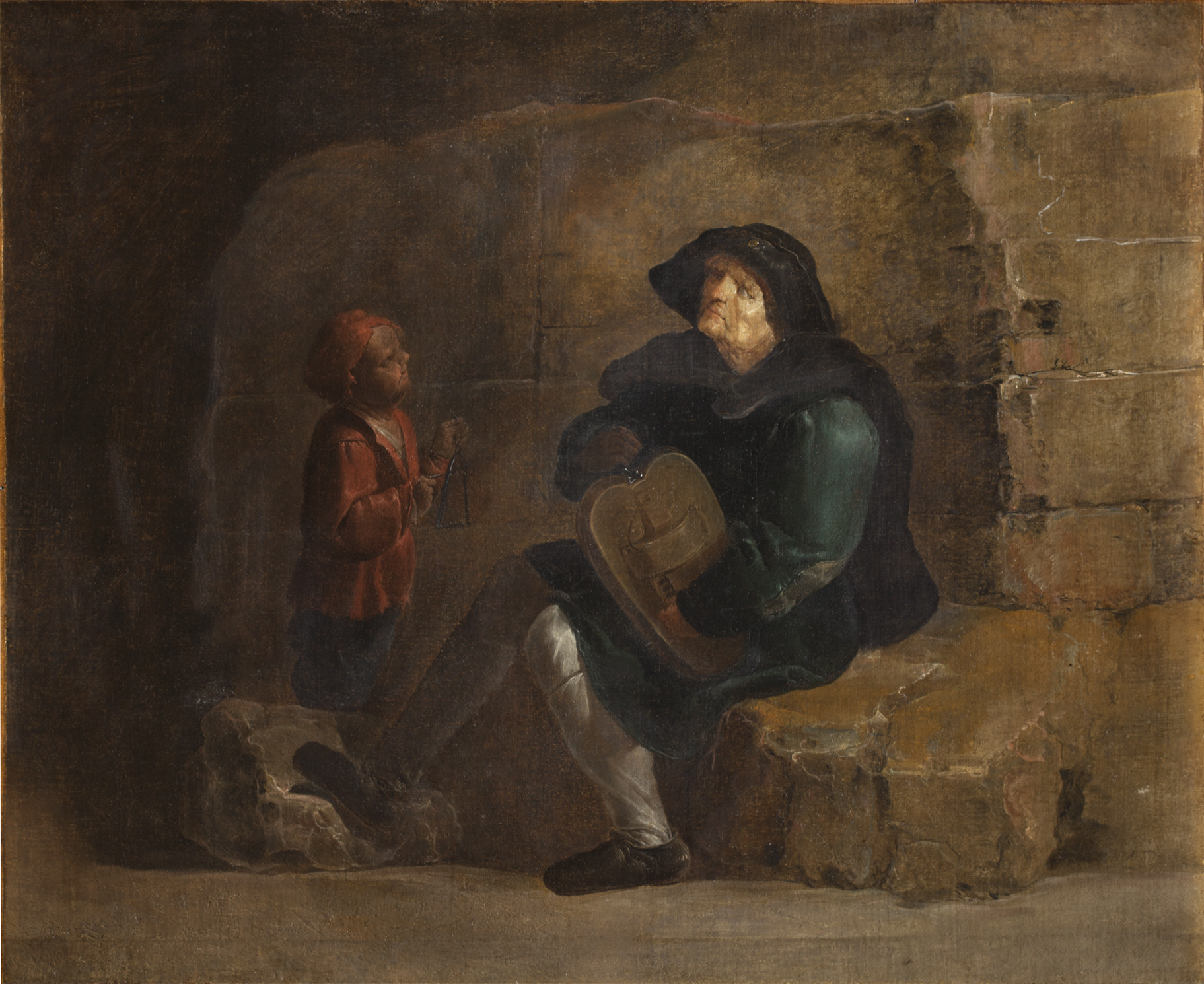
Hurdy-gurdy player

Only a few signed paintings by van der Venne are documented. His oeuvre has been reconstituted based on signed or documented works which show his very individual style, subjects, use of light and brilliancy. His works are typically small-scale oil-on-panel compositions.

Van der Venne specialised in caricatures of so-called 'low-life' subjects, such as card-players, tooth-pullers and musicians, and in expressive religious scenes. His paintings demonstrate harsh caricatures in a stronger light than Adriaen Brouwer.

=== Influences ===
Various historians have attempted to explain the origins of his style. They have identified a range of influences on the artist's work. His themes and style are reminiscent of his contemporary Flemish painter Adriaen Brouwer. His preference for brownish tonalities and themes are similar to those of Dutch painters such as Adriaen van Ostade, Benjamin Cuyp and Andries Both. His nervous style shows possibly the influence of David Teniers the Elder. Some historians have conjectured he may have studied under Teniers. Lucas van Leyden's engravings as well Adam Elsheimer's treatment of the effects of light and shade have been proposed as additional influences. Some of his works were formerly attributed to 'style of Rembrandt'.

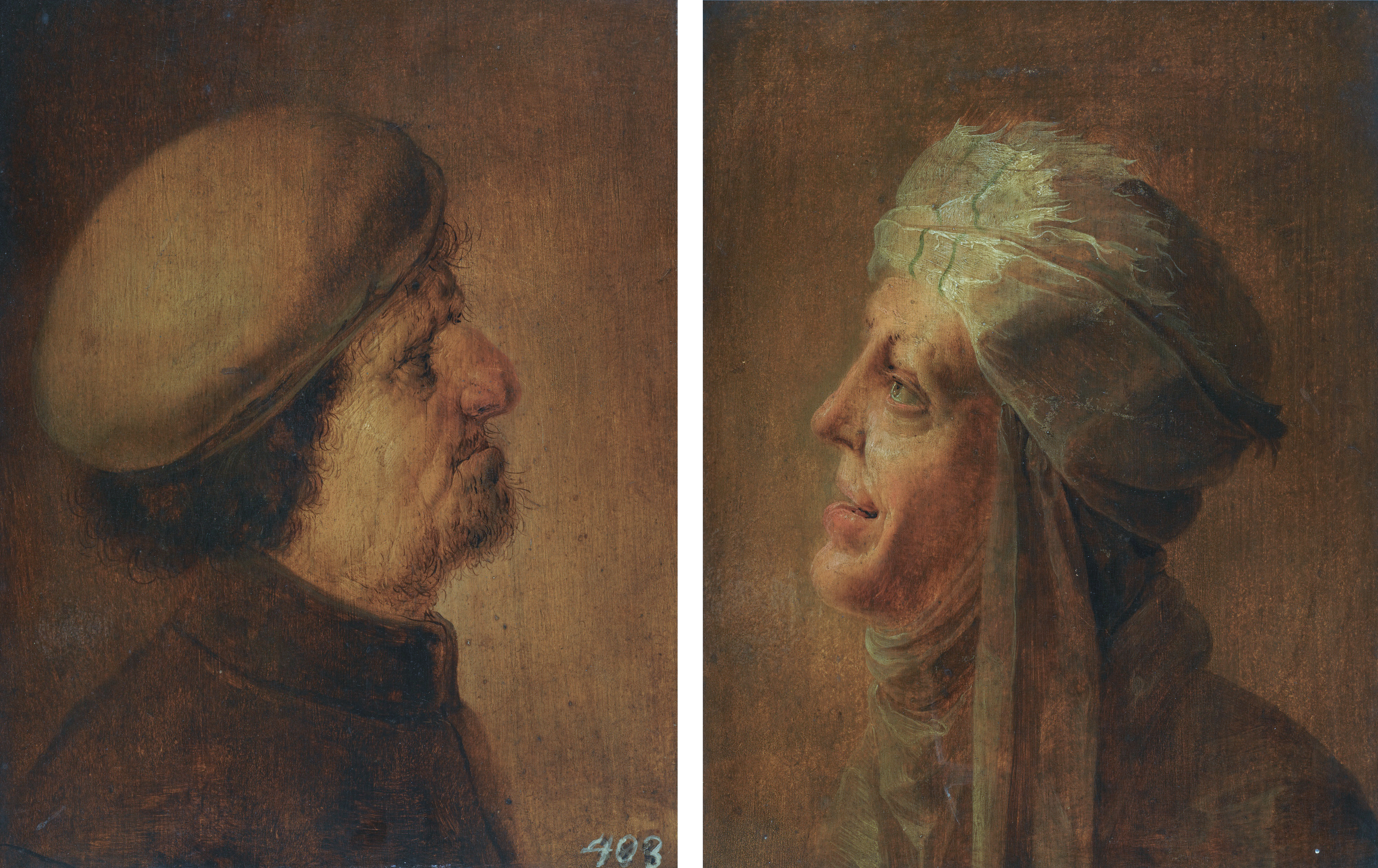
Heads of an old man and an old woman

Jan van der Venne is believed to have in turn exerted an influence on other contemporary artists. For instance the Dutch Bambocciante painter Andries Both is believed to have derived his propensity for caricature-like distortions of the faces and poses of his figures from the compositions of van der Venne.

=== Tronies ===
Many of his works are so-called 'tronies', i.e. caricatural portraits of heads. The squeaky misery of the characters often depicted in profile and the virtuosity of the pasty effects are close to the early production of Georges de La Tour. The use of light that make the clothes and folds flicker also evokes French late Mannerists such as Claude Vignon and Claude Deruet.

Jan van de Venne occasionally paired and juxtaposed two different tronies with each other.

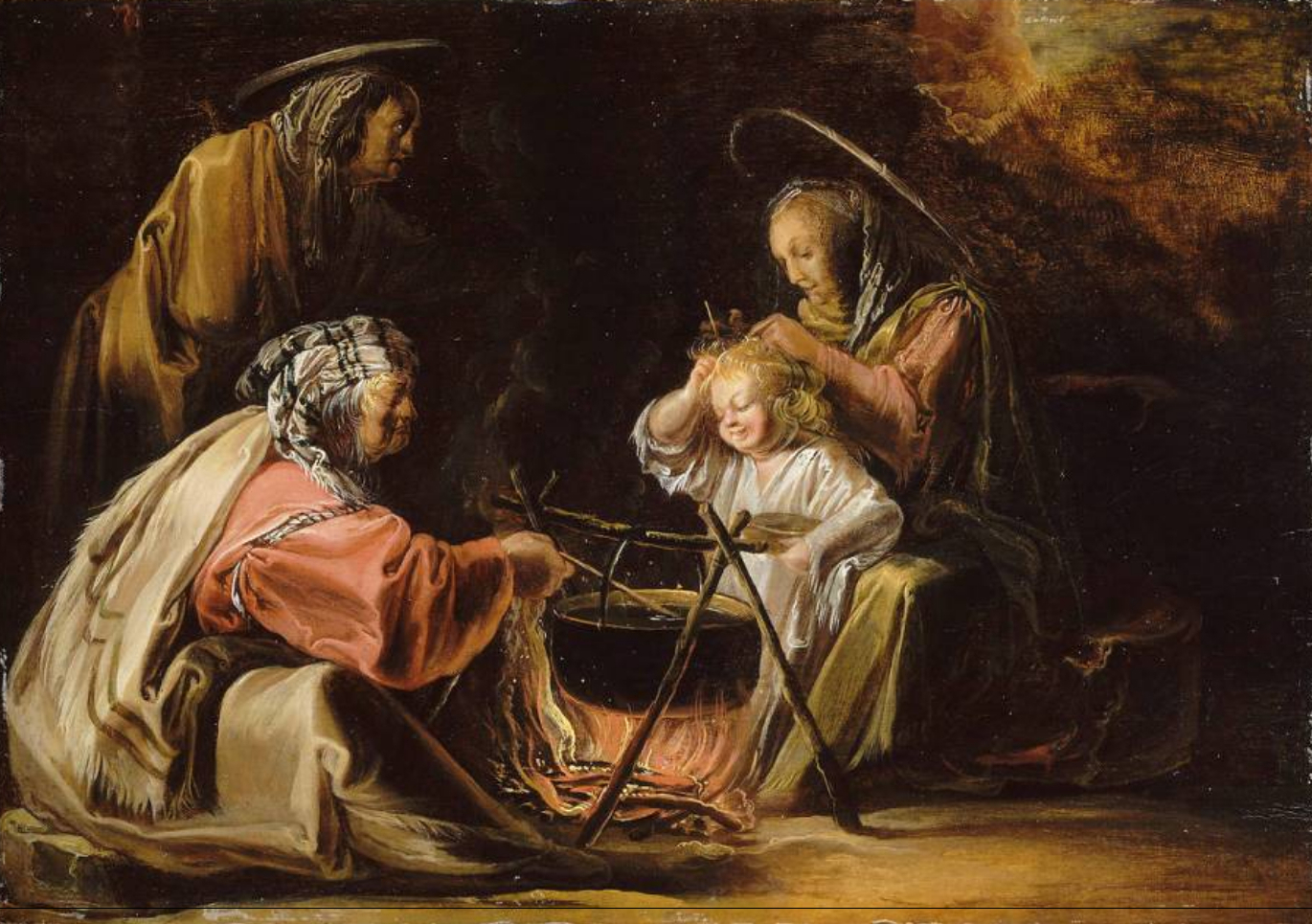
Gypsy camp, Louvre

=== Gypsy scenes ===
Jan van der Venne painted various scenes with gypsies. As many of these works ended up in collections in French museums (Aix-en Provence, Auxerre, Besançon, Chambéry, Dijon, Dunkirk, Hazebrouck, Lille, Marseille, Louvre, Quimper and Semur-en-Auxois) he earned the sobriquet 'le Maître des Tziganes' (the Master of the Gypsies) in France.

An example of one of his gypsy scenes is the Gypsy family at the Louvre, which shows a gypsy family preparing an outdoor meal over a fire while a woman is delousing a child's hair.

=== The Temptation of St Antony ===
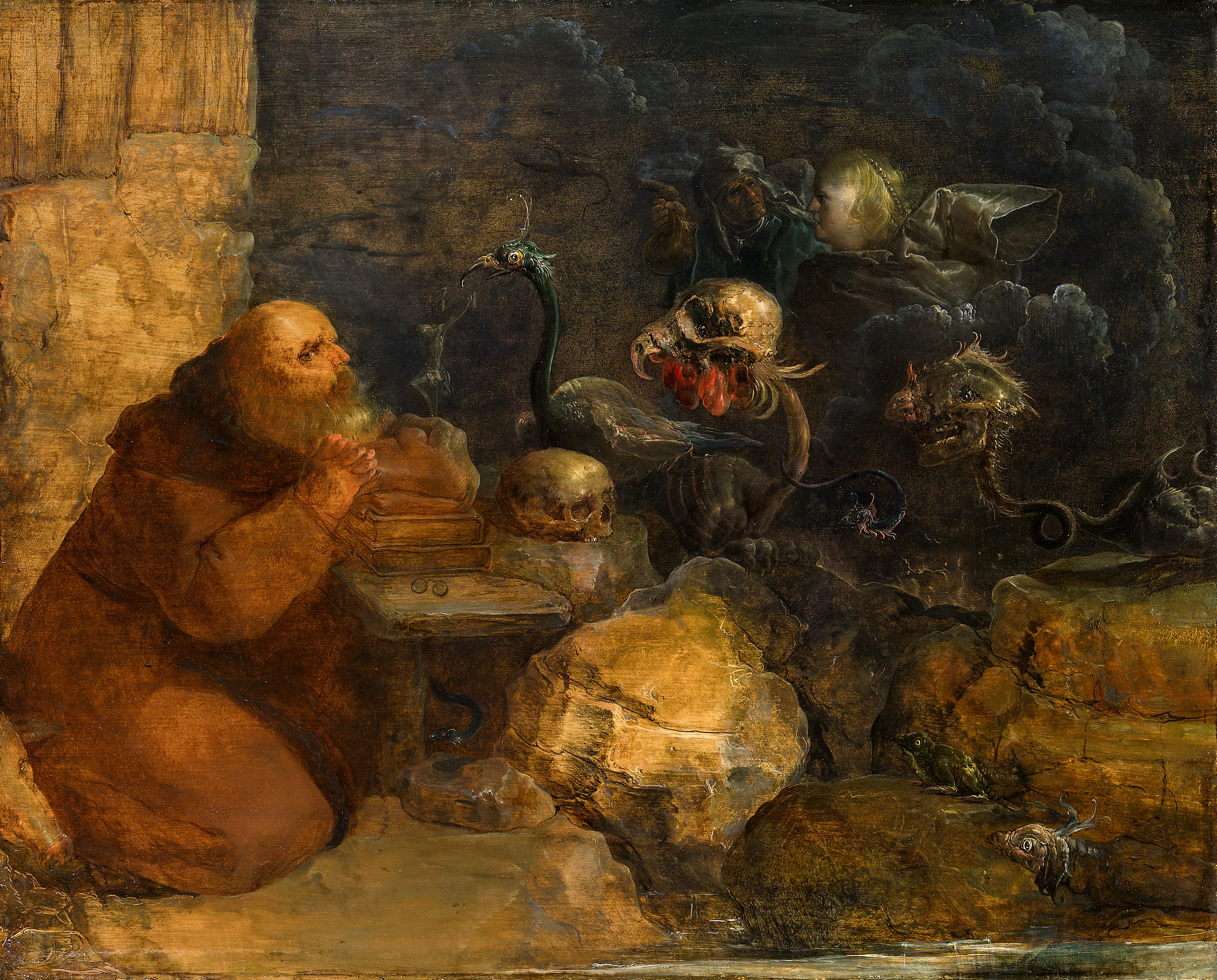
The Temptation of St Anthony

He painted various versions of The Temptation of St Antony. This subject was very popular in Flemish art from the late 15th century. Catholics regard Saint Anthony as a model to be emulated as he is believed to have resisted multiple temptations sent to him by the devil. Flemish paintings dealing with the theme of the temptation of Saint Anthony are typically populated with witches and monstrous creatures that tempt him. Van der Venne's versions of The Temptation of St Antony with different compositions are in museums in Dunkerque, Haarlem and Bath, and one was sold at Auktionshaus im Kinsky on 28 November 2013 in Vienna (as lot 2).

The version sold at Auktionshaus im Kinsky shows St Anthony in a cave kneeling in front of a table with books. To his right appear fanciful phantoms and in the background a witch with a young woman.
