= Phoebe (biblical figure) =

Biblical figure

Saint Phoebe

Deaconess, Witness to the Faith
- Born: 1st century
- Died: 1st century
- Venerated in: Catholic Church; Eastern Orthodox Church; Oriental Orthodox Church; Church of the East; Anglican Communion; Lutheran Church
- Canonized: Pre-Congregation
- Feast: September 3 (Catholic Church & Orthodox Churches); October 25 (Lutheran Church)

Phoebe (Koine Greek: Φοίβη) was a first-century Christian deacon mentioned by the Apostle Paul in his Epistle to the Romans, verses 16:1–2. A notable woman in the church of Cenchreae, she was trusted by Paul to deliver his letter to the Romans. Paul refers to her both as a "deacon" (Greek diakonos) and as a helper or patron of many (Greek prostatis). This is the only place in the New Testament where a woman is specifically referred to with these two distinctions. Paul introduces Phoebe as his emissary to the church in Rome and, because they are not acquainted with her, Paul provides them with her credentials.

== Background ==
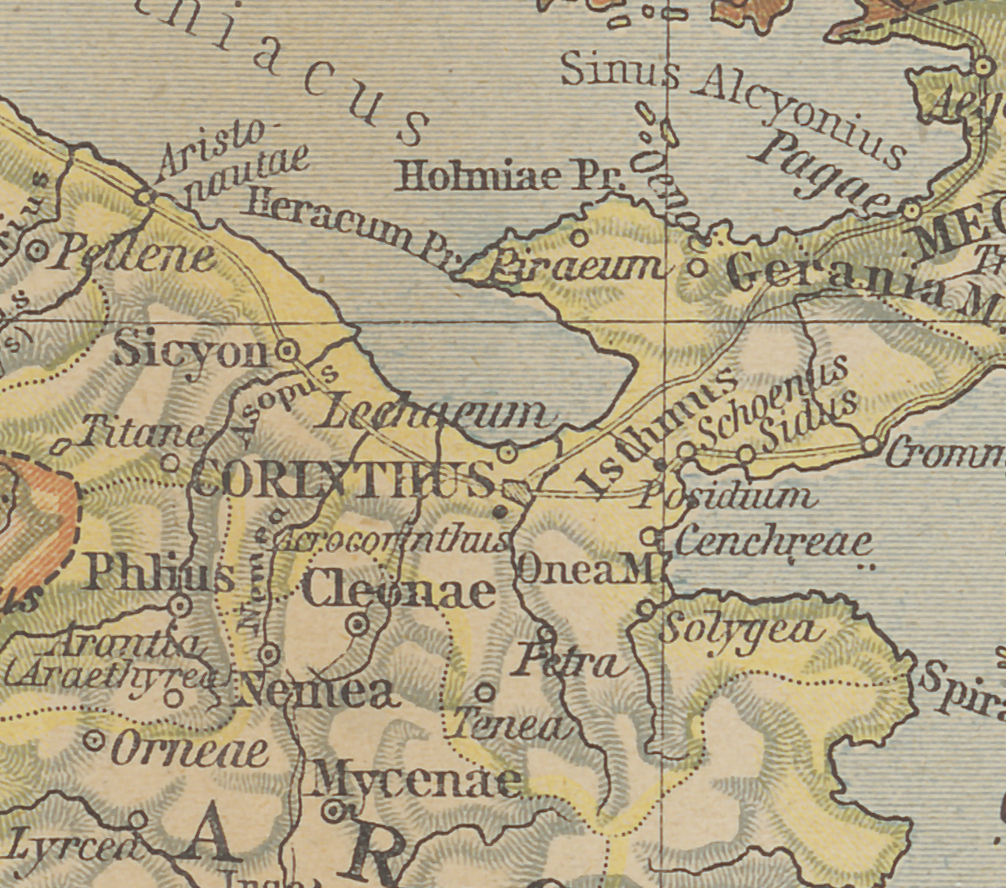
Map showing ancient Cenchreae

Paul's letter to the Romans was written in Corinth sometime between the years 56 and 58 in order to solicit support for an anticipated missionary journey to Spain. Although he had not yet visited Rome, Paul would have been familiar with the community and its circumstances through Priscilla and Aquila, who were in Corinth, having previously lived in Rome. Biblical scholars are divided as to whether Chapter 16, Paul's letter of recommendation for Phoebe, was intended for Rome, with whose Christian community he was not acquainted, or with the more familiar community at Ephesus.

I commend to you our sister Phoebe, deacon of the church in Cenchreae. I ask you to receive her in the Lord in a way worthy of his people and to give her any help she may need from you, for she has been the benefactor of many people, including me.

— Paul

The name Phoebe means "pure", "radiant", or "bright"; and was the name of a Titan in Greek mythology.

Some scholars believe Phoebe was responsible for delivering Paul's epistle to the Roman Christian church.

Phoebe is the only woman named as deacon (which means "servant" in Greek) in the Bible.

== Greek terms for her titles ==
=== diakonos ===
Apostle Paul used the Greek diakonos (διάκονος) to designate Phoebe as a deacon. "Deacon" is a transliteration of the Greek, and in Paul's writings sometimes refers to a Christian designated to serve as a specially-appointed "assistant" to the overseers of a church, and at others refers to "servants" in a general sense. However, at this inaugural stage in the Church's formation, some argue, it is premature to think of offices as being consistent or clearly defined, and biblical scholar Rosalba Manes argues that Paul's use of the term "deacon" suggests that, like Stephen and Philip, Phoebe's ministry may have extended beyond charitable works to include preaching and evangelization.

==== "Likewise the women" ====
There is some debate over whether the women referred to in 1 Timothy 3:11 are to be considered deacons or not. When describing the qualities that the office-holders called "deacons" must possess, Paul wrote gunaikas hosautos, which is translated by some as "likewise the women." The "likewise" could indicate that female deacons are to live according to the same standards as male deacons (see also the Apostle Paul's use of the term "likewise" in Romans 1:27, 1 Cor. 7:3,4,22, and Titus 2:3,6). The predominant view holds that this verse refers not to female deacons, but instead to the wives of deacons. See, for example, the KJV rendering: "Even so must their wives be grave, not slanderers, sober, faithful in all things."

=== prostatis ===
In classical Greek the word prostates (προστάτης) (feminine, prostatis) was used to mean either a chief or leader, or a guardian or protector, often in a religious context; it was later used also to translate the Roman concept of a patron. The Apostle Paul's use indicates that its range of meanings had not changed by New Testament times. This suggests that Phoebe was a woman of means, who, among other things, contributed financial support to Paul's apostolate, and probably hosted the house church of Cenchreae in her home, as well as providing shelter and hospitality to Paul when in the town.

== Veneration ==
The Catholic Church, Eastern Orthodox Church and Episcopal Church in the United States of America place her feast day as September 3 (the latter designating it a Lesser Feast).

The Lutheran Church–Missouri Synod remembers her later, on October 25. The Calendar of Saints of the Evangelical Lutheran Church in America commemorates Phoebe with Lydia of Thyatira and Dorcas on January 27, the day after the commemoration of the early male missionaries Silas, Timothy and Titus and two days after the feast of the Conversion of St. Paul.

== See also ==
- Romans 16
- Junia
