= Tentmaking =

Christian term

Tentmaking, in general, refers to the activities of any Christian who, while dedicating herself or himself to the ministry of the Gospel, receives little or no pay for Church work, but performs other ("tentmaking") jobs to provide support. Specifically, tentmaking can also refer to a method of international Christian evangelism in which missionaries support themselves by working full-time in the marketplace with their skills and education, instead of receiving financial support from a Church. The term comes from the fact that the apostle Paul supported himself by making tents while living and preaching in Corinth (Acts 18:3)

== History ==
Unlike Peter and other apostles in the early Christian Church, who devoted themselves entirely to their religious ministry and lived off the money donated by Church members (see Acts 4:34-37), Paul frequently performed outside work, not desiring to be a financial burden to the young Churches he founded. In Thessaloniki, Paul states that he and his companions "worked night and day, laboring and toiling so that we would not be a burden to any of you" (2 Thessalonians 3:8). Paul's purpose in working was to set an example for the Christians, desiring that they did not become idle in their expectation of the return of Christ, but that they would work to support themselves. He also hoped that his refusal to accept financial support would build his credibility among non-Christians, thus giving him the chance to win over more of them (See 1 Corinthians 9, particularly verse 12). For additional glimpses into the Apostle Paul's tentmaking ministry see Acts 18:1-3; 20:33-35; Philippians 4:14-16.

Financial support is not the only essence of tentmaking. Instead, the vocational identity coupled with excellence of work and lifestyle influences colleagues to follow Jesus Christ.

== Modern times ==
More recently, William Carey (1761-1831), considered to be the father of modern evangelical Christian missions, was a tentmaker in India, working as a factory owner and university professor while fulfilling his mission duties. At the time, international mission work was a new and controversial idea in the Church, and tentmaking was the only way for Carey to support his ministry. His example has led thousands of Christian missionaries to support themselves while ministering overseas.

Furthermore, tentmaking sometimes provides Christians the chance to serve in countries normally closed to mission work. Governments hostile to Christianity often accept well-qualified teachers, doctors, computer technicians, and engineers into their countries to work, even if these men and women are Christians. These professionals are thus able to serve the country and support themselves while performing missions work.

In the Catholic and Orthodox Churches, the term "working clergy" is used to denote men who, whether assigned or not to a parish, must provide for themselves. More often than not, these are married priests who take positions in hospitals or other charitable institutions, although some can be solicitors or school teachers as well. A famous example of a working clergyman was the Orthodox Saint Luke (Voino-Yasenetsky), Bishop of Simferopol and Crimea, who continued to work as a surgeon and medical doctor even after his ordination.

== Digital times, blogging ==
Currently more and more laypersons and ministry professionals are spending time online via their blogs and using them to earn an income, both passive and active, through direct advertising sales, affiliate marketing, or promoting other products and services related to their work outside of ministry proper.

They have been referred as "Digital Tentmakers" or "TentBloggers" (tentblogging), those that make money through their blogs.

== See also ==
- Worker-Priest
