= African and African-American women in Christianity =

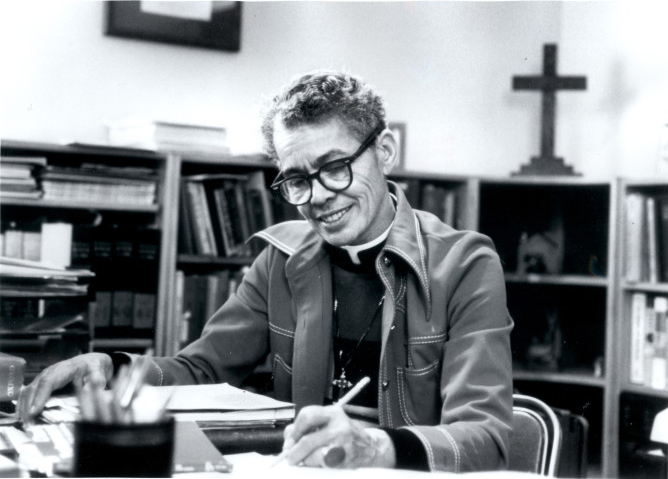
Pauli Murray

Women of African descent have always been active in Christianity since the very early days of this religion. African-American women mainly worship in traditionally black Protestant churches, with 62% identifying themselves as historically black Protestants. Many hold leadership positions in these churches and some lead congregations, especially in the American deep south. Black women also have served as nuns in the Catholic Church in the United States since the early 19th century.

== Contributions to Christianity ==
=== Protestantism ===
Black women have been active in the Protestant churches since before the emancipation proclamation, which allowed slave churches to become legitimized. Women began serving in church leadership positions early on, and today two mainstream churches, the American Baptist Churches USA and the Evangelical Lutheran Church in America, have women in their top leadership positions. Susan Gillies is the general secretary of the American Baptist Churches USA and Elizabeth Eaton is the presiding bishop of the Evangelical Lutheran Church in America. The Episcopal Church has had a female presiding Bishop before, as Katharine Jefferts Schori was Bishop from 2006 to 2015, and the United Methodist Church had a female President of the Bishops, Rosemarie Wenner.

=== Catholicism ===
Women are not allowed to hold priesthood office in the Catholic Church, so no Priests, Bishops, Cardinals, or Popes have ever been women. Women are allowed to serve as nuns, however, and many black women have chosen this path. In addition to this, a few black women from the very early days of the Church have been enshrined as Saints. The first Catholic women to found their own Religious communities were the Oblate Sisters of Providence in Baltimore.

== Notable African and African-American women ==
=== Sojourner Truth ===
Sojourner Truth was a female black lay minister for the Methodist church. She was freed from slavery after escaping in 1826, was one of the first black women to ever successfully sue a white man, and converted to Methodism in 1843. She delivered many speeches and sermons, the most famous of which was her 1851 address, "Ain't I a woman?". She saved a Northampton camp meeting in 1844 when, while a small mob entered the encampment during a sermon of a different female preacher, she began to sing on a nearby hill and calmed both the worshipers and the mob, leading to the mob leaving. She delivered an address in Boston on the eighth anniversary of the Emancipation proclamation in which she admitted that although once hating white people for what they had done to her, and hating her masters, once she found her final master, Jesus, she was filled with love towards all people.

=== Coretta Scott King ===
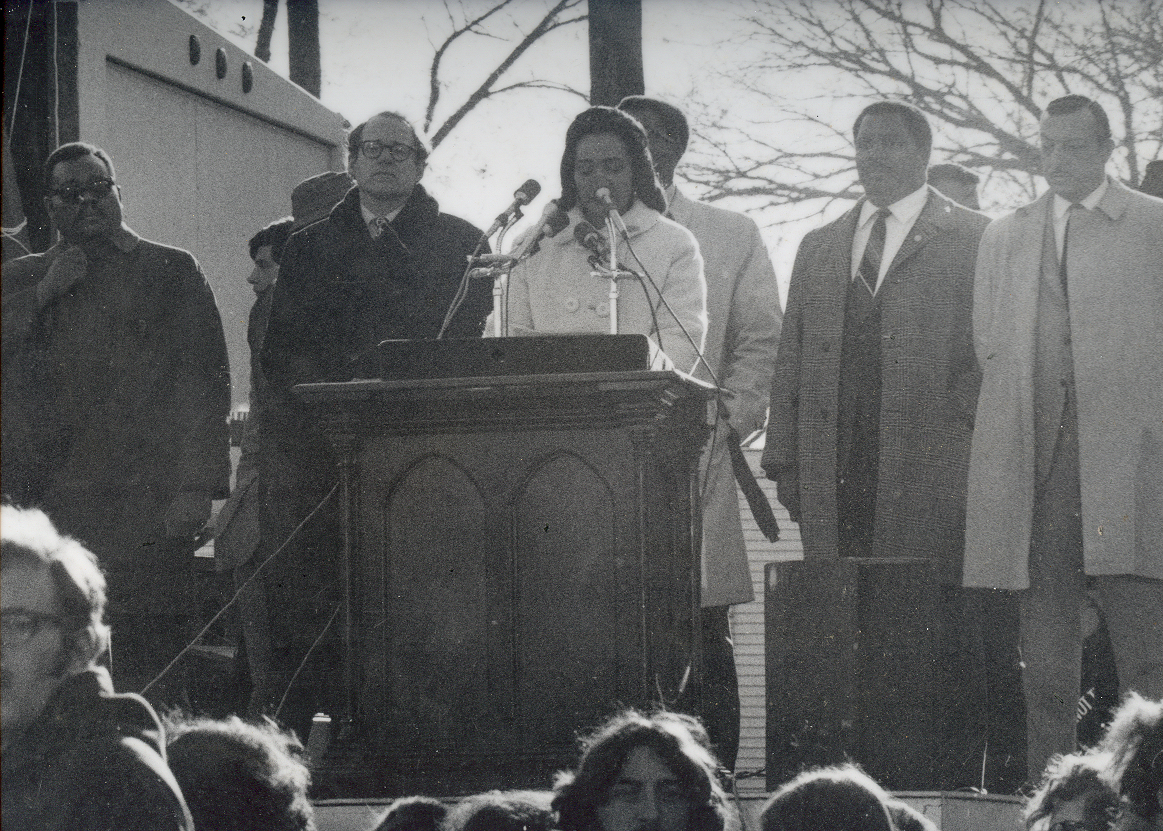
Coretta Scott King

Coretta Scott King was the wife of Martin Luther King Jr. She was famous during the civil rights movement and not simply because she was the spouse of Martin Luther King Jr. She was known for her singing ability and promoted her husband's civil rights efforts and raised money for the cause. King was a devout Christian; her husband was the co-pastor of the Ebenezer Baptist Church. Her husband founded the Southern Christian Leadership Conference and she was appointed as the frontwoman of the organization. In her memoir, King notes her role in helping and supporting her husband's profession of ecclesiastical leadership. She assisted in writing sermons and embraced, for the most part, the private practices of her husband, including a dedication to limit materialism in their lives.

=== Betsey Stockton ===
Betsey Stockton was an African American missionary and teacher in antebellum United States. She was raised by the President of Princeton, who noticed her intellect and granted her a spot at Princeton when she came of age. In 1822 she became a missionary and set sail with a group from the Princeton Theological Seminary to Hawaii. In doing this, Stockton became the first single female to set sail from America on a mission. She became the teacher of the first mission school opened to common Hawaiians. After returning to the United States in 1825, she helped found Princeton's First Presbyterian Church of Color.

=== Clara Brown ===
Clara Brown was a slave in Kentucky before she gained her freedom at age 56 and was required by law to leave. She, as well as other African Americans, fled to Denver. Brown was a key community and religious leader in Denver. She began holding prayer services in her home which eventually evolved into the formation of a non-denominational Protestant Church. Her home was always open as a place of worship and refuge for those in need. Her nickname "Aunt Clara" embodied the way her community viewed her and her efforts. She acquired large amounts of wealth by capitalizing on the need for services, especially laundry, and oftentimes used her wealth to benefit the community and poor.

=== Jane Elizabeth Manning James ===
Jane Elizabeth Manning James was born free in Connecticut and became a Presbyterian at a young age. She heard a sermon by a missionary for the Church of Jesus Christ of Latter-day Saints, converted and was baptized to this sect in 1842. She had several unique, recorded spiritual experiences and eventually decided to move west in 1843. Denied their passage to Nauvoo by boat, she and nine other African-American members of the Church walked the 800 miles to Nauvoo to unite with the rest of their church. She endured the same persecution that other members of the Church of Jesus Christ endured at this time. James moved west with the Church in 1847, eventually settling in the Salt Lake valley, thereby becoming one of the first black women to live in Utah.

=== Phillis Wheatley ===
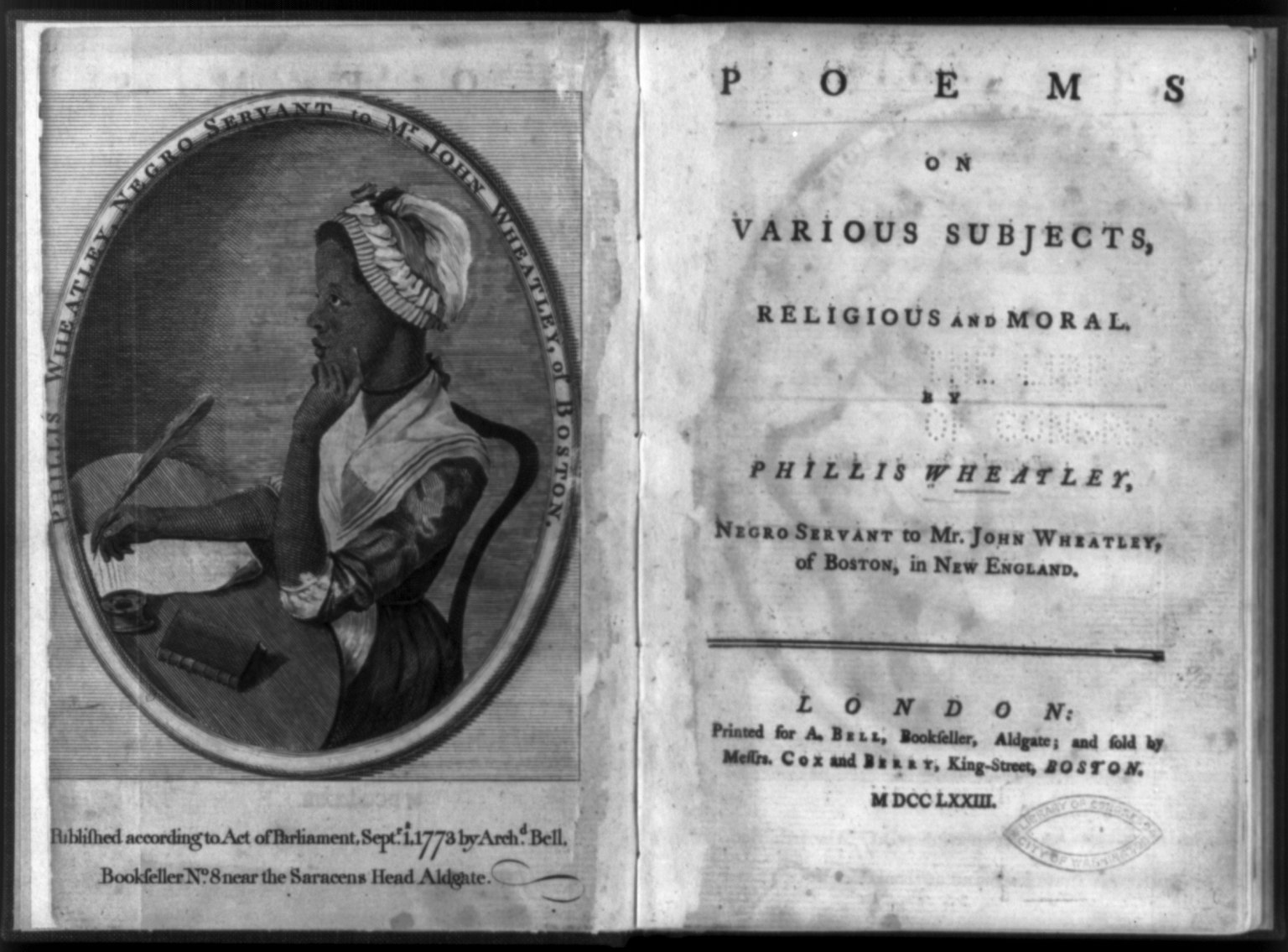
Phyllis Wheatley, writing a poem

Phillis Wheatley was one of the first black Christian women to be recognized in the United States. She was sold a slave in the mid 1700s as a child and was a slave much of her life. She learned to read and write and excelled at writing poetry. Her poetry made her very noteworthy and even garnered attention from ranking government members including President George Washington. Wheatley would write poems about political issues but was most well known for her religious writings. Wheatley was a pioneer of Christian writings, not to simply praise God, but to highlight the problem of slavery in a Christian context.

=== St. Josephine Bakhita ===
St. Josephine Margaret Bakhita was born in 1869 in the Sudan. She was kidnapped in 1877 and became enslaved. She was brutally tortured while enslaved and was bought and sold several times until she was sold to the Italian Vice Consul in 1883, Callisto Legani. She moved to Italy with her owners shortly after that. When her mistress traveled to Sudan, she left Josephine in the care of Canossian Sisters in Venice. While here, Josephine became converted to Catholicism and refused to leave the Sisters. After gaining her freedom through legal action, she stayed at the monastery, becoming baptized and a nun. She worked at the monastery for 42 years, dying in 1947. During World War Two, the village of Schio believed that St. Josephine protected them from harm, for no village residents died from the bombing during the war.

=== Mother Mary Lange ===
Originally known as Elizabeth Lange, Lange was born in Haiti in 1784. Revolutions forced her to Cuba where she received her education. She eventually moved to Baltimore where a relatively large population of French Speaking Blacks lived. She was lucky to have an education as a black woman in the United States, which was possible due to her father's wealth as a merchant. The free school that she created eventually transformed into a Catholic religious institution to educate young black women. This led to the first association of black nuns in the United States called the "Oblate Sisters of Providence". This association still exists to this day as has been helping do humanitarian work since Mother Mary Lange's death in 1882.

=== Jarena Lee ===
Jarena Lee was born in 1783 as a free person. As a child in New Jersey she was a housemaid. She was not raised to be Christian by her parents, but she felt inclined to believe religious teachings. She recalls her conversion taking place during a sermon by a preacher named Richard Allen. Lee believed that her sins were taken away from her as the spirit of Christ was laid upon her. Lee had desires to spread the gospel that had changed her life and was appointed the first female to be a preacher in the African Methodist Episcopal Church. Her service as a missionary and a preacher slowed during her only marriage, but it picked up after her husband died shortly into the marriage. Jarena Lee surpassed gender expectations and was a legitimate force in conversion in the United States. She died in 1864.

=== Saints Felicitas and Perpetua ===
Saints Felicitas and Perpetua, two African Catholic saints, were martyred in 203 AD, and were some of the first female African martyrs of the early Church. They were living in Carthage when they confessed their belief in Christ and were imprisoned and sentenced to death. Perpetua was a mother, and her own father attempted many times to convince her to renounce her faith and be freed, however she did not. Saturus, another Christian who was jailed with them, and Perpetua recorded the events in the prison and published this book, Passion of Saint Perpetua, Saint Felicitas, and their Companions. It is known as one of the oldest surviving Christian texts.

=== Pauli Murray ===
Pauli Murray was born in 1910 in Baltimore. Her mother died when she was four from a brain injury and her father was murdered when she was thirteen. Her education in New York was halted due to the economic crash in 1929. She was involved in New Deal programs like the WPA before she was able to try to go to school again at Harvard. She became a very prominent civil rights leader in the 1940s as she sought to be a lawyer to protect civil rights. She noted that the civil rights movement as well as church leadership was dominated by men. She was able to positively affect this issue as she became one of the first female Episcopal Priests in 1977. She was even able to go back to her hometown of Durham, North Carolina, and preach her first sermon. She accomplished much in her life despite her being an orphan, being discriminated against because of her gender, and also struggling with her sexual identity. She died of pancreatic cancer in 1985.

== Leadership roles ==
=== Women's leadership in Protestant denominations ===
In 1970, Black women held about 3% of leadership roles. By 1990, this figure had risen to 19%. In 1890, 7% of black women in Protestant churches were given full clergy rights, but 100 years later 50% had these same rights. Often, women do not receive the higher level or more visible roles. They are allowed to preach occasionally, and participate and preside over many rites and ordinances, but are not the leaders of the congregation.

== See also ==
- Women in Christianity
- Women in the Bible
- Women in Church History
- Woman's Bible
- Gender and Religion
- Women and Religion
