= Women in Christianity =

Women have played important roles in Christianity especially in marriage and in formal ministry positions within certain Christian denominations, and parachurch organizations. Although more males are born than females naturally, and in 2014, the global population included 300 million more males of reproductive age than females (mainly in the Far East) in 2016, it was estimated that 52–53 percent of the world's Christian population aged 20 years and over was female, with this figure falling to 51.6 percent in 2020. The Pew Research Center studied the effects of gender on religiosity throughout the world, finding that Christian women in 53 countries are generally more religious than Christian men, while Christians of both genders in African countries are equally likely to regularly attend services.

The New Testament which is the core of the Christian faith, begins with the Gospel of Matthew. Judaism finds its strength in the study of Jewish scripture and vigorous debate as to its meaning, which was not considered blasphemy then nor down to the present day. Jesus is challenged by the priests with the question if a woman can divorce a man, since Moses himself mentions only a writ of divorce from a man. Jesus claims that men and women are equal in God's eyes because in the beginning God made humankind male and female. If a man can divorce, so can a woman, but it is better to remain one flesh. Throughout the Gospels, he defends the spirituality of women and gathers both boys and girls around him, curing the ailments of both. In perhaps his best known defense of a woman about to be stoned for adultery he challenges anyone without sin to cast the first stone.

Many leadership roles in his day, such as that of priests of the Temple, were taken by men, as they were the family wage-earners. In later centuries, the church organised around the belief of Christ's messianic role maintained the division of labor between men and women, although in the long centuries before the advent of more widely accessible birth control, a woman who preferred an intellectual path could join a convent.

Many churches in modern times have come to hold an egalitarian view regarding women's roles in the church. In the Roman Catholic and Orthodox churches, only men may serve as priests or elders (bishops, presbyters and deacons); only celibate males serve in senior leadership positions such as pope, patriarch, and cardinals. Women may serve as abbesses and consecrated virgins. A number of mainstream Protestant denominations are beginning to relax their longstanding constraints on ordaining women to be ministers (priesthood), though some large groups, most notably the Southern Baptist Convention, are tightening their constraints in reaction. Most all Charismatic and Pentecostal churches were pioneers in this matter, and have embraced allowing women to preach since their founding. Other Protestant denominations such as the Quakers have also embraced female preachers since their inception; the Shakers, a Protestant monastic denomination that originated from the Quakers, were also distinctly egalitarian in their original leadership.

Christian traditions that officially recognise saints as persons of exceptional holiness venerate many women as saints. Most prominent is Mary, mother of Jesus who is highly revered throughout Christianity, particularly in Roman Catholicism and Eastern Orthodoxy, where she is considered the "Mother of God". Both the apostles Paul and Peter held women in high regard and worthy of prominent positions in the church, though they were careful not to encourage anyone to disregard the New Testament household codes, also known as New Testament Domestic Codes or Haustafelen. The significance of women as the first to witness the resurrection of Jesus has been recognised across the centuries. There were efforts by the apostles Paul and Peter to encourage brand new first-century Christians to obey the Patria Potestas (lit. 'Rule of the Fathers') of Greco-Roman law. The New Testament written record of their efforts (Note: A number of epistles found in the New Testament, and traditionally attributed to Peter and Paul, are held by some modern-day scholars to have been written by other authors writing in their style, passing their own works off entirely as that of another's without copying their writing style, or summarising their teachings. See Authorship of the Bible#New Testament for further information.) in this regard is found in Colossians 3:18–4:1, Ephesians 5:22–6:9, 1 Peter 2:13–3:7, Titus 2:1–10 and 1 Timothy 2:1, 3:1, 3:8, 5:17, and 6:1. As may be seen throughout the Old Testament and in the Greco-Roman culture of New Testament time, patriarchal societies placed men in positions of authority in marriage, society and government. The New Testament only records males being named among the 12 original apostles of Jesus Christ. Yet, women were the first to discover the Resurrection of Christ.

Some Christians believe clerical ordination and the conception of priesthood post-date the New Testament and that it contains no specifications for such ordination or distinction. Others cite uses of the terms presbyter and episkopos, as well as 1 Timothy 3:1–7 or Ephesians 4:11–16, as evidence to the contrary. The early church developed a monastic tradition which included the institution of the convent through which women developed religious orders of sisters and nuns, an important ministry of women which has continued to the present day in the establishment of schools, hospitals, nursing homes and monastic settlements.

== Theology ==
Mary, the Mother of Jesus, Mary Magdalene, Mary of Bethany and her sister Martha have been among the women identified as key to the establishment of Christianity. Karen L. King, Harvard University Professor of New Testament Studies and the History of Ancient Christianity, writes that the history of women in ancient Christianity has been almost completely revised in the last twenty years. Many more women are being added to the list of women who made very significant contributions in the early history of Christianity. The new history comes primarily from recent discoveries of biblical text that had been neglected through the ages.

The belief that Mary Magdalene was an adulteress and a repentant prostitute can be traced back to an Easter homily given by Pope Gregory the Great in 591, when the pope conflated Mary Magdalene, who was introduced in Luke 8:2, with Mary of Bethany (Luke 10:39) and the unnamed "sinful woman" who anointed Jesus's feet in Luke 7:36–50. The historical error became the generally accepted view in Western Christianity. Karen King concludes that the discoveries of new texts by biblical scholars, combined with their sharpened critical insight, have now proved beyond any doubt that the disreputable portrait of Mary Magdalene is entirely inaccurate.

Mary Magdalene was a prominent disciple and significant leader in the early Christian movement. Her designation as the very first apostle of Jesus has helped promote contemporary awareness of the leadership of women in Christianity.

The New Testament gospels, written toward the last quarter of the first century CE, acknowledge that women were among Jesus earliest followers:

- From the beginning, Jewish women disciples, including Mary Magdalene, Joanna, and Susanna, had accompanied Jesus during his ministry and supported him out of their private means.
- Jesus spoke to women both in public and private and allowed them to set examples of faith. According to two gospel accounts, an unnamed Gentile woman understood and was praised by Jesus when arguing that his ministry is not limited to particular groups and persons, but belongs to all who have faith.
- A Jewish woman honored him with the extraordinary hospitality of washing his feet with perfume.
- Jesus was a frequent visitor at the home of Mary and Martha, and was in the habit of teaching and eating meals with women as well as men.
- When Jesus was arrested, women remained firm, even when his male disciples fled into hiding. Women accompanied him to the foot of the cross.
- It was women who were the first witnesses to the resurrection, chief among them being Mary Magdalene. These gospel accounts reflect the prominent historical roles that women played in Jesus' ministry as disciples.

In Christianity: A Very Short Introduction, Linda Woodhead notes the earliest Christian theological basis for forming a position on the roles of women is in the Book of Genesis where readers are drawn to the conclusion that women are beneath men and that the image of God shines more brightly in men than women. The following New Testament passages and more recent theological beliefs have contributed to the interpretation of roles of women in Christianity through the centuries:

- "But women will be saved through childbearing—if they continue in faith, love and holiness with propriety."
- "The husband rules the house, governs the state politic, conducts wars, defends his own property, cultivates the earth, builds, plants, etc. The woman on the other hand as a nail driven into the wall sits at home." (Martin Luther, Commentary on Genesis)
- "Properly speaking, the business of woman, her task and function is to actualize the fellowship in which man can only precede her, stimulating, leading, inspiring." (Karl Barth, Church Dogmatics)

=== Biblical authority and inerrancy ===
In general, all evangelicals involved in the gender debate claim to adhere to the authority of the Bible. Egalitarians typically argue that the dispute has arisen because of differences in interpretation of specific passages. Nevertheless, Wayne Grudem and other complementarians have accused egalitarians of adopting positions which deny the authority, sufficiency and inerrancy of scripture:

I believe that ultimately, the effective authority of Scripture to govern our lives is at stake in this controversy. The issue is not whether we say we believe the Bible is the Word of God or that we believe it is without error, but the issue is whether we actually obey it when its teachings are unpopular and conflict with the dominant viewpoints in our culture. If we do not obey it, then the effective authority of God to govern His people and His church through His Word has been eroded.

— Wayne Grudem (emphases original), Evangelical Feminism and Biblical Truth

=== Church practice ===
Christian leaders throughout history have been patriarchal, taking names that downplay female leadership in the church. These include "father", "abbot" or "abba" (meaning 'father'), and "pope" or "papa" (also meaning 'father'). Linda Woodhead notes that such language excludes women from such roles. She also notes a sentiment in 1 Corinthians, which exemplifies the pattern of Christianity of all varieties, where Paul explains that women should be veiled in the church to signal their subordination to men because the head of every man is Christ and the head of a woman is her husband and that women should keep silence in the churches. As the law states, they should be subordinate, not permitted to speak.

However, some Christians disagree with the idea that women should not have leadership positions, popular female preachers like Joyce Meyer, Paula White and Kathryn Kuhlman have had leadership roles in Church. It is mentioned in the Old Testament that women such as Deborah and Huldah were prophets. In the New Testament, Philip was said to have four daughters who prophesied.

=== Biblical inerrancy ===
The egalitarian and complementarian positions differ significantly in their approach to hermeneutics, and specifically in their interpretation of biblical history. Christian egalitarians believe that males and females were created equally without any hierarchy of roles, as God created both woman and man in his own image and likeness. God made the first couple equal partners in leadership over the earth. Both were jointly commissioned to be fruitful and multiply, to fill the earth, subdue the earth and rule over it. At the Fall, God prophesied to Eve that one result of sin entering the human race would be that her husband would rule over her.

Conservative Christian theologian Gilbert Bilezikian points out that throughout the Old Testament era and beyond, just as God had prophesied, men continued to rule over women in a patriarchal system which he sees as being a compromise or accommodation between sinful reality and the divine ideal. The coming of Jesus is understood as moving forward from Old Testament patriarchy, re-instituting full equality of gender roles, as succinctly articulated in Galatians 3:28.

New Testament passages, such as "Wives, be subject to your husbands, as to the Lord. For the husband is the head of the wife as Christ is the head of the church, his body, and is himself its Saviour. As the church is subject to Christ, so let wives also be subject in everything to their husbands" which teaches submission of wives to husbands, are typically understood by egalitarians as a temporary accommodation to a harsh 1st century culture where Roman law Patria Potestas gave fathers enormous power over the familia which included wife, children, slaves, and adult dependents. That power give the father/husband the right to kill his wife under a variety of circumstances.

Bilezikian writes that "the poison of hierarchy generated by the fall (of mankind) had permeated relationships to such an extent that those very disciples Jesus was training in the ways of servant hood insisted on substituting hierarchy for servanthood. They kept competing among themselves for the highest status and for positions of preeminence." Bilezikian continues: "To settle the issue once for all times, Jesus sharply delineated the basic difference between social organisation in the secular world and in the Christian community". He concludes that "Consequently, there is no mandate and no allowance in the New Testament for one adult believer to hold authority over another adult believer. Instead, the overall rule calls for mutual submission among all believers out of reverence for Christ".

The Christian egalitarian hermeneutic has received a highly systematic treatment from William J. Webb, professor of New Testament at Heritage Theological Seminary, Ontario, Canada. Webb argues that a major challenge is determining which biblical commands are "transcultural" and therefore applicable today, versus those which are "cultural" and therefore only applicable to the original (1st century) recipients of the text. His "redemptive movement" hermeneutic is justified using the example of slavery, which Webb sees as analogous to the subordination of women. Christians today largely perceive that slavery was "cultural" in biblical times and not something that should be re-introduced or justified, although slavery was (a) found in the Bible and (b) not explicitly banned there. Webb recommends that biblical commands be examined in light of the cultural context in which they were originally written. According to the "redemptive approach", slavery and women's subordination are found in the Bible; however, the same Scriptures also contain ideas and principles which, if developed and taken to their logical conclusion, would bring about the abolition of these institutions. According to that ideal, biblical patriarchy should be replaced by the "all one in Christ Jesus" proclamation of Galatians 3:28 which says "There is no Jew nor Greek, slave nor free, male nor female. For you are all one in Christ Jesus."

Some other New Testament instructions that are almost universally considered "cultural" and therefore only applicable to the original (1st century) recipients of the text are for women to wear veils when praying or prophesying, Christians to wash each other's feet (a direct command from Jesus in the Upper Room discourse), the instruction, appearing five times in the New Testament, to greet one another with a holy kiss—among others.

In contrast to egalitarian teaching, complementarians teach that male priority and headship (positional leadership) were instituted prior to the Fall and that the decree in Genesis 3:16 merely distorted this leadership by introducing "ungodly domination". Complementarians teach that the male leadership seen throughout the Old Testament (i.e., the patriarchs, priesthood and monarchy) was an expression of the creation ideal, as was Jesus' selection of 12 male apostles and New Testament restrictions on church leadership to men only.

Complementarians criticize Webb's hermeneutic. Grudem argues that Webb expects Christians to pursue a "superior ethic" to that found in the New Testament, therefore undermining the authority and sufficiency of Scripture. He claims that Webb and some other evangelicals misconstrue the biblical teaching about both slavery and women, and inappropriately confuse the two. He writes that slavery is tolerated in Scripture but never commanded but in some cases is criticized, whereas wives are explicitly commanded to submit to their husbands and male leadership is never criticized. Additionally, Grudem believes that Webb's "redemptive-movement" hermeneutic (itself a variation of the "trajectory" hermeneutic commonly employed by egalitarians) ultimately relies on subjective judgments that are incapable of producing certainty about ethical views.

=== Gender and the image of God ===
Complementarians traditionally hold that Christian ministers should be men. This is because of the need to represent Jesus Christ, who was the "Son" of God, and incarnated as a male human being. A related position is that while both male and female were made in the image of God, the woman shares in the divine image through the man. This is because she was created out of him, and is his "glory".

To us, a priest is primarily a representative, a double representative, who represents us to God and God to us... We have no objection to a woman doing the first: the whole difficulty is with the second. But why? [...] Suppose the reformer stops saying that a good woman may be like God and begins saying that God is like a good woman. Suppose he says that we might just as well pray to 'Our Mother which art in Heaven' as to 'Our Father'. Suppose he says that the Incarnation might just as well have taken a female as a male form, and the Second Person of the Trinity be as well called the Daughter as the Son. Suppose, finally, that the mystical marriage was reversed, that the churches were the Bridegroom and Christ the Bride. All this, as it seems to me, is involved in the claim that a woman can represent God as a priest does.

— C. S. Lewis, Priestesses in the Church? 1948

Christian egalitarians respond by arguing that God is not gendered and that males and females image God equally and without differences. In addition, terms such as "Father" and "Son", used in reference to God, should be understood as analogies or metaphors used by the biblical authors to communicate attributes about God in a culture where men had social privilege. Similarly, Christ became a male not because it was theologically necessary, but because 1st-century Jewish culture would not have accepted a female Messiah. Wayne Grudem takes exception to these egalitarian arguments, insisting that Christ's maleness was theologically necessary; he also alleges that egalitarians are increasingly advocating that God should be thought of as "Mother" as well as "Father", a move he sees as religiously liberal.

The Christian doctrine of the Trinity has become a major focus of contemporary gender debate, specifically in relation to 1 Corinthians 11:3. In 1977, George W. Knight III argued in a book about gender roles that the subordination of women to men is theologically analogous to the subordination of the Son to the Father in the Trinity. Australian theologian Kevin Giles has responded that complementarians have "reinvented" the doctrine of the Trinity to support their views of men and women, suggesting that some complementarians have adopted a heretical view of the Trinity similar to Arianism. A vigorous debate has ensued, with some egalitarians moving towards the idea that there is "mutual dependence" within the Trinity, including "subordination of the Father to the Son", which must be reflected in gender role relations. Grudem counters this by asserting that mutual submission to the Trinity cannot be supported by scripture and church history.

=== Relationship between ontology and roles ===
Modern complementarians argue that Genesis 1:26–28 and Galatians 3:28 establish the full equality of males and females in terms of status, worth and dignity. Complementary roles in marriage and church leadership, including the primary authority of men and the submission of wives, are not thought to contradict this principle of ontological equality. The equation of role or functional subordination and ontological inferiority is considered to be a category confusion. Egalitarian author Rebecca Merrill Groothuis has objected to this position. She argues that "woman's spiritual and ontological equality with man rules out the sort of subordination prescribed by gender traditionalists... It is not logically possible for woman to be essentially equal to man, yet universally subordinate to man on the basis of an essential attribute (i.e., femaleness)."

== Prominent women in the Old Testament ==
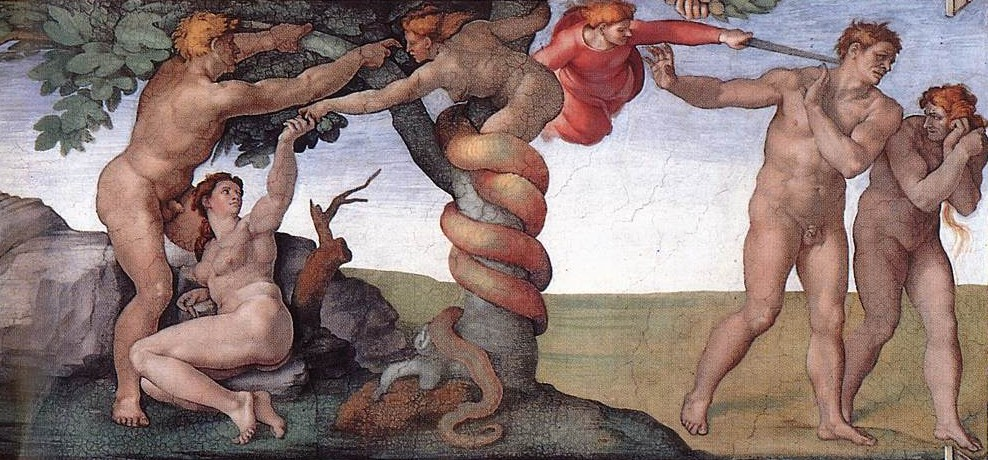
The Fall of Adam and Eve, depicted in the Sistine Chapel by Michelangelo

Christianity developed as a sect of Judaism in the first century AD. It therefore inherited the depictions of women already existing within the Hebrew Bible (known to Christians as The Old Testament).

In the Book of Genesis, the first creation story created man and woman at the same time, the second story of creation names Adam and Eve as the first man and the first woman; in the narrative, Adam was created first, and Eve from Adam's rib. Some commentators have suggested that Eve being God's second Creation indicated female inferiority, but in calling Eve "flesh of my flesh" others say a relationship of equality is implied.

Some women were praised in the Books of Ruth and Esther. The Book of Ruth is about a young Moabite woman's loyalty to her Jewish mother-in-law and her willingness to move to Israel and become a part of their culture. The story ends with her praise and blessing as she is married to an Israelite, who announces that he will now take care of her, and subsequently King David comes from her lineage. In the Book of Esther, a young woman named Esther of Jewish lineage is praised for her bravery as the queen of Persia who saved many from being killed by her pleas to the king.

== Women in the New Testament Church ==
The New Testament describes Jesus setting a values-standard regarding attitudes toward and treatment of women.

=== Jesus and women ===
In the canonical Gospels, Jesus is portrayed as engaging women publicly and privately, including women described as neglected or rejected within his society, and as receiving women as hearers of his teaching and as followers in his wider circle. Apart from the disciples' surprise at Jesus speaking with a woman in John 4:27, the Gospels rarely present his association with women as controversial. Criticism more often targets his wider table fellowship with "tax collectors and sinners" (Luke 7:34–39).

John Meier treats the presence of unaccompanied women participating in an itinerant preaching movement around a celibate male teacher as a pattern that does not align with typical Jewish social practice of the period. Ben Witherington argues that the Gospel portrayals present Jesus as acting in ways that challenged traditions that restricted women's participation in religious practice.

Luke in particular has an interest in Jesus' relationship with women and is the only Gospel to state that Jesus' ministry was supported financially by a number of women. This portrayal is commonly set against first-century social expectations in which women were often associated with domestic roles and were evaluated negatively by some pagan and Jewish writers urged women toward seclusion. (Note: Evans (2008, p. 196) points to Philo of Alexandria (Special Laws 3.169), stating that public spaces are suited to men, while women's proper duties are taking care of the house and remaining at home. Dictionary of Jesus and the Gospels (2013, p. 880) states that Josephus, the first-century Jewish historian, held that Jewish law regards women as inferior.)

Jesus affirmed traditional service expectations for men and women while presenting servanthood as the "greatest" vocation for all disciples (cf. Mark 9:33–37; 10:35–45). Women's participation in Jesus' mission can be compared with women’s involvement in ancient Jewish and Greco-Roman religious life. The Gospels offer a multidimensional portrayal in which many women remain unnamed without functioning merely as stock characters.

==== Women as followers and witnesses ====
The New Testament refers to a number of women in Jesus' circle, notably his mother Mary and Mary Magdalene, and the Gospels frequently depict women as followers and as key witnesses, especially in resurrection narratives. In the Gospel of John, Jesus' mother appears at the wedding at Cana (John 2:1–12) and at the crucifixion (John 19:25–27), where Jesus is depicted as making provision for her care.

The Gospel accounts present women as the first to report the resurrection, and that women's witness stands close to the origin of the Christian movement. Mary Magdalene is sometimes identified with other female figures in the Gospels (for example, the sinner of Luke 7:36–50 or Mary of Bethany), though the texts themselves do not make these identifications.

Biblical scholar Amy-Jill Levine notes that women are not named among the Twelve, and women are not depicted as present in some episodes that feature the Twelve as a group (for example, the calling of Peter, Andrew, James, and John, the Last Supper, and Gethsemane).

==== Teachings on status and service ====
Within the Synoptic narratives, Jesus teaches his disciples not to imitate status-seeking patterns of rule, but to embrace a pattern of service. These sayings address disciples generally, and are cited in later Christian discussions about authority and leadership, including debates about gender roles and church order. All three Synoptic Gospels record Jesus teaching his disciples not to imitate "lording it over" others, but to embrace a pattern of service:

You know that the rulers of the nations lord it over them, and their great ones exercise authority over them. It shall not be so among you, but whoever desires to become great among you shall be your servant. Whoever desires to be first among you shall be your bondservant, even as the Son of Man came not to be served, but to serve, and to give his life as a ransom for many. - Matthew 20:25–28

==== Selected Gospel episodes ====
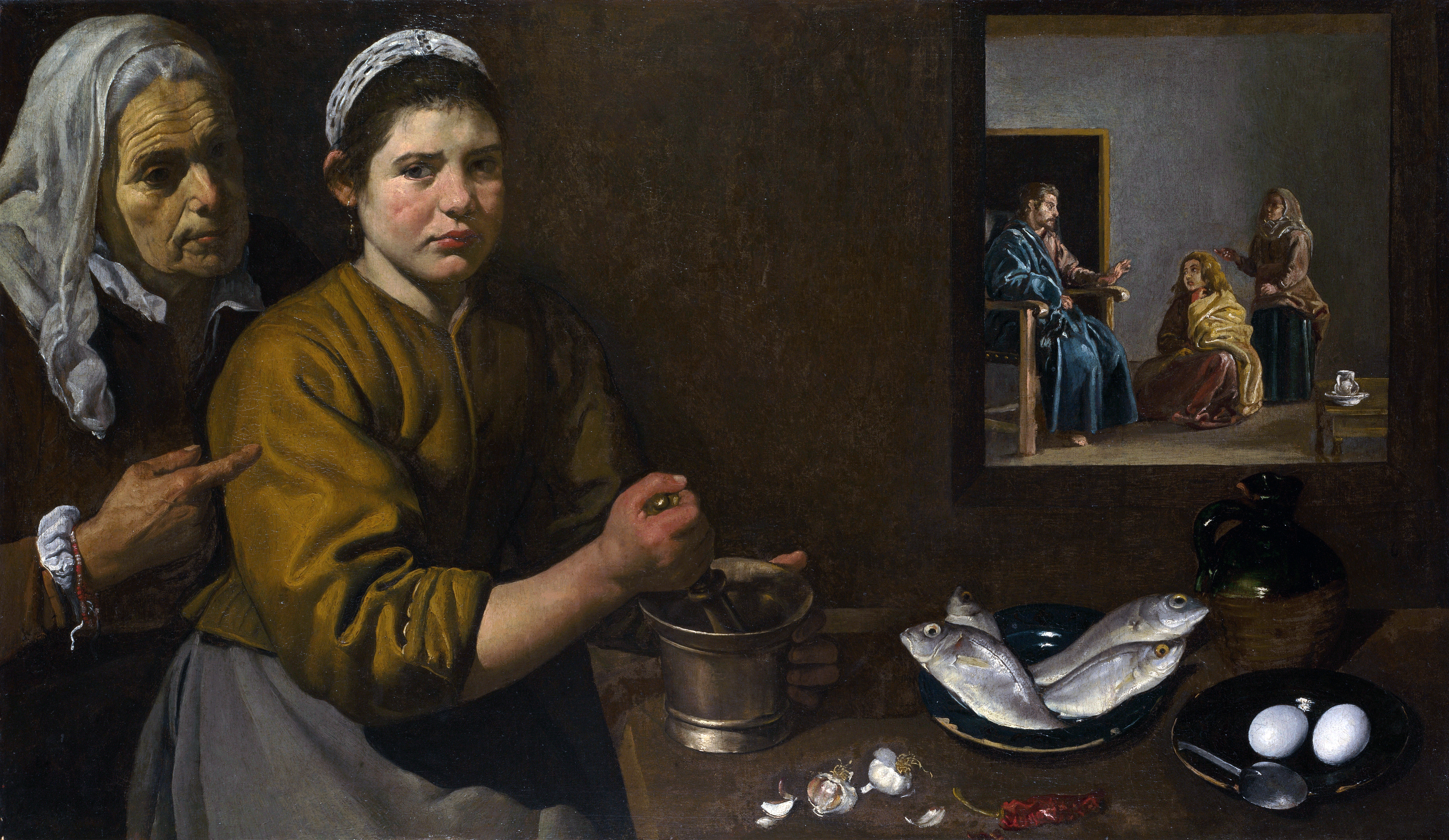
Christ in the House of Martha and Mary, Diego Velázquez, 1618

In the passion and resurrection narratives, Mary Magdalene is described as a prominent disciple, consistently listed first among named female disciples, and in some Gospel accounts as the first person to whom the risen Jesus appeared. Witherington argues that John shows a particular interest in portraying key women as models of awakening faith and as witnesses of the Christian community, and notes that the women's visit to Jesus' tomb is the only event narrated by all four Evangelists.

During one of Jesus' trips into Phoenician territory, a mother asks him to heal her demon-afflicted daughter. In Matthew he initially ignores her, and in both Matthew and Mark he responds that it is not right to take the children’s bread and throw it to the dogs, a metaphor that contrasts Israel with Gentiles, but the woman persists and replies that even the dogs eat the crumbs from the table, after which Jesus grants her request and heals the child (Mt 15:21–28; Mk 7:24–30).

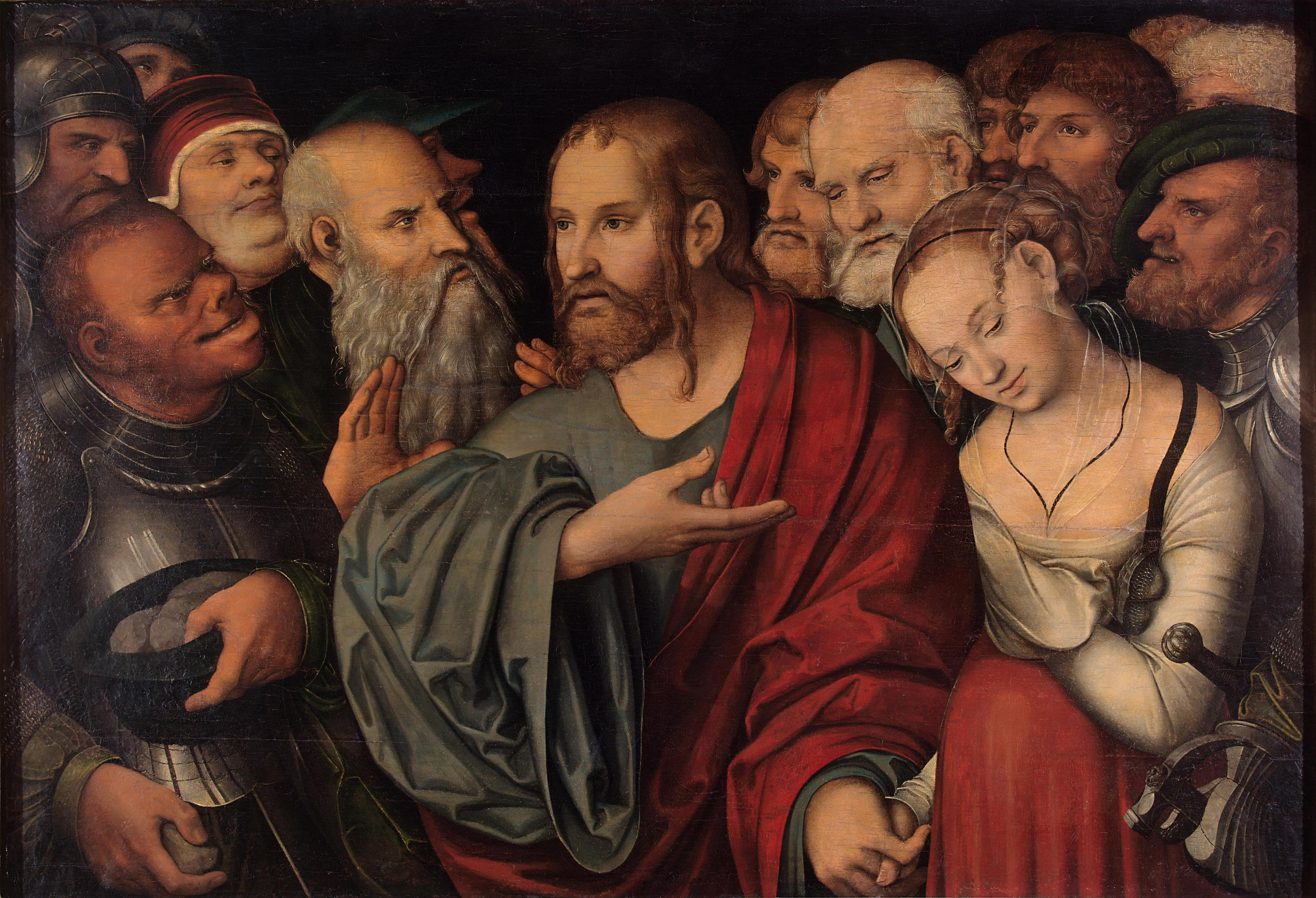
Christ and the Woman Taken in Adultery, Lucas Cranach, c. 1532

Luke also depicts Jesus at the house of Martha and Mary, with Mary sitting at Jesus' feet as he teaches and Jesus defending her choice when Martha objects. Grenz and Kjesbo argue that the narrative uses terminology associated with rabbinic study, suggesting that Mary is portrayed as a student. Moreover, the Gospel explicitly describes women as active supporters of Jesus' ministry, including women who travel with him and provide for the group out of their resources (Luke 8:1–3).

In the woman taken in adultery account (John 7:53–8:11), Jesus prevents a crowd from carrying out punishment against a woman accused of adultery, challenges the accusers ("He that is without sin among you, let him first cast a stone at her"), and then tells the woman to leave and not persist in sin. (Note: Many contemporary New Testament textual critics regard John 7:53–8:11 (the Pericope adulterae) as not part of the earliest recoverable text of the Gospel of John. Yan Ma notes that NTG28 and GNT5, along with many translators and commentators, often treat this as a scholarly consensus, though some textual critics continue to dispute it. Andrews compares John 7:53–8:11 with Luke 22:43–44, arguing that both are retained in the Novum Testamentum Graece / UBS text largely by tradition despite not being original, and that most Bible translations keep them with notes (he adds that the Revised Standard Version initially excluded John 7:53–8:11 but later restored it).)

=== Apostle Paul and women ===
The Pauline epistles are letters written to address specific questions or conflicts within the church community, they preserve only part of a larger exchange, and in such situations Paul may write sharply or diplomatically. Beyond instructions in his letters, Paul's greetings reveal Jewish and Gentile women active in early Christian communities, and his house churches included diverse members such as women and slaves.

==== Teachings ====
In Galatians 3:26–28, Paul writes: "There is neither Jew nor Greek, there is neither slave nor free man, there is neither male nor female; for you are all one in Christ Jesus." Schnelle and Witherington argue that faith and baptism into Christ remove the significance of ethnic, social, and sexual distinctions for rank and standing within the Christian community.

In 1 Corinthians 7 Paul commends celibacy as a gift, yet treats marriage as the proper outlet for those without that gift. Paul's wording grants husband and wife mutual authority over one another's bodies. This command treats men and women equally, allows sexual abstinence only when both partners agree, doesn't make having children the main point of marriage, and by forbidding divorce, protects Christian women by limiting men's power to abandon them.

In 1 Corinthians 11:2–16, Paul obligates a woman to wear a textile head covering in assembly when she prays or prophesies. (Note: An artificial textile covering is the majority reading in contemporary scholarship.: Payne, Philip B. (2015). Man and Woman, One in Christ: An Exegetical and Theological Study of Paul's Letters. Grand Rapids, MI: Zondervan Academic. "Most modern commentators have understood "with head uncovered" (άκατακαλύπτω τή κεφαλή) to refer to a woman not wearing a veil, shawl, or some other garment over her head (CEV) (p. 150)."; Wu, Rongxi (2020). The Veil in Classical Antiquity: A Sociocultural and Exegetical Study of 1 Corinthians 11:2-16. University of Sheffield. p. 19. "This study sides with the majority of commentators and takes the object of uncovering (1 Cor. 11:5) as the head-covering."; Hoelke, April Marie (2014). Exposed heads and exposed motives: Coverings as a means to unity at Corinth (MA thesis). Gardner–Webb University. "The majority of scholars simply contend, however, that the passage refers to head coverings." p. 6; Major Greek lexicons such as BAGD 1957 and BDAG 2000 confirm katakalyptō and related phrasing as a cloth head covering.) He appeals to scripture, custom, and reason, and concludes the covering is a shared church practice. Despite dress variation, veiling later became established, spreading more in the west than the east. Many interpret Paul as urging conformity to local customs, but debate whether if it applies only to wives or all women.

In 1 Corinthians 14:34-35, it states "let the wives be quiet in the assemblies, for it has not been permitted for them to be talking except in submission" According to Taylor and Witherington, Paul does not impose an absolute ban on women speaking, since 1 Cor 11:5 assumes women pray and prophesy, but restricts disruptive speech to preserve order, with "silence" meaning refraining from questioning in the assembly and asking at home.

In Colossians 3:18–4:1 and Ephesians 5:21–6:9, wives are told to be subject to husbands and the relationship is developed by analogy with Christ and the church. Witherington reads the household codes temper patriarchy by stressing the household head’s duties, reading Eph 5:21 as mutual submission while still calling husbands to self-giving headship.

Letters attributed to Paul, particularly 1 Timothy 3:15, frame the church itself as a "household," and include restrictions such as prohibitions on women teaching or exercising authority over men (1 Timothy 2:11–15), with women directed toward childbearing and household management.

==== Mentioned women ====
Paul names several women among this pastoral group, indicating that women often held significant roles in congregational life. This is because assemblies were sometimes closely tied to women's households, where the host or hostess could preside.

Romans 16 reflects the social stratification of Roman society through multiple house churches, and he highlights women's labor in these communities, noting that only women are described there as having "worked very hard." (Note: Sybrandi notes that the verb κοπιάω in Romans 16 is applied there only to women.)

Paul commends Phoebe to the Roman community as a diakonos of the church at Cenchreae and as a patron who aided many, including Paul. The word διάκονος in Romans 16:1 can denote a recognized ministerial role in a local church, and that προστάτις in Romans 16:2 implies benefaction or leadership rather than general assistance, with Campbell linking Phoebe as Paul's emissary within his social network.

He greets Priscilla, Junia, Julia, and Nereus' sister. He commends Mary, Tryphaena and Tryphosa, and Persis for their labor. In Philippians, Euodia and Syntyche are described as having labored alongside Paul in the gospel.

Priscilla appears seven times in the New Testament, (Note: Instances include: Acts 18:2–3; Acts 18:18; Acts 18:19; Acts 18:26; Romans 16:3–4; 1 Corinthians 16:19; 2 Timothy 4:19) named before her husband Aquila in five instances, a pattern suggesting her prominence in their partnership according to Paul Achtemeier, though no explicit hierarchy is stated. The couple supported Paul's missionary work and led a house church in Ephesus. As fellow Jews and Christians who shared Paul's tentmaking trade, they hosted him in Corinth, accompanied him to Ephesus, and maintained ongoing contact. Paul called them his "fellow workers in Christ Jesus" (Romans 16:3).

Paul greets Andronicus and Junia in Romans 16:7. Patristic evidence supports reading a woman named Junia, and Junias is unattested. Andronicus and Junia are likely Jewish Christians and a missionary couple, and if "prominent among the apostles" is correct, "apostle" here is used in a broader sense tied to itinerant evangelism and church planting.

== Women in church history ==
=== Apostolic age ===
From the very beginning of the early Christian church, women were important members of the movement, although some complain that much of the information in the New Testament on the work of women has been overlooked. Some also argue that many assumed that it had been a "man's church" because sources of information stemming from the New Testament church were written and interpreted by men. Recently, scholars have begun looking in mosaics, frescoes, and inscriptions of that period for information about women's roles in the early church. The historian Geoffrey Blainey wrote that the early Christian texts refer to various women activists in the early church. One such woman was St. Priscilla, a Jewish missionary from Rome, who may have helped found the Christian community at Corinth. She traveled as a missionary with her husband and St Paul, and tutored the Jewish intellectual Apollos. Others include the four daughters of Philip the Evangelist, from Caesarea, Palestine, who were said to be prophets and to have hosted St Paul in their home.

=== Patristic age ===
From the early patristic age, the offices of teacher and sacramental minister were reserved for men throughout most of the church in the East and West. Clement of Rome in chapter 55 of his First Epistle (AD 90) lists Judith and Esther as examples of manly feats and perfection. Tertullian, the 2nd-century Latin father, wrote that "It is not permitted to a woman to speak in church. Neither may she teach, baptize, offer, nor claim for herself any function proper to a man, least of all the sacerdotal office" ("On the Veiling of Virgins"). Origen (AD 185–254) stated that,

Even if it is granted to a woman to show the sign of prophecy, she is nevertheless not permitted to speak in an assembly. When Miriam the prophetess spoke, she was leading a choir of women ... For [as Paul declares] "I do not permit a woman to teach," and even less "to tell a man what to do."

In early centuries, the Eastern church allowed women to participate to a limited extent in ecclesiastical office by ordaining deaconesses.

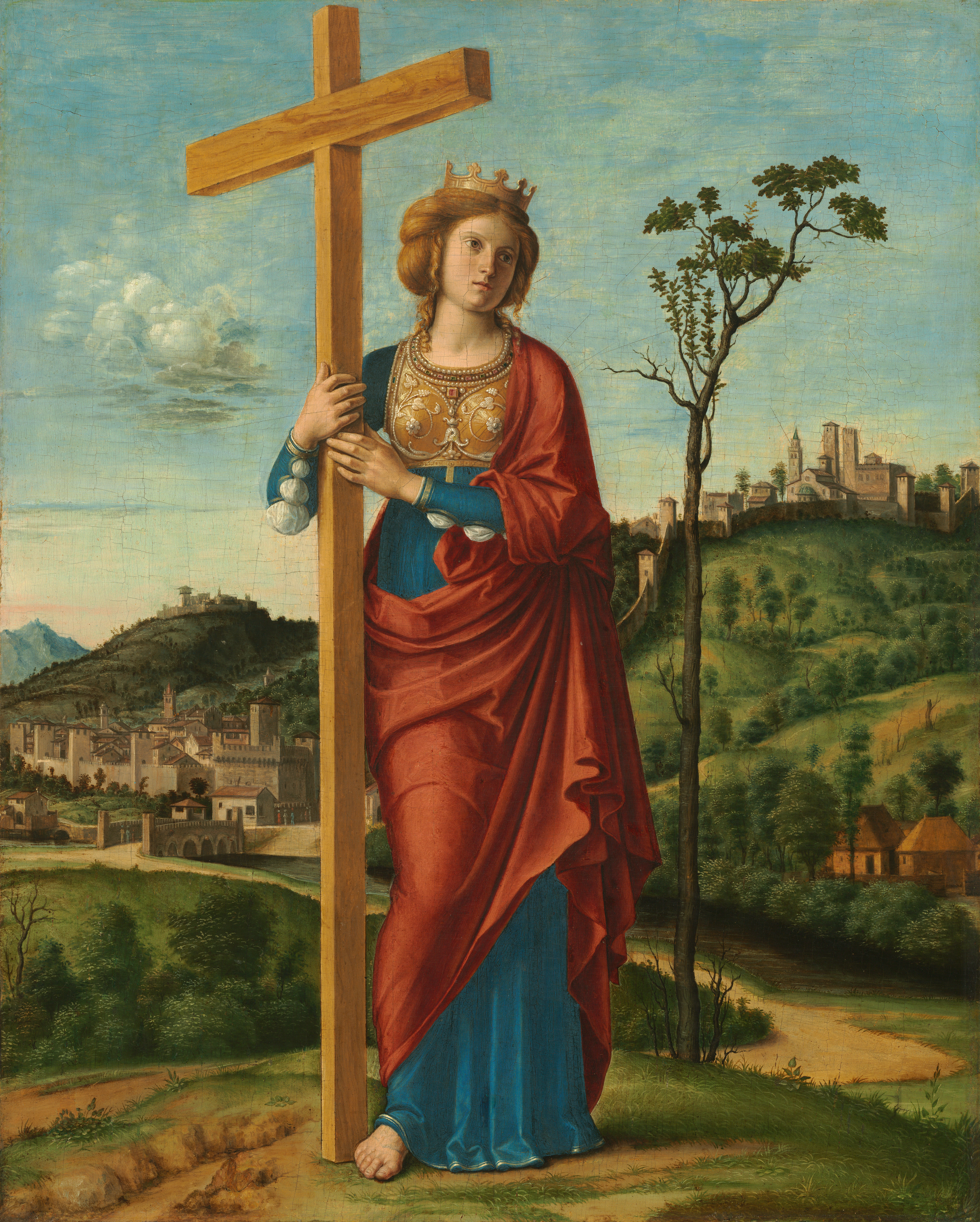
St. Helena, mother of the Emperor Constantine, whose conversion to Christianity changed the course of world history.

Women commemorated as saints from the early centuries of Christianity include several martyrs who suffered under the Persecution of Christians in the Roman Empire, such as Agnes of Rome, Saint Cecilia, Agatha of Sicily and Blandina. The passion of Saints Perpetua and Felicity, written by Perpetua during her imprisonment in 203, recounted their martyrdom. The passion is thought to be one of the earliest surviving documents to have been written by a woman in early Christianity. In late Antiquity, Saint Helena was a Christian and consort of Emperor Constantius, and the mother of Emperor Constantine I. Similarly, Saint Monica was a pious Christian and mother of Saint Augustine of Hippo. In the Catholic and Eastern Orthodox Church, the priesthood and the ministries dependent upon it such as Bishop, Patriarch and Pope, were restricted to men. The first Council of Orange (441) forbade the ordination of women to the diaconate. The performance of Saint Euphemia's miracle in The Council of Chalcedon (451) aided and confirmed the Christological view of Dyophysitism.

=== Middle ages ===
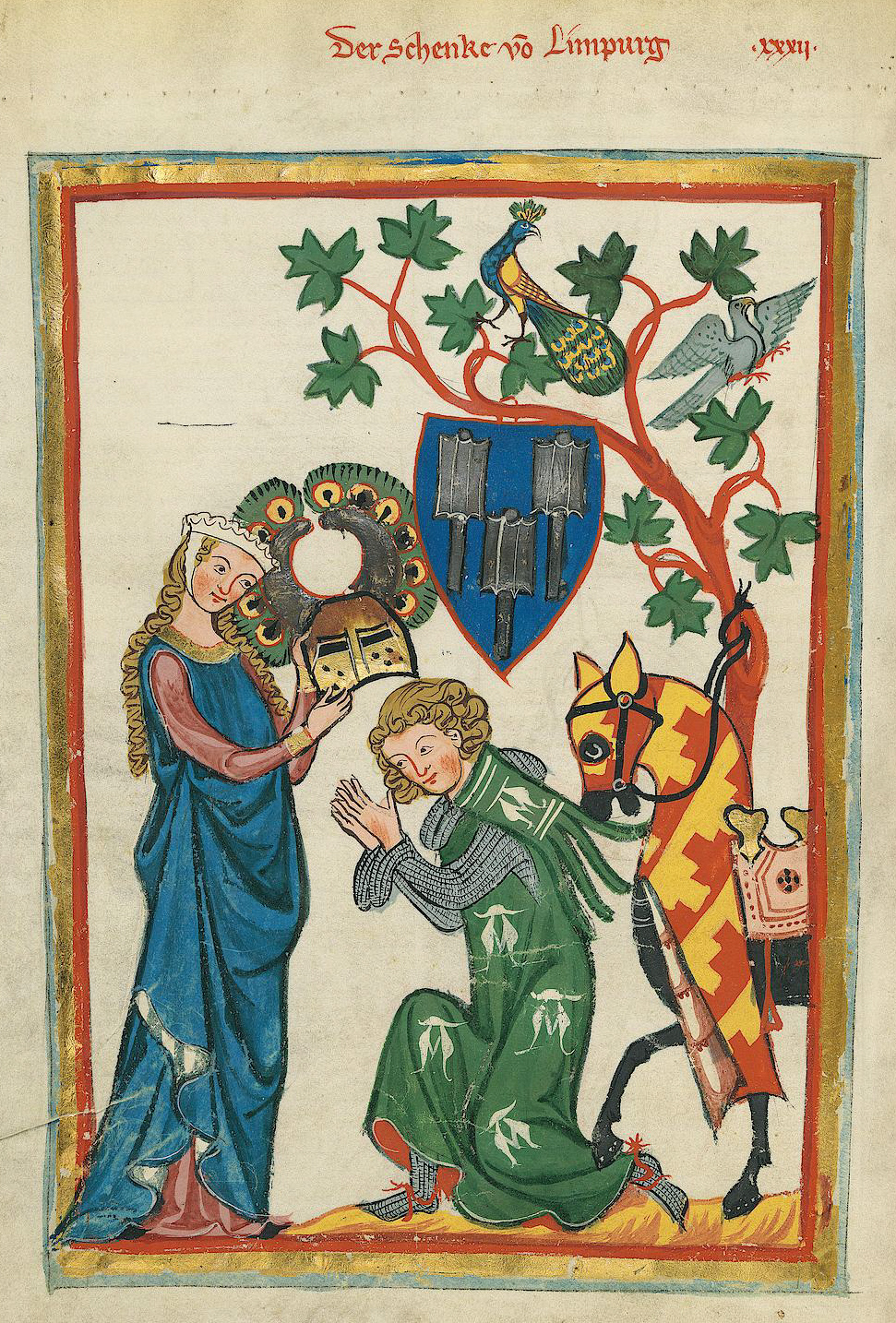
A knight being armed. Catholic Europe developed the refined warrior code of chivalry during the Middle Ages.

As Western Europe transitioned from the Classical to Medieval Age, the male hierarchy with the Pope at its summit became a central player in European politics. Mysticism flourished and monastic convents and communities of Catholic women became institutions within Europe.

With the establishment of Christian monasticism, other influential roles became available to women. From the 5th century onward, Christian convents provided opportunities for some women to escape the path of marriage and child-rearing, acquire literacy and learning, and play a more active religious role. In the later Middle Ages women such as Saint Catherine of Siena and Saint Teresa of Avila, played roles in the development of theological ideas and discussion within the church, and were later declared Doctors of the Roman Catholic Church. The Belgian nun, St Juliana of Liège (1193–1252), proposed the Feast of Corpus Christi, celebrating the body of Christ in the Eucharist, which became a major feast throughout the Church. In the Franciscan movement of the thirteenth century, religious women like St. Clare of Assisi played a significant part. Later, Joan of Arc took up a sword and achieved military victories for France, before being captured and tried as a "witch and heretic", after which she was burned at the stake. A papal inquiry later declared the trial illegal. A hero to the French, sympathy grew for Joan even in England. Pope Benedict XV canonized Joan in 1920.

The historian Geoffrey Blainey, writes that women were more prominent in the life of the Church during the Middle Ages than at any previous time in its history, with a number of church reforms initiated by women. In the 13th century, authors began to write of a mythical female pope—Pope Joan—who managed to disguise her gender until giving birth during a procession in Rome. Blainey cites the ever-growing veneration of the Virgin Mary and Mary Magdalene as evidence of a high standing for female Christians at that time. The Virgin Mary was conferred such titles as Mother of God and Queen of Heaven and, in 863, her feast day, the "Feast of Our Lady", was declared equal in importance to those of Easter and Christmas. Mary Magdalene's Feast Day was celebrated in earnest from the 8th century on and composite portraits of her were built up from Gospel references to other women Jesus met.

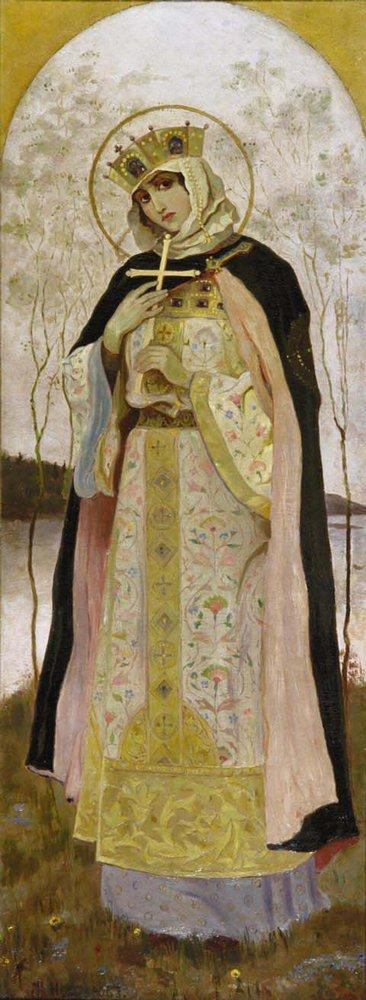
St Olga of Kyiv was the first Rus ruler to convert to Christianity.

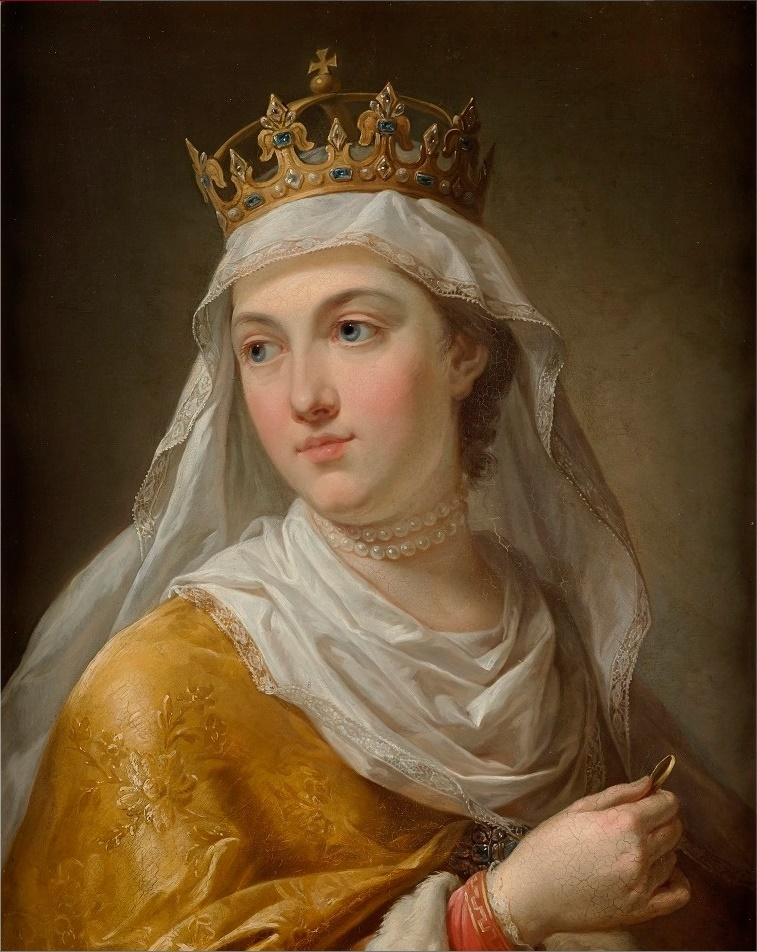
Saint Jadwiga of Poland is the patron saint of queens in the Catholic Church.

Other than the institution of the convent, monarchy was the major European institution allowing women an alternative to marriage and child rearing. Female monarchs of this period include: Olga of Kiev, who around AD 950, became the first Russian ruler to convert to Christianity; Italian noblewoman Matilda of Tuscany (1046–1115), remembered for her military accomplishments and for being the principal Italian supporter of Pope Gregory VII during the Investiture Controversy; Saint Hedwig of Silesia (1174–1243), who supported the poor and the church in Eastern Europe; and Jadwiga of Poland, who reigned as monarch of Poland and, within the Catholic Church, is honored as the patron saint of queens and of a "united Europe". Saint Elisabeth of Hungary (1207–1231) was a symbol of Christian charity who used her wealth to establish hospitals and care for the poor. Each of these women were singled out as model Christians by Pope John Paul II in his Mulieris Dignitatem letter on the dignity and vocation of women.

=== Post Reformation ===
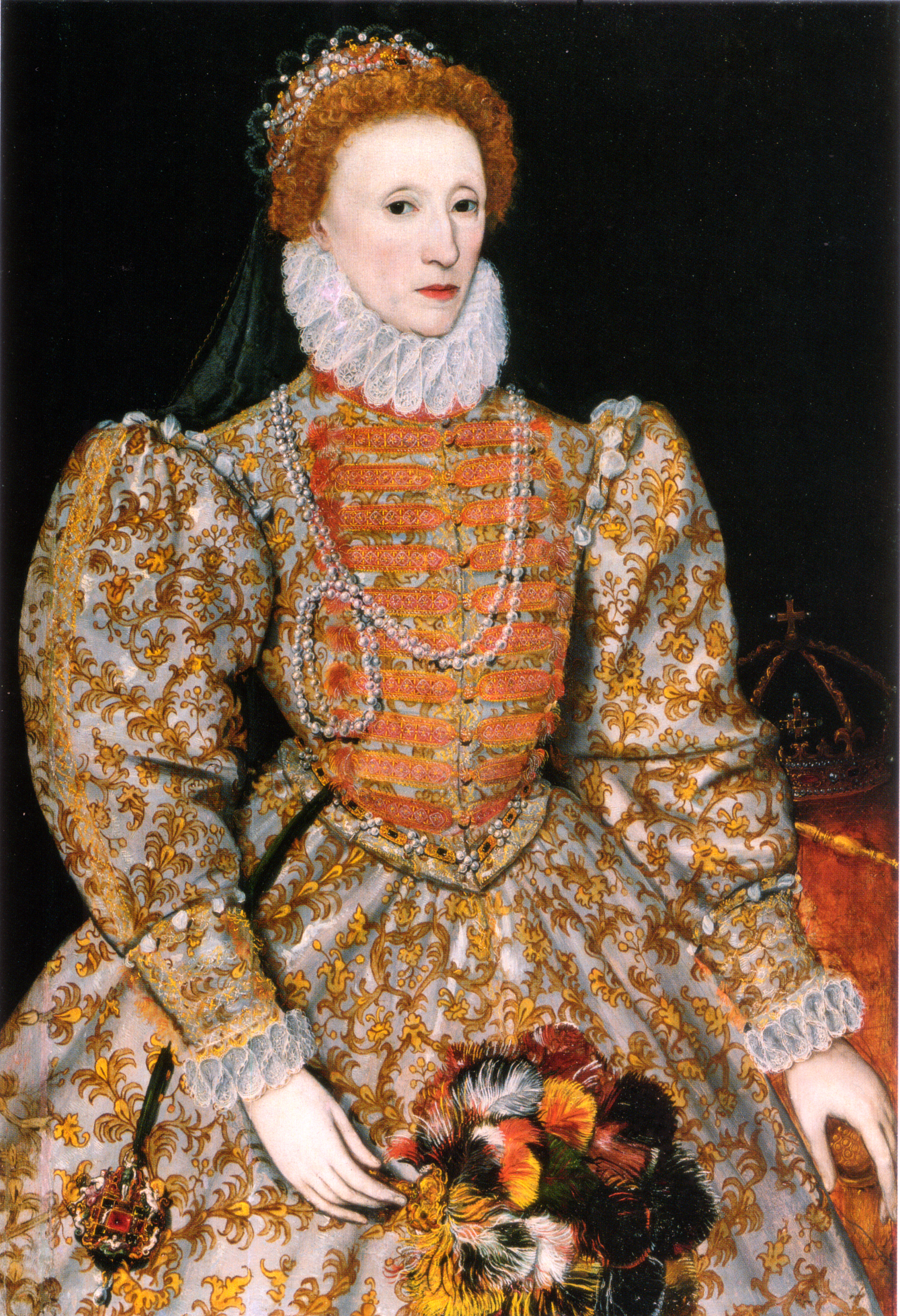
Queen Elizabeth I was a key figure in the consolidation of Protestant Christianity in England.

The Reformation swept through Europe during the 16th century. The excommunication of Protestants by leaders of the Roman Catholic Church ended centuries of unity among Western Christendom. The religion of an heir to the throne became an intensely important political issue. The refusal of Pope Clement VII to grant an annulment in the marriage of King Henry VIII to Catherine of Aragon saw Henry establish himself as supreme governor of the church in England. His female Protestant successors have served as Supreme Governor of the Church of England. Rivalry between Catholic and Protestant heirs ensued. Protestantism was consolidated in England by Henry's daughter, Elizabeth I, who influenced the development of Anglicanism through cultivation of an Elizabethan religious settlement with the publication of the Book of Common Prayer. The religion of an heir or monarch's spouse complicated intermarriage between royal houses through coming centuries. Consorts of the Holy Roman Emperors were given the title of Holy Roman Empress. The throne was reserved for males, thus there was never a Holy Roman Empress regnant, though women such as Theophanu and Maria Theresa of Austria, controlled the power of rule and served as de facto Empresses regnant. A liberal-minded autocrat, she was a patron of sciences and education and sought to alleviate the suffering of the serfs. She kept Catholic observance at court and frowned on Judaism and Protestantism. She reigned for 40 years, and mothered 16 children including Marie-Antoinette, the ill-fated Queen of France. With her husband she founded the Catholic Habsburg-Lorraine Dynasty who remained central players in European politics into the 20th century.

One effect of the Reformation in the Reformed areas was to bring an end to the long tradition of female convents which had existed within Roman Catholicism, and which the Reformers saw as bondage. By shutting down female convents within the movement, Protestantism effectively closed off the option of a full-time religious role for Protestant women, as well as one which had provided some women a life in academic study.

However, some convents (such as Ebstorf Abbey near the town of Uelzen and Bursfelde Abbey in Bursfelde) adopted the Lutheran faith. Many of these convents in eastern Europe were closed by communist authorities after the Second World War. They are sometimes called damenstift. One notable damenstift member was Catharina von Schlegel (1697–1777) who wrote the hymn that was translated into English as "Be still, my soul, the Lord is on thy side".

However, other convents voluntarily folded during the Reformation. For example, following Catherine of Mecklenburg's choice to defy her Catholic husband and smuggle Lutheran books to Ursula of Munsterberg and other nuns, Ursula (in 1528) published 69 articles justifying their reasons to leave their convent. Martin Luther himself taught that "the wife should stay at home and look after the affairs of the household as one who has been deprived of the ability of administering those affairs that are outside and concern the state...." Among the many nuns who chose the domestic life over the monastic life was the wife of Martin Luther, Katherine von Bora.

In 1569 Lutheran Magdalena Heymair became the first woman ever to have her writings listed on the Index Librorum Prohibitorum. She published a series of pedagogical writings for elementary-age teaching and also wrote poetry. Calvinist Anne Locke was a translator and poet who published the first English sonnet sequence. In 1590, Christine of Hesse published the Lutheran psalm-book Geistliche Psalmen und Lieder.

John Calvin noted that "the woman's place is in the home." The majority of Protestant churches upheld the traditional position, and restricted ruling and preaching roles within the Church to men until the 20th century, although there were early exceptions among some groups such as the Quakers and within some Pentecostal holiness movements.

John Knox (1514–1572) also denied women the right to rule in the civic sphere, as he asserted in his famous First Blast of the Trumpet Against the Monstrous Regimen of Women. Baptist theologian Dr. John Gill (1690–1771) comments on 1 Corinthians 14:34–35, stating

(Genesis 3:16) "thy desire shall be to thy husband, and he shall rule over thee." By this, the apostle signified that the reason women were not to speak in the church, or to preach and teach publicly, or be concerned in the ministerial function was that in the Roman Empire, those were considered to be acts of power and authority, of rule and government, and thus contrary to that subjection which God in his law requires of women unto men. The extraordinary instances of Deborah, Huldah, and Anna, must not be drawn into a rule or example in such cases.

Methodist founder John Wesley (1703–1791) and Methodist theologian Adam Clarke (1762–1832) both upheld male headship, but allowed that spiritual Christian women could publicly speak in church meetings if they "are under an extraordinary impulse of the Spirit" (Wesley), and that such were to obey that influence, and that "the apostle lays down directions in chap. 11 for regulating her personal appearance when thus employed." (Clarke) Puritan theologian Matthew Poole (1624–1679) concurred with Wesley, adding,

But setting aside that extraordinary case of a special afflatus, [strong Divine influence] it was, doubtless, unlawful for a woman to speak in the church.

Matthew Henry (1662–1714) in his commentary, entertains allowing "praying, and uttering hymns inspired" by women, as such "were not teaching". Within the Church of England, King Henry VIII's dissolution of the religious houses swept away the convents which had been a feature of Christianity in England for centuries. Anglican religious orders and Sisterhoods were later re-established within the Anglican tradition however.

In Europe, Portugal and Spain remained Catholic and were on the cusp of building global empires. As sponsor of Christopher Columbus' 1492 mission to cross the Atlantic, the Spanish Queen Isabella I (Isabella the Catholic) of Castille was an important figure in the growth of Catholicism as a global religion, for Spain and Portugal followed Columbus' route to establish vast Empires in the Americas. Her marriage to Ferdinand II of Aragon had ensured the unity of the Spanish Kingdom and the royal couple agreed to hold equal authority. Spanish Pope Alexander VI conferred on them the title "Catholic". The Catholic Encyclopedia credits Isabella as an extremely able ruler and one who "fostered learning not only in the universities and among the nobles, but also among women". Of Isabella and Ferdinand, it says: "The good government of the Catholic sovereigns brought the prosperity of Spain to its apogee, and inaugurated that country's Golden Age". In seventeenth-century Massachusetts, Anne Hutchison, a successful preacher and teacher was exiled because she usurped male authority.

Many women were martyred during the Counter-Reformation, including the Guernsey Martyrs, three women martyred for Protestantism in 1556. One woman was pregnant and gave birth while being burned, the child was rescued but then ordered to be burned as well. Still other women, such as those living in the Defereggen Valley, were stripped of their children so they could be raised in Catholic in an institution.

=== Modern times ===
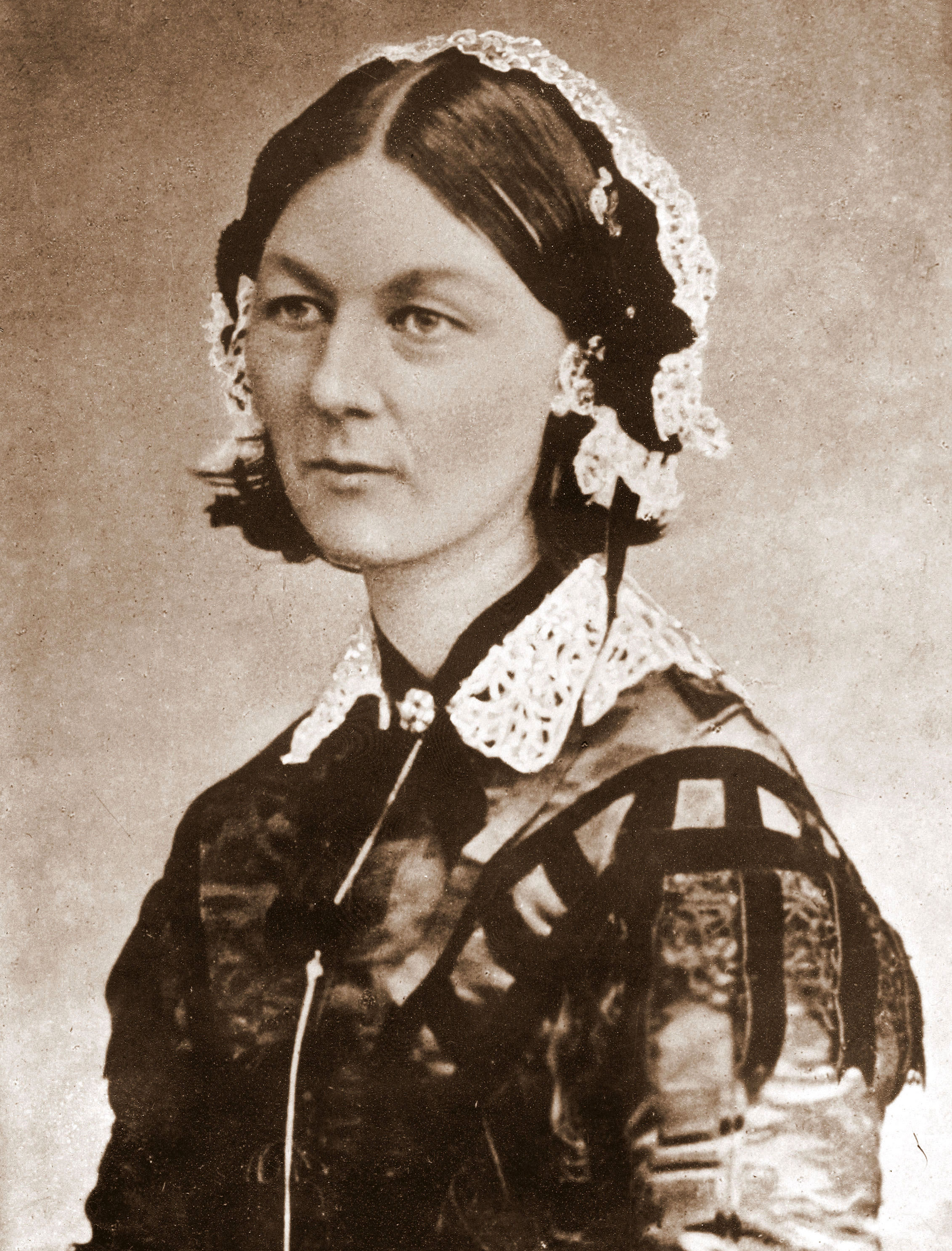
Anglican and nurse, Florence Nightingale. Christian women played a role in the development and running of the modern world's education and health care systems.

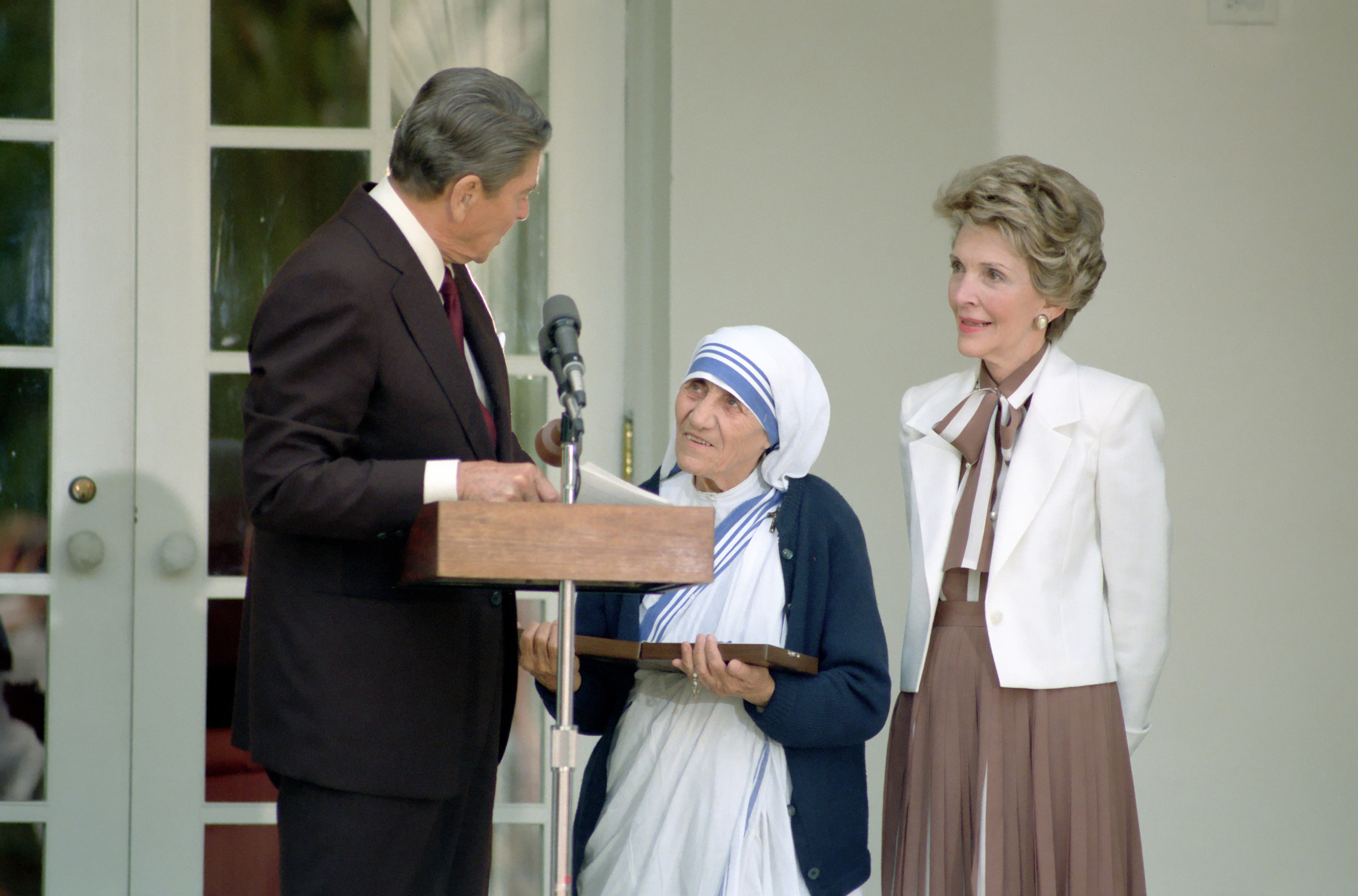
President Ronald Reagan of the United States presents Mother Teresa with the Presidential Medal of Freedom at a White House ceremony, 1985

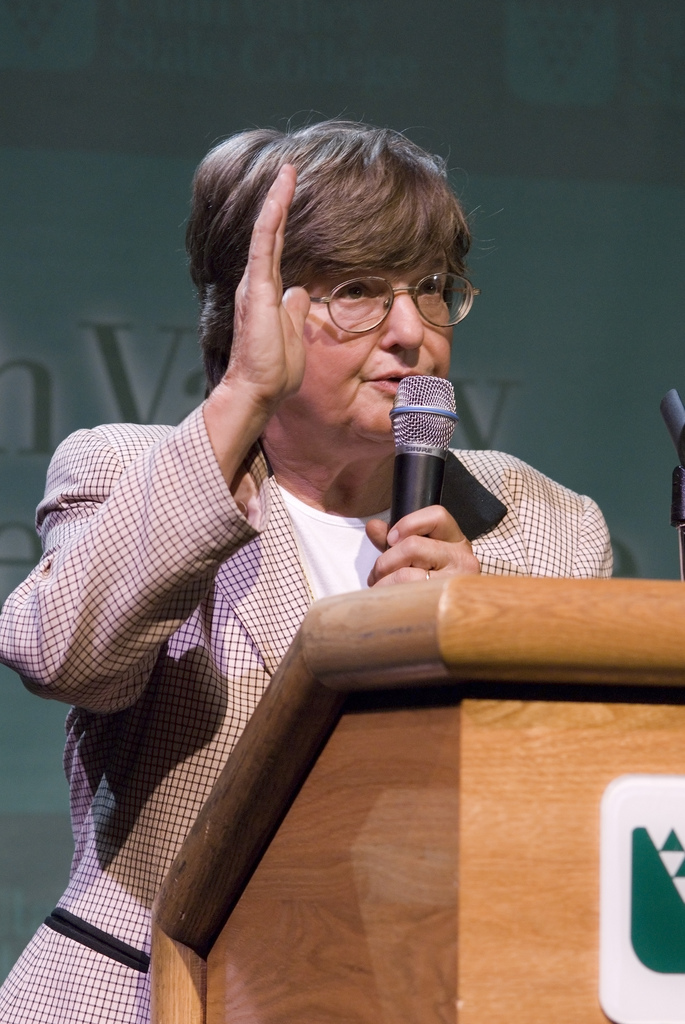
Anti-Death Penalty crusader Sister Helen Prejean in 2006

Amidst the backdrop of Industrial Revolution and expanding European Empires during the 17th–19th centuries, Christian women played a role in developing and running of many the modern world's education and health care systems. However, women "still had to work under the nominal control of a man" for missionary work as late as the end of the 19th century. Outside of these positions, "women were denied other influential public roles in the churches". The roles that women began taking began expanding. Catholic religious orders like the Sisters of Mercy the Little Sisters of the Poor Sisters of St. Joseph of the Sacred Heart were founded around the world and established extensive networks of hospitals and schools. The Anglican Florence Nightingale was influential in the development of modern nursing. While most Christian denominations did not allow women to preach during the nineteenth century, a few more evangelical Protestant denominations did permit women's preaching. In early-nineteenth-century Britain, the Bible Christians and Primitive Methodists permitted female preaching, and had a significant number of female preachers, particularly among the rural and working-class populations. Some of them emigrated to British colonies, and preached to settlers in colonies including early Canada. By the second half of the nineteenth century these denominations became more institutionalized, and thus less open to women's preaching, although a few women continued to preach in these denominations until the early twentieth century. Later in nineteenth-century Britain the Salvation Army was formed, and from the beginning it permitted women to preach on the same terms as men. These "Hallelujah Lasses", many of whom were working class, were very popular, often drawing huge crowds in Britain as well as in North America. Nonetheless, these denominations remained a minority, and in most Christian churches women remained barred from the ministry into the twentieth century.

For much of the early twentieth century, Catholic women continued to join religious orders in large numbers, where their influence and control was particularly strong in the running of primary education for children, high schooling for girls, and in nursing, hospitals, orphanages and aged care facilities. In the latter half of the 20th century, vocations for women in the West entered a steep decline. In spite of that, the Catholic Church conducted a large number of beatifications and canonizations of Catholic women from all over the world: St. Josephine Bakhita was a Sudanese slave girl who became a Canossian nun; St. Katharine Drexel (1858–1955) worked for Native and African Americans; Polish mystic St. Maria Faustina Kowalska (1905–1938) wrote her influential spiritual diary; and German nun Edith Stein was murdered by the Nazis at Auschwitz. Three Catholic women were declared Doctors of the Church, indicating a re-appraisal of the role of women within the life of that Church: the 16th-century Spanish mystic, St. Teresa of Ávila; the 14th-century Italian mystic St. Catherine of Siena and the 19th-century French nun St. Thérèse de Lisieux (called Doctor Amoris or Doctor of Love). The 19th century saw women begin to push back on traditional female roles in the church. One was Elizabeth Cady Stanton (1815–1902) who worked to "liberate women from their traditional shackles":

[O]ne of her first projects was a Woman's Bible in which the passages used by men to keep women in subjection were highlighted and critiqued. Although some early campaigners for female emancipation belonged to the churches, and though some church-related movements helped nurture women's entrance onto the public stage, the campaigners who embraced the feminist cause most wholeheartedly nearly always made a break from Church and Biblical Christianity.

While Catholicism and Orthodoxy adhered to traditional gender restrictions on ordination to the priesthood, ordination of women in Protestant churches has in recent decades become increasingly common. The Salvation Army elected Evangeline Booth as its first female General (worldwide leader) in 1934. New Zealander Penny Jamieson became the first woman in the world to be ordained a bishop of the Anglican Church in 1990 (although the queens of England have for centuries inherited the position of the Supreme Governor of the Church of England upon their ascensions to the throne).

In the developing world, people continued to convert to Christianity in large numbers. Among the most famous and influential women missionaries of the period was the Catholic nun Mother Teresa of Calcutta, who was awarded the Nobel Peace Prize in 1979 for her work in "bringing help to suffering humanity". Much admired by Pope John Paul II, she was beatified in 2003, just six years after her death. Many Christian women and religious have been prominent advocates in social policy debates—as with American nun Helen Prejean, a Sister of Saint Joseph of Medaille, who is a prominent campaigner against the death penalty and was the inspiration for the Hollywood film Dead Man Walking.

== Modern views ==
Linda Woodhead states that, "Of the many threats that Christianity has to face in modern times, gender equality is one of the most serious". Some 19th-century Christian authors began codifying challenges to traditional views toward women both in the church and in society. Only since the 1970s have more diverse views become formalized. In addition to non-Christian perspectives, four of the primary views inside Christianity on the role of women are Christian feminism, Christian egalitarianism, complementarianism, and Biblical patriarchy.

=== Secular criticism ===
Representing an atheist perspective, author Joshua Kelly argues that the Christian Bible, in this view a creation of ancient authors and medieval editors reflecting their own culture and opinions and not the declarations of a supernatural being, describes and advocates for sexist norms, which should be rejected by modern people. Kelly points to the requirement for women to subordinate themselves to their husbands espoused in the New Testament book of Ephesians, the classification of women as property along with oxen and slaves throughout the Torah, and the permission given by the Book of Exodus for a man to sell his daughter as a maidservant.

=== Christian feminism ===
Christian feminists take an actively feminist position from a Christian perspective. Recent generations have experienced the rise of what has been labeled by some as "Christian feminism"—a movement that has had a profound impact on all of life, challenging some traditional basic Christian interpretations of Scripture with respect to roles for women. Scholars such as Karen Jo Torjesen have examined women's leadership in early Christian communities and the institutional developments that restricted those roles over time, notably in When Women Were Priests. However, Christian feminism represents the views of the more theologically liberal end of the spectrum within Christianity. In contrast to the more socially conservative Christian egalitarians, Christian feminists tend to support LGBT rights and a pro-choice stance on abortion. The Evangelical and Ecumenical Women's Caucus, a major international Christian feminist organization, values "inclusive images and language for God".

The book Genesis of Gender by Abigail Favale published in 2022 discusses her view on modern Christian feminism. She taught Gender Studies at a university before converting to Catholicism and elaborates on her interpretation of Genesis in the second chapter. She states, "Moreover, Genesis recognizes the duality of humankind, male and female; this difference is part of the goodness of creation, and both sexes share fully in the divine image and the commission to tend the earth. There is no sense here of hierarchy between male and female, but rather a shared, benevolent governance over the rest of creation" (Favale). This is a common view among Christian feminists, that both biological sexes are equal as both are created in the image of God. Similarly, Our Lives Matter by Pamela R. Lightsey describes Womanist Queer Theology, and incorporates modern events and renowned feminist theorists including Judith Butler into her argument for womanism in Christianity. As a Reverend in the United Methodist Church, Lightsey uses many verses of scripture to support her theology. She also ponders Genesis, stating, "God shaped and breathed life into humanity and did not desire to leave us alone. Having prohibited Adam and Eve from eating from the one tree of the knowledge of good and evil, God entrusted them with all that was created and charged them to care for every living creature" (Lightsey). These two prominent Christian authors of works concerning gender and feminism portray common analyses of biblical interpretation that support feminist ideals.

=== Egalitarian view ===
Christian Egalitarians' interpretation of Scripture brings them to the conclusion that the manner and teachings of Jesus, affirmed by the Apostle Paul, abolished gender-specific roles in both the church and in marriage.

Official statement

Men, Women and Biblical Equality was prepared in 1989 by several evangelical leaders to become the official statement of Christians for Biblical Equality (CBE). The statement lays out their biblical rationale for equality as well as its application in the community of believers and in the family. They advocate ability-based, rather than gender-based, ministry of Christians of all ages, ethnicities and socio-economic classes. Egalitarians support the ordination of women and equal roles in marriage, and are more conservative both theologically and morally than Christian feminists.

Christian egalitarian beliefs

- Both women and men were created equal by God
- Neither man nor woman was cursed by God at The Fall of Man—"So the Lord God said to the serpent, 'Because you have done this, cursed are you above all livestock and all wild animals! You will crawl on your belly and you will eat dust all the days of your life.' The human couple were warned by God in a prophetic sense what would be the natural consequences of sin having entered the human race. The natural consequences of sin mentioned by God in the Creation account included increased pains in childbearing, and the husband will rule over you.
- Jesus' radical "new Covenant" view was correctly articulated by the Apostle Paul when he wrote that "...there is no male nor female, for you are all one in Christ."

A scripture passage they consider key to the advocacy of full equality of responsibility and authority for both women and men is contained in a Pauline polemic containing these three antitheses:

There is neither Jew nor Greek, slave nor free, male nor female, for you are all one in Christ Jesus.

— Galatians 3:28

Christian Egalitarians interpret this passage as expressing that the overarching teaching of the New Testament is that all are "one in Christ". The three distinctions, important in Jewish life, are declared by Paul to be invalid in Christ. Therefore, among those "in Christ" there must be no discrimination based on race or national origin, social level, or gender. They respect the natural biological uniqueness of each gender, not seeing it as requiring any dominant/submissive applications of gender to either marriage or church leadership. David Scholer, New Testament scholar at Fuller Theological Seminary, affirms this view. He believes that Galatians 3:28 is "the fundamental Pauline theological basis for the inclusion of women and men as equal and mutual partners in all of the ministries of the church." Galatians 3:28 represents "the summation of Paul's theological vision," according to Pamela Eisenbaum, professor at Iliff School of Theology, who is one of four Jewish New Testament scholars teaching in Christian theological schools. Christian Egalitarianism holds that the submission of the woman in marriage and womanly restrictions in Christian ministry are inconsistent with the true picture of biblical equality. The equal-yet-different doctrine taught by Complementarians is considered by them to be a contradiction in terms.

Linda Woodhead claims that the modern

"egalitarian emphasis is contradicted by a symbolic framework that elevates the male over the female, and by organizational arrangements that make masculine domination a reality in church life. Theological statements on the position of women from down the centuries testify not only to the assumption that it is men who have the authority to define women, but to the precautions that have been taken to ensure that women do not claim too much real equality with men – in this life at least".

In their book Woman in the World of Jesus, Evelyn Stagg and Frank Stagg point out that in the Bible the only God-ordained restrictions on the genders is that "only the male can beget, and only the female can bear".

Gilbert Bilezikian, in his book Beyond Sex Roles—What the Bible Says About a Woman's Place in Church and Family, argues that the New Testament contains evidence of women apostles, prophets, teachers, deacons, and administrators.

Baptist theologian Roger Nicole, considered an expert in Calvinism, is a Christian Egalitarian and a Biblical Inerrantist. He recognizes that biblical egalitarianism is still viewed by many as inconsistent with biblical inerrancy, although he disagrees. He writes that "the matter of the place of women in the home, in society, and in the church is not an issue that can be conclusively determined by a few apparently restrictive passages that are often advanced by those who think that subordination represents God's will for women."

I believe that most, if not all, of the restrictions on women in society have no basis in Scripture, and that those maintained in the Church are based on an inadequate interpretation of a few restrictive passages, which put them in contradiction with the manifest special concern and love of God for women articulated from Genesis to Revelation.

— Roger Nicole, 2006

A limited notion of gender complementarity is held and is known as "complementarity without hierarchy".

David Basinger, a doctor of philosophy, says that Egalitarians point out, "Few Christians [...] take all biblical mandates literally." Basinger goes on to cite John 13:14 and James 5:14 as commandments prescribed by the Bible which are seldom followed by Christians. Basinger says that this logic indicates that traditional views "cannot be argued [...] solely because Paul and Peter exhorted the woman of their day to submit in the home and be silent in the church".

=== Complementarian view ===
Complementarians believe that God made men and women to be equal in personhood and value but different in roles. They understand the Bible as teaching that God created men and women to serve different roles in the church and the home. In the 1991 book Recovering Biblical Manhood and Womanhood, leading Complementarian theologians outlined what they consider to be biblically sanctioned definitions of masculinity and femininity:

At the heart of mature masculinity is a sense of benevolent responsibility to lead, provide for and protect women in ways appropriate to a man's differing relationships. At the heart of mature femininity is a freeing disposition to affirm, receive and nurture strength and leadership from worthy men in ways appropriate to a woman's differing relationships.

==== Official statement ====
The Danvers Statement on Biblical Manhood and Womanhood was prepared by several evangelical leaders at a Council on Biblical Manhood and Womanhood (CBMW) meeting in Danvers, Massachusetts, in December 1987. The statement lays out their biblical rationale for male priority and female submission in the community of believers and in the family. Additionally it cites a set of concerns shared by complementarians over other contemporary philosophies about gender:

- A growing threat to Biblical authority
- Ambivalence about motherhood and homemaking
- Claims of legitimacy for illicit sexual relationships and pornography
- Cultural uncertainty and confusion over complementary differences between masculinity and femininity
- Emergence of roles for men and women in church leadership seen as nonconforming to Biblical teaching
- Increasing attention given what they termed to be feminist egalitarianism
- Nontraditional reinterpretation of apparently plain meanings of Biblical texts
- Unraveling marriages
- Upsurge of physical and emotional abuse in the family

They attribute these ills to the "apparent accommodation of some within the church to the spirit of the age at the expense of winsome, radical Biblical authenticity which [...] may reform rather than reflect our ailing culture."

==== Interpretation of Scripture ====
Complementarians tend to be biblical inerrantists who take a more literal view of biblical interpretation. They disagree with Christian Egalitarians on theological positions related to gender, such as in holding that:

- Man was created with "headship" over the woman by being created first.
- Female exclusion from leadership over men is also justified due to her deception by the devil, which resulted in The Fall, for which Adam is also, or primarily, culpable.
- Both Old and New Testaments set a pattern of male leadership; for instance the priestly and kingly offices of the Old Testament were restricted to males; the Apostles of Jesus were all male; and Paul's instructions regarding church eldership in the epistles 1 Timothy and Titus appear to restrict this position to men.

Primary texts in the New Testament which they believe support male headship include these:

But I would have you know, that the head of every man is Christ; and the head of the woman is the man; and the head of Christ is God.

But I permit not a woman to teach, nor to have dominion over a man, but to be in quietness.

Wives, submit yourselves to your own husbands as you do to the Lord. For the husband is the head of the wife as Christ is the head of the church, his body, of which he is the Savior. Now as the church submits to Christ, so also wives should submit to their husbands in everything.

=== Biblical patriarchy view ===
Biblical patriarchy as expressed by the Vision Forum is similar to Complementarianism in that it affirms the equality of men and women, but goes further in its expression of the different gender roles. Many of the differences between them are ones of degree and emphasis. While Complementarianism holds to exclusively male leadership in the church and in the home, biblical patriarchy extends that exclusion to the civic sphere as well, so that women should not be civil leaders and indeed should not have careers outside the home. Thus, William Einwechter refers to the traditional Complementarian view as "two point complementarianism" (male leadership in the family and church), and regards the biblical patriarchy view as "three-point" or "full" complementarianism, (male leadership in family, church and society). In contrast to this, John Piper and Wayne Grudem, representing the Complementarian position, say that they are "not as sure in this wider sphere which roles can be carried out by men or women". Grudem also acknowledges exceptions to the submission of wives to husbands where moral issues are involved.

== Terminology ==
Although much of the contemporary literature settles on the terms Complementarianism and Christian Egalitarianism, a number of other more pejorative terms are frequently encountered.

- In Complementarian literature, the term "Christian feminism" is sometimes incorrectly used synonymously with "egalitarianism". For examples, see books by Wayne Grudem on the topic. Christian Egalitarians generally object to being labeled "feminist" or "evangelical feminist". Their belief in biblical equality is said to be grounded in the biblical teaching that all believers have been given authority in Christ. Conversely, feminist ideology is derived from cultural factors and philosophies. Christian Egalitarian author Rebecca Groothuis writes, "Like most cultural systems of thought, feminist ideology is partly true and partly false—almost entirely false at this point in history."
- In Christian Egalitarian literature, the terms "gender traditionalist", "patriarchalist" and "hierarchicalist" are sometimes used with reference to Complementarians. The use of these terms in egalitarian literature is defended in Rebecca Merrill Groothuis and Ronald W. Pierce, Discovering Biblical Equality: Complementarity without Hierarchy, IVP 2004, p. 17. "... it is probably most fitting to refer to those who believe in restricting leadership to men as simply advocates of male leadership, or patriarchalists ... traditionalists ... or hierarchicalists."

William J. Webb describes himself as a "complementary egalitarian". He defines this as "full interdependence and 'mutual submission' within marriage, and the only differences in roles are 'based upon biological differences between men and women'." He uses "Complementarianism" to describe what he calls "a milder form of the historical hierarchical view." Complementarian scholar Wayne A. Grudem objects to Webb's use of "complementary" and "egalitarian" together to describe a thoroughly egalitarian position. Calling the terminology "offensive and confusing," he reasons that doing so simply confuses the issues by using the term "complementary" for a position totally antithetical to what complementarians hold. Grudem finds Webb's use of the term "patriarchy" to be especially pejorative because of its connotations in modern society. He also rejects the term "hierarchicalist" because he says it overemphasizes structured authority while giving no suggestion of equality or the beauty of mutual interdependence.

== See also ==
- African and African-American women in Christianity
- Katharine Bushnell, pioneer Christian feminist
- Catharism#Role of women
- Christians for Biblical Equality, an egalitarian organization
- Female disciples of Jesus
- Feminist theology
- List of Christian women of the patristic age
- List of women hymnwriters
- List of women in the Bible
- Quaker views on women
- The Woman's Bible
- Women and religion
- Women as theological figures
- Women in Buddhism
- Women in Church history
- Women in Hinduism
- Women in Islam
- Women in Judaism
- Women in the Bible
