= William J. Webb =

William J. Webb (born 1957) is a theologian, ordained Baptist minister, and former professor of New Testament at Heritage Seminary, Ontario. He is currently adjunct professor at Tyndale Seminary in Toronto. He is notable for developing the "redemptive-movement" hermeneutic in his book Slaves, Women & Homosexuals: Exploring the Hermeneutics of Cultural Analysis (2001). This book argues for full role equality of men and women in the church and family while concluding that homosexuality is not a biblically sanctioned lifestyle. Craig Blomberg argues that Webb's "proposals concerning redemptive trajectories are among the more influential (and controversial) of new twenty-first century North American hermeneutical methods to emerge."

== Bibliography ==
- Returning Home (Journal for the Study of the New Testament Supplement) (Sheffield, 1993).
- Slaves, Women & Homosexuals: Exploring the Hermeneutics of Cultural Analysis (InterVarsity Press, 2001).
- Corporal Punishment in the Bible: A Redemptive-Movement Hermeneutic for Troubling Texts (InterVarsity Press, 2011).
- (With Gordon K. Oeste) Bloody, Brutal, and Barbaric?: Wrestling with Troubling War Texts (IVP Academic, 2019).

== See also ==
- Christian views about women
- Homosexuality and Christianity
- Christian egalitarianism
