= Women and religion =

Women's roles and history surrounding religion

The study of women and religion examines women in the context of different religious faiths. This includes considering female gender roles in religious history as well as how women participate in religion. Particular consideration is given to how religion has been used as a patriarchal tool to elevate the status and power of men over women. In addition, different religions address gender more broadly through their doctrines, traditions, and sacred texts. This field often uses intersectionality as a lens, specifically exploring how factors such as race, class, and sexual orientation play into the experiences of women and religion.

== Abrahamic religions ==
=== Christianity ===
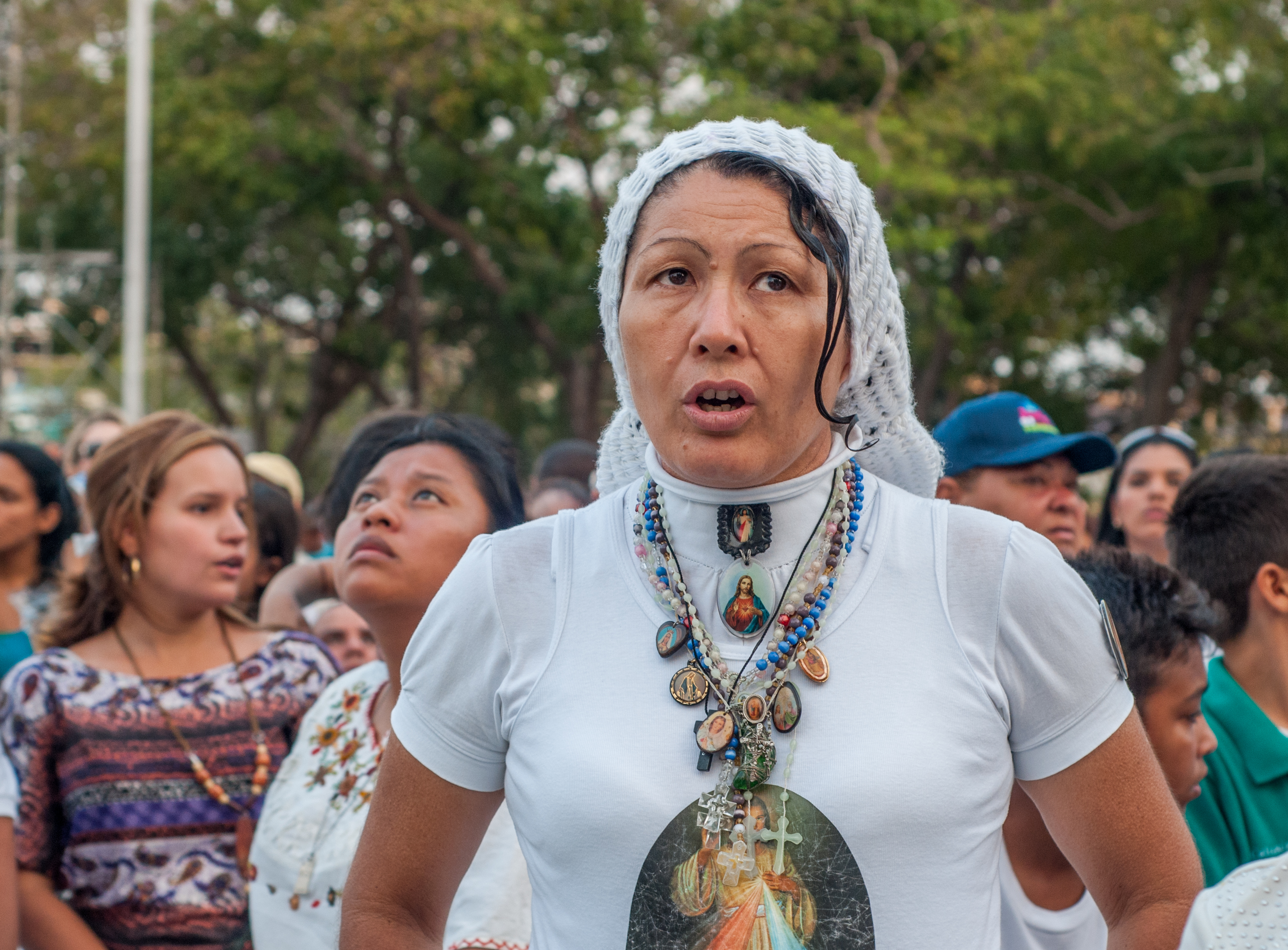
Women in Maracaibo, Venezuela

Christians have vastly diverse views on women's rights, responsibilities, and roles in different times and places. Many Christians believe that women and men are spiritually equal, and that their equality should be expressed in the Church's life. While some perspectives within the religion uphold equality between the sexes, others more rooted in the patriarchy of the ancient world equate cultural principles with religious ones to oppress women. A more patriarchal Christianity sets a mold for women to adhere to and limits their freedom in the church. According to such interpretations of the Christian Bible, wives are expected to be submissive in many ways. They are asked to be submissive to their husbands, the church, their community, and God. "At the head of every household is a man; at the head of a man is Christ, and the head of every woman is a man, and the head of Christ is God." Wives are seen as second in the family household, only to their husbands. This suggests that men are at the forefront of Christianity and adds to the issue of equal rights for women in the religion. In 2020, it has been estimated that the female share of the World's Christian Population is around 51.6%.

According to a scripture in Genesis, “the Lord God said, it is not good that the man should be alone; I will make him a help meet (fit or suitable) for him, suggesting that women are to play a supportive role to men and in Colossians and Peter, women are called to submit to their husbands. In 1 Timothy 2:12, Paul writes that he does not permit a woman to teach or to have authority over a man.

While it has been estimated that the female share (those of the age 20 years and over) of the world's Christian population is between 52 and 53 percent, leadership roles in modern organized churches and sects of Christianity are often restricted to males. In the Roman Catholic Church, Eastern Orthodox Churches and Oriental Orthodox Churches, only men may serve as priests or deacons. In addition, only males serve in senior leadership positions such as pope, patriarch, and bishop. However, in Christian history, women have been ordained to the diaconate and performed equal duties with male deacons. Although ordaining women as deacons fell out of mainstream practice many centuries ago, many Orthodox Churches have re-instated them to varying degrees. In 2017, Ani-Kristi Manvelian was ordained and consecrated with her male counterparts in the diaconate at Saint Sarkis Cathedral in Tehran. In addition to serving in the clergy, women may serve as nuns and abbesses.

Although many voices within Christianity profess equality for all and say women and men were created equally, women have been subject to the patriarchy embedded in the religion in some places and expressions. It is the patriarchy of society that influences Christianity and puts men in positions of power. Though women have played a vital role in the church, as expressed by the Acts and many others, none have ever been allowed leadership. Historically, women such as Mary Magdalene, who played a major role in supporting Jesus and the ministry, show just how influential women have been to Christianity.

The Apostle Paul is a great example in showing this as he worked, “side by side with them for the furtherance of the gospel,” but never himself appointed any women in roles of power. Women in the patriarchal forms of Christianity can be roughly summarised in the following quote: “Although, women are spiritual equals with men and the ministry of women is essential to the body of Christ, women are excluded from leadership over men in the church.” However, there are many exceptions to that in other expressions, times, and forms of the Christian faith. Especially during the middle ages, abbesses were women of significant authority and influence. They exercised spiritual authority not only over their nuns, but also over the monks at a double monastery. Whether the house was intended for women, men, or both, the abbess was always to be obeyed as the head of the house. From what history tells us, it is safe to conclude that the mainstream Christianity's hierarchy has benefitted women by putting them in places of authority over men. This is despite whatever cultural oppression some male leaders may have encouraged.

Many Christians in mainstream denominations not excluding Methodists, Episcopalians, Presbyterians and others disagree with the idea that women should not have leadership positions. There are New Testament texts which exhort Christians not to discriminate between men and women; for one example, Galatians 3:28 "There is neither Jew nor Gentile, neither slave nor free, nor is there male and female, for you are all one in Christ Jesus." A small minority of women are also mentioned in the New Testament as probably holding leadership positions, such as Phoebe, Junia, Priscilla and a few others. Note that many translators dispute the meaning or degree of leadership in these references. Modern popular female preachers like Joyce Meyer, Paula White and Kathryn Kuhlman have had or have leadership roles in Church. It is also mentioned in the Old Testament that women such as Deborah and Huldah were Prophets. In the New Testament Philip was said to have four daughters who prophesied.

Notably, Christians who believe in the veneration of saints hold the Virgin Mary in high regard. Catholic, Orthodox, and some other Christians believe that she is to be honoured and esteemed as the holiest and greatest of all created people. After the Holy Trinity, they honour her as the secondary paragon of holiness and goodness. As a result, they revere her with various and sundry titles, including "Queen of Heaven". There is much to be said for a sect of faith that venerates a woman as the greatest human being of all time. This is despite what other sects of that religion may declare or do.

The Gospel of Mary, a work tied to Christian Gnosticism, is the only known surviving apocryphal text that is named after a woman. According to its narrative, Mary Magdalene was the only follower of Jesus who truly understood his teachings.

Within Christianity, some scholars argue that patriarchal theology reflects systems of oppression, which results in extreme biblical interpretation that has been used to teach the idea that men are leaders while women should submit to men. Verses frequently used to support patriarchal gender norms include, “Wives, submit yourselves to your husbands as you do to the Lord” Ephesians 5:22–24as well as “I do not permit a woman to teach or to assume authority over a man” 1 Timothy 2:12. However, some Christian theologians argue that these interpretations fail to properly understand their context and meaning, while others may reject the teachings based on the idea that they are specific to certain cultural and historical contexts or because they fail to accurately reflect the teachings of Jesus.

However, not all women experience Christianity the same way. In regard to race, women of color, including Black, Indigenous, and Latina women, all experience oppression via racial religious structures intersecting patriarchal ones as compared to white Christian women due to the long-lasting effects of colonialism, slavery, and segregation. During the period of the expansion of European colonization, Christianity was used to justify slavery and the forced conversion of Indigenous and African people.

=== Judaism ===
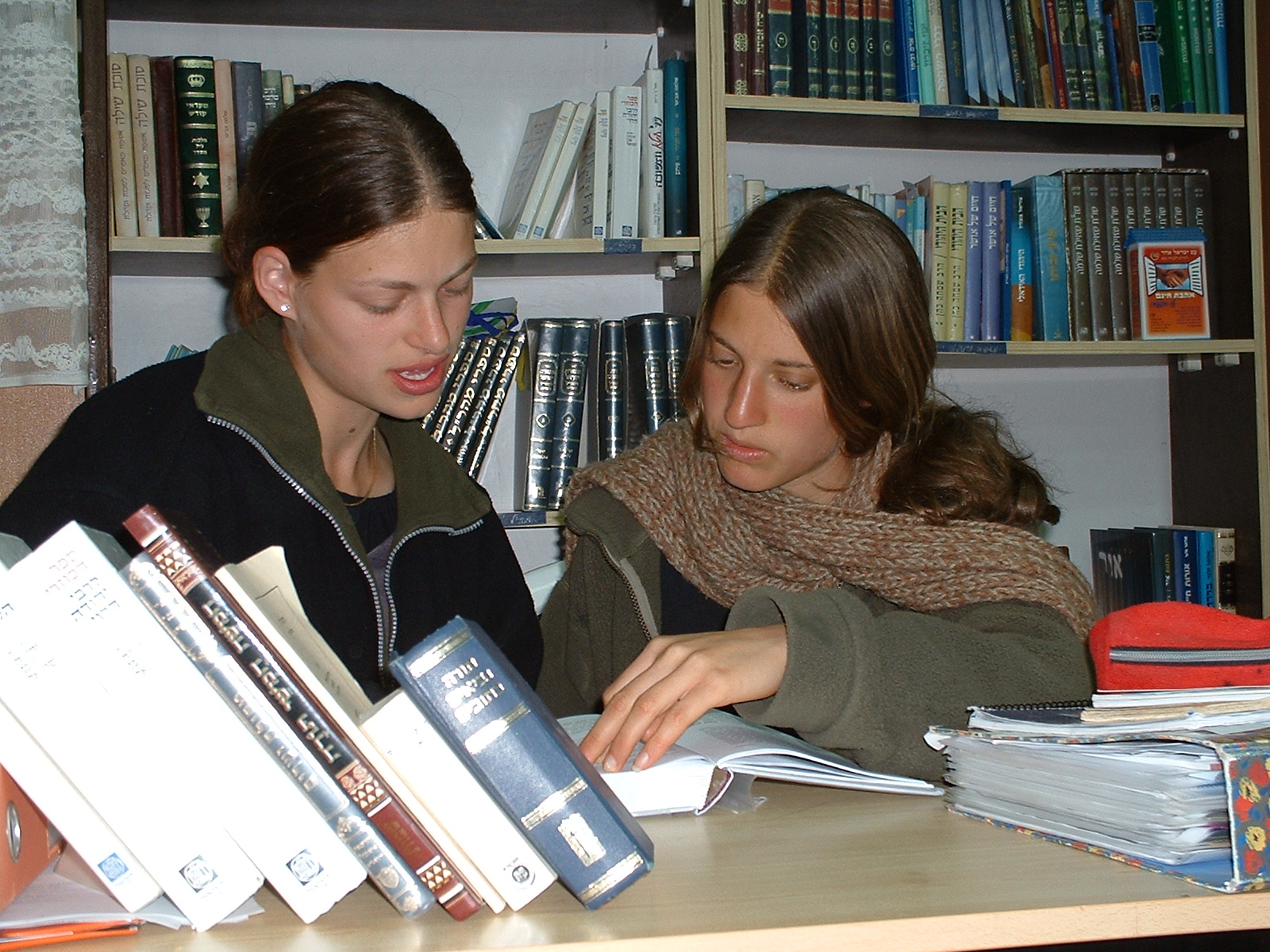
Two students at a Midrasha, a school for girls to study the Torah

Women's role in Judaism is determined by the Hebrew Bible, the Oral Law (the corpus of rabbinic literature, including the Talmud), by custom, and by non-religious cultural factors. The Hebrew Bible and rabbinic literature mention various female role models. Religious law treats women differently in various circumstances. In historical Jewish texts, all people were seen as equal at the highest level: God. The Hebrew Bible states that “man” was made of both “male and female”, and originally had a dual gender for God, but this disappeared and God became referred to as "He and Him". In Judaism, God has never been exclusively viewed as male or masculine, but rather, God has both masculine and feminine qualities.

Judaism emphasizes family. Gender affects familial lines: in traditional Judaism, Jewishness is passed down through the mother, though the status of belonging to one of the three groups within Judaism (kohen, levite, or Israel) is inherited through the father. The Hebrew Scripture uses the father's name to identify sons and daughters, such as, "Dinah, daughter of Jacob". Responsibilities were not taken lightly for the family. Traditionally and in Orthodox Judaism, the "akeret habayit," or woman of the house, is referred to as the mainstay of the house, or "akeret habayit." According to a 2017 study by the Pew Research Center, women (aged 20 years and over) are slightly more numerous among the worldwide Jewish population (52%).

Women have been highly regarded within the Jewish community because they are capable of a great degree of "binah" (institution, understanding, intelligence). The term, “women of valor,” describes Jewish women's ideal characteristics. Traditionally, she devoted all her energies towards the “physical and spiritual well-being of her family.” Her continuous care enabled her husband and children to flourish, her personal reward being their successes. However, that role has been reshaped over time. The impact of "women of valor" extended beyond the household and into the community. Volunteer work has allowed women to sharpen their leadership and organizational skills. While it may seem that women have only had influence in smaller communities, Jewish women have eventually established enough authority to emerge as public figures. In 1972, Sally Priesand became the first woman ordained as a rabbi, in the Reform denomination. Women in the Reform, Conservative, Reconstructionist, and Renewal denominations are now able to lead worship services, read the Torah, and give drashas (sermons) just as men do, often contributing a different perspective.

=== Islam ===
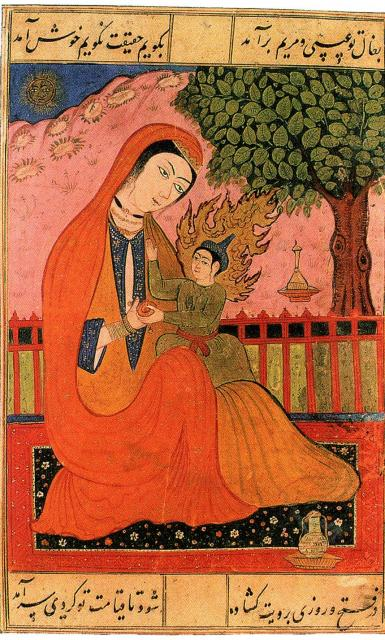
Mary and Jesus in a Persian miniature

Islam is a monotheistic religion founded in the early seventh century by Muhammad. Whilst the Quran is the central text of the religion, additional texts such as the Hadith and fatwas, as well as methologies such as ijma, qiyas, and ijtihad, are widely regarded as key sources for Islamic principles.

Islamic teachings recognize men and women as equals in their ability to carry out God's wishes and Muhammad's teaching. The three main things sharia law introduced were women’s rights to marriage, inheritance, and divorce. It also restricted polygyny, by limiting men to marrying a maximum of four women at a time, requiring the husband to take care of each wife equally and properly. Muhammad himself had several wives, marrying some widows to give them a home and protection.

Muslims observe the five pillars of Islam: praying five times a day, fasting during the month of Ramadan, making a pilgrimage to Mecca, donating to charity, and accepting God as the only god and Muhammad as God's prophet. Women have restrictions on praying in public, given instead separate private spaces. Women are exempt from the obligatory prayers during menstruation because they are considered to be in a state of ritual impurity (hayd). Additionally, if women are pregnant or nursing during the month of Ramadan, they do not need to fast. Scholars and believers interpret these exemptions as relief from religious obligations during a physically demanding time.

Due to their isolation, it became the responsibility of the ummah, or Muslim community, to pass down the customs and traditions that mold a Muslim women's life. This guidance, sharia, and Islamic scripture outlined the structure for her education, employment opportunities, rights to inheritance, dress, public appearance, domestic 'duties', age of marriage, freedom to consent to marriage, marriage contract, mahr, permissibility of birth control, divorce, sex outside or before marriage, ability to receive justice in case of sex crimes, property rights independent of her husband, and when salat (prayers) are mandatory for her.

Notably, the 19th chapter of the Quran, titled Maryam, tells the story of Mary. Hibba Abugideiri argues that that Quran holds Mary in higher regard to other women featured in Islam's intellectual milieu, such as Eve or Aisha, instead considering her to be a prophet and providing her with a status equivalent to that of Abraham.

Islamic texts found in the Quran and the Prophet Muhammads teachings, give women spiritual as well as moral dignity. “Indeed, the most noble of you in the sight of God is the most righteous of you.” (Qur’an 49:13, Saheeh International) “I will not let the deeds of any doer among you go to waste, male or female; you are of one another.” (Qur’an 3:195, Saheeh International) Despite such, women do face oppression because of patriarchal interpretations of Islam's Holy texts on top of political systems playing a role as well.

== East and Southeast Asian religions ==
=== Taoism ===
Women hold an important position in Taoist schools which recognise their unique capabilities to communicate with transcendent realms. Since imagery of gestation and cultivating an 'immortal embryo' are foregrounded in Neidan practices, a woman's ability to carry a child gives her seeming advantage over men in Taoist practices. This is in contrast with the taboo that women are considered to be 'impure' due to menstruation which is also prevalent in Neidan literature.

Notable Tao goddesses include Xiwang mu, who is considered to be the goddess of epidemics and is described as having 'a human body, a leopard's tail and tiger's teeth'. Revere, however, is accorded not only to goddesses or female deities within the tradition, but also to practitioners, particularly those who have founded Taoist schools themselves. Examples include Wei Huacun, the inaugural matriarch of the Highest Clarity School, Cao Wenyi, a poet who wrote about the Dao and is considered the first woman to practice Neidan, and Zu Shu, a prominent matriarch of the Pure Subtlety school and a Tang Priestess.

Taoism's philosophy at its core, sees feminine energy as powerful and an essential force. Yin is an example of this belief as it is the feminine force and is seen as equal with Yang, the masculine force. Despite Taoism teaching that women are not inferior to men and are just as important, the cultures which practice Taoism have deep roots in the patriarchy. Women face institutional oppression as historically, Taoist institutions have been led by men, and women where given roles with less authority such as becoming nuns.

== Indian religions ==
=== Buddhism ===
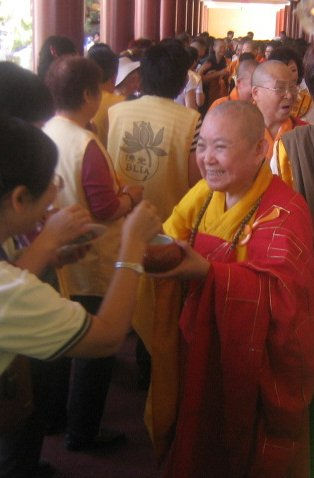
A high-ranking Bhikkhuni in the Chinese Buddhist tradition during an alms round

The prevalence of the Bhikkuni Sangha, the female monastic tradition, within Buddhism is indicative of the respect given to women within the religion. As Céline Grünhagen notes, however, the initial establishment of a female sangha was met with opposition from the Buddha himself, who suggested that allowing the initiation of women would mean that his teaching would only last for 500 years rather than 1,000. Pushing back against a literal interpretation, Alan Sponberg argues that this story should be read in a 'symbolic' way that is telling of the social dynamics in which the female monastic tradition was established.

One of the main schools of tradition that originated from the early development of Buddhism, called Theravāda Buddhism, expresses the assumption that “all men and women, regardless of their caste, origins, or status, have equal spiritual worth.” Because Buddhism can be described as a religious and philosophical ideology that does not have an explicit “Creator” there is no implied “sacredness” in relation to one’s human form, which means that the practice itself is not bound to the ideas of gender, reproduction, and sexuality.

However, it is argued that Buddhist traditions still have underlying issues pertaining to gender roles. While Buddhist ideologies may be considered a revolutionary step forward in the status of women, many still consider the tradition to be subject to the social and political context of undermining gender issues during its upbringing, and even up to this day. The progression of gender issues, especially between gender and authority, can be seen during the time period of Hinayana Buddhism, when the Buddhist order underwent major reforms of splitting into about 20 different schools. During this time Buddhist narratives and beliefs arose limiting the status of women’s roles within the Buddhist communities, asserting that women could not reach enlightenment, or Buddhahood. This also meant that women would not attain positions of leadership because that they could not reach enlightenment, unless they “gain good karma and are reborn as men beforehand.”

Alternatively, Khandro Rinpoche, a female lama in Tibetan Buddhism, shows a more optimistic view in regards to women in Buddhism:

When there is a talk about women and Buddhism, I have noticed that people often regard the topic as something new and different.

They believe that women in Buddhism has become an important topic because we live in modern times and so many women are practicing

the Dharma now. However, this is not the case. The female sangha has been here for centuries. We are not bringing something new into a

2,500-year-old tradition. The roots are there, and we are simply re-energizing them.

According to a 2017 study by the Pew Research Center, women (aged 20 years and over) are slightly more numerous among worldwide Buddhist population (54%).

Similarly to Taoism, Buddhism is not inherently oppressive towards women. One of its core beliefs, that everyone, regardless of gender, class, and race, can reach enlightenment (nirvana). “In this world, both man and woman can reach the highest goal, if they have faith and wisdom." (Saṃyutta Nikāya 5.2, Bhikkhu Bodhi) This core belief allows women to interact with Buddhism the same way as their male counterparts, at least in theory. However, when it comes to historical practice, women can face oppression via the male-dominated institutions which perpetuate a patriarchal interpretation of Buddhism. An example would be the Eight Garudhammas, which make nuns subordinate to monks, regardless of if the nun possesses seniority.

=== Hinduism ===
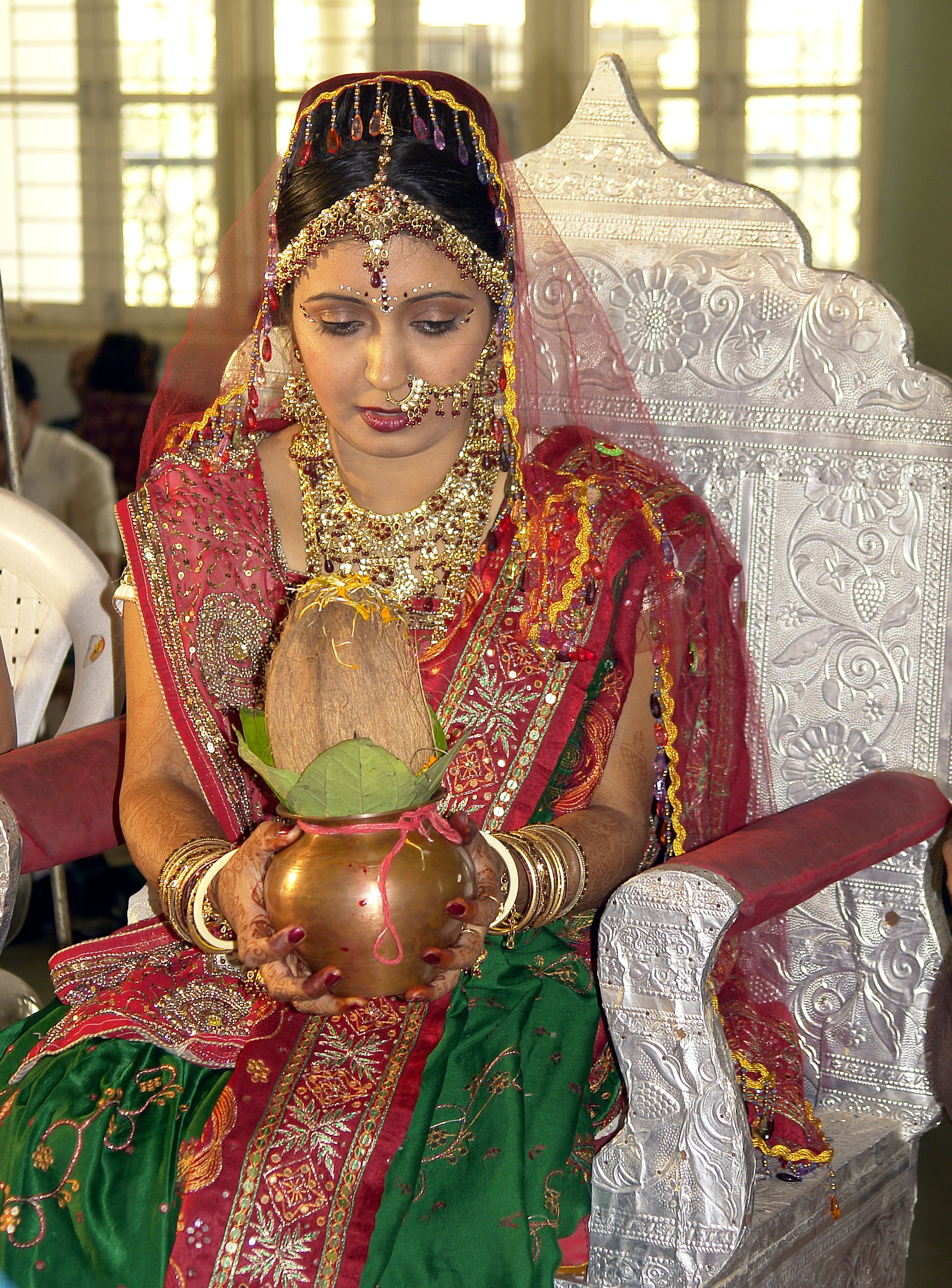
Hindu Bride

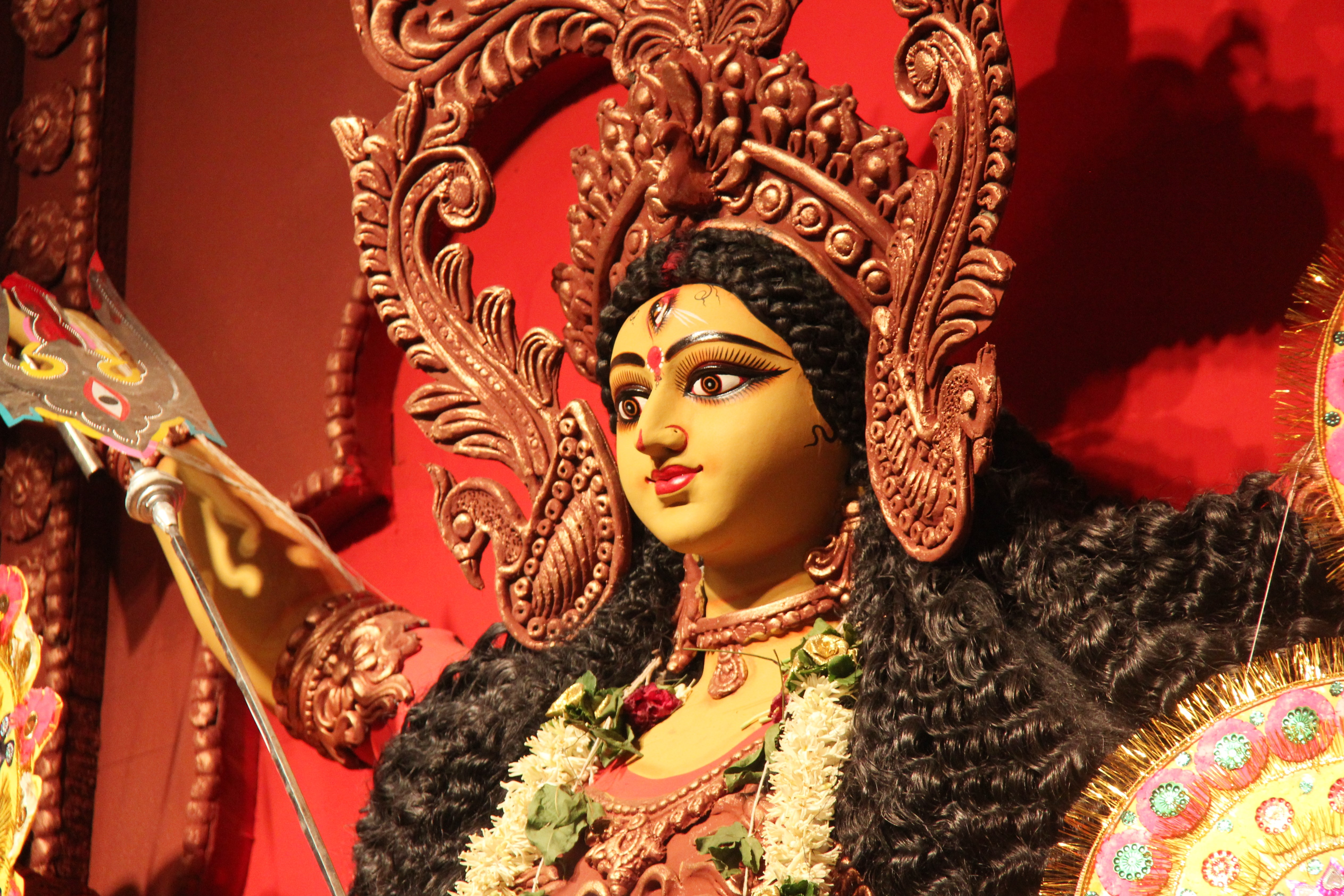
Durga Puja statue, Hiranandani Gardens, Mumbai, India, 2015

Hinduism, has a strong presence of the divine feminine among major world religions, from ancient times to the present. Goddesses are present in Hindu traditions, such as Shaktism and Saivism and are highly venerated. For example, Kali Ma (Dark Mother) "is the Hindu goddess of creation, preservation, and goddess of destruction." Her power included the origin of all creation's life, as well as the end of life. Due to her control over life and death, Kali was seen as a goddess who should be loved as well as feared.

Another important female figure is Shakti or Adishakti or Adiparashakti, the divine feminine - a goddess that embodies the energy of the universe, "often appearing to destroy demonic forces and restore balance". Because Shakti is a universal force, she embodies all the gods in Hinduism and is worshiped as the "mother goddess". In Hindu lore, the Goddess is referred as Devi or Devi Ma, meaning Mother Goddess. The Goddess is considered as the progenitor, sustainer and ultimately, the destroyer of the universe. She is worshipped as Durga - the warrior Goddess, Kali - the Goddess of time and death and regeneration, Lalita Tripurasundari - the divine lady of All Worlds and as Bhuvaneshwari, the Goddess of the Universe. The Goddess is worshipped in many forms as Lakshmi, the Goddess of wealth, fortune and prosperity and as Saraswati, the Goddess of knowledge, arts, education and learning.

Throughout history, Hindu women have held public religious positions as practitioners and conductors of Vedic Rituals. Hindu society has seen many female rulers, such as Rudramadevi, Rani Abbakka, Rani Durgavati, Rani Ahilyabai Holkar, Rani Chennamma of Keladi, women saints, such as Andal, philosophers, such as Maitreyi, and religious reformers.

Devdutt Pattnaik asserts that "Hindu mythology reveals that patriarchy, the idea that men are superior to women, was invented", a societal shift in power occurred between men and women, sometimes to the point where a woman was in a subordinated position to a male. On the other side, matriarchal theology is quite prevalent in Sanskritic traditions and village Hinduism relating to the worship of Shakti, and there are numerous Hindu communities that are matriarchal.

Although women have been worshipped as Goddesses in Hindu religion, women have also been oppressed and given subordinate position. Manusmriti, a revered Hindu text, mentions that women cannot acquire property, women have to be subservient to men and should not disrespect their husband even if he is a drunkard.. It further states, "Her father protects (her) in childhood, her husband protects (her) in youth, and her sons protect (her) in old age; a woman is never fit for independence".. Practices of Sati, dowry and female foeticide are largely prevalent among Hindu populations.

According to a 2017 study by the Pew Research Center, women (aged 20 years and over) are slightly less prevalent among worldwide Hindu population (49%).

=== Jainism ===
Jainism is an ancient Indian religion founded around the sixth century BCE. Janism is a nontheistic religion currently practiced in multiple countries, due to Jain settlers who immigrated there (mainly United Kingdom, United States, Canada and some African countries). Jainism is inclusive of women. One of the cornerstones of the religion is the “fourfold" sangha which describes the Jainism community, which is made up of monks, nuns, laymen and laywomen.

The religious status of women is a very important aspect of the history of the religion and one of the most critical issues between the oldest religious divisions of the religion, Svetambar and Digambar. The major distinction between these two divisions is the position of women in their societies. Digambar Jains believe that women are not capable of being enlightened due to the belief that the male can let go of all his material possessions in order to attain enlightenment including clothes whereas a woman cannot because of social norms.

While Svetambar Jains have opposite beliefs, believing that women are able to become renouncers, are capable of enlightenment and can become religious role models. Women, especially among Svetambar Jains, are believed to be deceitful, and that this characteristic is the main foundation of their character, to the extent that rebirth as a woman is a consequence of being deceitful in a former life. One of their sacred texts states:

“As the result of manifesting deception, a man in this world becomes a woman. As a woman, if her heart is pure, she becomes a man in this world.”

Women are important in Jainism, playing a major role in its structure (nuns and laywomen), making up two of the four categories within the community and participating in the continuation and spread of the religion. The Jain social structure is patriarchal, with men holding primary leadership roles in the society. Except for modern times, Jain women have been unable to speak for themselves or to tell their stories. Almost all the texts regarding Jain women's roles and experiences have been written by monks, who are males. The pan-Indian belief that women are “weak-minded”, “deceptive”, “fickle”, “treacherous” and “impure” are beliefs common to Jainism and mentioned various times in their sacred and later texts.

Jain women do have significant roles, however, especially in the performance of certain rituals. But there are various rituals women still aren't allowed to perform; for example, bathing or touching the statue of Gods. Though some temples have altered the rules, there are many temples who still don't allow it.

Jain women are nuns and laywomen in this society. In the fourfold community, the mendicants (monks and nuns) center their lives around asceticism. There are stricter rules/restrictions on nuns in their daily routine and rituals compared to those for monks. And nuns are dependent and subordinate to monks. More years are needed by nuns to gain higher positions in comparison to monks. Although nuns may have seniority in tenure they may be subservient to monks with fewer years in their religious life.

The laity, which consists of laymen and laywomen, are very important to Jainism for its survival and economic foundation. The laity support the mendicant orders, following rules which create the groundwork of the religion. For example, the doctrine of Jainism places great emphasis on dietary practices. Laywomen play a very important role in ensuring that the rules surrounding dietary practices are followed, as their first and major responsibility is the preparation of meals.

=== Sikhism ===
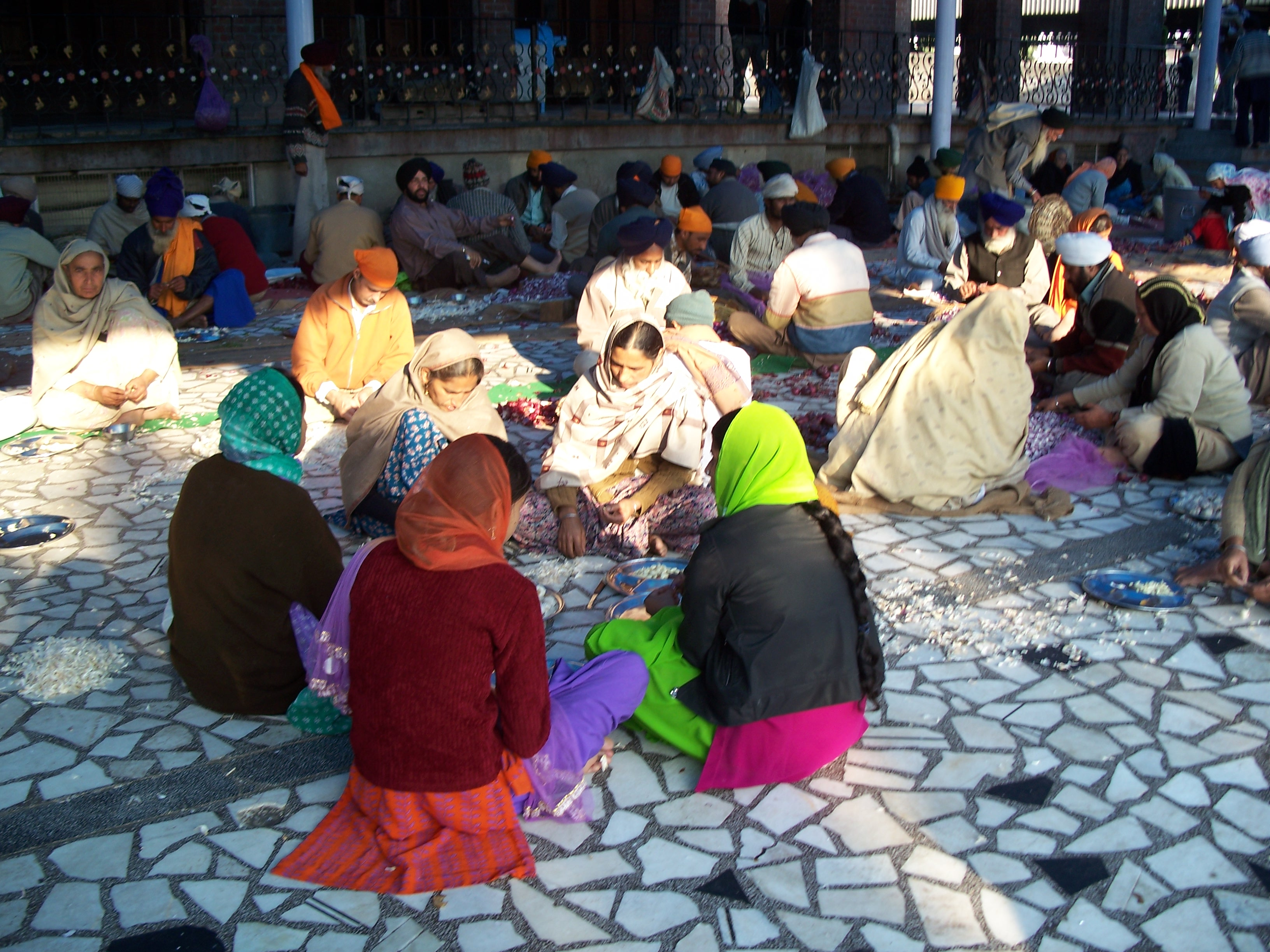
Volunteers preparing langar at the Golden Temple in Amritsar, India

According to Sikhism, men and women are two sides of the same coin. There is a system of inter-relation and inter-dependence where man is born of woman, and woman is born of man's seed. According to Sikhism a man can not feel secure and complete during his life without a woman, and a man's success is related to the love and support of the woman who shares her life with him, and vice versa. The founder of Sikhism, Guru Nanak, reportedly said in 1499 that "It is a woman who keeps the race going" and that we should not "consider woman cursed and condemned when from woman are born leaders and rulers".

Sikhs have had an obligation to treat women as equals, and gender discrimination in Sikh society has not been allowed. However, gender equality has been difficult to achieve

At the time of the Gurus, women were considered very low in society. Women were treated as mere property whose only value was as a servant or for entertainment. They were considered seducers and distractions from man's spiritual path. Men were allowed polygamy but widows were not allowed to remarry; instead, they were encouraged to burn themselves on their husbands funeral pyre (sati). Child marriage and female infanticide were prevalent and purdah (veils) were popular for women. Women were also not allowed to inherit any property. Many Hindu women were captured and sold as slaves in foreign countries.

The Sikh faith is 500 years old. Guru Nanak spread the message of equality and love. Guru Nanak preached about a universal God which is not limited to different religions, race, colour, gender, and nation. The Sikh belief is made up of justice and human rights with historical examples of the Sikh Gurus as well as their followers that make sacrifices for their faith and religion.

== Indigenous Religions ==
The Indigenous women in North America have played important roles in many ceremonial practices as well as spiritual traditions throughout North America. When it comes to Western religion there has been a complicated past when in connection with Indigenous communities. This is due to the harm that has been done to Indigenous communities by those of Western religion. While on the other hand Western religion has helped to provide preservation of practices and languages when ceremonies were outlawed.

One of the most well-known organized Indigenous religions is the Native American Church. This religion is described as the pan-Indian movement. With roots coming from peyote ceremonial practices that come from Mexico and spread North. When ceremonial practices were banned Christian sacramental elements were used to help keep Indigenous customs alive. The Native American Church supports religious sovereignty, cultural revitalization, and self-determination. The role women took on was helping prepare meals as part of the ceremony as well as participating in the ceremony itself. Indigenous religion practices also continue into modern movements.

For instance, Idle No More, which is a First Nations movement which focuses on treaty rights and environmental justice. Women have played prominent leadership roles within the movement, which draws upon Indigenous traditions which emphasize responsibility to land and community. This movement uses ceremony as a form of activism, drawing in Indigenous spiritual practices into more public spaces.

== See also ==
- Ordination of women
- Timeline of women in religion
- Timeline of women's ordination
- Women as theological figures
