= Colorado Springs Guidelines =

1997 document to address gender issues in Bible translation

The Colorado Springs Guidelines is a 1997 document to address gender issues in Bible translation. It was written by theologically conservative Christians in response to "gender-neutral" Bible translations, in particular the New International Version Inclusive Language Edition.

According to two participants at the Colorado Springs meeting, the final list of guidelines was compiled by reference to two separate lists drafted by each of the two ostensibly opposing parties who had agreed to the meeting to discuss their differences. One list was supplied by concerned scholars and pastors, the other by Ken Barker on behalf of translators and publishers.

== See also ==
- Danvers Statement
- Journal for Biblical Manhood and Womanhood
- Recovering Biblical Manhood and Womanhood
- Today's New International Version (TNIV)

== Bibliography and external links ==
- Colorado Springs Guidelines — copy at Bible-Researcher.com, edited by Michael D. Marlowe.

=== Supportive of the Guidelines ===
- Grudem, Wayne A. (June 1998). "A Response to Mark Strauss' Evaluation of the Colorado Springs Translation Guidelines". Journal of the Evangelical Theological Society. 41: 263–286.
- Poythress, Vern and Wayne Grudem. The Gender-Neutral Bible Controversy: Muting the Masculinity of God's Words. Nashville, Tennessee: Broadman and Holman Publishers, 2000.

=== Critical of the Guidelines ===
- Carson, Don Arthur. The Inclusive-Language Debate: A Plea for Realism. Grand Rapids, Michigan: Baker Book House, 1998.
- Strauss, Mark L. Distorting Scripture?: The Challenge of Bible Translation & Gender Accuracy. InterVarsity Press, 1998.
- An Evaluation of the ‘Colorado Springs Guidelines’, Ellis W. Deibler, Jr., TNIV web site (tniv.info), June 2002

=== Other ===
- Ryken, Leland. The Word of God in English: Criteria for Excellence in Bible Translation. Grand Rapids, Michigan: Crossway Books, 2002. ISBN 1-58134-464-3
