= Christian egalitarianism =

Belief in gender equality based in Christianity

Christian egalitarianism, also known as biblical equality, is egalitarianism based in Christianity. Christian egalitarians believe that the Bible advocates for gender equality and equal responsibilities for the family unit and the ability for women to exercise spiritual authority as clergy.

In contrast to Christian complementarianists and Christian patriarchists, proponents of Christian egalitarianism argue that Bible verses often used to justify patriarchal domination in gender roles are misinterpreted. Egalitarians believe in a form of mutual submission in which all people submit to each other in relationships and institutions as a code of conduct without a need for hierarchical authority.

== Gender equality ==
Christian egalitarianism refers to a biblically based belief that gender, in and of itself, neither privileges nor curtails a believer's gifting or calling to ministry in the church or at home. It does not imply that women and men are identical or undifferentiated, but asserts that God designed men and women to complement and benefit one another.

A wide range of denominations embraces egalitarian beliefs:

- Quakers (Friends) affirm the absolute equality and ministry participation of all members without gender distinction.
- Wesleyan Church upholds equality of men and women, rooted in creation theology and the conviction that both were made in the image of God, stewarding ministry and leadership equally.
- United Methodist Church also affirms the equal ordination and leadership of women and men across all levels of church structure.
- ECO: A Covenant Order of Evangelical Presbyterians officially ordains women as pastors and elders; ECO was founded in 2012 and has a growing membership across the U.S.
- Church of the Nazarene, Assemblies of God, and Free Methodist Church consistently affirm women in ministry, while maintaining traditional views on sexuality.
- Episcopal Church (USA) ordains women at all levels, maintains an anti-sexism task force, and opposes gender-based discrimination in church and civic life.

Other denominations and movements that often embody egalitarian practice include some Mennonite groups, Moravians, and certain Evangelical Covenant Church and American Baptist congregations.

== Biblical justifications ==
All three Synoptic Gospels record Jesus as saying:

You know that the rulers of the Gentiles lord it over them, and their high officials exercise authority over them. But it shall not be so among you.

Christian egalitarians interpret "lord it over" to imply oppressive leadership, whereas "exercise authority" is viewed as potentially neutral or relational, rather than abusive. Recent scholarship interprets Jesus' words as rejecting domination in favor of a servant leadership approach.

The Apostle Paul wrote:

There is neither Jew nor Greek, slave nor free, male nor female, for you are all one in Christ Jesus.

— Galatians 3:28

Egalitarian scholars widely cite Galatians 3:28 as a foundational passage. Paul emphasizes that all believers share complete unity and equal standing in Christ, regardless of gender, ethnicity, or social class.

Christian egalitarians affirm that Jesus' example and teaching abolished discrimination against racial minorities, slaves, and women in both church and marriage. They believe that the Bible teaches the fundamental equality of believers across all racial, ethnic, and economic divisions.

They argue that overarching principles of the Bible affirm that men and women are equally created in God's image, equally responsible for sin, equally redeemed by Christ, and equally gifted by God's Spirit for service. Each person is held responsible for using their God-given gifts regardless of gender.

The New Testament mentions Aquila and his wife Priscilla together as a couple in all six occurrences. Their order of appearance alternates evenly: Aquila appears first in the first, third, and fifth mentions, and Priscilla (Prisca) appears first in the second, fourth, and sixth mentions. Some revisions of the Bible put Priscilla rather than Aquila first in Acts 18:26, following the Vulgate and a few Greek texts. Some scholars suggest that Priscilla led their ministry and household.

Christian egalitarians teach that all people possess equal fundamental worth and moral status, grounding this belief in the doctrine that God created humanity in the image of God (Imago Dei).

Egalitarians argue that Jesus Christ did not conform to cultural prejudices against women but instead challenged gender-based inequality through his teaching and actions.

Illustrative of efforts to institutionalize this belief are excerpts from the Statement of Faith of Christians for Biblical Equality, a leading Christian egalitarian organization:

- We believe in the equality and essential dignity of men and women of all ethnicities, ages, and classes. We recognize that all persons are made in the image of God and are to reflect that image in the community of believers, in the home, and society.
- We believe that men and women are to diligently develop and use their God-given gifts for the good of the home, church and society.

— Christians for Biblical Equality

== History ==
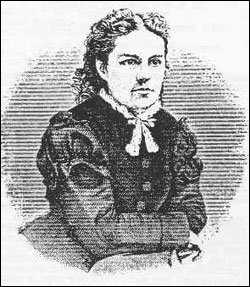
Anna Oliver, the first woman to earn a Bachelor of Divinity from a Methodist seminary in the U.S., who challenged ordination policies in 1880

Anna Oliver (1849–1892) was the first woman in the United States to receive a Bachelor of Divinity from a Methodist seminary (Boston University, 1876). She formally challenged the Methodist Episcopal Church's policies at the 1880 General Conference. Although denied full clergy rights at that time, her efforts set in motion the eventual gradual acceptance of women's ordination, culminating in full ordination in 1956.

The first organization created with the explicit purpose of advocating Christian egalitarianism was "Men, Women and God," founded in the United Kingdom in 1984.

In 1987, American evangelical leaders—including Catherine Clark Kroeger, Gilbert Bilezikian, W. Ward Gasque, Gretchen Gaebelein Hull, and Alvera Mickelsen—formed "Men, Women and God: Christians for Biblical Equality," later shortened to "Christians for Biblical Equality" (CBE). This group launched the journal Priscilla Papers and issued the foundational statement "Men, Women and Biblical Equality" in the early 1990s. Christians for Biblical Equality formally incorporated in January 1988 and now includes members from over 100 denominations across more than 65 countries worldwide.

== Egalitarian anthropologies ==
Titled by Rosemary Radford Ruether's work in Christian theology, Egalitarian anthropologies explore varying views of gender equality in Christianity. These include eschatological feminism, liberal feminism, and romantic feminism. Ruether argues that all of these anthropologies share a common conviction: God originally intended gender equality, but humanity distorted that divine design. Ruether goes on to point out that the belief in the ideal of gender equality "leaves room for considerable variation in relating this equality to women's present subjugated state in history under patriarchy." In the preceding statement, Ruether qualifies the need for further exploration into the following anthropologies.

=== Eschatological feminism ===
Ruether connects eschatological feminism to mysticism and asceticism by way of its roots in transcendentalism. She asserts that the original human, Adam, was androgynous and that "the fall" was the initial creation of gender. She reaffirms this point in a later article, "Sexism and Misogyny in the Christian Tradition: Liberating Alternatives", referencing Galatians 3:28, saying that through baptism androgyny is restored. Sexuality, the main division between genders, is said to be the root of female subordination. Relationships that are typically rooted in sexuality (marriage and motherhood) place women in roles that are subordinate to society's patriarchal norms. The path to equality is believed to be found when women transcend these roles—traditionally through celibacy (as seen in the life of Paul). Transcending worldly norms, which the Bible instructs Christians to do, brings men and women to the state of androgyny that eliminates gender subordination; thus, Christianity is intended to manifest gender equality. Ruether says that transcendence is the core of eschatological feminism; women reach equality with men by separating from the world, rather than changing it.

=== Liberal feminism ===
Liberal feminism rejects the notion that creation established the patriarchy; Ruether asserts that gender equality originally existed, but was distorted by historical injustices against women. This branch of egalitarianism advocates for the restoration of gender equality rather than its introduction. "Economic, political, social, and systemic reforms will restore this equality. Ruether includes the church in her discussion of social reform, highlighting its role in perpetuating gender subordination. Ruether continues saying, "The Church as a bearer of redeemed humanity ought especially to represent this equality of men and women in its institutional life. But it does so as a paradigm of what all social institutions should become, not as a representative of an eschatological humanity outside of and beyond history." Here she distinguishes liberal from eschatological feminism, stating that liberal feminism calls for liberation within society, rather than removal from it.

=== Romantic feminism ===
Ruether states that in romantic feminism, the distinction between genders is found primarily in "spiritual" traits. Ruether references a sixteenth century humanist, Cornelius Agrippa, saying that women have an "affinity with divine Wisdom that gives them moral and spiritual superiority". Women are perceived to be innately altruistic, sensitive, and pure—traits that are considered morally superior compared to "male traits". Ruether continues saying that men and women are both inherently capable of goodness. Still, because of the patriarchy placing men into positions of power, more negative character traits are manifested (pride, aggression, dominance, etc.). Since women are not allowed into positions of power, Ruether supposes that they retain humanity's natural goodness. Romantic feminism contains varying ideologies in itself, which are as follows.

==== Conservative romanticism ====
According to Ruether, conservative romanticism suggests that women should remain at home to preserve their goodness. Ruether says, "If a woman leaves the home to take up a traditional male occupation, she will straightaway lose this good femininity and become a she-male, a monstrous virago, or will become debased to carnal femaleness, fallen woman." In one survey conducted in 1999, a researcher concluded based on participants' responses, "Even though husbands were not always the sole providers, for the majority of men they remained symbolically so, such that women's employment was nearly always described as secondary, even expendable, in light of wives' responsibility to rear and nurture children." Conservative romanticism opposes gender equality in the work force to better preserve traditional roles in the home. A woman's innate goodness makes her the ideal candidate to raise children and support her husband. In turn, this spousal support enables the husband to perform better in the workforce; this trickle-down effect, where women raise good husbands and sons, is how conservative romantics believe women make an impact.

==== Reformist romanticism ====
Reformist romanticism shares many similarities with conservative romanticism, but it emphasizes a key difference: reformists believe that gender equality does not diminish the inherent moral goodness of women. Theologian Rosemary Radford Ruether explains that reformist romanticism encourages women to serve as moral reformers of men and male-dominated institutions. To fulfill this role, women must gain access to education, voting rights, and political power. Reformist thinkers argue that women's innate moral compass makes them essential in leadership roles, where their influence can transform society for the better. They also maintain that women's nature inherently opposes violence, suggesting that female leadership would bring about global peace (Ruether, Sexism and God-Talk, 1983).

==== Radical romanticism ====
Radical romanticism, rooted in radical feminism, completely rejects male culture and actively questions whether men possess the capacity for moral redemption. Ruether notes that radical feminists envision a utopian society that excludes male influence altogether, where women's inherent goodness remains uncorrupted by what they perceive as male inferiority (Ruether, Sexism and God-Talk, 1983).

== Complementarian critique ==
While Christian egalitarians believe that the Bible portrays mostly egalitarian views, except for a few contextually relativized patriarchal texts, complementarians oppose this viewpoint. As a response to the upcoming of evangelical feminism and egalitarianism in the 20th century, prominent theologians and scholars such as John Piper, Wayne Grudem, Raymond C. Ortlund Jr., James A. Borland, Thomas R. Schreiner, D. A. Carson, S. Lewis Johnson, George W. Knight III, Douglas J. Moo, John Frame and Vern Sheridan Poythress contributed to Recovering Biblical Manhood and Womanhood, in which they discuss and rebut most egalitarian viewpoints, such as the use of Galatians 3:28 to defend fundamental equality.

In 1988, the Council on Biblical Manhood and Womanhood (CBMW) published the Danvers Statement as a response to the "widespread uncertainty and confusion in our culture regarding the complementary differences between masculinity and femininity", directly opposing feminist egalitarian beliefs. Similar to the Danvers Statement, CBMW published the 2017 Nashville Statement, affirming differences between male and female. In its Foundation Documents, The Gospel Coalition confesses that "men and women are not simply interchangeable, but rather they complement each other in mutually enriching ways".

== Prominent Christian egalitarians ==
- William and Catherine Booth, founders of the Salvation Army. William Booth once said of the Salvation Army's workforce, "Some of my best men are women!"
- Aimee Semple McPherson, founder of Angelus Temple
- Gilbert Bilezikian, author of Beyond Sex Roles (1985), Christianity 101 (1993)
- Greg Boyd, theologian and Senior Pastor of the Woodland Hills Church in St. Paul, Minnesota, author of Myth of a Christian Religion: Losing your Religion for the Beauty of a Revolution (2009)
- F. F. Bruce, biblical scholar and professor of biblical criticism and exegesis
- Shane Claiborne
- Catherine Clark Kroeger, co-founder of CBE International; co-editor of The IVP Women's Bible Commentary (2002); co-author of Women, Abuse and the Bible (1996), I suffer not a Woman (1998)
- Gordon Fee, contributing editor to Discovering Biblical Equality (2004)
- George Fox
- Kevin Giles, vicar of St. Michael's Church in North Carlton, Australia, in the Anglican Church of Australia; author of Jesus and the Father: Modern Evangelicals Reinvent the Doctrine of the Trinity (2006)
- Stanley Grenz, author of Women in the Church (1995)
- Mimi Haddad, President of CBE International, (2009-present), adjunct associate professor of historical theology at Fuller Theological Seminary; co-author of Is Gender Equality a Biblical Ideal? (2015), editor and contributing author of Global Voices on Biblical Equality: Women and Men Serving Together in the Church (2008)
- Trevor Huddleston
- Eddie L. Hyatt, D.Min., author of Paul, Women and the Church (2016)
- Craig S. Keener, author of Paul, Women and Wives (1992)
- Paul King Jewett, author of Man as Male and Female (1975) and The Ordination of Women (1980)
- I. Howard Marshall, New Testament scholar and Professor of New Testament exegesis at The University of Aberdeen
- Scot McKnight, Karl A. Olsson professor in religious studies at North Park University; author of The Blue Parakeet: Rethinking How you Read the Bible (2008)
- Roger Nicole, emeritus professor of theology at Reformed Theological Seminary, Orlando, Florida.
- Roger Olson, professor of theology at George W. Truett Theological Seminary of Baylor University
- Carroll D. Osburn, professor of New Testament language and literature at Abilene Christian University; author of Women in the Church: Reclaiming the Ideal (2001)
- Joseph Parker, author of The People's Bible
- Frank Stagg, co-author of Woman in the World of Jesus (1978)
- William J. Webb, author of Slaves, Women and Homosexuals (2001)
- Ben Witherington III, professor of New Testament interpretation at Asbury Theological Seminary; author of Women in the Earliest Churches (1988) and Women and the Genesis of Christianity (1990)
- N.T. Wright, English New Testament scholar, Pauline theologian, and Anglican bishop

== See also ==
- Catharism
- Christian feminism
- Christian views on marriage
- Christians for Biblical Equality, an egalitarian organization
- Council on Biblical Manhood and Womanhood, a complementarian organization
- Evangelical and Ecumenical Women's Caucus
- New feminism
- Ordination of women
- Quaker views on women
- Women in Christianity
