= Textual variants in the Book of Judges =

Differences in Book of Judges manuscripts

Textual variants in the Book of Judges concerns textual variants in the Hebrew Bible found in the Book of Judges.

== Legend ==
Purported inter-relationship between significant ancient Old Testament manuscripts (some identified by their siglum).

Frequently used sigla (symbols and abbreviations) of Hebrew Bible manuscripts and editions include:

א: Codex Sinaiticus
A: Codex Alexandrinus
B: Codex Vaticanus (Roman Septuagint)
C: Codex Ephraemi Rescriptus
ABP: Apostolic Bible Polyglot
AC: Aleppo Codex
BHS: Biblia Hebraica Stuttgartensia
Brenton: Brenton's Septuagint Translation 1879
LC: Leningrad Codex
LXX: Septuagint (list)
LXX^{Rahlfs}: Rahlfs' Septuagint 1935
LXX^{Swete}: Swete's Septuagint 1930
K: ketiv
Kennicott^{x}: Kennicott's Vetus Test. Hebraicum
MAM: Miqra according to the Masorah
m.: Mishna
MT or 𝕸: Masoretic Text
MT^{Ginsburg}: C.D. Ginsburg's Masoretic Text
OL or: Old Latin / Vetus Latina (list)
Q: qere
xQx: Dead Sea Scrolls (list)
S: Peshitta
SP: Samaritan Pentateuch
Tg: Targum
Tg^{Be}: Targum Berlin Orientalis 1213
Tg^{J}: Targum Jonathan
Tg^{O}: Targum Onqelos
Tg^{N}: Targum Neofiti
Tg^{PJ}: Targum Pseudo-Jonathan
Vg: Vulgate (list)
Vg^{Clement}: Clementine Vulgate 1592
Vg^{Colunga&Turrado}: A. Colunga & L. Turrado's Vulgata 1946
Vg^{neo}: Nova Vulgata 1979
WLC: Westminster Leningrad Codex

== List ==
This list provides examples of known textual variants, and contains the following parameters: Hebrew texts written right to left, the Hebrew text romanised left to right, an approximate English translation, and in which Hebrew manuscripts or critical editions of the Hebrew Bible this textual variant can be found. Greek (Septuagint) and Latin (Vulgate) texts are written left to right, and not romanised. Sometimes additional translation or interpretation notes are added, with references to similar verses elsewhere, or in-depth articles on the topic in question.

=== Judges 1 ===
Judges 1:18

Tischendorf's 1880 edition of the Septuagint, with Judges 1:18 stating that Judah did not 'inherit' Gaza, Ashkelon, Ekron nor Ashdod (Note: καὶ οὐκ ἐκληρονόμησεν Ἰούδας τὴν Γάζαν οὐδὲ τὰ ὅρια αὐτῆς, οὐδὲ τὴν Ἀσκάλωνα οὐδὲ τὰ ὅρια αὐτῆς, οὐδὲ τὴν Ἀκκαρὼν οὐδὲ τὰ ὅρια αὐτῆς, οὐδὲ τὴν Ἄζωτον οὐδὲ τὰ περισπόρια αὐτῆς. (Swete's Septuagint). The word 'οὐκ' means "not", 'ἐκληρονόμησεν' (related to the modern Greek verb κληρονομώ) means "inherit", and 'οὐδὲ' means "nor".)

According to the Hebrew Masoretic Text (MT) of Judges 1:18, "Also Judah took Gaza with the coast thereof, and Askelon with the coast thereof, and Ekron with the coast thereof." (King James Version). (Note: וַיִּלְכֹּ֤ד יְהוּדָה֙ אֶת־עַזָּ֣ה וְאֶת־גְּבוּלָ֔הּ וְאֶֽת־אַשְׁקְלֹ֖ון וְאֶת־גְּבוּלָ֑הּ וְאֶת־עֶקְרֹ֖ון וְאֶת־גְּבוּלָֽהּ׃. (Westminster Leningrad Codex).) However, the Greek Septuagint (LXX) renders Judges 1:18 as: "But Judas did not inherit Gaza nor her coasts, nor Ascalon nor her coasts, nor Accaron nor her coasts, nor Azotus nor the lands around it.' (Brenton's Septuagint Translation).

This contradiction has puzzled scholars, as not only does the Greek text add Ashdod (Azotus) to the list of cities, but it specifically denies that the Judahites conquered (literally "inherited") these cities, while the Hebrew text asserts that they did. Although English Bible translations have generally followed the Masoretic Text in saying the Judahites took the three cities, some scholars claim that the Greek version should be regarded as superior if the inhabitants of these four coastal cities are to be equated with "the people of the plains" in the next verse, who repelled the Judahites thanks to their iron chariots. The Septuagint may therefore 'correct' the Hebrew text, as other textual evidence also seems to indicate the towns did not fall to the Israelites until much later. Charles Ellicott noted that Josephus had a different solution, claiming in Antiquities of the Jews (volume 2, paragraph 4) that 'Askelon and Ashdod were taken in the war, but that Gaza and Ekron escaped, because their situation in the plains enabled them to use their chariots; yet in 3, § 1, he says that the Canaanites re-conquered Askelon and Ekron.'

=== Judges 15 ===
Judges 15:5

וַיַּבְעֶר־אֵשׁ֙ בַּלַּפִּידִ֔ים, way-yaḇ-‘er-’êš bal-lap-pî-ḏîm,, 'And [when he] had burnt fire on the torches / set the torches on fire' – WLC
καὶ ἐξέκαυσεν πῦρ ἐν ταῖς λαμπάσιν, 'and he inflamed/kindled fire in the torches/lamps' – LXX^{Swete} APB

=== Judges 18 ===
Judges 18:7

מִצִּ֣דֹנִ֔ים וְדָבָ֥ר אֵין־ לָהֶ֖ם עִם־ אָדָֽם׃, miṣ·ṣi·ḏō·nîm, wə·ḏā·ḇār ’ên-lā·hem ‘im-’ā·ḏām., 'from the Sidonians, and [there were] no ties/dealings/word with anyone / any man.' – WLC
Σιδωνίων, καὶ λόγον οὐκ ἔχουσιν πρὸς ἄνθρωπον., 'of the Sidonians, and no word was had/held to anyone / any man' – B LXX^{Swete} LXX^{Rahlfs} Brenton (ἔχουσι)
Σιδωνιων και..., 'from the Sidonians and had no relationship with the Arameans' – LXX^{mss}
από Σιδώνος και λόγος ουκ ην αυτοίς μετά Συρίας, '[away] from Sidon, and there was no word to them with Syria' – A APB
et procul a Sidone atque a cunctis hominibus separatum., 'and far away from Sidon and separated from all men/people.' Vg^{Colunga&Turrado}

See also Dan (ancient city) § Laish.

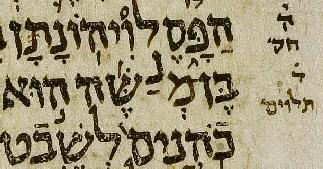
The superscripted נַ in Judges 18:30 on the name "Manasseh" in the Aleppo Codex

Judges 18:30

וִ֠יהֹונָתָן בֶּן־ גֵּרְשֹׁ֨ם בֶּן־ מְשֶּׁ֜ה, wî-hō-w-nā-ṯān ben-gê-rə-šōm ben-mō-šeh, 'and Jonathan the son of Gershom the son of Moses' – 'many Hebrew manuscripts, some Septuagint manuscripts and Vulgate'.
וִ֠יהֹונָתָן בֶּן־ גֵּרְשֹׁ֨ם בֶּן־ מְנַשֶּׁ֜ה, wî-hō-w-nā-ṯān ben-gê-rə-šōm ben-mə-naš-šeh, 'and Jonathan the son of Gershom the son of Manasseh' – 'many other Hebrew manuscripts and some other Septuagint manuscripts'
καὶ Ἰωναθὰμ υἱὸς Γηρσὸμ υἱὸς Μανασσή, 'and Jonatham, son Gersom, son Manasse' – LXX^{Swete}
και Ιωνάθαν υιός Γηρσών υιόυ Μανασσή, 'and Jonathan, son of the Gersoms of the son Manasse' – APB

"Moses" (משה) is thought to be the original reading, which was later changed to "Manasseh" in some manuscripts (but not all) by adding a nun in superscript (מ^{נ}שה), in order 'to avoid saying that the grandson of Moses became a priest of false gods'.
See also Judges 18 § Verse 30 and Gershom § Priestly connections.

=== Judges 19 ===
Judges 19:2, see also Levite's concubine

וַתִּזְנֶ֤ה עָלָיו֙ פִּֽילַגְשֹׁ֔ו wat-tiz-neh ‘ā-lāw pî-laḡ-šōw, (But his concubine was unfaithful to him, or But his concubine played the harlot against him, or But his concubine was angry at him,) – WLC

It is disputed whether the first word is derived from זנה zaná (H2181 "to commit fornication/adultery/harlotry, to be a harlot, to play the harlot, to prostitute"), or זנח zanákh (H2186 "to reject, spurn, be angry with/at, cast away (off), remove far away (off), desert"). Traditionally, translators and interpreters have followed the former verb, but some modern scholars prefer the latter verb because this meaning aligns much better with the Greek texts.

καὶ ἐπορεύθη ἀπ᾽ αὐτοῦ ἡ παλλακὴ αὐτοῦ (And his concubine departed from him) – LXX^{Swete} Brenton
και ωργίσθη αυτώ η παλλακή αυτού (And his concubine provoked him to anger) – ABP
quæ reliquit eum, 'who left him' – Vg^{Clement} Vg^{Colunga&Turrado}

Judges 19:2, see also Levite's concubine

καὶ ἀπῆλθεν παρ᾽ αὐτοῦ εἰς οἶκον πατρὸς αὐτῆς (and went away from him to the house of her father) – LXX^{Swete}
καὶ ἀπῆλθε παρ᾽ αὐτοῦ εἰς οἶκον πατρὸς αὐτῆς (and went away from him to the house of her father) – Brenton
και απήλθε απ' αυτού εις τον οίκον του πατρός αυτής (and she went forth from him unto the house of her father) – ABP
et reversa est in domum patris sui, 'and [has] returned to the house of her father' – Vg^{Clement} Vg^{Colunga&Turrado}

Judges 19:2, see also Levite's concubine

וַתְּהִי־שָׁ֕ם יָמִ֖ים אַרְבָּעָ֥ה חֳדָשִֽׁים׃ wat-tə-hî- šām yā-mîm ’ar-bā-‘āh ḥo-ḏā-šîm. (and was there the days of four months) – WLC
καὶ ἦν ἐκεῖ ἡμέρας δ᾽ μηνῶν (and [she] was there days and months) – LXX^{Swete}
καὶ ἦν ἐκεῖ ἡμέρας μηνῶν τεσσαρων (and she was there four months) – Brenton
και εγένετο εκεί ημέρας τετράμηνον (and she was there the days of four months) – ABP
mansitque apud eum quatuor mensibus, 'and she [has] remained near him / at his place during four months' – Vg^{Clement} Vg^{Colunga&Turrado}

Judges 19:3, see also Levite's concubine

ὀπίσω (after) – LXX^{Swete} Brenton
κατόπισθεν (after or behind) – ABP
Secutusque est, 'And [he has] followed' – Vg^{Clement} Vg^{Colunga&Turrado}

Judges 19:3, see also Levite's concubine

τοῦ λαλῆσαι ἐπὶ καρδίαν αὐτῆς (to speak unto her heart) – LXX^{Swete} Brenton
του λαλήσαι επί την καρδίαν αυτής (to speak unto the heart of her) – ABP
volens reconciliari ei, atque blandiri, 'wanting to reconcile [her] to him, and to flatter [her]' – Vg^{Clement} Vg^{Colunga&Turrado}

Judges 19:3, see also Levite's concubine

לַהֲשִׁיבֹו la-hă-šî-ḇōw, ([and] bring him back) – K
לַהֲשִׁיבָ֔הּ la-hă-šî-ḇāh, ([and] bring her back) – Q
τοῦ ἐπιστρέψαι αὐτὴν αὐτῷ (to turn her over to him) – LXX^{Swete} Brenton. ἐπιστρέψαι is a probable misspelling of ἐπιτρέπω
του διαλλάξαι αυτήν (to reconcile her or to change her mind) – ABP
et secum reducere, 'and to return [her] to him' – Vg^{Clement} Vg^{Colunga&Turrado}

Judges 19:3, see also Levite's concubine

וְנַעֲרֹ֥ו עִמֹּ֖ו וְצֶ֣מֶד חֲמֹרִ֑ים wə-na-‘ă-rōw ‘im-mōw wə-ṣe-meḏ ḥă-mō-rîm; (and [having his] young man/boy/servant with [him] and a pair of donkeys) – WLC
καὶ νεανίας αὐτοῦ μετ᾽ αὐτοῦ καὶ ζεῦγος ὄνων. (And his young man [was] with him and a pair of donkeys or and he had his young man with him, and a pair of asses) – LXX^{Swete} Brenton
και το παιδάριον αυτού μετ᾽ αυτού καὶ ζεύγος υποζυγίων. (And his little boy [was] with him and a pair of beasts of burden) – ABP
habens in comitatu puerum et duos asinos:, 'having a boy and two donkeys in his company:' – Vg^{Clement} Vg^{Colunga&Turrado}

Judges 19:3, see also Levite's concubine

καὶ ἥδε εἰσήνεγκεν αὐτὸν εἰς οἶκον (and she brought him into the house) – LXX^{Swete} Brenton. εἰσήνεγκεν = εἰς ("into" or "to(wards)") + φέρω ("to bring") aorist third person singular
και επορεύθη έως οίκου (and he went/travelled unto/until the house) – ABP
quæ suscepit eum, et introduxit in domum patris sui, 'who received him, and introduced [him] into her father's house' – Vg^{Clement} Vg^{Colunga&Turrado}

Judges 19:4, see also Levite's concubine

וַיֶּחֱזַק־ בּ֤וֹ way-ye-ḥĕ-zaq- bōw (detained/restrained him or persuaded him to stay) – WLC
κατέσχεν αὐτὸν (constrained him) – LXX^{Swete} Brenton
εισήγαγεν αυτόν (brought him in) – ABP
amplexatus est hominem, 'embraced the man' – Vg^{Clement} Vg^{Colunga&Turrado}

Judges 19:4, see also Levite's concubine

ἐπὶ (for or during) – LXX^{Swete} Brenton
omitted – WLC ABP Vg^{Clement} Vg^{Colunga&Turrado}

Judges 19:4, see also Levite's concubine

וַיָּלִ֖ינוּ way-yā-lî-nū ([they] lodged) – WLC
ηὐλίσθησαν ([they] spent the night or lodged) – LXX^{Swete} Brenton
ύπνωσαν ([they] slept) – ABP
omitted – Vg^{Clement} Vg^{Colunga&Turrado}

Judges 19:18, see also Levite's concubine

וְאֶת־בֵּ֤ית יְהוָה֙ אֲנִ֣י הֹלֵ֔ךְ wə-’eṯ- bêṯ Yah-weh ’ă-nî hō-lêḵ, (and [now] to the house of Yahweh I am going) – WLC Syriac Targum
καὶ εἰς τὸν οἶκόν μου ἐγὼ πορεύομαι· (and to my house I am walking) – LXX^{Swete} Brenton
και εις τον οίκον μου εγώ αποτρέχω (and to my house I am returning) – ABP. αποτρέχω is a probable misspelling of wikt:ἀποτρέπω
et nunc vadimus ad domum Dei, 'and now we are going to the house of God' – Vg^{Clement} Vg^{Colunga&Turrado}

Judges 19:24, see also Levite's concubine

הִנֵּה֩ בִתִּ֨י הַבְּתוּלָ֜ה hin-nêh ḇit-tî hab-bə-ṯū-lāh (Behold my virgin daughter) – WLC
ἴδε ἡ θυγάτηρ μου ἡ παρθένος (Behold [singular] the daughter of mine, the virgin) – LXX^{Swete} Brenton
ιδού θυγάτηρ μου η παρθένος (Behold [plural] my daughter, the virgin) – ABP
Habeo filiam virginem, 'I have a virgin daughter' – Vg^{Clement} Vg^{Colunga&Turrado}

Judges 19:24, see also Levite's concubine

אֹוצִֽיאָה־נָּ֤א אֹותָם֙ וְעַנּ֣וּ אֹותָ֔ם ’ō-w-ṣî-’āh- nā wə-‘an-nū ’ō-w-ṯām, (Let me bring them out now, and you rape/force [sexually]/defile/violate/ravish/mistreat/humble/humiliate them) – WLC
ἐξάξω αὐτάς, καὶ ταπεινώσατε αὐτὰς (And I will bring them out, and you humble/humiliate them,) – LXX^{Swete} Brenton ABP
educam eas ad vos, ut humilietis eas, 'I will lead them out to you, so that you humiliate them' – Vg^{Clement} Vg^{Colunga&Turrado}

Judges 19:24, see also Levite's concubine

וְלָאִ֤ישׁ הַזֶּה֙ לֹ֣א תַעֲשׂ֔וּ דְּבַ֖ר הַנְּבָלָ֥ה הַזֹּֽאת׃ wə-lā-’îš haz-zeh lō ṯa-‘ă-śū, də-ḇar han-nə-ḇā-lāh haz-zōṯ. (but unto this man do not so vile a thing (KJV) or but to this man do not commit this rape/folly/villainy/foolishness or vile/disgraceful act/thing/outrage) WLC
καὶ τῷ ἀνδρὶ τούτῳ οὐ ποιήσετε τὸ ῥῆμα τῆς ἀφροσύνης ταύτης. (but to this man you do not do this folly) – LXX^{Swete}
και τω ανδρί τούτω μη ποιήσητε το ρήμα της αφροσύνης ταύτης. (but to this man you should not do the thing of this folly or but to this man do not this folly) – Brenton ABP
ne scelus hoc contra naturam operemini in virum., 'do not work this crime against nature on a man.' – Vg^{Clement} Vg^{Colunga&Turrado}

Judges 19:25, see also Levite's concubine

וַיֵּדְע֣וּ אֹ֠ותָהּ וַיִּֽתְעַלְּלוּ־בָ֤הּ כָּל־הַלַּ֙יְלָה֙ עַד־הַבֹּ֔קֶר way-yê-ḏə-‘ū ’ō-w-ṯāh way-yiṯ-‘al-lə-lū- ḇāh kāl- hal-lay-lāh ‘aḏ- hab-bō-qer, (And they knew / had sexual relations with / raped her, and they mocked//abused/dealt severely with her the entire night until morning) – WLC
καὶ ἔγνωσαν αὐτήν, καὶ ἐνέπαιζον ἐν αὐτῇ ὅλην τὴν νύκτα ἕως πρωί (And they knew / had sex with / raped her, and they mocked/ridiculed/abused her the entire night until morning) – LXX^{Swete}
καὶ ἔγνωσαν αὐτήν, καὶ ἐνέπαιζον ἐν αὐτῇ ὅλην τὴν νύκτα ἕως τοπρωί (And they knew / had sex with / raped her, and they mocked/ridiculed/abused her the entire night until the morning) – Brenton
και έγνωσαν αυτήν και ενέπαιξαν αυτή όλην την νύκτα έως τοπρωϊ (And they knew / had sex with / raped her and mocked/ridiculed/abused her the entire night until the morning) – ABP
qua cum tota nocte abusi essent,, 'and when she had been abused all night,' – Vg^{Clement} Vg^{Colunga&Turrado}

Judges 19:25, see also Levite's concubine

וַֽיְשַׁלְּח֖וּהָ בעלות הַשָּֽׁחַר׃ way-šal-lə-ḥū-hā ba-‘ă-lō-wṯ haš-šā-ḥar. (and when they let her go, the day began to spring.) – K
וַֽיְשַׁלְּח֖וּהָ כַּעֲלֹ֥ות הַשָּֽׁחַר׃ way-šal-lə-ḥū-hā ka-‘ă-lō-wṯ haš-šā-ḥar. (and when they let her go, the day began to break.) – Q
καὶ ἐξαπέστειλαν αὐτὴν ὡς ἀνέβη τὸ πρωί. (and let her go when the morning dawned.) – LXX^{Swete} Brenton
και εξαπέστειλαν αυτήν άμα τω ανέβη τον όρθρον (and they sent her away at the same time the daybreak ascended.) – ABP
dimiserunt eam mane., 'they let her go in the morning.' – Vg^{Clement} Vg^{Colunga&Turrado}

Judges 19:28, see also Levite's concubine

וַיֹּ֧אמֶר אֵלֶ֛יהָ way-yō-mer ’ê-le-hā (And he said to her) – WLC
καὶ εἶπεν πρὸς αὐτήν (And he said to her) – LXX^{Swete}
και είπε προς αυτήν (And he said to her) – Brenton ABP
Cui ille, putans eam quiescere, loquebatur:, 'To whom he, believing her to be resting/asleep, said:' – Vg^{Clement} Vg^{Colunga&Turrado}

Judges 19:28, see also Levite's concubine

וְאֵ֣ין עֹנֶ֑ה wə-’ên ‘ō-neh; (But [she] did not answer.) – WLC
καὶ οὐκ ἀπεκρίθη, ὅτι ἦν νεκρά. (And she did not answer, because she was dead.) – LXX^{Swete} Brenton
και ουκ απεκρίθη αυτώ αλλά τεθνήκει (And she did not answer to him, for she had died) – ABP Brenton
Qua nihil respondente, intelligens quod erat mortua, 'As she was responding nothing, understanding that she was dead' – Vg^{Clement} Vg^{Colunga&Turrado}

Judges 19:28, see also Levite's concubine

τὸν ὄνον (the donkey) – LXX^{Swete} Brenton
το υποζύγιον (the beast of burden) – ABP

Judges 19:29, see also Levite's concubine

וַיָּבֹ֣א אֶל־בֵּ way-yā-ḇō ’el- bê-ṯōw, (And when he entered into his house) – WLC
και εισήλθεν εις τον οίκον αυτού (And he entered into his house) – ABP
Quam cum esset ingressus, 'When he had entered' – Vg^{Clement} Vg^{Colunga&Turrado}
omitted – LXX^{Swete} Brenton

Judges 19:29, see also Levite's concubine

הַֽמַּאֲכֶ֙לֶת֙ ham-ma-’ă-ḵe-leṯ (a knife) – WLC. A מאכלת (ma'akhélet) was a "knife for slaughtering, butchering, carving"
τὴν ῥομφαίαν (a rhomphaia or his sword) – LXX^{Swete} Brenton
την μάχαιραν (a makhaira or the knife) – ABP
gladium, 'a gladius or a sword' – Vg^{Clement} Vg^{Colunga&Turrado}

Judges 19:29, see also Levite's concubine

ἐκράτησεν (seized) – LXX^{Swete}
ἐκράτησε (seized) – Brenton
επελάβετο (took hold of) – ABP

Judges 19:29, see also Levite's concubine

לַעֲצָמֶ֔יהָ la-‘ă-ṣā-me-hā, (limb by limb) – WLC
κατά τα όστα αυτής (according to her bones) – ABP
cum ossibus suis, '(along) with her bones' – Vg^{Clement} Vg^{Colunga&Turrado}
omitted – LXX^{Swete} Brenton

Judges 19:29, see also Levite's concubine

בְּכֹ֖ל גְּב֥וּל יִשְׂרָאֵֽל׃ bə-ḵōl gə-ḇūl yiś-rā-’êl. (throughout the territory of Israel) – WLC
ἐν παντὶ ὁρίῳ Ἰσραήλ (to all borders of Israel or to every coast of Israel) – LXX^{Swete} Brenton
εις πάσας τας φυλάς Ισραήλ (to all the tribes of Israel) – ABP
in omnes terminos Israel, 'to all the borders of Israel' – Vg^{Clement} Vg^{Colunga&Turrado}

=== Judges 20 ===
Judges 20:03, see also Levite's concubine

וַיֹּֽאמְרוּ֙, way-yō-mə-rū, 'and said' – WLC
καὶ ἐλθόντες εἶπαν, 'and the arriving said' – LXX^{Swete} Brenton
και είπαν, 'and said' – ABP
Interrogatusque, 'And when he was questioned' – Vg^{Clement} Vg^{Colunga&Turrado}

Judges 20:05, see also Levite's concubine

אֹותִי֙ דִּמּ֣וּ לַהֲרֹ֔ג, ’ō-w-ṯî dim-mū la-hă-rōḡ,, 'they planned/intended to kill me' – WLC
ἐμὲ ἠθέλησαν φονεῦσαι, 'they wanted to murder/slay me' – LXX^{Swete} Brenton
εμέ ηθέλησαν αποκτείναι, 'they wanted to kill me' – ABP
volentes me occidere, 'wanting to kill me' – Vg^{Clement} Vg^{Colunga&Turrado}

Judges 20:05, see also Levite's concubine

וְאֶת־פִּילַגְשִׁ֥י עִנּ֖וּ וַתָּמֹֽת׃, wə-’eṯ- pî-laḡ-šî ‘in-nū wat-tā-mōṯ., 'and / but instead they raped/[sexually] forced/defiled/violated/ravished/mistreated/humbled/humiliated my concubine, and she died' – WLC
καὶ τὴν παλλακήν μου ἐταπείνωσαν, καὶ ἀπέθανεν., 'and they humiliated my concubine, and she died.' – LXX^{Swete}
καὶ τὴν παλλακήν μου ἐταπείνωσαν, καὶ ἀπέθανε., 'and they humiliated my concubine, and she died.' – Brenton
και την παλλακήν μου εταπείνωσαν και ενέπαιξαν αυτή και απέθανεν., 'and they humiliated my concubine, and they mocked/ridiculed/abused her, and she died.' – ABP
et uxorem meam incredibili furore libidinis vexantes, denique mortua est., 'and tormenting my wife with an incredible fury of lust, she (has) finally died.' – Vg^{Clement} Vg^{Colunga&Turrado}

=== Judges 21 ===
Judges 21:10, see also Levite's concubine

וְהַנָּשִׁ֖ים וְהַטָּֽף׃, wə-han-nā-šîm wə-haṭ-ṭāp̄., 'and [even] the women and the children.' – WLC
και τας γυναίκας και τον λαόν, 'even the women and the people!' – ABP
tam uxores quam parvulos eorum., 'both their wives and their little ones.' – Vg^{Colunga&Turrado}
omitted – LXX^{Swete} Brenton

Judges 21:11, see also Levite's concubine

וְזֶ֥ה הַדָּבָ֖ר אֲשֶׁ֣ר תַּעֲשׂ֑וּ, wə-zeh had-dā-ḇār ’ă-šer ta-‘ă-śū;, 'And this word you shall do:' – WLC
καὶ τοῦτο ποιήσετε·, 'And this you shall do:' – LXX^{Swete} Brenton
και ούτος ο λόγος ον ποιήσετε, 'And this [is] the word which you shall do' – ABP
Et hoc erit quod observare debebitis, 'And this will be what you will have to observe' – Vg^{Colunga&Turrado}

Judges 21:11, see also Levite's concubine

כָּל־זָכָ֗ר וְכָל־אִשָּׁ֛ה יֹדַ֥עַת מִשְׁכַּב־זָכָ֖ר תַּחֲרִֽימוּ׃, kāl- zā-ḵār, wə-ḵāl ’iš-šāh yō-ḏa-‘aṯ miš-kaḇ- zā-ḵār ta-ḥă-rî-mū., 'any male and any woman who has known the bed of a male you shall destroy/devote.' – WLC
πᾶν ἄρσεν καὶ πᾶσαν γυναῖκα εἰδυῖαν κοίτην ἄρσενος ἀναθεματιεῖτε,, 'Every male and every female having known the marriage-bed of a man you shall devote [to destruction],' – LXX^{Swete} Brenton
παν αρσενικόν και πάσαν γυναίκα γινώσκουσαν κοίτην άρσενος αναθεματιείτε, 'Every male and every woman knowning the marriage-bed of a man you shall devote to consumption.' – ABP
omne generis masculini, et mulieres quae cognoverunt viros, interficite;, 'every kind of male, and women who have known men, kill;' – Vg^{Colunga&Turrado}

Compare Numbers 31:17.

Judges 21:11, see also Levite's concubine

, τὰς δὲ παρθένους περιποιήσεσθε. καὶ ἐποίησαν οὕτως·, ', but take care of the virgins. And they did so;' – LXX^{Swete}
· τὰς δὲ παρθένους περιποιήσεσθε· καὶ ἐποίησαν οὕτως., '; but the virgins ye shall save alive: and they did so.' – Brenton
; virgines autem reservate., '; but save the virgins.' – Vg^{Colunga&Turrado}
omitted – WLC ABP

Compare Numbers 31:18.

Judges 21:12, see also Levite's concubine

נַעֲרָ֣ה בְתוּלָ֔ה אֲשֶׁ֧ר לֹֽא־יָדְעָ֛ה אִ֖ישׁ לְמִשְׁכַּ֣ב זָכָ֑ר, na-‘ă-rāh ḇə-ṯū-lāh, ’ă-šer lō- yā-ḏə-‘āh ’îš lə-miš-kaḇ zā-ḵār;, 'virgin young woman, who has not known a man on/in the bed of a male;' – WLC
νεάνιδας παρθένους, αἵτινες οὐκ ἔγνωσαν ἄνδρα εἰς κοίτην ἄρσενος,, 'virgin young women, whoever knew not a man, into the marriage-bed of a male.' – LXX^{Swete} Brenton
νεάνιδας παρθένους αι οὐκ έγνωσαν άνδρα εις κοίτην άρσενος, 'virgin young women, the ones [that] knew not a man, in the marriage-bed of a male.' – ABP
virgines, quae nescierunt viri thorum:, 'virgins, who did not know the marriage-bed of a man:' – Vg^{Colunga&Turrado}

Judges 21:12, see also Levite's concubine

שִׁלֹ֔ה אֲשֶׁ֖ר, ši-lōh, ’ă-šer, 'Shiloh which [is]' – WLC
Σηλὼν τὴν, 'Selon the [one]' – LXX^{Swete}
Σηλὼμ τὴν, 'Selom the [one]' – Brenton
Σηλώ η εστιν, 'Selo which is' – ABP
Silo, 'Silo' – Vg^{Colunga&Turrado}

Judges 21:14, see also Levite's concubine

וַיָּ֤שָׁב בִּנְיָמִן֙ בָּעֵ֣ת, way-yā-šāḇ bin-yā-min bā-‘êṯ, 'And Benjamin returned at that time' – WLC
καὶ ἐπέστρεψεν βενιαμεὶν πρὸς τοὺς υἱοὺς Ἰσραὴλ ἐν τῷ καιρῷ ἐκείνῳ, 'And Benjamin returned to the sons of Israel at that time' – LXX^{Swete} Brenton ABP
Veneruntque filii Benjamin in illo tempore, 'And the sons of Benjamin came at that time' – Vg^{Colunga&Turrado}

Judges 21:14, see also Levite's concubine

הַהִ֔יא וַיִּתְּנ֤וּ לָהֶם֙, ha-hî way-yit-tə-nū lā-hem, 'and they gave them' – WLC
καὶ ἔδωκαν αὐτοῖς οἱ υἱοὶ Ἰσραὴλ, 'and the sons of Israel gave them' – LXX^{Swete} Brenton
και έδωκαν αυτοίς, 'and [they] gave them' – ABP
et datae sunt eis, 'and to them were given' – Vg^{Colunga&Turrado}

Judges 21:14, see also Levite's concubine

הַנָּשִׁ֔ים אֲשֶׁ֣ר חִיּ֔וּ מִנְּשֵׁ֖י יָבֵ֣שׁ גִּלְעָ֑ד, han-nā-šîm, ’ă-šer ḥî-yū, min-nə-šê yā-ḇêš gil-‘āḏ;, 'the women, whom they had kept/saved alive, from the women of Jabesh Gilead;' – WLC
τὰς γυναῖκας ἃς ἐζωοποίησαν ἀπὸ τῶν θυγατέρων Ἰαβεὶς Γαλαάδ·, 'the women whom they saved alive from the daughters of Jabeis Galaad' – LXX^{Swete}
τὰς γυναῖκας ἃς ἐζωοποίησαν ἀπὸ τῶν θυγατέρων Ἰαβὶς Γαλαάδ·, 'the women whom they [had] saved alive of the daughters of Jabis Galaad' – Brenton
τας γυναίκας αίτινες ήσαν εκ των γυναικών Ιαβίς Γαλαάδ, 'the women whomever were of the women of Jabis Galaad' – ABP
uxores de filiabus Jabes Galaad:, '(the) wives of/from (the) daughters of Jabes Galaad:' – Vg^{Colunga&Turrado}

Judges 21:14, see also Levite's concubine

וְלֹֽא־מָצְא֥וּ לָהֶ֖ם כֵּֽן׃, wə-lō- mā-ṣə-’ū lā-hem kên., 'but [they] had not found enough for them.' – WLC
καὶ ἤρεσεν αὐτοῖς οὕτως., 'and it pleased them thus' – LXX^{Swete} Brenton ABP
καὶ ἤρεσεν αὐτοῖς οὕτω., 'and they were content' – Brenton
alias autem non repererunt, quas simili modo traderent., 'but [they] did not find others, whom [they] would deliver in (a) similar manner.' – Vg^{Colunga&Turrado}

Judges 21:17, see also Levite's concubine

לֹֽא־יִמָּחֶ֥ה שֵׁ֖בֶט מִיִּשְׂרָאֵֽל׃, lō- yim-mā-ḥeh šê-ḇeṭ mî-yiś-rā-’êl., 'a tribe may not be destroyed from Israel.' – WLC
οὐκ ἐξαλειφθήσεται φυλὴ ἀπὸ Ἰσραήλ., 'no tribe will be wiped away from Israel.' – LXX^{Swete} Brenton
ου μη εξαλειφθή φυλή εξ Ισραήλ, 'in no way should a tribe be wiped away out of Israel' – ABP
ne una tribus deleatur ex Israel, 'lest one tribe be destroyed/deleted from Israel' – Vg^{Colunga&Turrado}

Judges 21:22, see also Levite's concubine

לרוב, lā-rō-wḇ, 'to complain' – K
לָרִ֣יב ׀, lā-rîḇ, 'to complain' – Q

Judges 21:22, see also Levite's concubine

אֵלֵ֗ינוּ, ’ê-lê-nū,, 'to us' – WLC
πρὸς ὑμᾶς, 'to you' – LXX^{Swete}
πρὸς ημάς, 'to us' – Brenton ABP
adversum vos, 'against you' – Vg^{Colunga&Turrado}

Judges 21:22, see also Levite's concubine

חָנּ֣וּנוּ אֹותָ֔ם כִּ֣י לֹ֥א לָקַ֛חְנוּ אִ֥ישׁ אִשְׁתֹּ֖ו בַּמִּלְחָמָ֑ה, ḥān-nū-nū ’ō-w-ṯām, kî lō lā-qaḥ-nū ’îš ’iš-tōw bam-mil-ḥā-māh;, 'Be kind to them, because we did not take a woman/wife for [each] man in the war' – WLC
Ἔλεος ποιήσατε ἡμῖν αὐτάς, ὅτι οὐκ ἐλάβομεν ἀνὴρ γυναῖκα αὐτοῦ ἐν τῇ παρατάξει, 'Grant them to us out of mercy, for we have not taken every man a woman/wife for himself in the lines of battle' – LXX^{Swete} Brenton
ελεήσατε αυτούς ότι ουκ έλαβεν ανήρ εαυτώ γυναίκα εν τω πολέμω, 'Show mercy on them! For a man did not take a woman/wife to himself in the war' – ABP
Miseremini eorum: non enim rapuerunt eas jure bellantium atque victorum:, 'Have mercy on them: for [they] did not seize/abduct/rape them by (the) right of warriors and conquerors.' – Vg^{Colunga&Turrado}

Judges 21:25

בְּעֵינָ֖יו, bə-‘ê-nāw, 'in [his] eyes' – WLC
ἐνώπιον αὐτοῦ, 'in his face/view or in front of him' – LXX^{Swete} Brenton
εν οφθαλμοίς αυτού, 'in his eyes' – ABP
sibi videbatur, 'it seemed to him' – Vg^{Colunga&Turrado}

== See also ==
- List of Hebrew Bible manuscripts

== Bibliography ==
- Biblos.com & Helps Ministries (2011–2018). "Interlinear Bible (Westminster Leningrad Codex – English)". Biblehub.com.
- Brenton, Lancelot Charles Lee (1851). "Brenton's Septuagint Translation". Biblehub.com.
- Brenton, Lancelot Charles Lee (1879). The Septuagint version of the OT, with an English translation (PDF). London: Samuel Bagster. p. 1156.
- Rahlfs, Alfred (1935). "Κριταί (Βατικανός Κώδικας) (Judges Codex Vaticanus Rahlfs)". Alfred Rahlfs' edition of the Septuagint (in Greek). Greek Wikisource.
- Scholz, Susanne (2021). Sacred Witness. Rape in the Hebrew Bible. Fortress Press. ISBN 9781506482033. (E-book edition)
- Swete, Henry Barclay (1930). "Swete's Septuagint". Biblehub.com.
- Emanuel Tov, The Text-Critical Use of the Septuagint in Biblical Research (TCU), 1981 (1st edition), 1997 (2nd edition), 2015 (3rd edition).
- Emanuel Tov, Textual Criticism of the Hebrew Bible (TCHB), 1992 (1st edition), 2001 (2nd edition), 2012 (3rd edition).
- Emanuel Tov, Textual Criticism of the Hebrew Bible, Qumran, Septuagint: Collected Writings, Volume 3 (2015).
- Tov, Emanuel (1999). "38. The Septuagint Additions ('Miscellanies') in 1 Kings 2 (3 Reigns 2)". The Greek and Hebrew Bible: Collected Essays on the Septuagint. Vetus Testamentum Supplements. Vol. 72. Leiden: Brill. doi:10.1163/9789004275973_039. ISBN 9789004275973.
- Trible, Phyllis (1984). Texts of Terror: Literary-feminist Readings of Biblical Narratives. Philadelphia: Fortress Press.
- van de Giessen, J. P. (2003). "Index Bijbelverzen". bijbelaantekeningen.nl (in Dutch).
- Van der Pool, Charles (1996). "Apostolic Bible Polyglot (ABP)". Biblehub.com.
- Wells, Bruce (2020). "On the Beds of a Woman: The Leviticus Texts on Same-Sex Relations Reconsidered". Sexuality and Law in the Torah. Bloomsbury Publishing. pp. 123–158. ISBN 9780567681607.
