= What's the Difference (disambiguation) =

"What's the Difference" is a song by Dr. Dre.

What's the Difference may also refer to:

- What's the Difference?, a book by John Piper, later republished as part of Recovering Biblical Manhood and Womanhood
- What's the Difference, a 1986 TV movie about IVF starring Debra Lawrance
