= Danvers Statement =

Statement of the complementarian Christian view of gender roles

The Danvers Statement is a statement of the complementarian Christian view of gender roles. It is not the product of any particular Christian denomination, but has been cited by the Southwestern Baptist Seminary, the Presbyterian Church in America, and the International Council for Gender Studies. It was first published by the Council on Biblical Manhood and Womanhood (CBMW) in Wheaton, Illinois in November 1988. Work on the statement began with "several evangelical leaders" at a CBMW meeting in Danvers, Massachusetts in December 1987. In 1989, a paid advertisement center-spread appeared in the January 13 issue of Christianity Today accompanied with the Danvers Statement.

In February 1989, R.K. McGregor Wright put out "Response to the Danvers Statement," an unpublished paper delivered to the Christians for Biblical Equality Conference, St. Paul, which was later revised and republished. In 1990 Christians for Biblical Equality published a statement "Men, Women & Biblical Equality," in Christianity Today.

Randall Balmer says that the Statement was an attempt to "staunch the spread of biblical feminism in evangelical circles." Seth Dowland suggests that the authors of the statement "framed their position as a clear and accessible reading of scripture.

The Danvers Statement is included in readers such as Evangelicalism and Fundamentalism: A Documentary Reader (NYU Press, 2008) and Eve and Adam: Jewish, Christian, and Muslim readings on Genesis and gender (Indiana University Press, 2009).

== See also ==
- Colorado Springs Guidelines
- Journal for Biblical Manhood and Womanhood
- Recovering Biblical Manhood and Womanhood
