= Carroll D. Osburn =

American educator and humanitarian

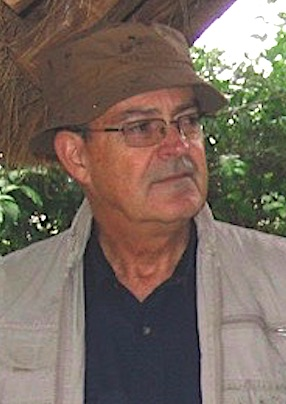
- Education: Harding University; Vanderbilt University; University of St. Andrews, Scotland
- Occupations: Educator; Humanitarian
- Known for: Textual Criticism of the New Testament; Bible Translation Among Pre-literate People; Gender Equality; Humanitarian Work

Carroll D. Osburn, an American scholar recognized as one of North America's leading New Testament textual critics and a prominent Christian egalitarian, is Carmichael-Walling Distinguished Professor Emeritus at Abilene Christian University, and former executive director, Caris Foundation. As an author, he has been collected primarily by libraries.

== Education ==
Osburn graduated from Harding University, where he was president of the senior class and received a BA in 1963, with majors in biology and Greek. He received the MTh in 1968 from Harding School of Theology. After graduating from Vanderbilt University in 1970 with the DDiv [now DMin] degree, he received his PhD in New Testament and early Byzantine Greek from the University of St. Andrews, Scotland, in 1974.

== Academic career ==
From 1973 to 1983, Osburn served as Professor of Greek and New Testament at Harding School of Theology. To students primarily from Churches of Christ for whom the use of scripture was dogmatic proof-texting, Osburn emphasized literary and historical controls to biblical interpretation. Eugene Nida encouraged him to serve as translation consultant for Bible translators among pre-literate people. Utilizing discourse analysis, Osburn conducted numerous short-term, one book workshops for translators in Central and South America in the 1970s and 1980s. He also developed sensitivity to humanitarian needs in the Developing World. Adding discourse analysis to literary and historical method led to Greek classes formerly of five or six numbering fifty or sixty. He became a popular speaker at seminars and retreats in the U.S. and around the world. In 1980, he was visiting professor at the University of St. Andrews, and in 1983, was named “Educator of the Year” by 20th Century Christian.

Osburn became Distinguished Professor of New Testament at Pepperdine University 1983–1987. Urged by Kurt Aland, Matthew Black, and Bruce Metzger, he concentrated attention on ancient manuscripts underlying the Greek New Testament, and chaired the New Testament Textual Criticism Section of the Society of Biblical Literature 1984–90.

In 1987, Osburn was invited to Abilene Christian University, where he was Carmichel-Walling Distinguished Professor of New Testament Language and Literature until 2004. He was named “Honors Professor of the Year” in 1992 and 1996, and was Chair of the Faculty Senate in 1999–2000. He was on the Steering Committee of the International Greek New Testament Project on John (Birmingham, England) and co-editor of Acts of the Apostles in Novum Testamentum Graecum Editio Critica Maior (Institüt für neutestamentliche Textforschung; Münster, Germany) until 2004. He was visiting professor at the American School of Classical Studies in Athens in 1989, at Universität Münster in 2003, and at Claremont School of Theology in 2008. He did archaeological work with Hebrew University of Jerusalem at the Philistine city of Ekron [Tel Miqne] in 1993. In 2004, he published The Text of the Apostolos in Epiphanius of Salamis. Osburn was invited frequently to lecture at universities in Europe, Canada, Africa, and South America. He was a member of Association Internationale d’Études Patristiques and continues membership in Studiorum Novi Testamenti Societas.

In addition to challenging fundamentalists to rethink polemical interpretation of biblical texts, Osburn also worked to expand boundaries of exclusiveness. He was a pioneer within his religious heritage, tackling difficult issues such as dogmatic sectarianism and gender inequality. In 1993, he published The Peaceable Kingdom: Essays Favoring Non-Sectarian Christianity, and in 2001, Women in the Church: Reclaiming the Ideal. He initiated and hosted the annual Carmichael-Walling Lectures at ACU, which brought renowned scholars from around the world to the campus for stimulating lectures and discussion beyond traditional thinking. His challenges to rethink crucial issues met forceful opposition, but with passing of time, were accepted by increasing numbers of moderates. A festschrift presented to him on his sixty-fifth birthday consists of essays by noted scholars from around the world, some his former students.

== Humanitarian career ==
In 2004, Osburn retired early from academia, became non-denominational, and embraced early Christian emphasis on caring for the poor by becoming executive director of Caris Foundation, Irving, TX, charged with providing basic needs for the underserved. Following construction of medical facilities in Guatemala and Haiti, he concentrated on providing water, food, shelter, clothing, medicine, and education in Africa from 2004 to 2008. A member of Corporate Council on Africa, he was well known for rigorous due diligence, collegiality, and forging alliances among agencies.

In addition to arranging care for hundreds of orphans in Addis Ababa, Ethiopia, he enabled the Fistula Hospital to construct a midwife training college at Desta Minder. In Kenya, he worked with agencies to drill several deep wells to provide pure water, provide care for thousands of orphans, enable women with AIDS to learn skills with which to earn a living, distribute thousands of anti-malarial mosquito nets, provide quality-controlled medications, and assist indigenous humanitarian efforts. He arranged construction of a major facility at Kijabe for an accredited residency program in pediatric orthopedic surgery for African doctors, and funding for hundreds of clubfoot treatments in Kenya and Ethiopia. In Uganda, he arranged funding for hundreds of pediatric orthopedic and neurological surgeries, in northern Democratic Republic of Congo rehabilitation of several medical clinics looted and destroyed during the civil war 1997–2002, and in Rwanda assistance for hundreds of child-headed households. In Zambia, he arranged construction of a major AIDS hospital, TB/AIDS clinics, laboratories, funded hundreds of burn surgeries, and provided an x-ray machine for a rural hospital. In 2008, Osburn was visiting professor in the School of Management, University of St. Andrews, writing on humanitarian issues arising from his work.

Osburn served on the National Committee of Boy Scouts of America from 2005 to 2014. From 2008 to 2015, he served as Advisor with Chiapas International, Dallas, Texas, providing micro-finance for the underserved in Mexico and the Dominican Republic. Since 2016, he serves on the advisory board of Miles of Freedom, a Dallas non-profit facilitating integration of formerly incarcerated persons into society.

== Selected works ==
=== Books ===
- Osburn, Carroll D. (1994). Women in the Church: refocusing the discussion (1st ed.). Abilene, TX: Abilene Christian University Press. ISBN 9780963899415. OCLC 31912727.
- ——— (1993). The Peaceable Kingdom: essays favoring non-sectarian Christianity. Abilene, TX: Restoration Perspectives. OCLC 29262592.
- ——— (2001). Women in the Church: Reclaiming the Ideal. Abilene, TX: Abilene Christian University Press. ISBN 9780891120216. OCLC 47127190. - revised edition of 1994's Women in the Church: refocusing the discussion
- ——— (2004). The Text of the Apostolos in Epiphanius of Salamis. New Testament in the Greek fathers. Vol. 6. Leiden, The Netherlands: E. J. Brill, 2004. ISBN 9789004130586. OCLC 56510748.

=== As editor ===
- ———, ed. (1993). Essays on Women in Earliest Christianity. Vol. 1. Joplin, MO: College Press. ISBN 9780899006185. OCLC 60132908.
- ———, ed. (1995). Essays on Women in Earliest Christianity. Vol. 2. Joplin, MO: College Press. ISBN 9780899007342. OCLC 779466678.

=== Articles and chapters ===
- ——— (1972). "The Text of Jude 22, 23". Zeitschrift für die neutestamentliche Textforschung. 63: 139–44.
- ——— (1977). "The Christological Use of 1 Enoch 1.9 in Jude 14,15". New Testament Studies. 23 (3): 334–341. doi:10.1017/S0028688500010560. S2CID 170708749.
- ——— (1981). "The Text of Jude 5". Biblica. 62: 107–115.
- ——— (1981). "The Present Indicative in Matt. 19:9". Restoration Quarterly. 24: 193–203.
- ——— (1981). "The Text of 1 Corinthians 10:9". In Fee, Gordon; Epp, Eldon Jay (eds.). New Testament Textual Criticism: Essays in Honour of Bruce M. Metzger. Oxford: Clarendon Press. pp. 202–212. OCLC 557458636.
- ——— (1982). "Authenteo (1 Timothy 2:12)". Restoration Quarterly. 25: 1–12.
- ——— (1982). "Interpretation of Romans 8:28". Westminster Theological Journal. 44: 99–109.
- ——— (1982). "Alexander Campbell and the Text of Revelation 19:13". Restoration Quarterly. 25: 129–138.
- ——— (1982). "The Text of the Pauline Epistles in Hippolytus of Rome". The Second Century. 2: 97–124.
- ——— (1983). "Historical Present in Mark as a Text-critical Criterion". Biblica. 64: 486–500.
- ——— (1983). "The Third Person Imperative in Acts 2:38". Restoration Quarterly. 26: 81–84.
- ——— (1984). "The Epistle to Titus: A Missiological Perspective". In Brecheen, Carl (ed.). Called to Be Servants. Abilene, TX: ACU Bookstore. pp. 146–177.
- ——— (1985). "1 Enoch 80:2-8 and Jude 12-13". Catholic Biblical Quarterly. 47: 296–303.
- ——— (1990). "Manuscripts". In Ferguson, Everett (ed.). Encyclopedia of Early Christianity. New York: Garland. pp. 563–566. ISBN 9780815333197. OCLC 614117141.
- ——— (1991). "The Search for the Original Text of Acts". Journal for the Study of the New Testament. 44: 39–55.
- ——— (1992). "The Johannine Comma (1 John 5:7)". In Freedman, David Noel (ed.). Anchor Bible Dictionary. Vol. 3. New York: Doubleday. pp. 882–883. ISBN 9780385193610. OCLC 311564797.
- ——— (1992). "Discourse Analysis and Jewish Apocalyptic in the Epistle of Jude". In Black, David Alan (ed.). Linguistics and New Testament Interpretation: Essays on Discourse Analysis. Nashville, TN: Broadman Press. pp. 287–319.
- ——— (1995). "The Greek Lectionaries of the New Testament". In Ehrman, Bart; Holmes, Michael W. (eds.). The Text of the New Testament in Contemporary Research: Essays on the Status Quaestionis. Grand Rapids, MI: Eerdmans. pp. 61–74.
- ——— (1998). "Letter of Jude". In Freedman, David Noel (ed.). Eerdman's Dictionary of the Bible. Grand Rapids, MI: Eerdmans. pp. 225–256.
- ——— (2005). "Methodology in Identifying Patristic Citations in NT Textual Criticism". Novum Testamentum. 47 (4): 313–343. doi:10.1163/156853605774482135.
- ——— (2006). "James, Sirach, and the Poor". Ex Auditu. 22: 113–132.
- ——— (2013). "The Greek Lectionaries of the New Testament". In Ehrman, Bart; Holmes, Michael W. (eds.). The Text of the New Testament in Contemporary Research: Essays on the Status Quaestionis. Leiden: Brill. pp. 93–113. - represents a significant revision of the original chapter in the first edition of Ehrman, Bart; Holmes, Michael W. 1995
