= New International Version Inclusive Language Edition =

Edition of the bible, published 1995–1996

The New International Version Inclusive Language Edition (NIVi) of the Christian Bible is an inclusive language version of the New International Version (NIV). It was published by Hodder and Stoughton (a subsidiary of Lagardere Publishing) in London in 1995; New Testament and Psalms, with the full Bible following in 1996. It was only released in the United Kingdom and British Commonwealth Countries.

In 1997, an article by World Magazine accused the NIVi of being "a feminist seduction of the evangelical church". This led to a protest in evangelical circles, led by James Dobson. A meeting led by Dobson released the Colorado Springs Guidelines, a set of guidelines on gender in Bible translation. One of the criticisms was that the word man was replaced by a variety of words in a very mechanical way ("anyone", "person" etc.) even in passages where clearly a man was indicated. Despite some evangelicals coming to the defense of the NIVi, Zondervan responded by not releasing the NIVi in the United States.

A modified edition was published in 1999. Typical of the changes was Leviticus 15:2-15, where "man" was restored in the 1999 edition, as the passage clearly concerned males. Also a John 17:6-26 speech of Jesus was indented in the 1999 edition, following the indentation of similar passages in the gospel.

In 2002, the Today's New International Version (TNIV) was published as a successor, and made available worldwide. In 2011, all previous editions of the NIV, including the TNIV, were withdrawn from publication in favor of a new edition which moderates some of the inclusive language.
