= Alvera Mickelsen =

American journalist

- Born: 1919
- Died: July 12, 2016 (aged 96–97)
- Education: Wheaton College, Medill School of Journalism at Northwestern University
- Spouse: A. Berkeley Mickelsen

Alvera Mickelsen (1919 – July 12, 2016) was an American academic, author, and women's equality activist.

== History ==
Mickelsen was an evangelical Christian. She spent her professional life advocating "that being a feminist is a Christian responsibility," despite resistance from some sectors. She published numerous books and scholarly articles on the topic of women's equality within Christianity. Alvera Mickelsen joined her colleagues to co-found Christians for Biblical Equality (CBE) in the late 1980s, a non-profit organization of churches and individuals which advocates for the equality of women within the church, as well as in their homes and society. Additionally, Mickelsen was a longtime professor of journalism at Bethel University in Minnesota from 1968 to 1986.

Mickelsen was born in 1919 as one of five children of Swedish immigrant parents and raised in a small farmhouse just outside La Porte, Indiana. The family moved to Michigan City, Indiana, when she was nine years old. However, the Great Depression soon left her parents destitute just one year after they relocated to Michigan City. Mickelsen still graduated from high school in 1936 and became the first member of her family to enroll in college. She transferred between several colleges and universities due to scholarships, before graduating from Wheaton College in Illinois in 1942.

Following her graduation from Wheaton College, she received her master's degree in journalism from Medill School of Journalism at Northwestern University. She then became an editor for several Christian magazines and publications based in Chicago, before returning to Wheaton College as a professor. She met her husband, A. Berkeley Mickelsen, while teaching at Wheaton. The couple married in 1952 and had two daughters. Alvera Mickelsen continued to teach at Wheaton while simultaneously completing her second master's degree, this time in education, also from Wheaton.

In 1965, the family moved to Arden Hills, Minnesota, where Berkeley Mickelsen had been hired as a professor of Greek, Hebrew and theology at Bethel Seminary. Alvera Mickelsen also became a professor of journalism at Bethel College (now called Bethel University) in 1968, where she taught until 1986.

During the 1970s, Mickelsen and her husband, who were progressive evangelicals, became concerned by the perception of a backlash against women's rights and equality within the evangelical community. Together, Alvera and A. Berkeley Mickelsen published two books which cited Biblical passages that supported the equality of the sexes. They began touring Minnesota to debate leading pastors and theologians on the topic of gender equality within Christianity. The Mickelsens later helped to establish the non-profit group, Christians for Biblical Equality (CBE), during the 1980s. Alvera Mickelsen also served as the first chair of CBE's board of directors.

After the unexpected death of A. Berkeley Mickelsen, aged 69, in 1990, Alvera Mickelsen continued to tour worldwide to promote gender equality and feminism within evangelicalism. According to Mimi Haddad, the current President of Christians for Biblical Equality, Mickelsen was once asked by a Christian radio show host how she could be both a traditional evangelical Christian and a feminist simultaneously. Mickelsen replied that the host should look up feminism in a dictionary, where the word was defined as "a belief that women should have social, political, and economic equality with men." The host replied that " 'Well, I believe in all those things', to which Mickelsen responded, 'Well, then, you are a feminist!' "

Alvera Mickelsen died from natural causes on July 12, 2016, at age 97.

== Selected works authored ==
- The Family Bible Encyclopedia: A-J (Vol. 1), co-authored with Berkeley Mickelsen (1978)
- Family Bible Encyclopedia: K-Z (Vol. 2), co-authored with Berkeley Mickelsen (1978)
- Bible Encyclopedia, Volumes 1-2, co-authored with Berkeley Mickelsen (1978)
- Women, Authority & the Bible (1986)
- How To Write Missionary Letters (1988)
- Women in Ministry: Four Views, edited by Bonnidell Clouse and Robert G. Clouse (1989)
- Understanding Scripture: How to Read and Study the Bible (1992)
