= Council on Biblical Manhood and Womanhood =

Evangelical Christian organization

- Abbreviation: CBMW
- Formation: 1987
- Location: United States
- President: Denny Burk
- Website: cbmw.org

The Council on Biblical Manhood and Womanhood (CBMW) is an evangelical Christian organization promoting a complementarian view of gender issues. According to its website, the "mission of The Council on Biblical Manhood and Womanhood is to set forth the teachings of the Bible about the complementary differences between men and women, created equally in the image of God, because these teachings are essential for obedience to Scripture and for the health of the family and the church." CBMW's current president is Dr. Denny Burk, a professor of biblical studies at Boyce College and director for The Center for Gospel and Culture at The Southern Baptist Theological Seminary. Its 2017 "Nashville Statement" was criticized by egalitarian Christians and LGBT campaigners, as well as by several conservative religious figures.

== History ==
The Council on Biblical Manhood and Womanhood was organized in 1987. At a 1986 meeting of the Evangelical Theological Society (ETS), Wayne Grudem gave a speech on "Manhood and Womanhood in Biblical and Theological Perspectives" in which he invited delegates to join "a new organization dedicated to upholding both equality and differences between men and women in marriage and the church." This was followed by a meeting in Dallas with Grudem, John Piper, Wayne House, and others. A subsequent meeting was held in Danvers, Massachusetts; at this meeting, the Danvers Statement on Biblical Manhood and Womanhood was finalized. A full-page advertisement containing the full Danvers Statement was published in Christianity Today in January 1989.

Founders of the CBMW coined the term "complementarianism" in 1988.

In 1991, Crossway Books published the organization's lengthy book, Recovering Biblical Manhood and Womanhood: A Response to Evangelical Feminism. Edited by Piper and Grudem, this book included contributions by D. A. Carson, John Frame, Vern Poythress, Douglas J. Moo, Paige Patterson, Elisabeth Elliot, and several other writers. Bill Bright of Campus Crusade for Christ also supported the organization.

In the late 1990s, CBMW published articles and papers critical of Gender-Neutral Bible translations. CBMW has drawn Christian media attention by expressing concerns about such translations. The organization's thoughts on Bible translations have had influence upon Southern Baptists. The CBMW opposes same-sex marriage.

=== The Danvers Statement ===
The CBMW adopted the Danvers Statement in 1988. It summarizes the CBMW's views on sex and gender roles.

The Danvers Statement has been endorsed or adopted by the Southern Baptist Theological Seminary, Southwestern Baptist Seminary, Midwestern Baptist Theological Seminary, Cedarville University, and several independent churches. Randall Balmer says that the Statement was an attempt to "staunch the spread of biblical feminism in evangelical circles." Seth Dowland suggests that the authors of the statement "framed their position as a clear and accessible reading of Scripture. The Danvers Statement is included in readers such as Evangelicalism and Fundamentalism: A Documentary Reader (NYU Press, 2008). The Danvers Statement recognized the "genuine evangelical standing of many who do not agree with all of our convictions."

=== 1994 statement on abuse ===
In 1994, at the request of Christians for Biblical Equality (a leading Christian egalitarian organization), three leaders of CBMW met with three of the CBE's leaders in Chicago to discuss potential points of agreement. According to Grudem, both sides overcame some misunderstandings about each other. One result of the meeting was an agreement to work on a joint statement on abuse in marriage, which was drafted by the CBMW with feedback from the CBE. However, before it was to be issued, the CBE's board declined to join the statement. The statement was later published in the CBMW's own newsletter (later renamed the Journal for Biblical Manhood and Womanhood). It has subsequently been published on their website and in many of their publications.

James Beck, declining the joint statement on behalf of the CBE Board of Directors, stated: "We do not feel it would be helpful to convene a joint press conference at ETS to issue a joint statement on abuse. CBE’s position on abuse flows directly out of our theological understanding of Scripture and what it teaches about gender and roles. If we attempt to issue a joint statement with an organization that differs fundamentally from us on this issue, we feel both organizations would be giving very mixed signals to their respective constituencies." Wayne Grudem commented: “We regret that CBE declined to join us in this statement. If CBE will not join us in something on which we agree (condemning abuse), then I see little hope that they will be willing to join us in constructive dialogue on issues where we disagree. This is unfortunate for the evangelical world.”

=== Nashville Statement ===
On 29 August 2017, CBMW released a manifesto on human sexuality known as the "Nashville Statement". The Statement expresses support for an opposite-sex definition of marriage, for faithfulness within marriage, for chastity outside marriage, and for a link between biological sex and "self-conception as male and female." The Statement sets forth the signatories' opposition to LGBT sexuality, same-sex marriage, polygamy, polyamory, adultery, and fornication. The statement was signed by 150 evangelical leaders, and includes 14 points of belief. The Statement:

- Affirms that God designed marriage as a lifelong union between male and female, and that marriage “is meant to signify the covenant love between Christ and his bride the church.”
- Denies that differences between men and women render the sexes “unequal in dignity or worth.”
- Denies that LGBT identities are consistent with God’s purposes;
- Affirms that “Christ Jesus has come into the world to save sinners and that through Christ’s death and resurrection forgiveness of sins and eternal life are available to every person who repents of sin and trusts in Christ alone as Savior, Lord, and supreme treasure.”

Since its release, the Nashville Statement has been endorsed or adopted by the Presbyterian Church in America (PCA), The Southern Baptist Theological Seminary, Midwestern Baptist Theological Seminary, Union University, and Cedarville University.

Due to perceived homophobia, transphobia, and misogyny, the Nashville Statement has attracted controversy.

- The statement was opposed not only by LGBT advocates, but also other conservative Christians, including Evangelicals and Catholics.
- An opposing statement was published on 30 August 2017 by Christians United, a group of signatories. Brandan Robertson drafted the Christians United statement, and the Rev. Steve Chalke and other edited it. Signatories included John C. Dorhauer, the General Minister and President of the United Church of Christ; Yvette Flunder; and Jayne Ozanne.
- Nashville mayor Megan Barry stated "[the] so-called 'Nashville statement' is poorly named and does not represent the inclusive values of the city & people of Nashville".
- The Episcopal Bishop of Central Florida, Gregory Brewer, described the statement as "tone deaf to the nuances of Jesus".
- Jesuit priest James Martin, replied to the Nashville Statement with his own set of affirmations and denials, beginning with "I affirm: That God loves all LGBT people".

== Journal ==
Wayne Grudem co-founded a CBMW newsletter, which became the Journal for Biblical Manhood & Womanhood, published biannually. In the Spring of 2019, CBMW renamed its biannual journal Eikon: A Journal for Biblical Anthropology. The journal usually consists of around fifteen articles composed by various evangelical scholars who hold to complementarian views.

== Publications ==
- Piper, John; Grudem, Wayne A. Recovering Biblical Manhood and Womanhood: A Response to Evangelical Feminism (PDF). Crossway Books. ISBN 978-1-58134-806-4 – via Desiring God. (Book of the Year for Christianity Today, 1992).

== See also ==
- Women in Christianity
- Women in the Bible
