= Christians for Biblical Equality =

Christian egalitarian organization

Christians for Biblical Equality (CBE) is an organization that promotes Christian egalitarianism and is headquartered in Minneapolis, Minnesota. CBE believes in equal ordination of women. CBE has grown to include members from over 100 denominations and 65 countries.

== Services ==
The organization is an educational ministry that publishes three award-winning journals, hosts a Web site and a blog, and a weekly e-newsletter. It provides an online bookstore devoted to reviewing and promoting resources on gender and the Bible from an egalitarian (as opposed to complementarian) perspective. It supports grassroots chapters around the world. CBE's scholarly journal, Priscilla Papers, and ministry magazine, Mutuality, have received various publishing awards.

== Beliefs ==
CBE holds that any interpretation of Scripture that prohibits women from using their spiritual gifts and abilities in ministry constitutes injustice. CBE defines injustice as an abuse of power, taking from others freedom, dignity, resources, and even life itself. CBE considers gender discrimination within the church to be an injustice that harms the Christian church at large and Christian ministry in the world.

CBE holds the following core values:

1. Scripture is our authoritative guide for faith, life, and practice.

2. Patriarchy (male dominance) is not a biblical ideal but a result of sin.

3. Patriarchy is an abuse of power, taking from females what God has given them: their dignity, and freedom, their leadership, and often their very lives.

4. While the Bible reflects patriarchal culture, the Bible does not teach patriarchy in human relationships.

5. Christ's redemptive work frees all people from patriarchy, calling women and men to share authority equally in service and leadership.

6. God's design for relationships includes faithful marriage between a man and a woman, celibate singleness and mutual submission in Christian community.

7. The unrestricted use of women's gifts is integral to the work of the Holy Spirit and essential for the advancement of the gospel in the world.

8. Followers of Christ are to oppose injustice and patriarchal teachings and practices that marginalize and abuse females and males.

== History ==
CBE was founded out of concerns over the inability of many women to use their gifts in ministry, and many evangelical egalitarians objecting to the earlier evangelical feminist organisation the Evangelical Women's Caucus (EWC) supporting gay rights. In 1986, the EWC voted on a resolution recognising its "lesbian minority" and supporting civil rights for homosexual people, which led to many members resigning, including Catherine Clark Kroeger who was encouraged by others to form an alternate organization.

Several evangelical leaders, including Kroeger, Gilbert Bilezikian, W. Ward Gasque, Stanley Gundry, Gretchen Gaebelein Hull, Jo Anne Lyon, Alvera Mickelsen and Roger Nicole assembled in 1987 to publish their perspective in a new scholarly journal, Priscilla Papers. The group determined that a national organization was needed to provide education, support, and leadership about Biblical equality. They constructed a statement entitled "Men, Women, and Biblical Equality" that provides an overview of the Biblical teachings that support women's full participation in all levels of ministry, as well as mutuality in marriage. The statement was widely published in 1990 in such national forums as Christianity Today and Leadership. The Statement has been translated and disseminated into 15 languages.

Christians for Biblical Equality was established on January 2, 1988. Catherine Clark Kroeger served as the first president of the organization. Since 2001, Mimi Haddad has served as CBE's second president. CBE's papers are held at Catherine Clark Kroeger's family home.

An Australian Chapter of CBE was established in Melbourne in October 2005. This has now expanded to three Australian Chapters, in Melbourne, Sydney and Perth.

The Council on Biblical Manhood and Womanhood (CBMW) was formed in 1987 to defend a complementarian perspective.

=== 1994 proposed statement on abuse ===
In 1994, at the CBE's request, Ray Ortlund, Mary Kassian, and Wayne Grudem of the Council on Biblical Manhood and Womanhood, met with three of the CBE's leaders in Chicago to discuss potential points of agreement. According to Grudem, both sides overcame some misunderstandings about each other. One result of the meeting was an agreement to work on a joint statement on abuse in marriage, which was drafted by the CBMW with feedback from the CBE. However, before it was to be issued, the CBE's board declined to join the statement. The statement was later published in the CBMW's own newsletter (later renamed the Journal for Biblical Manhood and Womanhood). It has subsequently been published on their website and in many of their publications.

James Beck, declining the joint statement on behalf of the CBE Board of Directors, stated: "We do not feel it would be helpful to convene a joint press conference at ETS to issue a joint statement on abuse. CBE's position on abuse flows directly out of our theological understanding of Scripture and what it teaches about gender and roles. If we attempt to issue a joint statement with an organization that differs fundamentally from us on this issue, we feel both organizations would be giving very mixed signals to their respective constituencies." Wayne Grudem commented: "We regret that CBE declined to join us in this statement. If CBE will not join us in something on which we agree (condemning abuse), then I see little hope that they will be willing to join us in constructive dialogue on issues where we disagree. This is unfortunate for the evangelical world."

== Conferences ==
Beginning in 1989, CBE has presented international conferences—three-day events consisting of plenary sessions and workshops in such U.S. cities such as Cape Cod, Massachusetts; Saint Paul, Minnesota; Winter Park, Colorado; Wheaton, Illinois; San Diego, California; Orlando, Florida; Dallas, Texas; Portland, Oregon; Denver, Colorado; Toronto, Canada; St. Louis, Missouri; Houston, Texas; Seattle, Washington; Chicago, Illinois; and Pittsburgh, Pennsylvania. The 2019 International Conference will be conducted in Houston, Texas.

International off-shore conferences have been held in Durham, England; Bangalore, India; Limuru, Kenya; Medellín, Colombia; and in Australia.

== See also ==
- Christian egalitarianism: An article that distinguishes between philosophical egalitarianism and uniquely Christian Egalitarianism.
- Complementarianism: An alternative to Christian egalitarianism. Complementarians interpret Scripture to teach that women and men are created equal, though men are to hold authority over women in the home and/or the church. This authority is not 'ultimate', but derived from God's ultimate authority over the church and home. The use of the term "complementarian" is disputed, as many members of CBE consider themselves to be complementarians, but without hierarchy; that is, they believe that the sexes complement each other, but they do not believe in the necessity of male spiritual authority.
- Christian views of women: A developing article that includes a section on "Jesus and woman".
- Evangelical and Ecumenical Women's Caucus.
- Council on Biblical Manhood and Womanhood: A leading complementarian organization.
