= Priscilla Papers =

- Language: English
- Edited by: Jeffrey D. Miller

Publication details
- History: 1987–present
- Publisher: Christians for Biblical Equality (United States)
- Frequency: Quarterly

Standard abbreviations
- ISO 4: Priscilla Pap.

Indexing
- ISSN: 0898-753X
- OCLC no.: 262616030

Links
- Journal homepage; Online archive

Priscilla Papers is an academic journal published by the Christians for Biblical Equality, covering "evangelical scholarship on issues of equality." The editor-in-chief is Jeffrey D. Miller.

It was established in 1987, shortly before CBE was formed.
