= Gender in Bible translation =

Gender in Bible translation concerns issues such as how to represent the gender of God and how to handle generic antecedents in reference to people when translating the Bible into a language like English that does not have third-person generic pronouns for people. Traditionally English uses male pronouns by default when gender is unknown, and male pronouns have traditionally been used for God as well. Modern translations sometimes choose other ways to handle the gender of God and of generic references to people.

The King James Version translated at least one passage using a technique that many now reject in other translations: Matt. 5:9 is translated as "Blessed are the peacemakers, for they shall be called the children of God". The Greek word υἱοὶ (huioí) that appears in the original is usually translated as "sons", but in this passage the translators chose to use the term "children" to include both genders. The New Revised Standard Version (NRSV) was one of the first major translations to adopt gender-neutral language on a broader scale. Opponents of gender-neutral language believe that readers who are not familiar with the original languages can be influenced by a compromised meaning they believe is feminist.

Bruce Metzger states that the English language is so biased towards the male gender that it restricts and obscures the meaning of the original language, which was more gender-inclusive than a literal translation would convey. Wayne Grudem disagrees, believing that a translation should try to match the words of the original language rather than introduce the translator's opinion as to whether the original words meant to include both sexes or not, and that trying to be gender-neutral results in a vague and contorted writing style. Michael Marlowe argues from a third standpoint, that the cultures in the Bible were patriarchal. The topic has theological and political undercurrents. Jesuit scholar Paul Mankowski says that inclusive-language translators are bowing to feminist political taboos rather than trying to translate accurately, while Marmy Clason says that their opponents are motivated by hostility to feminism rather than fidelity to the original meaning.

== Translation of the names of God ==
There are a number of ways to translate the names of God into English from Hebrew. Hebrew uses only four consonants for the name—Yod-Heh-Waw-Heh (יהוה, YHWH)—hence it is called the Tetragrammaton. Some modern English bibles render this as LORD—L capital, and ord in small capital case. Others use Yahweh, and the old King James Version used Jehovah. In English, outside Bible translations, the tetragrammaton is often written as YHWH or YHVH.

The original meaning of this form is connected with the "I AM" of Exodus 3:14 (and it probably contains a Hebrew masculine verb prefix—the Y or yod). Sometimes this word is rendered into English by using Hebrew Adonai, instead of attempting to directly translate YHWH, following an ancient Jewish custom of respect.

The Hebrew word Adonai literally means my lord (with pseudo-plural), and is usually translated as Lord.

=== Third person pronouns for God ===
Many prayers use one or more of the names for God many times within the same paragraph. The first time it appears a proper name is used, while further instances use a third person pronoun (he, she or it). English speakers usually use masculine or feminine third person pronouns to refer to people and animals, and the third person pronoun—"it"—to refer to (inanimate) objects. Traditionally, in Jewish, Christian, and Muslim writing, the third-person pronoun "He" has been used to refer to God in English translations.

The idea of God being an "It" rather than a "he" or "she" does have some support in Jewish, Christian and Islamic rationalist medieval thought, much of which was based on Neo-Aristotelian philosophy. Some medieval philosophers of all three of these religions took great pains to make clear that God was in no way like a person, and that all apparently physical descriptions of God were only poetic metaphors.

In the Chinese language, translators of the Christian Bible used a special Chinese character to act as a divine pronoun, 祂 (Pinyin: tā), which is, in essence, the universal third person pronoun for all objects and persons; however, personhood (as well as gender) can be distinguished in writing. The normal pronoun for he, 他 (also read tā), is also used in generic cases. The radical 亻 (rén) therein marks personhood (distinct from non-human referents), not simply gender alone. 礻 (shì), the radical in the divine pronoun 祂, marks the "elevated personhood" of divinity, without implying anything about the gender of the divinity referred to.

== See also ==
- Bible version debate

== Bibliography ==
- Kimbrough, ST Jr.. 'Bible Translation and the Gender of God'. Theology Today (1989): 195–202.
- Piper, John and Wayne A Grudem (eds). Recovering Biblical Manhood and Womanhood: A Response to Evangelical Feminism. Wheaton, Illinois: Crossway Books, 1991.
- Poythress, Vern Sheriden and Wayne A Grudem. The Gender-Neutral Bible Controversy: Muting the Masculinity of God's Words. Nashville, Tennessee: Broadman & Holman Publishers, 2000.
- Poythress, Vern Sheriden. 'Gender in Bible Translation: Exploring a Connection with Male Representatives'. Westminster Theological Journal (1998): 225–53.
- Reimers, Paula. 'Feminism, Judaism, and God the Mother'. Conservative Judaism (1993).
