= Catherine Clark Kroeger =

American writer (1925–2011)

Catherine Clark Kroeger (December 12, 1925 – February 14, 2011) was an American writer, professor, New Testament scholar, and a figure within the biblical egalitarian movement. She founded the worldwide organization Christians for Biblical Equality (CBE), and its papers are housed at her family home. As a speaker, Kroeger traveled the globe opposing violence and the abuse of women, while also advancing the biblical basis for the shared leadership and authority of males and females.

== Personal life ==
Born Catherine Clark, daughter of Homer and Elizabeth Clark, in St. Paul, Minnesota, she graduated from Bryn Mawr College in 1947. Then she earned an MA and a PhD in Classical Studies from the University of Minnesota. She was married to her husband of 60 years, Richard Clark Kroeger Jr., a Presbyterian pastor. They served together in ten pastorates in five states. In their latter years they resided on Cape Cod in Brewster, Massachusetts. Richard Clark Kroeger Jr. died 9 November 2010, Catherine Clark Kroeger on 14 February 2011.

== Leadership ==
Besides having founded Christians for Biblical Equality, she established Peace and Safety in the Christian Home (PASCH) and served as its founding president. After rearing five children, she served in leadership roles in other organizations, serving on the board of trustees at Trinity Christian Academy and the Latham Center on Cape Cod, Massachusetts, and at Whitworth College in Spokane, Washington. She held membership in the American Academy of Religion, The Society of Biblical Literature, and the Evangelical Theological Society. She was an active layperson in the Presbyterian Church USA. She was cited in Helen Kooiman Hosier's 100 Christian Women Who Changed the 20th Century, and received an honorary Doctorate in Humane Letters from Houghton College in 2004. She held memberships in the American Academy of Religion, the Society of Biblical Literature and the Evangelical Theological Society. For a quarter of a century she maintained links with scholars in the UK, collaborating with Elaine Storkey and Mary Evans.

== Teaching ==
Kroeger's scholarly interests included women in ancient religion, human sexuality and biblical mandate, women of the Bible, women in the early church, Africans in the Bible and early church, Christian response to domestic abuse and the social world of the early church. She led study tours into ancient world locations that still contain evidence of the active role of women in the early church. These included explorations of the catacombs, edifices, stone inscriptions, and other relics which she saw as evidence that in the early post-Resurrection era, the Christian church's respect and trust for women far exceeded their ecclesiastical status in later centuries, including the present.

Beginning in 1990, Kroeger became a ranked adjunct professor of classical and ministry studies at Gordon Conwell Theological Seminary where she taught courses and mentored students and candidates for graduate degrees. She also served as Protestant chaplain and lecturer in the Department of Religion at Hamilton College.

== Theological view on gender equality ==
Kroeger was a conservative Christian who held a view of the Bible as being divinely-inspired. Unlike others who ignored or wrote off difficult passages of the Bible as being translation errors, scribal glosses, or other textual changes to the original, Kroeger made efforts to discern the original intent of the passage's author. This commitment, combined with her classical studies research, led her to a cultural and historical analysis to propose what was the intent of the author of such passages.

As I tottered out of my dishpan and back to graduate school, one verse above all others impelled me—1 Tim 2:12. In the King James Version, it reads, "I suffer not a woman to teach or usurp authority over a man."

From the writings of Katherine Bushnell[sic], I knew that there might be other ways to translate and to interpret this Bible verse that had obstructed so many women from a full-orbed ministry. In particular, Bushnell had targeted the Greek infinitive authentein, traditionally translated "to have power or authority over." She observed that it was a rare word, used only here in the entire New Testament; but that in other types of Greek literature, it had other meanings that could lead to quite different understandings.

Bushnell had called for women translators and interpreters who would give themselves to the task of conscientiously and faithfully examining the difficult texts that were often used to disbar women from certain types of Christian service. I determined, as God led, to enter the department of classical studies at the University of Minnesota in order to deal with many different Greek materials to examine usages of authentein in other occurrences and to understand all I could have the lives and religious practices of the women addressed by the Apostle Paul. I sought a reconciliation of the difficult Pauline passages with the clear directives empowering women to proclaim Christ.

I progressed in the confidence that the Bible is the Word of God presenting different aspects of a coherent and integrated message. I Suffer Not a Woman, the book which I produced in collaboration with my husband, seeks to set forth a new understanding of 1 Tim 2:11–15 in the light of linguistic, historical and archeological evidence. It was written with the prayer that God might use it to open new doors of gospel opportunity for women and men alike.

— Catherine Clark Kroeger's Testimony http://godswordtowomen.org/kroeger_testimony.htm, Catherine Clark Kroeger's Testimony

== Scholarship Challenged ==
Kroeger was found by other scholars as providing untrustworthy academic material, including falsified quotations of John Chrysostom to bolster her claims about the Greek word kephele. Wayne Grudem wrote an entire section of an article about Kroeger's fraudulent and obfuscating citations, concluding that her scholarship "should be troubling to those who care about accuracy in scholarly work." Grudem claims "in several sections [of Kroeger's work] its disregard of facts is so egregious that it fails even to meet fundamental requirements of truthfulness." Citing Grudem, Marvin Hunn of Dallas Theological Seminary uses Kroeger as an example of "Bad Research Method," specifically of "extensive inaccuracy, perhaps dishonesty." Albert Wolters, in a review of the Kroeger's book I Suffer Not A Woman notes that the "book is precisely the sort of thing that has too often given evangelical scholarship a bad name." He claims that the Kroeger's put their claims in a popular-level book in order to avoid the scrutiny of scholars and concludes that "its argumentation is a travesty of sound scholarship."

== Publications ==
She authored, co-authored or edited thirteen books, including The IVP Women's Bible Commentary.

- Study Bible for Women, (Oxford University Press, Refugio del Abuso: Sandidad y Esperanza Para Mujeres Abusadas (with Nancy Nason-Clark; Grace Nelson, 2005)
- Refuge From Abuse: Hope and Healing for the Abused Christian Woman (with Nancy Nason-Clark; InterVarsity Press, 2004); Also available in Portuguese
- IVPress Women's Bible Commentary, (Downers Grove, 2002)
- No Place for Abuse: Biblical and Practical Resources to Counteract Domestic Violence (with Nancy Nason-Clark; InterVarsity Press, 2001, 2010)
- Healing the Hurting: Giving Hope and Help to Abused Women (with James R. Beck; Baker Books, 1998)
- Women, Abuse, and the Bible: How Scripture Can Be Used to Hurt or to Heal (with James R. Beck; Baker Books, 1996)
- The Goddess Revival, cowritten with Aida Besançon Spencer, Donna F. G. Hailson and William David Spencer (Baker, 1995) The Goddess Revival was a 1996 Christianity Today Book Award winner
- I Suffer Not a Woman: Rethinking 1 Timothy 2:11-15 in Light of Ancient Evidence (with Richard Clark Kroeger; Baker Book House, 1992)
- NRSV Study Bible for Women New Testament, co-authored with Elaine Storkey and Mary Evans (Baker Books, 1985)
- "Does Belief in Women's Equality Lead to an Acceptance of Homosexual Practice?" Priscilla Papers, Spring 2004
- "Pandemonium and Silence at Corinth" (with Richard Kroeger),The Reformed Journal, June 1978
- The Women's Study Bible (ed.) Oxford University Press, USA (September 15, 2009) 0195291255
- Beyond Abuse in the Christian Home: Raising Voices for Change (ed.), Nancy Nason-Clark & Barbara Fisher-Townsend. Wipf & Stock, 2008. 978-1556350863
