= Complementarianism =

Theological view on gender roles

Complementarianism is a theological view in some denominations of Christianity, Rabbinic Judaism, and Islam, that men and women have different but complementary roles and responsibilities in marriage, family, and religious life. Some Christians interpret the Bible as prescribing a complementary view of gender, and therefore adhere to gender-specific roles that preclude women from specific functions of ministry within the community. (Note: According to a complementarian perspective, unqualified men are also to be precluded from these ministries.) Though women may be precluded from certain roles and ministries, they still hold foundational equality in value and dignity. The phrase used to describe this is "ontologically equal, functionally different."

Within a Christian marital relationship, complementarianism prescribes headship and servant leading roles to men, and support roles to women, being based upon the interpretation of certain biblical passages. One precept of complementarianism is that while women may assist in decision-making processes, the ultimate authority for the decision lies in the headship responsibility of the male. Its contrasting perspective is Christian egalitarianism, which holds that positions of authority and responsibility in marriage and religion should be equally available to both females and males.

The Foundation Documents of The Gospel Coalition describes complementarianism as follows:

In God’s wise purposes, men and women are not simply interchangeable, but rather they complement each other in mutually enriching ways. God ordains that they assume distinctive roles which reflect the loving relationship between Christ and the church, (Note: See Ephesians 5:25–33 ESV.) the husband exercising headship in a way that displays the caring, sacrificial love of Christ, and the wife submitting to her husband in a way that models the love of the church for her Lord.

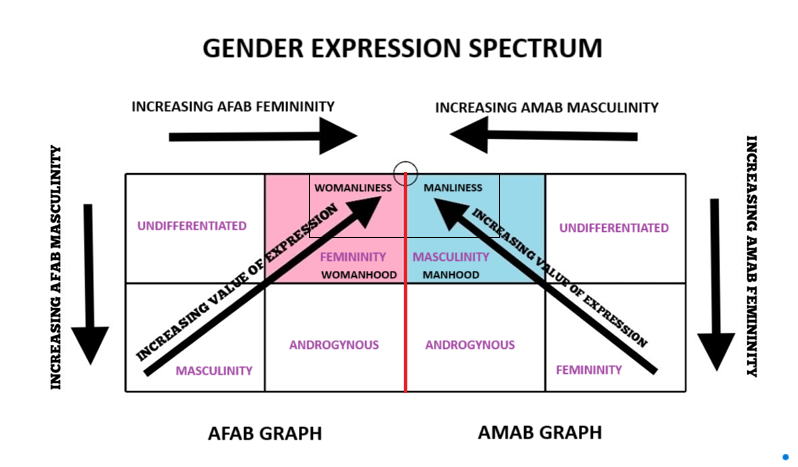
Gender expression spectrum from a complementarian perspective

== Christianity ==
Complementarianism holds that "God has created men and women equal in their essential dignity and human personhood, but different and complementary in function with male headship in the home and in the Church." Many proponents and also opponents of complementarianism see the Bible as the infallible word of God.

The complementarian position claims to uphold what has been the most traditional teaching on gender roles in the church. However, the terms traditionalist or hierarchicalist are usually avoided by complementarians, as the former "implies an unwillingness to let Scripture challenge traditional patterns of behavior", while the latter "overemphasizes structured authority while giving no suggestion of equality or the beauty of mutual interdependence". Therefore, they prefer the term complementarian, "since it suggests both equality and beneficial differences".

While they do not necessarily use the term "complementarianism", many Catholics are advocates of complementarianism with regard to the social doctrine of the Church. The Catechism of the Catholic Church asserts that "God gives man and woman an equal personal dignity" but also that the harmony of society "depends in part on the way in which the complementarity, needs, and mutual support between the sexes are lived out."

=== History ===
The term "complementarianism" was first used by the founders of the Council on Biblical Manhood and Womanhood in 1988.

=== Roles in marriage ===
The complementarian view of marriage asserts gender-based roles in marriage. A husband is considered to have the God-given responsibility to provide for, protect, and lead his family. A wife is to collaborate with her husband, respect him, and serve as his helper in managing the household and nurturing the next generation. Complementarians assert that the Bible instructs husbands to lead their families as Head of Household, and to love their wives as Christ loves the Church. They cite the Bible as instructing wives to respect their husbands' leadership out of reverence for Christ. The husband is also meant to hold moral accountability for his wife and to exhibit a sacrificial love for her. The wife is meant to respond to her husband's love for her with love in-kind and by receiving his service and leadership willingly.

An example of the complementarian view of marriage can be found in the Southern Baptist Convention's Baptist Faith and Message (2000), an excerpt from which is quoted here:

The husband and wife are of equal worth before God, since both are created in God's image. The marriage relationship models the way God relates to his people. A husband is to love his wife as Christ loved the church. He has the God-given responsibility to provide for, to protect, and to lead his family. A wife is to submit herself graciously to the servant leadership of her husband even as the church willingly submits to the headship of Christ. She, being in the image of God as is her husband and thus equal to him, has the God-given responsibility to respect her husband and to serve as his helper in managing the household and nurturing the next generation.

— Article XVIII. The Family. Baptist Faith and Message 2000

The Council on Biblical Manhood and Womanhood teaches that "Christ is the supreme authority and guide for men and women, so that no earthly submission—domestic, religious, or civil—ever implies a mandate to follow a human authority into sin."

The expression Sponsa Christi is sometimes used by complementarian denominations such as the Roman Catholic Church . They claim that the apostle Paul advocated such views in the New Testament.

According to the Lutheran Church – Missouri Synod, the bridegroom symbolizes Christ, while the bride represents the Church (Ecclesia).

=== Roles in the Church ===
Based on their interpretation of certain scriptures complementarians view women's roles in ministry, particularly in church settings, as limited. The complementarian view holds that women should not hold church leadership roles that involve teaching or authority over men. For instance, Frank Page, a former president of the Southern Baptist Convention, has written that "...while both men and women are gifted for service in the church, the office of Pastor is limited to men as qualified by Scripture" while the office of deacon are open to both men and women (excluding Catholicism) According to complementarianism, women are not completely forbidden from speaking within a church since Paul speaks about women prophesying inside the church.

The Council on Biblical Manhood and Womanhood holds that "[i]n the church, redemption in Christ gives men and women an equal share in the blessings of salvation. Nevertheless, they strongly believe that certain governing and teaching roles within the church are restricted to men (1 Cor 14:33–38; 11:2–16; 1 Tim 2:11–15; 1 Timothy 3:1–7).” Most complementarians believe that women should not be ordained as pastors or as evangelists in some cases, while others believe that it is acceptable for women to be evangelists but not pastors. This would not support placing women in top leadership roles in the church or family that would imply or provide any authority over men. Which other specific ministry roles are open to women varies among complementarians.

In his article "Women Preachers, Divorce, and a Gay Bishop–What’s the Link?", Southern Baptist theologian and seminary president Albert Mohler asserts that "The arguments used in support of the ordination of women require the dismissal or 'reinterpretation' of specific biblical texts which disallow women in the teaching office". He believes the same is true of arguments for the ordination of divorced persons and for homosexuals.

Some traditionally Catholic countries have been called matriarchal because of the high value that was placed on women. Numerous women have been beatified and are venerated among the saints. However, the Catholic Church restricts ordination to men, since "The Lord Jesus chose men (viri) to form the college of the twelve apostles, and the apostles did the same when they chose collaborators to succeed them in their ministry".

== Complementarian advocates ==
=== Christian denominations ===
Christian denominations that support some form of gender complementarity, either in church or the home, include many conservative Protestant denominations (as well as many non-denominational Protestant churches), the Catholic Church, and the Eastern Orthodox Church. Some groups that have outlined specific positions include the Southern Baptist Convention, Presbyterian Church in America, Anglican Diocese of Sydney, the Fellowship of Independent Evangelical Churches (Australia), Lutheran Church–Missouri Synod, Roman Catholic Church, Conservative Mennonites, Newfrontiers, Jehovah's Witnesses, Evangelical Free Church of America, Christian and Missionary Alliance, Sovereign Grace Ministries, and the Calvary Chapel movement.

=== Council on Biblical Manhood and Womanhood ===
The Council on Biblical Manhood and Womanhood (CBMW) is the primary evangelical Christian organization that exists to promote the complementarian view of gender issues. CBMW's current president is Denny Burk who is also a professor of Biblical Studies at Boyce Bible College, the undergraduate wing of The Southern Baptist Theological Seminary. The CBMW published a semi-annual academic journal called the Journal for Biblical Manhood & Womanhood.

== Complementarian movements within feminism ==
New feminism is a predominantly Catholic philosophy which emphasizes a belief in an integral complementarity of men and women, rather than the superiority of men over women or women over men.

Difference feminism is a philosophy that stresses that men and women are ontologically different versions of the human being.

== Criticism ==
According to Christians for Biblical Equality (CBE), an organization that adopts a Christian egalitarian approach, complementarianism "sidesteps the question at issue, which is not whether there are beneficial differences between men and women, but whether these differences warrant the inequitable roles, rights, and opportunities prescribed by advocates of gender hierarchy." CBE prefaces their criticism with acknowledgement of some positions they share in common with complementarians: a mutual love for and commitment to Jesus Christ, a commitment to justice as a biblical ideal, a devotion to Scripture as being God-inspired, and a desire to see the world embrace the gospel of Christ. They are divided by worldviews that CBE sees as reflecting the moral teachings of God and their purposes in this world. CBE maintains that these differing views have "enormous consequences". CBE President Mimi Haddad asserts that Christians are divided over patriarchy as they once were over slavery. She characterizes those divisions as different views of the nature, purpose, and value of humanity, all based on gender.

=== Domestic abuse ===
Hierarchy in relationships was isolated as a factor that positively correlates with the acceptance of beliefs that facilitate abuse in a 2018 study by Jensen et al.; gender complementarianism was used as an indicator of hierarchical relations. Critics of complementarianism have argued that it can be abused to uphold abuse and reduces women's ability to hold male abusers accountable. Some have criticized complementarianism as promoting a power imbalance that facilitates abuse. Hannah Paasch, one of the people who started the #ChurchToo hashtag, argues that complementarianism "feeds the rape culture" in aspects of American Christianity influenced by Western secular society. Supporters of complementarian ideas counter that good leadership on the part of males, as demanded by the Bible, precludes and forbids abuse. John Piper argues that complementarianism's prescription of protective male leadership helps protect women from sexual abuse.

== Other religions ==
Differentiation of women's roles on the basis of religious beliefs are not unique to Christianity or Western culture.

=== Rabbinic Judaism ===
Different movements in Rabbinic Judaism, as distinct from Karaite Judaism, have adopted differing views in gender relations. The Lubavitcher Rebbe stated, "In the Divine plan for creation, men and women have distinct, diverse missions. These missions complement each other, and together bring the Divine plan to harmonious fruition. The role of one is neither higher nor lower than the role of the other: they are simply different." Contrasting this, the Reform Jewish movement is entirely egalitarian, both in services and in daily life. In North America, the Conservative movement is likewise predominantly egalitarian. Although egalitarianism has been adopted in services and life by some of Orthodox Jewry, complementarianism continues to be more prevalent in Orthodox communities.

=== Baháʼí Faith ===
The Baháʼí Faith proclaims that equality is not to deny that differences in function between women and men exist but rather to affirm the complementary roles men and women fulfill in the home and society at large. "The world of humanity is possessed of two wings: the male and the female. So long as these two wings are not equivalent in strength, the bird will not fly. Until womankind reaches the same degree as man, until she enjoys the same arena of activity, extraordinary attainment for humanity will not be realized; humanity cannot wing its way to heights of real attainment. When the two wings … become equivalent in strength, enjoying the same prerogatives, the flight of man will be exceedingly lofty and extraordinary".

== See also ==
- Biblical patriarchy
- Christian egalitarianism
- Christian views about women
- Christian views of marriage
- Christian headcovering
- Gender roles in Islam
- Ordination of women
- Rights and obligations of spouses in Islam
- Yin and yang

Related secular:

- Antifeminism
- Family values
- Manosphere
- Masculism
- Separate spheres
