= Recovering Biblical Manhood and Womanhood =

Book edited by John Piper and Wayne Grudem

- Author: John Piper and Wayne Grudem eds.
- Language: English
- Genre: Christianity
- Publisher: Crossway Books
- Publication date: 1st 1991; 2nd 2006
- Publication place: United States
- Media type: Print (Paperback)
- Pages: 576
- ISBN: 978-1-58134-806-4 (2006)
- OCLC: 77531152
- Preceded by: Danvers Statement; What's the Difference?
- Followed by: Biblical Foundations for Manhood and Womanhood

Recovering Biblical Manhood and Womanhood: A Response to Evangelical Feminism (or RBMW) is a collection of articles on gender roles, written from an evangelical perspective, and edited by John Piper and Wayne Grudem. Crossway Books published the book in 1991 for the Council on Biblical Manhood and Womanhood (CBMW). CBMW, an international interdenominational evangelical Christian organisation, has a board and staff committed to a view of gender roles they dub complementarian. Recovering Biblical Manhood and Womanhood won Christianity Today's Book of the Year award in 1992.

== Summary ==
Recovering Biblical Manhood and Womanhood presents its essays in five sections:

1. Vision and Overview (2 essays)
2. Exegetical and Theological Studies (12 essays)
3. Studies from Related Disciplines (5 essays)
4. Applications and Implications (6 essays)
5. Conclusion and Prospect (1 essay)

It also contains two appendices: an essay by Wayne Grudem and the Danvers Statement, and a prefatory essay by John Piper.

== What's the Difference? ==
The first chapter of the book, "A Vision of Biblical Complementarity: Manhood and Womanhood Defined According to the Bible" by Piper, had been published separately as What's the Difference? in 1990. It has since been reprinted multiple times, and a DVD version and study guide for small groups are also available from Crossway.

== 50 Crucial Questions ==
The second chapter of the book, "An Overview of Central Concerns: Questions and Answers" by Piper and Grudem, has been published separately as 50 Crucial Questions: An Overview of Central Concerns about Manhood and Womanhood in 1992.

== See also ==
- Colorado Springs Guidelines
- Complementarianism
