= Christian views on marriage =

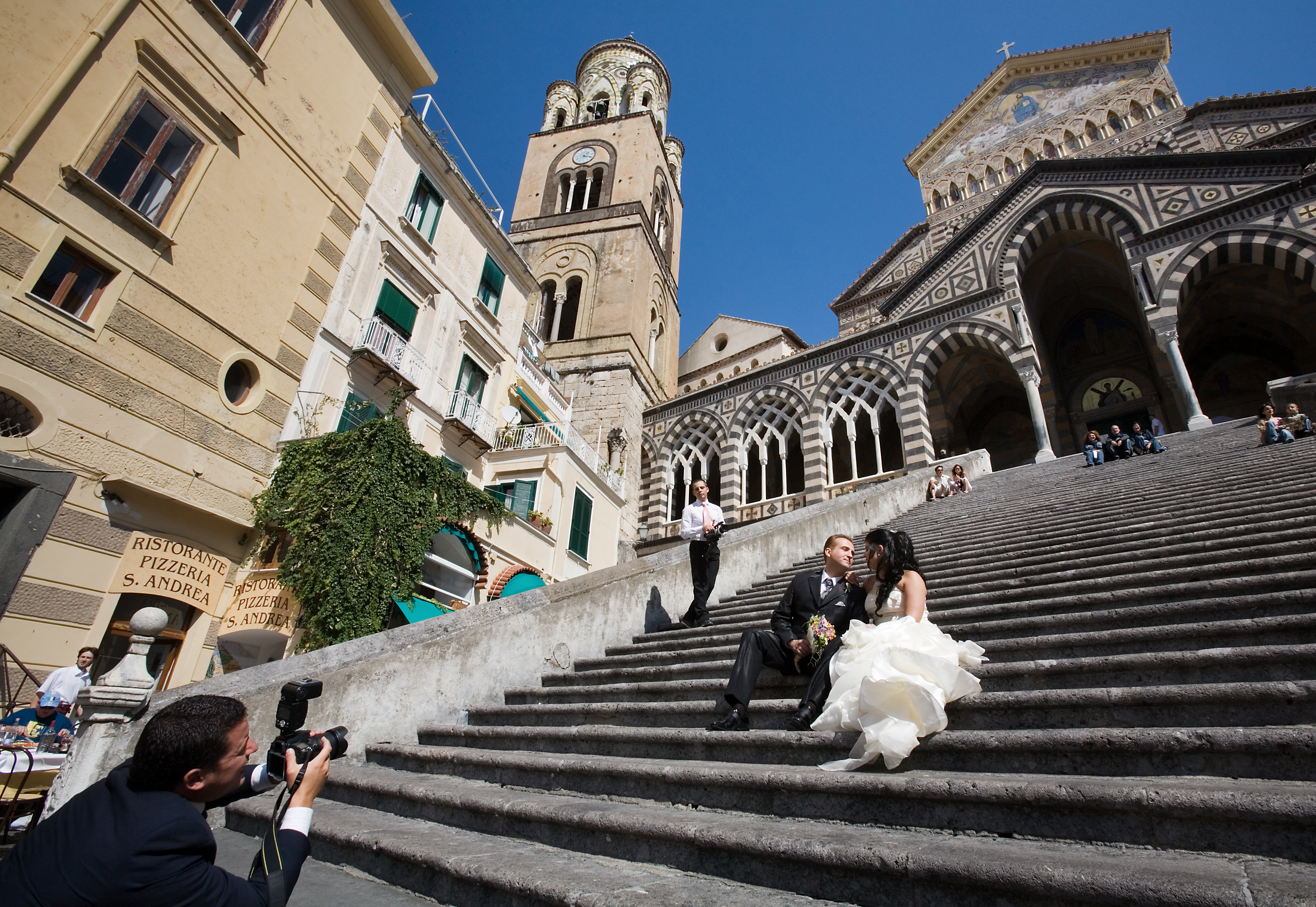
Bride and groom outside a Catholic church in Amalfi, Italy

Christian terminology and theological views of marriage vary by time period, by country, and by the different Christian denominations.

Catholic and Eastern Orthodox Christians consider marriage as a holy sacrament or sacred mystery, while Protestants consider marriage to be a sacred institution or "holy ordinance" of God. However, there have been differing attitudes among denominations and individual Christians towards not only the concept of Christian marriage, but also concerning divorce, remarriage, gender roles, family authority (the "headship" of the husband), the legal status of married women, birth control, marriageable age, cousin marriage, marriage of in-laws, interfaith marriage, same-sex marriage, and polygamy, among other topics, so that in the 21st century there cannot be said to be a single, uniform, worldwide view of marriage among all who profess to be Christians.

Christian teaching has never held that marriage is necessary for everyone; for many centuries in Western Europe, priestly or monastic celibacy was valued as highly as, if not higher than, marriage. Christians who did not marry were expected to refrain from all sexual activity, as were those who took holy orders or monastic vows.

In some Western countries, a separate and secular civil wedding ceremony is required (sometimes compulsory before any religious marriage) for recognition by the state, while in other Western countries, couples must merely obtain a marriage license from a local government authority and can be married by Christian or other clergy if they are authorized by law to conduct weddings. In this case, the state recognizes the religious marriage as a civil marriage as well; and Christian couples married in this way have all the rights of civil marriage, including, for example, divorce, even if their church forbids divorce.

== Biblical foundations and history ==
=== Old Testament ===
Polygyny, or men having multiple wives at once, is one of the most common marital arrangements represented in the Old Testament, yet scholars doubt that it was common among average Israelites because of the wealth needed to practice it. Both the biblical patriarchs and kings of Israel are described as engaged in polygamous relationships. Despite the various polygynous relationships in the Bible, Old Testament scholar Peter Gentry has said that it does not mean that God condones polygyny. He also made note of the various problems that polygynous relationships present with the examples of Abraham, Jacob, David, and Solomon in the Bible. Alternatively, this could be a case of graded absolutism.

Betrothal (erusin), which is merely a binding promise to get married, is distinct from marriage itself (nissu'in), with the time between these events varying substantially. Since a wife was regarded as property in biblical times, the betrothal (erusin) was effected simply by purchasing her from her father (or guardian) (i.e. paying the bride price to the woman and her father); the woman's consent is not explicitly required by any biblical law. Nonetheless, in one Biblical story, Rebecca was asked whether she agreed to be married before the marriage took place. Additionally, according to French anthropologist Philippe Rospabé, the payment of the bride price does not entail the purchase of a woman, as was thought in the early twentieth century. Instead, it is a purely symbolic gesture acknowledging (but never paying off) the husband's permanent debt to the wife's parents.

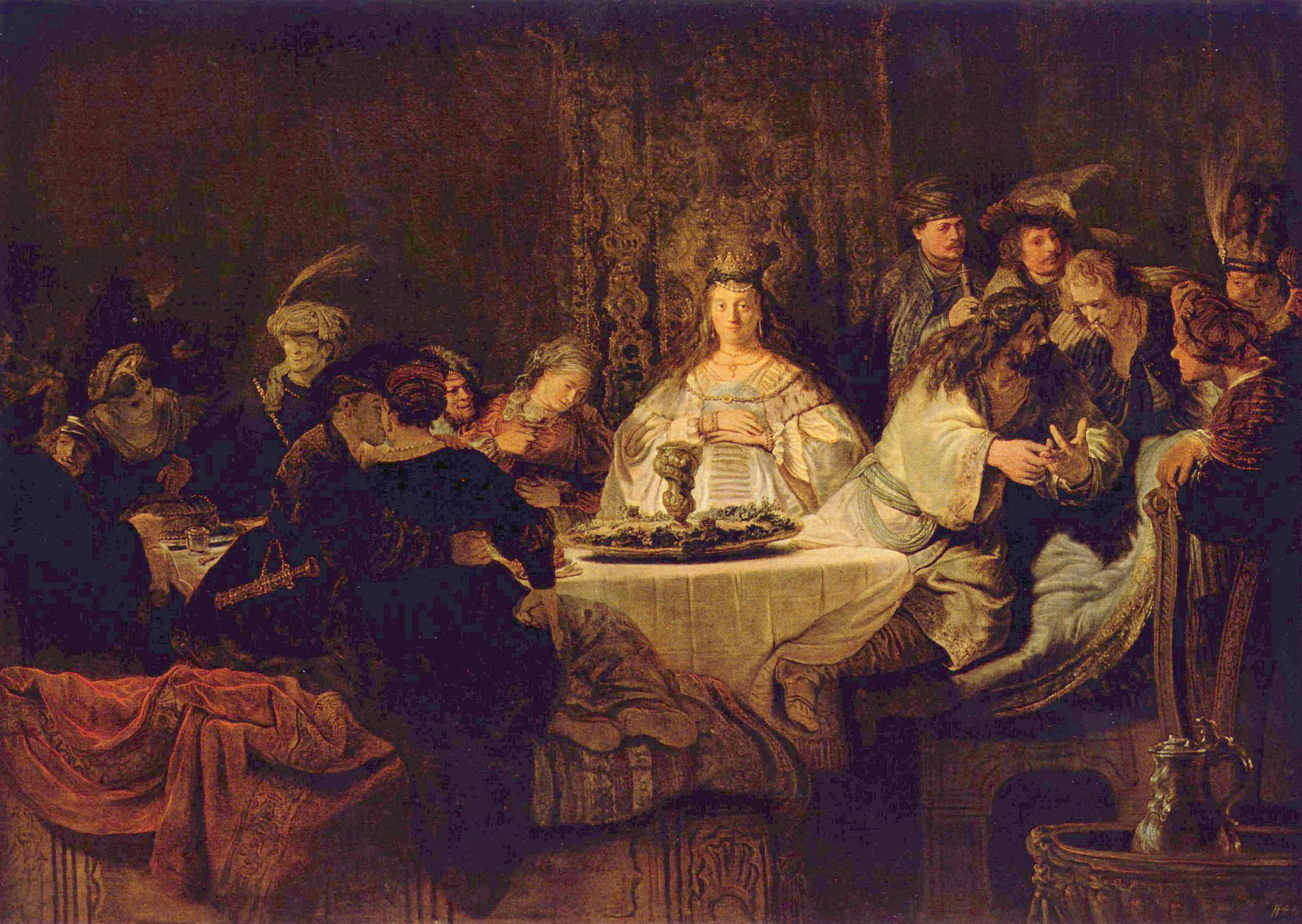
Rembrandt's depiction of Samson's marriage feast

Like the adjacent Arabic culture (in the pre-Islamic period), the act of marriage appears mainly to have consisted of the groom fetching the bride, although among the Israelites the procession was a festive occasion, accompanied by music, dancing, and lights. To celebrate the marriage, week-long feasts were sometimes held.

In Old Testament times, a wife was submissive to her husband, which may be interpreted as Israelite society viewing wives as the chattel of husbands.

Since a wife was regarded as property, her husband was originally free to divorce her with little restriction, at any time.

=== Jesus on marriage, divorce, and remarriage ===
Sometimes used as a symbol for Christian marriage: Two gold wedding rings interlinked with the Greek letters chi (X) and rho (P)—the first two letters in the Greek word for "Christ" (see Labarum)

According to the Vatican as of a time before 2002, marriage vows are unbreakable, so that even in the distressing circumstances in which a couple separates, they are still married from God's point of view. As of at least that time, this is the Catholic church's position, although occasionally the church will declare a marriage to be "null" (in other words, it never really was a marriage). William Barclay (1907–1978) has written:

There is no time in history when the marriage bond stood in greater peril of destruction than in the days when Christianity first came into this world. At that time the world was in danger of witnessing the almost total break-up of marriage and the collapse of the home... Theoretically no nation ever had a higher ideal of marriage than the Jews had. The voice of God had said, "I hate divorce"

— William Barclay

Theologian Frank Stagg says that manuscripts disagree as to the presence in the original text of the phrase "except for fornication". Matthew's exemption for adultery need not be interpreted as contradictory to Mark 10 and Luke 16; Jesus's ban on divorce could have taken for granted that sexual immorality ended marriage. Stagg writes: "Divorce always represents failure...a deviation from God's will.... There is grace and redemption where there is contrition and repentance.... There is no clear authorization in the New Testament for remarriage after divorce." Stagg interprets the chief concern of Matthew 5 as being "to condemn the criminal act of the man who divorces an innocent wife.... Jesus was rebuking the husband who victimizes an innocent wife and thinks that he makes it right with her by giving her a divorce". He points out that Jesus refused to be trapped by the Pharisees into choosing between the strict and liberal positions on divorce as held at the time in Judaism. When they asked him, "Is it lawful for a man to divorce his wife for any cause?" he answered by reaffirming God's will as stated in Genesis, that in marriage husband and wife are made "one flesh", and what God has united man must not separate.

There is no evidence that Jesus himself ever married, and considerable evidence that he remained single. In contrast to Judaism and many other traditions, he taught that there is a place for voluntary singleness in Christian service. He believed marriage could be a distraction from an urgent mission. However, scholars generally agree that the historical Jesus prohibited divorce and remarriage, though the tradition-history of the command remains debated.

=== New Testament beyond the Gospels ===
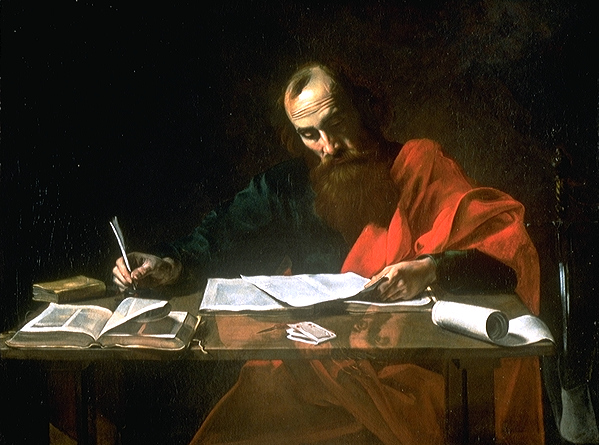
Saint Paul Writing His Epistles, 16th century.

The Apostle Paul quoted passages from Genesis almost verbatim in two of his New Testament books. He used marriage not only to describe the kingdom of God, as Jesus had done, but to define also the nature of the 1st-century Christian church. His theological view was a Christian development of the Old Testament parallel between marriage and the relationship between God and Israel. He analogized the church as a bride and Christ as the bridegroom─drawing parallels between Christian marriage and the relationship between Christ and the Church.

There is no hint in the New Testament that Jesus was ever married, and no clear evidence that Paul was ever married. However, both Jesus and Paul seem to view marriage as a legitimate calling from God for Christians. Paul also attests to the prohibition on divorce also attributed to Jesus in the canonical gospels. Paul's primary issue was that marriage adds concerns to one's life that detract from their ability to serve God without distraction.

Some scholars have speculated that Paul may have been a widower since prior to his conversion to Christianity he was a Pharisee and member of the Sanhedrin, positions in which the social norm of the day required the men to be married. But it is just as likely that he never married at all.

=== Marriage and early Church Fathers ===
Building on what they saw the example of Jesus and Paul advocating, some early Church Fathers placed less value on the family and saw celibacy and freedom from family ties as a preferable state.

Nicene Fathers such as Augustine believed that marriage was a sacrament because it was a symbol used by Paul to express Christ's love of the Church. However, there was also an apocalyptic dimension in his teaching, and he was clear that if everybody stopped marrying and having children that would be an admirable thing; it would mean that the Kingdom of God would return all the sooner and the world would come to an end. Such a view reflects the Manichaean past of Augustine and the influence of Neoplatonism.

While upholding the New Testament teaching that marriage is "honourable in all and the bed undefiled," Augustine believed that "yet, whenever it comes to the actual process of generation, the very embrace which is lawful and honourable cannot be effected without the ardour of lust...This is the carnal concupiscence, which, while it is no longer accounted sin in the regenerate, yet in no case happens to nature except from sin."

Both Tertullian and Gregory of Nyssa were church fathers who were married. They each stressed that the happiness of marriage was ultimately rooted in misery. They saw marriage as a state of bondage that could only be cured by celibacy. They wrote that at the very least, the virgin woman could expect release from the "governance of a husband and the chains of children."

Tertullian argued that second marriage, having been freed from the first by death, "will have to be termed no other than a species of fornication," partly based on the reasoning that this involves desiring to marry a woman out of sexual ardor, which a Christian convert is to avoid.

Also advocating celibacy and virginity as preferable alternatives to marriage, Jerome wrote: "It is not disparaging wedlock to prefer virginity. No one can make a comparison between two things if one is good and the other evil." On First Corinthians 7:1 he reasons, "It is good, he says, for a man not to touch a woman. If it is good not to touch a woman, it is bad to touch one: for there is no opposite to goodness but badness. But if it be bad and the evil is pardoned, the reason for the concession is to prevent worse evil."

St. John Chrysostom wrote: "...virginity is better than marriage, however good.... Celibacy is...an imitation of the angels. Therefore, virginity is as much more honorable than marriage, as the angel is higher than man. But why do I say angel? Christ, Himself, is the glory of virginity."

Cyprian, Bishop of Carthage, said that the first commandment given to men was to increase and multiply, but now that the earth was full there was no need to continue this process of multiplication.

This view of marriage was reflected in the lack of any formal liturgy formulated for marriage in the early Church. No special ceremonial was devised to celebrate Christian marriage—despite the fact that the Church had produced liturgies to celebrate the Eucharist, Baptism and Confirmation. It was not important for a couple to have their nuptials blessed by a priest. People could marry by mutual agreement in the presence of witnesses.

At first, the old Roman pagan rite was used by Christians, although modified superficially. The first detailed account of a Christian wedding in the West dates from the 9th century. This system, known as Spousals, persisted after the Reformation.

== Denominational beliefs and practice ==
=== Catholicism ===
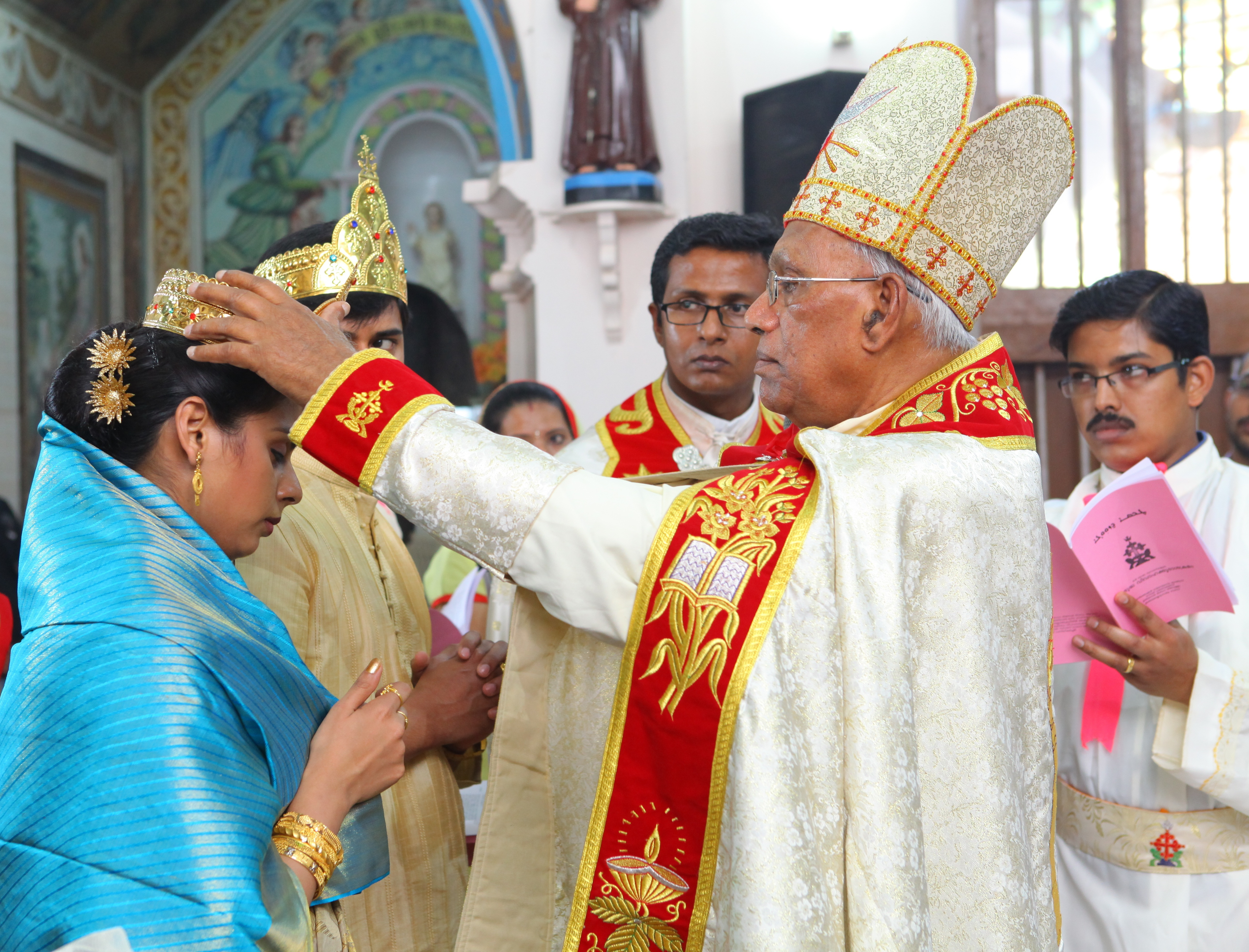
Mystery of Crowning during Holy Matrimony in the Syro-Malabar Catholic Church

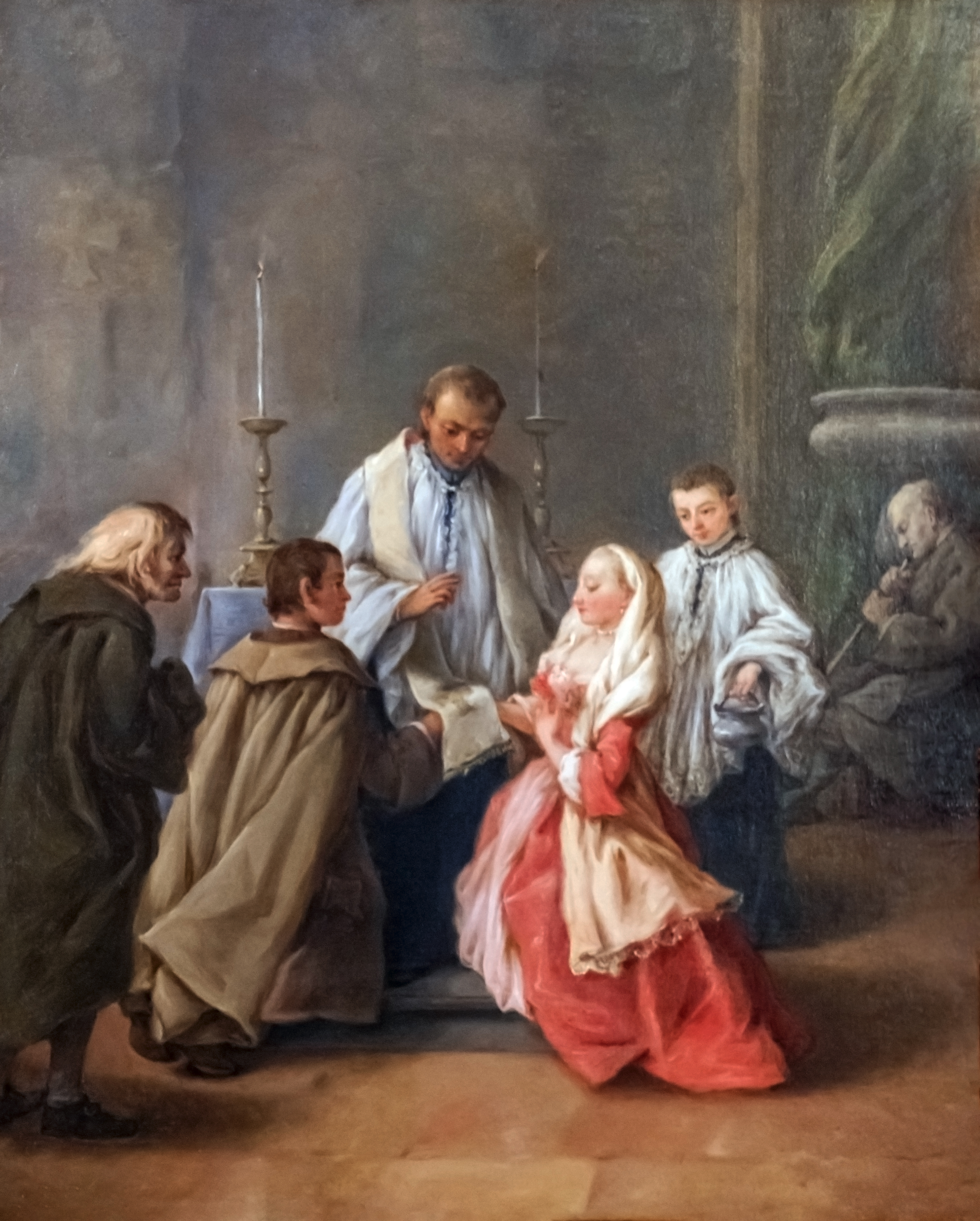
Catholic couple at their Holy Matrimony or marriage. In the Latin liturgical rites of the Catholic Church, during the celebration the priest imposes his liturgical stole upon the couple's hands, as a sign to confirm the marriage bond.

Today all Christian denominations regard marriage as a sacred institution, a covenant. Catholics consider it to be a sacrament. Marriage was officially recognized as a sacrament at the 1184 Council of Verona. Before then, no specific ritual was prescribed for celebrating a marriage: "Marriage vows did not have to be exchanged in a church, nor was a priest's presence required. A couple could exchange consent anywhere, anytime."

In the decrees on marriage of the Council of Trent (twenty-fourth session from 1563), the validity of marriage was made dependent upon the wedding taking place before a priest and two witnesses, although the lack of a requirement for parental consent ended a debate that had proceeded from the 12th century. In the case of a divorce, the right of the innocent party to marry again was denied so long as the other party was alive, even if the other party had committed adultery.

The Catholic Church allowed marriages to take place inside churches only starting with the 16th century, beforehand religious marriages happened on the porch of the church.

The Catholic Church teaches that God himself is the author of the sacred institution of marriage, which is His way of showing love for those He created. Marriage is an eternal sacred institution that can never ever be broken, even if the husband or wife lived separately due to complicated issues but always bound to solved eventually together no matter how challenging it is; as long as they are both alive, the Church considers them bound together by God. Holy Matrimony is another name for sacramental marriage. Marriage is intended to be a faithful, exclusive, lifelong and eternal union of a man and a woman. Committing themselves completely to each other, a Catholic husband and wife strive to sanctify each other, bring children into the world, and educate them in the Catholic way of life. Man and woman, although created differently from each other, complement each other. This complementarity draws them together in a mutually loving union.

The valid marriage of baptized Christians is one of the seven Catholic sacraments. The sacrament of marriage is the only sacrament that a priest does not administer directly; a priest, however, is the chief witness of the husband and wife's administration of the sacrament to each other at the wedding ceremony in a Catholic church.

The Catholic Church views that Christ himself established the sacrament of marriage at the wedding feast of Cana; therefore, since it is a divine institution, neither the Church nor state can alter the basic meaning and structure of marriage. Husband and wife give themselves totally to each other in a union that lasts until death.

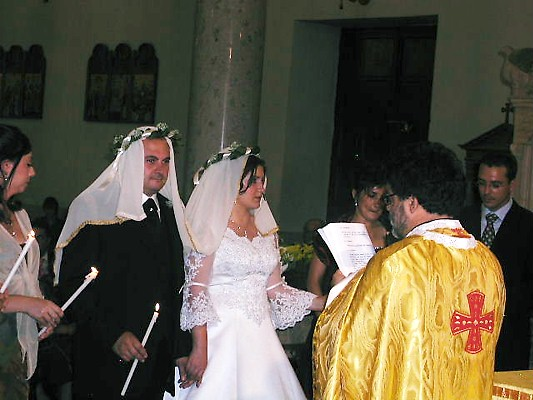
Arbëreshë Albanian couple during marriage in an Italo-Greek Catholic Church rite.

Priests are instructed that marriage is part of God's natural law and to support the couple if they do choose to marry. Today it is common for Catholics to enter into a "mixed marriage" between a Catholic and a baptized non-Catholic. Couples entering into a mixed marriage are usually allowed to marry in a Catholic church provided their decision is of their own accord and they intend to remain together for life, to be faithful to each other, and to have children which are brought up in the Catholic faith.

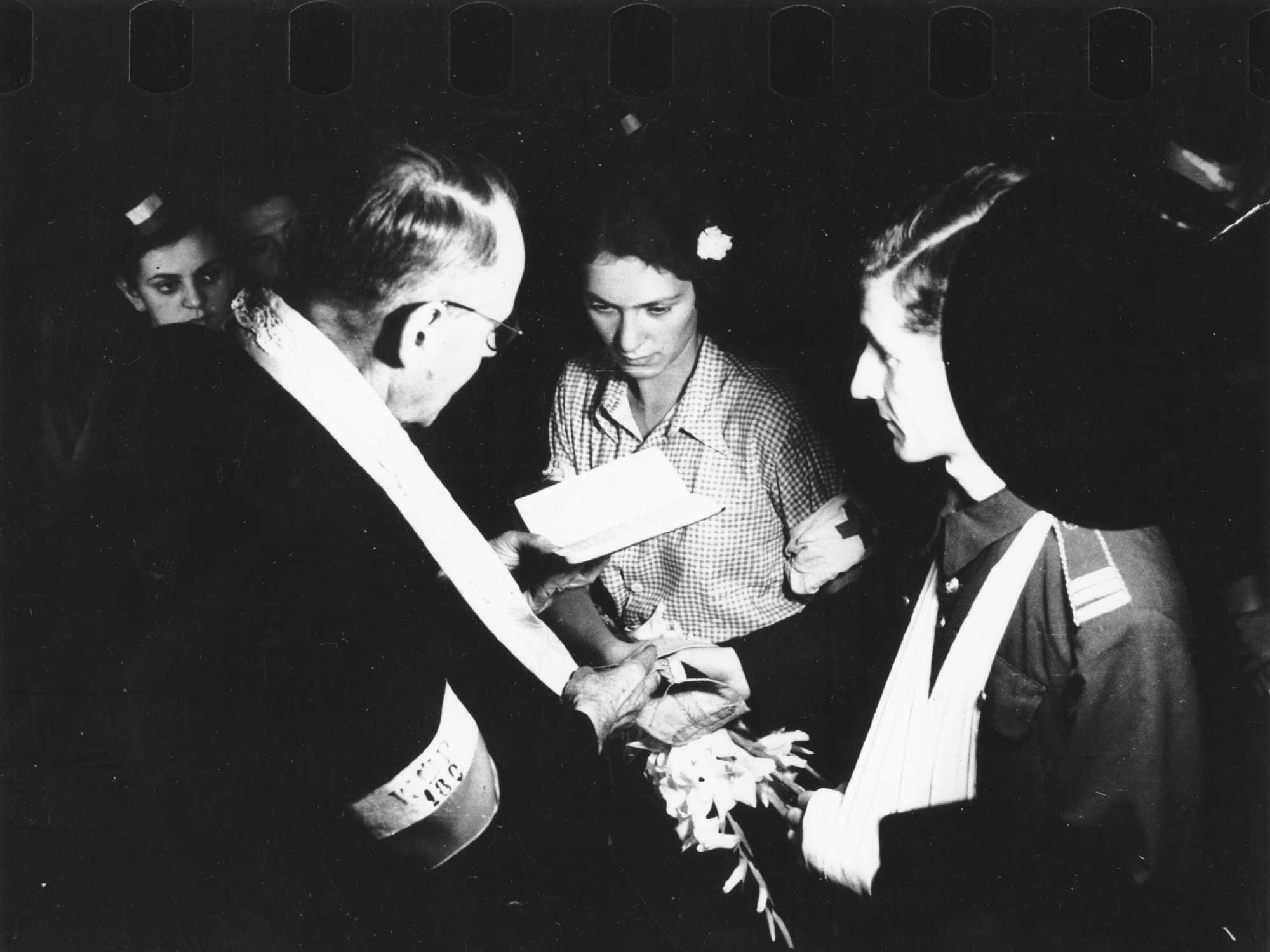
During the Warsaw Uprising (1944), a Polish couple, members of an Armia Krajowa resistance group, are married in a secret Catholic chapel in a street in Warsaw.

In Catholic teaching, marriage has two objectives: the good of the spouses themselves, and the procreation and education of children (1983 code of canon law, c.1055; 1994 catechism, par.2363). Hence "entering marriage with the intention of never having children is a grave wrong and more than likely grounds for an annulment." It is normal procedure for a priest to ask the prospective bride and groom about their plans to have children before officiating at their wedding. The Catholic Church may refuse to marry anyone unwilling to have children, since procreation by "the marriage act" is a fundamental part of marriage. Thus usage of any form of contraception, in vitro fertilization, or birth control besides natural family planning is a grave offense against the sanctity of marriage and ultimately against God.

=== Protestantism ===
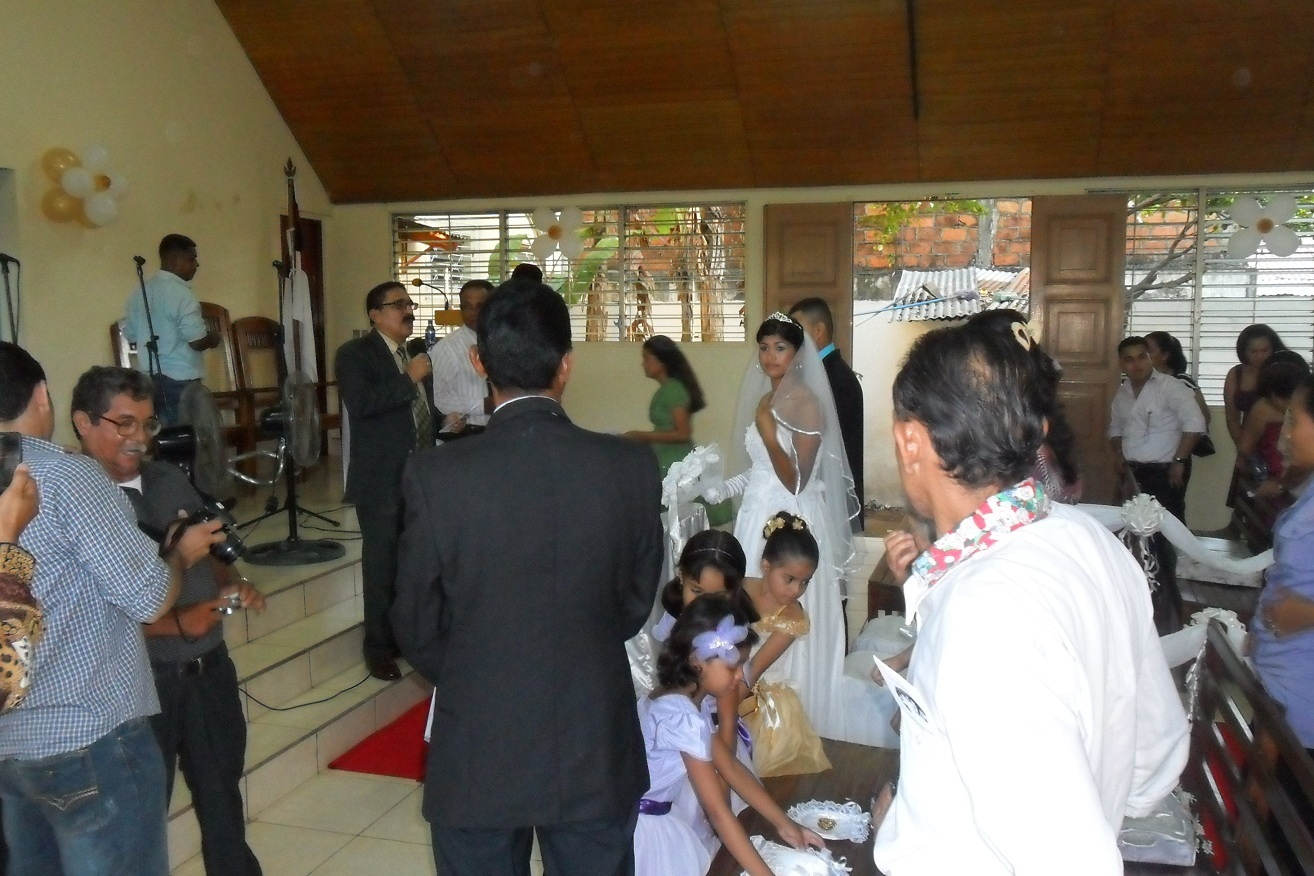
Wedding ceremony at First Baptist Church of Rivas, Baptist Convention of Nicaragua, 2011

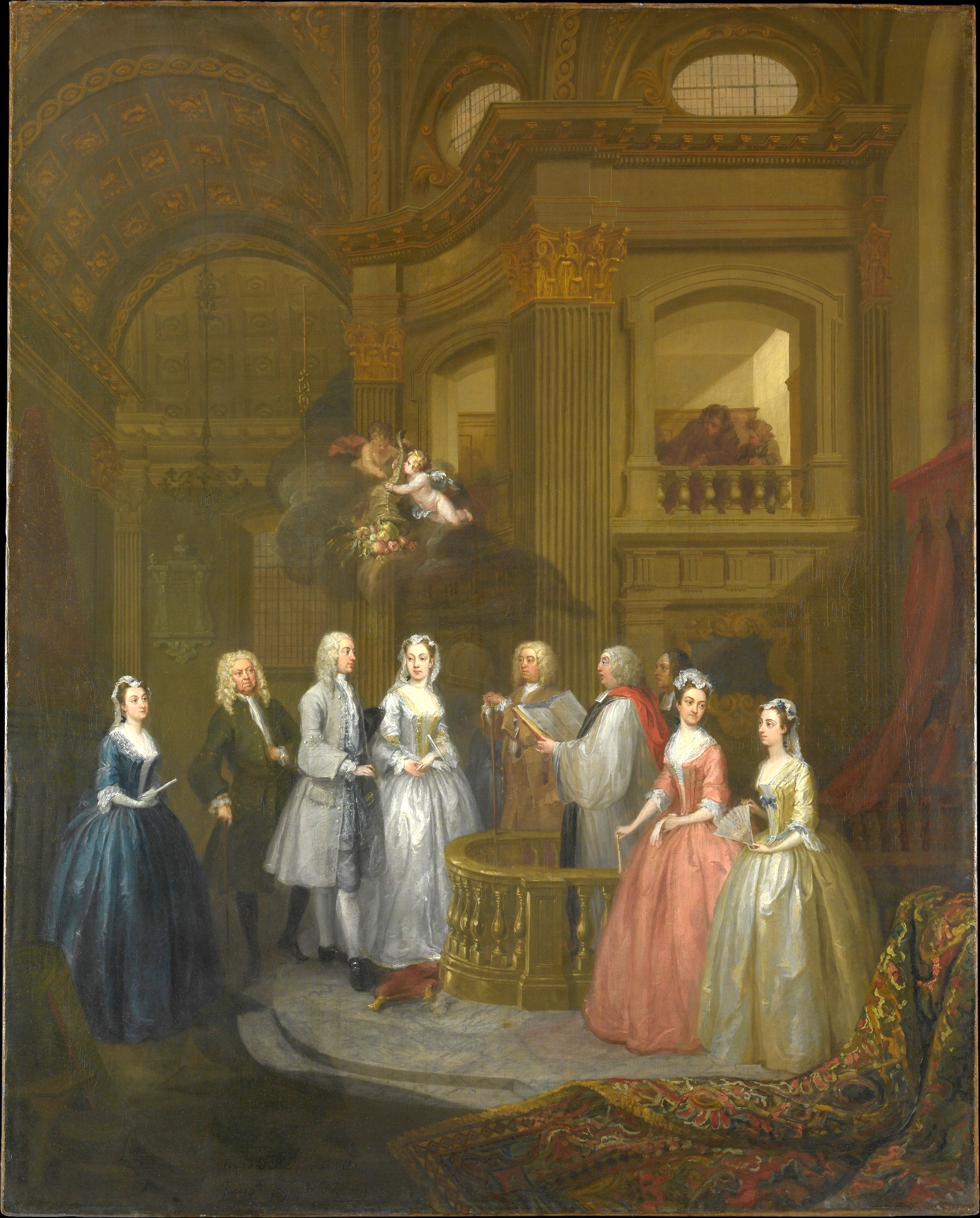
The Wedding of Stephen Beckingham and Mary Cox by William Hogarth, c. 1729 (Metropolitan Museum of Art, N.Y.).

==== Purposes ====
Most Protestant denominations hold marriage to be ordained by God for the union between a man and a woman. They see the primary purposes of this union as intimate companionship, rearing children and mutual support for both husband and wife to fulfill their life callings. Protestant Christian denominations consider marital sexual pleasure to be a gift of God, though they vary on their position on birth control, ranging from the acceptance of the use of contraception to only allowing natural family planning to teaching Quiverfull doctrine—that birth control is sinful and Christians should have large families. Theologically Conservative Protestants consider marriage a solemn covenant between wife, husband and God. Most view sexual relations as appropriate only within a marriage. Protestant Churches discourage divorce though the way it is addressed varies by denomination; for example, the Reformed Church in America permits divorce and remarriage, while other denominations such as the Evangelical Methodist Church Conference forbid divorce except in the case of fornication and do not allow for remarriage in any circumstance.

Many Methodist Christians teach that marriage is "God's gift and covenant intended to imitate God's covenant with humankind" that "Christians enter in their baptism." For example, the rite used in the Free Methodist Church proclaims that marriage is "more than a legal contract, being a bond of union made in heaven, into which you enter discreetly and reverently."

==== Roles and responsibilities ====
Roles and responsibilities of husband and wives now vary considerably on a continuum between the long-held male dominant/female submission view and a shift toward equality (without sameness) of the woman and the man. There is considerable debate among many Christians today—not just Protestants—whether equality of husband and wife or male headship is the biblically ordained view, and even if it is biblically permissible. The divergent opinions fall into two main groups: Complementarians (who call for husband-headship and wife-submission) and Christian Egalitarians (who believe in full partnership equality in which couples can discover and negotiate roles and responsibilities in marriage).

There is no debate that Ephesians 5 presents a historically benevolent husband-headship/wife-submission model for marriage. The questions are (a) how these New Testament household codes are to be reconciled with the calls earlier in Chapter 5 (cf. verses 1, 18, 21) for mutual submission among all believers, and (b) the meaning of "head" in v.23. It is important to note that verse 22 contains no verb in the original manuscripts, which were also not divided into verses:
Ephesians 5 (NIV)

^{1} Follow God's example, therefore, as dearly loved children ^{2} and walk in the way of love....
^{18} be filled with the Spirit....
^{21} Submit to one another out of reverence for Christ.
^{22} Wives, [submit yourselves] to your own husbands as you do to the Lord. ^{23} For the husband is the head of the wife as Christ is the head of the church, his body, of which he is the Savior. ^{24} Now as the church submits to Christ, so also wives should submit to their husbands in everything.
^{25} Husbands, love your wives, just as Christ loved the church and gave himself up for her ^{26} to make her holy, cleansing her by the washing with water through the word, ^{27} and to present her to himself as a radiant church, without stain or wrinkle or any other blemish, but holy and blameless. ^{28} In this same way, husbands ought to love their wives as their own bodies. He who loves his wife loves himself. ^{29} After all, no one ever hated their own body, but they feed and care for their body, just as Christ does the church— ^{30} for we are members of his body. ^{31} "For this reason a man will leave his father and mother and be united to his wife, and the two will become one flesh." ^{32} This is a profound mystery—but I am talking about Christ and the church. ^{33} However, each one of you also must love his wife as he loves himself, and the wife must respect her husband.

=== Eastern Orthodoxy ===
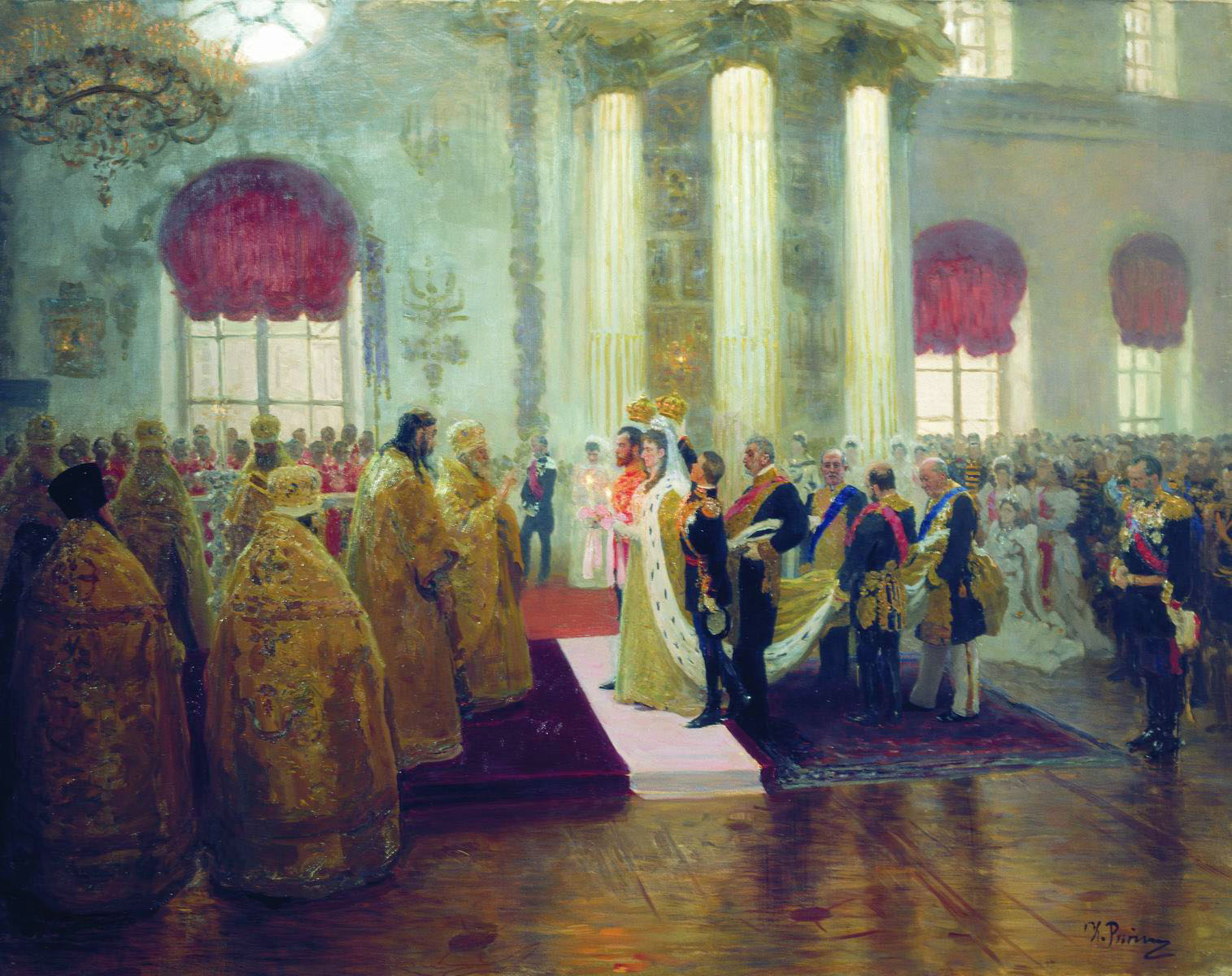
The Wedding of Nicholas II and Grand Duchess Alexandra Feodorovna, by Ilya Yefimovich Repin, 1894 (Russian State Museum, St. Petersburg).

In the Eastern Orthodox Church, marriage is treated as a Sacred Mystery (sacrament), and as an ordination. It serves to unite a woman and a man in eternal union before God. It refers to the 1st centuries of the church, where spiritual union of spouses in the first sacramental marriage was eternal. Therefore, it is considered a martyrdom as each spouse learns to die to self for the sake of the other. Like all Mysteries, Orthodox marriage is more than just a celebration of something which already exists: it is the creation of something new, the imparting to the couple of the grace which transforms them from a 'couple' into husband and wife within the Body of Christ.

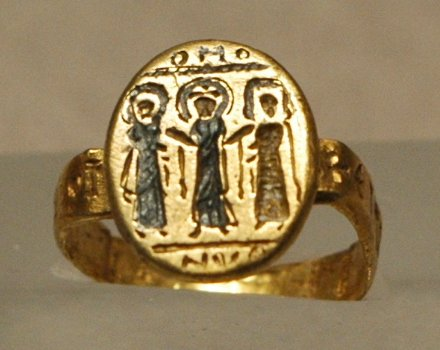
Byzantine wedding ring, depicting Christ uniting the bride and groom, 7th century, nielloed gold (Musée du Louvre).

Marriage is an icon (image) of the relationship between Jesus and the Church. This is somewhat akin to the Old Testament prophets' use of marriage as an analogy to describe the relationship between God and Israel. Marriage is the simplest, most basic unity of the church: a congregation where "two or three are gathered together in Jesus' name." The home is considered a consecrated space (the ritual for the Blessing of a House is based upon that of the Consecration of a Church), and the husband and wife are considered the ministers of that congregation. However, they do not "perform" the Sacraments in the house church; they "live" the Sacrament of Marriage. Because marriage is considered to be a pilgrimage wherein the couple walk side by side toward the Kingdom of Heaven, marriage to a non-Orthodox partner is discouraged, though it may be permitted.

Unlike Western Christianity, Eastern Christians do not consider the sacramental aspect of the marriage to be conferred by the couple themselves. Rather, the marriage is conferred by the action of the Holy Spirit acting through the priest. Furthermore, no one besides a bishop or priest—not even a deacon—may perform the Sacred Mystery.

The external sign of the marriage is the placing of wedding crowns upon the heads of the couple, and their sharing in a "Common Cup" of wine. Once crowned, the couple walk a circle three times in a ceremonial "dance" in the middle of the church, while the choir intones a joyous three-part antiphonal hymn, "Dance, Isaiah"

The sharing of the Common Cup symbolizes the transformation of their union from a common marriage into a sacred union. The wedding is usually performed after the Divine Liturgy at which the couple receives Holy Communion. Traditionally, the wedding couple would wear their wedding crowns for eight days, and there is a special prayer said by the priest at the removal of the crowns.

Divorce is discouraged. Sometimes out of economia (mercy) a marriage may be dissolved if there is no hope whatever for a marriage to fulfill even a semblance of its intended sacramental character. The standard formula for remarriage is that the Orthodox Church joyfully blesses the first marriage, merely performs the second, barely tolerates the third, and invariably forbids the fourth. "On the basis of the ideal of the first marriage as an image of the glory of God the question is which significance such a second marriage has and whether it can be regarded as Mysterion. Even though there are opinions (particularly in the west) which deny the sacramental character to the second marriage, in the orthodox literature almost consistently either a reduced or even a full sacramentality is attributed to it. The investigation of the second marriage rite shows that both positions affirming the sacramentality to a second marriage can be justified."

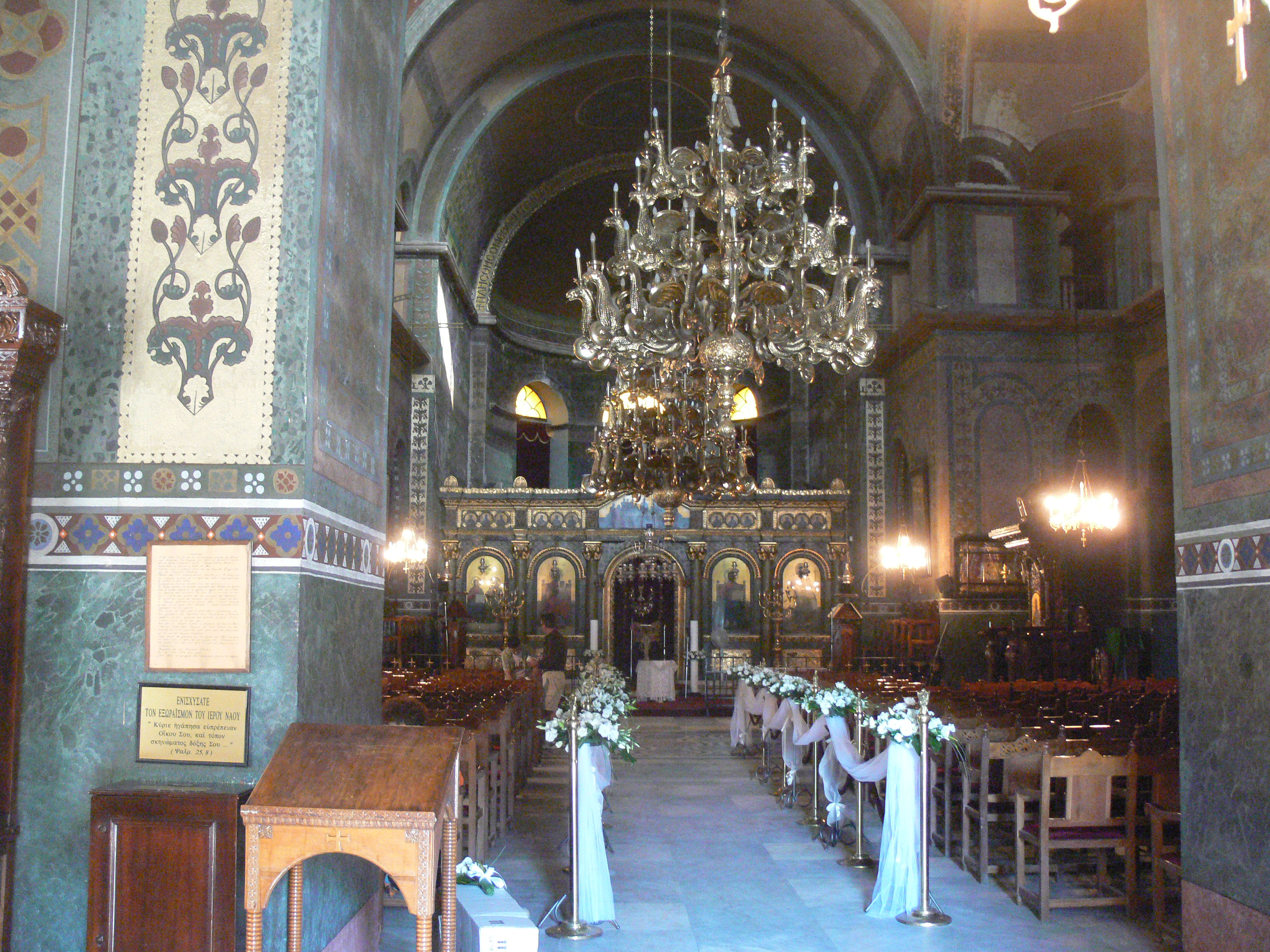
Orthodox Church prepared for a wedding (Hagia Sophia, Thessaloniki.)

Early church texts forbid marriage between an Orthodox Christian and a heretic or schismatic (which would include all non-Orthodox Christians). Traditional Orthodox Christians forbid mixed marriages with other denominations. More liberal ones perform them, provided that the couple formally commit themselves to rearing their children in the Orthodox faith.

All people are called to celibacy—human beings are all born into virginity, and Orthodox Christians are expected by Sacred Tradition to remain in that state unless they are called into marriage and that call is sanctified. The church blesses two paths on the journey to salvation: monasticism and marriage. Mere celibacy, without the sanctification of monasticism, can fall into selfishness and tends to be regarded with disfavour by the Church.

Orthodox priests who serve in parishes are usually married. They must marry prior to their ordination. If they marry after they are ordained they are not permitted to continue performing sacraments. If their wife dies, they are forbidden to remarry; if they do, they may no longer serve as a priest. A married man may be ordained as a priest or deacon. However, a priest or deacon is not permitted to enter into matrimony after ordination. Bishops must always be monks and are thus celibate. However, if a married priest is widowed, he may receive monastic tonsure and thus become eligible for the episcopate.

The Eastern Orthodox Church believes that marriage is an eternal union of spouses, but in Heaven there will not be a procreative bond of marriage.

=== Oriental Orthodoxy ===
The Non-Chalcedonian Churches of Oriental Orthodoxy hold views almost identical to those of the (Chalcedonian) Eastern Orthodox Church. The Coptic Orthodox Church allows second marriages only in cases of adultery or death of spouse.

=== Non-Trinitarian denominations ===
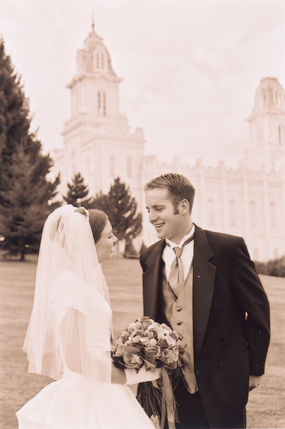
A Celestial Marriage must be performed in an LDS temple.

==== The Church of Jesus Christ of Latter-day Saints ====
In the teachings of the Church of Jesus Christ of Latter-day Saints (LDS Church), celestial (or eternal) marriage is a covenant between a man, a woman, and God performed by a priesthood authority in a temple of the church. Celestial marriage is intended to continue forever into the afterlife if the man and woman do not break their covenants. Thus, eternally married couples are often referred to as being "sealed" to each other. Sealed couples who keep their covenants are also promised to have their posterity sealed to them in the afterlife. (Thus, "families are forever" is a common phrase in the LDS Church.) A celestial marriage is considered a requirement for exaltation.

In some countries, celestial marriages can be recognized as civil marriages; in other cases, couples are civilly married outside of the temple and are later sealed in a celestial marriage. (The church will no longer perform a celestial marriage for a couple unless they are first or simultaneously legally married.) The church encourages its members to be in good standing with it so that they may marry or be sealed in the temple. A celestial marriage is not annulled by a civil divorce: a "cancellation of a sealing" may be granted, but only by the First Presidency, the highest authority in the church. Civil divorce and marriage outside the temple carries somewhat of a stigma in the Mormon culture; the church teaches that the "gospel of Jesus Christ—including repentance, forgiveness, integrity, and love—provides the remedy for conflict in marriage." Regarding marriage and divorce, the church instructs its leaders: "No priesthood officer is to counsel a person whom to marry. Nor should he counsel a person to divorce his or her spouse. Those decisions must originate and remain with the individual. When a marriage ends in divorce, or if a husband and wife separate, they should always receive counseling from Church leaders."

In church temples, members of the LDS Church perform vicarious celestial marriages for deceased couples who were legally married.

==== New Church (or Swedenborgian Church) ====
The New Church teaches that marital love (or "conjugial love") is "the precious jewel of human life and the repository of the Christian religion" because the love shared between a husband and a wife is the source of all peace and joy. Emanuel Swedenborg coined the term "conjugial" (rather than the more usual adjective in reference to marital union, "conjugal") to describe the special love experienced by married partners. When a husband and wife work together to build their marriage on earth, that marriage continues after the deaths of their bodies and they live as angels in heaven into eternity. Swedenborg claimed to have spoken with angelic couples who had been married for thousands of years. Those who never married in the natural world will, if they wish, find a spouse in heaven.

==== Jehovah's Witnesses ====
The Jehovah's Witnesses view marriage to be a permanent arrangement with the only possible exception being adultery. Divorce is strongly discouraged even when adultery is committed since the wronged spouse is free to forgive the unfaithful one. There are provisions for a domestic separation in the event of "failure to provide for one's household" and domestic violence, or spiritual resistance on the part of a partner. Even in such situations though divorce would be considered grounds for loss of privileges in the congregation. Remarrying after death or a proper divorce is permitted. Marriage is the only situation where any type of sexual interaction is acceptable, and even then certain restrictions apply to acts such as oral and anal sex. Married persons who are known to commit such acts may in fact lose privileges in the congregation as they are supposed to be setting a good example to the congregation.

== Interdenominational marriage ==
In Christianity, an interdenominational marriage (also known as an ecumenical marriage) is a marriage between two baptized Christians who belong to different Christian denominations, e.g. a wedding between a Lutheran man and a Catholic woman. Nearly all denominations permit interdenominational marriages.

In Methodism, ¶81 of the 2014 Discipline of the Allegheny Wesleyan Methodist Connection, states with regard to interdenominational marriages: "We do not prohibit our people from marrying persons who are not of our connection, provided such persons have the form and are seeking the power of godliness; but we are determined to discourage their marrying persons who do not come up to this description."

The Catholic Church recognizes as sacramental, (1) the marriages between two baptized Protestants or between two baptized Orthodox Christians, as well as (2) marriages between baptized non-Catholics and Catholics, although in the latter case, consent from the diocesan bishop must be obtained, with this being termed "permission to enter into a mixed marriage". To illustrate (1), for example, "if two Lutherans marry in the Lutheran Church in the presence of a Lutheran minister, the Catholic Church recognizes this as a valid sacrament of marriage." Weddings in which both parties are Catholics are ordinarily held in a Catholic church, while weddings in which one party is a Catholic and the other party is a non-Catholic be held in a Catholic church or a non-Catholic church.

== Interreligious marriage ==
In Christianity, an interfaith marriage is a marriage between a baptized Christian and a non-baptized person, e.g. a wedding between a Christian man and Jewish woman.

In the Presbyterian Church (USA), the local church congregation is tasked with supporting and including an interfaith couple with one being a baptized Presbyterian Christian and the other being a non-Christian, in the life of the Church, "help[ing] parents make and live by commitments about the spiritual nurture of their children", and being inclusive of the children of the interfaith couple. The pastor is to be available to help and counsel the interfaith couple in their life journey.

Although the Catholic Church recognizes as natural marriages weddings between two non-Christians or those between a Catholic and a non-Christian, these are not sacramental, and in the latter case, the Catholic must seek permission from the local bishop for the marriage to occur; this permission is known as "dispensation from disparity of cult".

In Methodist Christianity, the 2014 Discipline of the Allegheny Wesleyan Methodist Connection discourages interfaith marriages, stating "Many Christians have married unconverted persons. This has produced bad effects; they have either been hindered for life, or have turned back to perdition." Though the United Methodist Church authorizes its clergy to preside at interfaith marriages, it notes that Corinthians 6 has been interpreted "as at least an ideal if not an absolute ban on such [interfaith] marriages as an issue of scriptural faithfulness, if not as an issue of Christian survival." At the same time, for those already in an interfaith marriage (including cases in which there is a non-Christian couple and one party converts to Christianity after marriage), the Church notes that Saint Paul "addresses persons married to unbelievers and encourages them to stay married."

== Same-sex marriage ==
According to the book Same-Sex Unions in Pre-Modern Europe, published in 1994 by the American historian John Boswell, despite the lack of legal recognition, the ritual of adelphopoiia celebrated by the Catholic Church until the 14th century and by the Eastern Orthodox Church until the early 20th century, could be considered a blessing of same-sex unions.

Some Christian denominations allow local churches to decide about blessing of same-sex marriage, such as the Episcopal Church in United States the Anglican Church of Canada, the Anglican Church in Aotearoa, New Zealand and Polynesia, the Anglican Episcopal Church of Brazil, the Scottish Episcopal Church in Scotland and mainline Protestant denominations such as the United Church of Christ, the United Church of Canada, the Metropolitan Community Church, the Presbyterian Church (USA), the Quakers, the United Reformed Church in United Kingdom, the Church of Scotland, the Methodist Church of Great Britain, the Church of Iceland, the Church of Sweden, the Church of Denmark, the Church of Norway, the United Protestant Church in Belgium, the Protestant Church in Baden, the Evangelical Lutheran Church in Bavaria, the Evangelical Church in Berlin, Brandenburg and Silesian Upper Lusatia, the Evangelical Church of Bremen, the Evangelical Lutheran Church in Brunswick, the Evangelical Church of Hesse Electorate-Waldeck,the Evangelical Lutheran Church of America, the Evangelical Lutheran Church in Canada, some Lutheran and united churches in Evangelical Church in Germany, and the Protestant Church in the Netherlands, the Evangelical Lutheran Church in Oldenburg, the Evangelical Lutheran Church of Hanover, the Church of Lippe, the Evangelical Reformed Church in Bavaria and Northwestern Germany, the Evangelical Church in the Rhineland, the Protestant Church in Hesse and Nassau, the Evangelical Lutheran Church in Northern Germany the Protestant Church of the Palatinate, the Evangelical Church of Westphalia, the Mennonite Church in the Netherlands the United Protestant Church of France, the Catholic Diocese of the Old Catholics in Germany, the Christian Catholic Church of Switzerland, some Reformed churches in Federation of Swiss Protestant Churches for example the Reformed Church of Aargau, the Protestant Church of Geneva or the Evangelical Reformed Church of the Canton of Zürich, non-trinitarian denominations such as the Unity Church and the Unitarians.

Some international networks of Affirming churches support blessings of same-sex marriage, such the Association of Welcoming and Affirming Baptists, Ecumenical Catholic Church, Metropolitan Community Church, Reconciling Ministries Network (Methodist), The Covenant Network (Pentecostal).

The Eastern Orthodox Church, and some other more theologically conservative Protestant denominations do not perform or recognize same-sex marriage because they do not consider it as marriage at all, and considering any homosexual sexual activity to be sinful. The Global Anglican Future Conference (GAFCON) consisting of the Church of Nigeria, Anglican Church of Kenya, Anglican Church of Tanzania, Rwanda and Uganda; Anglican Church of South America, Australia, parts of England, Canada, USA and Church of India through the Jerusalem Conference clearly asserted "the unchangeable standard of Christian marriage between one man and one woman as the proper place for sexual intimacy."

== Location of the wedding ==
With respect to religion, historic Christian belief emphasizes that Christian weddings should occur in a church as Christian marriage should begin where one also starts their faith journey (Christians receive the sacrament of baptism in church in the presence of their congregation). Catholic weddings must "take place in a church building" as holy matrimony is a sacrament; sacraments normatively occur in the presence of Christ in the house of God, and "members of the faith community [should be] present to witness the event and provide support and encouragement for those celebrating the sacrament". Bishops never grant permission "to those requesting to be married in a garden, on the beach, or some other place outside of the church" and a dispensation is only granted "in extraordinary circumstances (for example, if a bride or groom is ill or disabled and unable to come to the church)". Marriage in the church, for Christians, is seen as contributing to the fruit of the newlywed couple regularly attending church each Lord's Day and raising children in the faith.

== Theological views ==
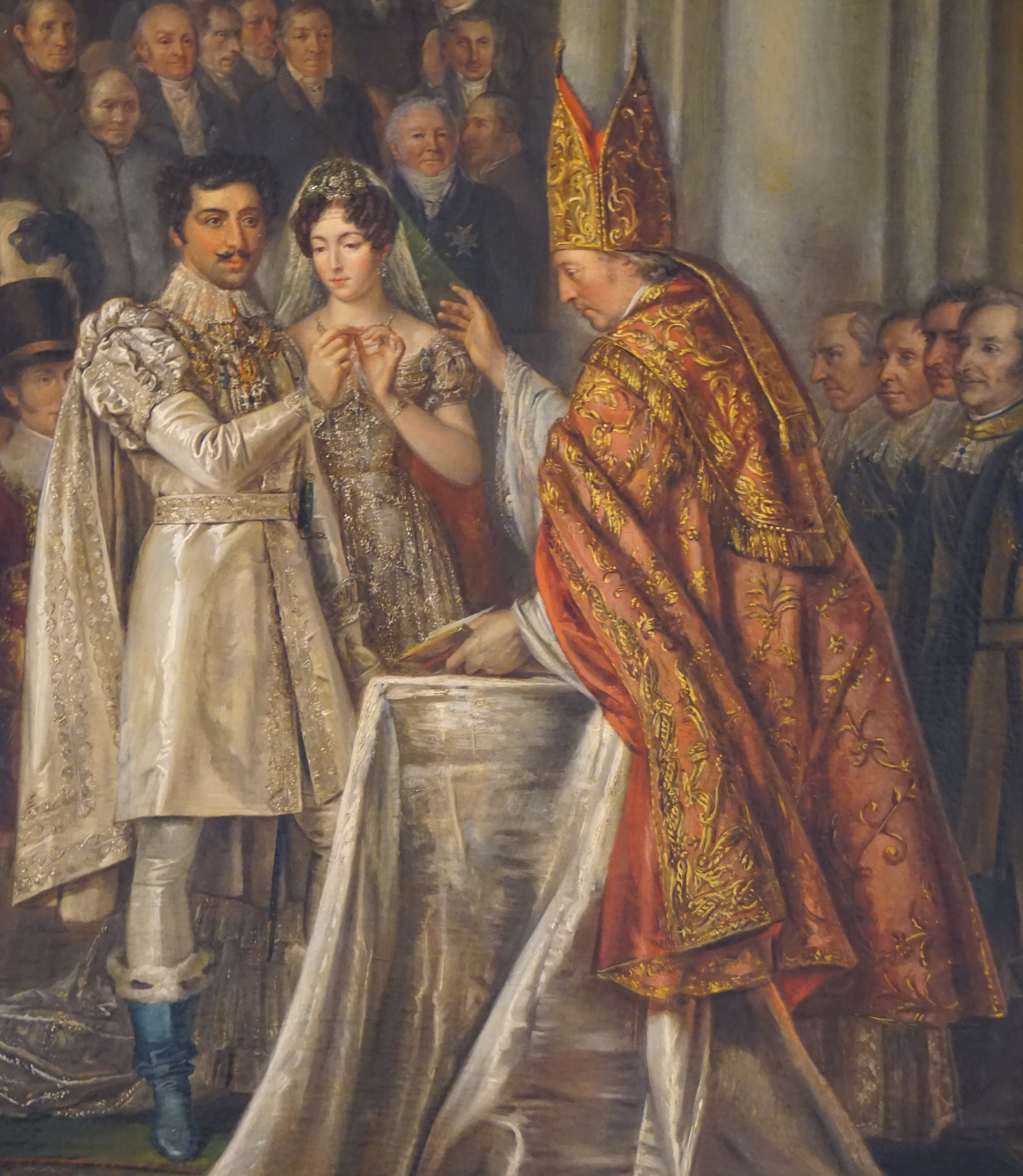
The Nuptial Mass of Oscar I of Sweden and Josephine of Leuchtenberg, presided over by Evangelical-Lutheran Archbishop of Uppsala Carl von Rosenstein (1824)

Christians seek to uphold the seriousness of wedding vows. Yet, Protestants denominations and the Orthodox Church respond with compassion to deep hurts by recognizing that divorce, though less than the ideal, is sometimes necessary to relieve one partner of intolerable hardship, unfaithfulness or desertion. While the voice of God had said, "I hate divorce", some authorities believe the divorce rate in the church is nearly comparable to that of the culture at large. The Catholic Church official doctrine is that divorce is immoral with the exception of its use to protect one or more spouses with the understanding that civil divorce is not an actual divorce in the eyes of God.

Christians today hold three competing views as to what is the biblically ordained relationship between husband and wife. These views range from Christian egalitarianism that interprets the New Testament as teaching complete equality of authority and responsibility between the man and woman in marriage, all the way to Patriarchy that calls for a "return to complete patriarchy" in which relationships are based on male-dominant power and authority in marriage:

1. Christian Egalitarians believe in an equal partnership of the wife and husband with neither being designated as the leader in the marriage or family. Instead, the wife and husband share a fully equal partnership in both their marriage and in the family. Its proponents teach "the fundamental biblical principle of the equality of all human beings before God". This view emphasizes God made Man, male and female, in equal dignity as two modes of being in God's image.

"There is neither Jew nor Gentile, neither slave nor free, nor is there male and female, for you are all one in Christ Jesus."

According to this principle, there can be no moral or theological justification for permanently granting or denying status, privilege, or prerogative solely on the basis of a person's race, class, or gender.

2. Christian Complementarians prescribe husband-headship—a male-led hierarchy. This view's core beliefs call for a husband's "loving, humble headship" and the wife's "intelligent, willing submission" to his headship. They believe women have "different but complementary roles and responsibilities in marriage". This view holds to Genesis 1 that men and women are made in equal dignity yet also emphasizes relational distinctions via St. Paul's teaching that marriage signifies the unity between Christ and his bride the Church, which entails the man is to be like Christ and the woman is to be like the Church.

3. Biblical patriarchy prescribes a strict male-dominant hierarchy. A very strong view makes the husband the ruler over his wife and his household. Their organization's first tenet is that "God reveals Himself as masculine, not feminine. God is the eternal Father and the eternal Son, the Holy Spirit is also addressed as He, and Jesus Christ is a male". They consider the husband-father to be sovereign over his household—the family leader, provider, and protector. They call for a wife to be obedient to her head (her husband) as described in Ephesians 6. One view of this perspective leads to a domination of head over body, male over female. If it is accompanied with equal revelation of the earth described as mother in Wisdom literature, the Church as a she (ecclesia), etc then a second version of this view is the patriarchal-matriarchal view which emphasizes equal dignity, asymmetrical complimentary, each aiming at virtue cultivation, but maintaining the essential head-body metaphor St Paul uses.

Some Christian authorities permit the practice polygamy (specifically polygyny), but this practice, besides being illegal in many Western countries, is now considered to be out of the Christian mainstream in many parts of the globe; the Lutheran World Federation hosted a regional conference in Africa, in which the acceptance of polygamists and their wives into full membership by the Lutheran Church in Liberia was defended as being permissible. While the Lutheran Church in Liberia permits men to retain their wives if they married them prior to being received into the Church, it does not permit polygamists who have become Christians to marry more wives after they have received the sacrament of Holy Baptism.

=== Family authority and responsibilities ===
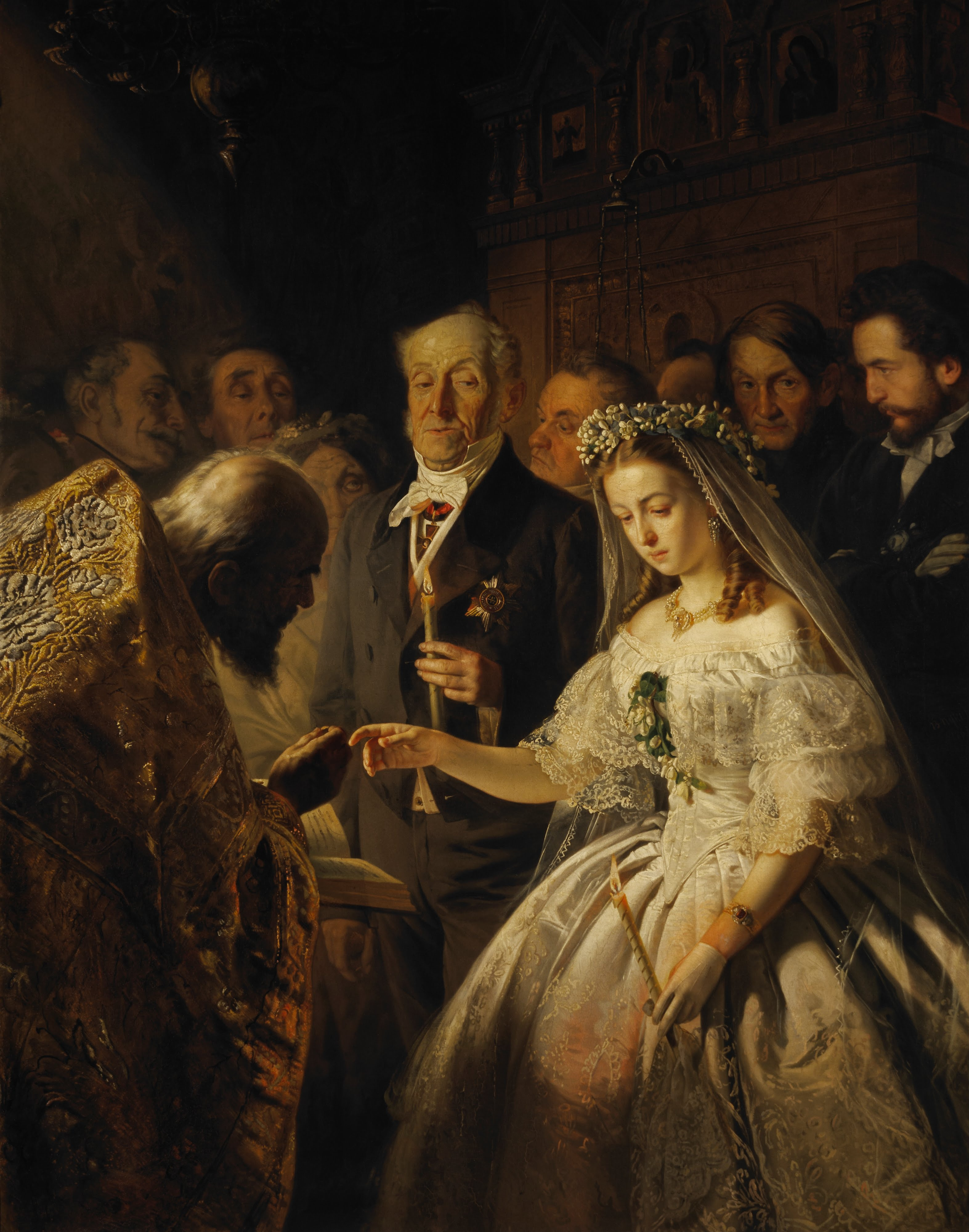
Orthodox betrothal depicted by Vasily Vladimirovich Pukirev, 1862.

Much of the dispute hinges on how one interprets the New Testament household code (Haustafel), a term coined by Martin Luther, which has as its main focus hierarchical relationships between three pairs of social classes that were controlled by Roman law: husbands/wives, parents/children, and masters/slaves. The apostolic teachings, with variations, that constitute what has been termed the "household code" occurs in four epistles (letters) by the Apostle Paul and in 1 Peter.

In the early Roman Republic, long before the time of Christ, the law of manus along with the concept of patria potestas (rule of the fathers), gave the husband nearly absolute autocratic power over his wife, children, and slaves, including the power of life and death. In practice, the extreme form of this right was seldom exercised, and it was eventually limited by law.

Theologian Frank Stagg finds the basic tenets of the code in Aristotle's discussion of the household in Book 1 of Politics and in Philo's Hypothetica 7.14. Serious study of the New Testament Household Code (Haustafel) began with Martin Dilbelius in 1913, with a wide range of studies since then. In a Tübingen dissertation, by James E. Crouch concludes that the early Christians found in Hellenistic Judaism a code which they adapted and Christianized.

The Staggs believe the several occurrences of the New Testament household code in the Bible were intended to meet the needs for order within the churches and in the society of the day. They maintain that the New Testament household code is an attempt by Paul and Peter to Christianize the concept of family relationships for Roman citizens who had become followers of Christ. The Staggs write that there is some suggestion in scripture that because Paul had taught that they had newly found freedom "in Christ", wives, children, and slaves were taking improper advantage of the Haustafel both in the home and the church. "The form of the code stressing reciprocal social duties is traced to Judaism's own Oriental background, with its strong moral/ethical demand but also with a low view of woman.... At bottom is probably to be seen the perennial tension between freedom and order.... What mattered to (Paul) was 'a new creation' and 'in Christ' there is 'not any Jew not Greek, not any slave nor free, not any male and female'.

Two of these Christianized codes are found in Ephesians 5 (which contains the phrases "husband is the head of the wife" and "wives, submit to your husband") and in Colossians 3, which instructs wives to subordinate themselves to their husbands.

The importance of the meaning of "head" as used by the Apostle Paul is pivotal in the conflict between the Complementarian position and the Egalitarian view. The word Paul used for "head", transliterated from Greek, is kephalē. Today's English word "cephalic" (/səˈfælɪk/ sə-FAL-ik) stems from the Greek kephalē and means "of or relating to the head; or located on, in, or near the head." A thorough concordance search by Catherine Kroeger shows that the most frequent use of "head" (kephalē) in the New Testament is to refer to "the anatomical head of a body". She found that its second most frequent use in the New Testament was to convey the metaphorical sense of "source". Other Egalitarian authors such as Margaret Howe agree with Kroeger, writing that "The word 'head' must be understood not as 'ruler' but as 'source'".

Wayne Grudem criticizes commonly rendering kephalē in those same passages only to mean "source", and argues that it denotes "authoritative head" in such texts as Corinthians 11. They interpret that verse to mean that God the Father is the authoritative head over the Son, and in turn Jesus is the authoritative head over the church, not simply its source. By extension, they then conclude that in marriage and in the church, the man is the authoritative head over the woman.

Another potential way to define the word "head", and hence the relationship between husband and wife as found in the Bible, is through the example given in the surrounding context in which the word is found. In that context the husband and wife are compared to Christ and his church. The context seems to imply an authority structure based on a man sacrificing himself for his wife, as Christ did for the church; a love-based authority structure, where submission is not required but freely given based on the care given to the wife.

Some biblical references on this subject are debated depending on one's school of theology. The historical grammatical method is a hermeneutic technique that strives to uncover the meaning of the text by taking into account not just the grammatical words, but also the syntactical aspects, the cultural and historical background, and the literary genre. Thus references to a patriarchal Biblical culture may or may not be relevant to other societies. What is believed to be a timeless truth to one person or denomination may be considered a cultural norm or minor opinion to another.

=== Egalitarian view ===
Christian Egalitarians (from the French word "égal" meaning "equal") believe that Christian marriage is intended to be a marriage without any hierarchy—a full and equal partnership between the wife and husband. They emphasize that nowhere in the New Testament is there a requirement for a wife to obey her husband. While "obey" was introduced into marriage vows for much of the church during the Middle Ages, its only New Testament support is found in Peter 3, with that only being by implication from Sarah's obedience to Abraham. Scriptures such as Galatians 3:28 state that in Christ, right relationships are restored and in him, "there is neither Jew nor Greek, slave nor free, male nor female."

Christian Egalitarians interpret scripture to mean that God intended spouses to practice mutual submission, each in equality with the other. The phrase "mutual submission" comes from a verse in Ephesians 5 which precedes advice for the three domestic relationships of the day, including slavery. It reads, "Submit to one another ('mutual submission') out of reverence for Christ", wives to husbands, children to parents, and slaves to their master. Christian Egalitarians believe that full partnership in marriage is the most biblical view, producing the most intimate, wholesome, and reciprocally fulfilling marriages.

The Christian Egalitarian view of marriage asserts that gender, in and of itself, neither privileges nor curtails a believer's gifting or calling to any ministry in the church or home. It does not imply that women and men are identical or undifferentiated, but affirms that God designed men and women to complement and benefit one another. A foundational belief of Christian Egalitarians is that the husband and wife are created equally and are ordained of God to "become one", a biblical principle first ordained by God in Genesis 2, reaffirmed by Jesus in Matthew 19 and Mark 10, and by the Apostle Paul in Ephesians 5. Therefore, they see that "oneness" as pointing to gender equality in marriage. They believe the biblical model for Christian marriages is therefore for the spouses to share equal responsibility within the family—not one over the other nor one under the other.

David Dykes, theologian, author, and pastor of a 15,000-member Baptist church, sermonized that "When you are in Christ, you have full equality with all other believers". In a sermon he entitled "The Ground Is Level at the Foot of the Cross", he said that some theologians have called one particular Bible verse the Christian Magna Carta. The Bible verse reads: "There is neither Jew nor Gentile, neither slave nor free, nor is there male and female, for you are all one in Christ Jesus." Acknowledging the differences between men and women, Dykes writes that "in Christ, these differences don't define who we are. The only category that really matters in the world is whether you are in Christ. At the cross, Jesus destroyed all the made-made barriers of hostility:" ethnicity, social status, and gender.

The Galatians 3 passage comes after the apostle Paul tells us he would not submit to what was "hypocritical" to the Gospel. The apostle Peter had affirmed the truth of the Gospel regarding the Gentiles with his words, but his actions compromised it.

Those of the egalitarian persuasion point to the biblical instruction that all Christian believers, irrespective of gender, are to submit or be subject "to one another in the fear of God" or "out of reverence for Christ". Gilbert Bilezikian writes that in the highly debated Ephesians 5 passage, the verb "to be subject" or "to be submitted" appears in verse 21 which he describes as serving as a "hinge" between two different sections. The first section consists of verses 18–20, verse 21 is the connection between the two, and the second section consists of verses 22–33. When discussion begins at verse 22 in Ephesians 5, Paul appears to be reaffirming a chain of command principle within the family. However,

...when interpretation begins with verse 21, the entire passage describes mutual submission within the family. The wife submits to her husband in everything "as unto the Lord." If her husband makes a request unworthy of her Lord, her primary loyalty is "unto the Lord." ...Instruction about submission is four times longer for husbands than for wives. The greatest burden of submission is clearly placed on the husband.

Advocates of Christian egalitarianism believe that this model has firm biblical support:

- The word translated "help" or "helper" in Genesis 2 until quite recently was generally understood to subordinate a wife to her husband. The KJV translates it as God saying, "I will make a help meet for him". The first distortion was extrabiblical: the noun "help" and the adjective "meet" traditionally have been combined into a new noun, "helpmate". Thus, wives were often referred to as her husband's "helpmate". Next, from the word "help" were drawn inferences of authority/subjection distinctions between men and women. "Helper" was taken to mean that husband was boss and wife his domestic. It is now realized that of the 21 times the Hebrew word 'ezer is used in the Old Testament, in eight of those instances the term clearly means "savior"—another word for Jehovah God. For example, Psalm 33 says "the Lord...is our help ('ezer) and shield". Psalm 121 reads "I lift up my eyes to the mountains—where does my help ('ezer) come from? My help ('ezer) comes from the Lord, the Maker of heaven and earth." That Hebrew word is not used in the Bible with reference to any subordinate person such a servant. Thus, forms of 'ezer in the Hebrew Bible can mean either "to save" or "to be strong" or have the idea of power and strength.
- The "two becoming one" concept, first cited in Genesis 2, was quoted by Jesus in his teachings on marriage and recorded almost identically in the gospels of both Matthew and Mark. In those passages Jesus reemphasized the concept by adding a divine postscript to the Genesis passage: "So, they are no longer two, but one" (NIV).
- The Apostle Paul also quoted the Genesis 2:24 passage in Ephesians 5 Describing it as a "profound mystery", he analogizes it to "Christ and the church". Then Paul states that every husband must love his wife as he loves himself.
- Jesus actually forbids any hierarchy of relationships in Christian relationships. All three synoptic gospels record virtually the same teaching of Jesus, adding to its apparent significance:
- The Apostle Paul calls on husbands and wives to be subject to each other out of reverence for Christ—mutual submission.
- As persons, husband and wife are of equal value. There is no priority of one spouse over the other. In truth, they are one. Bible scholar Frank Stagg and Classicist Evelyn Stagg write that husband-wife equality produces the most intimate, wholesome and mutually fulfilling marriages. They conclude that the Apostle Paul's statement, sometimes called the "Magna Carta of Humanity" and recorded in Galatians 3, applies to all Christian relationships, including Christian marriage: "There is neither Jew nor Greek, there is neither bond nor free, there is neither male nor female: for you are all one in Christ Jesus."
- The Apostle Peter calls husbands and wives "joint heirs of the grace of life" and cautions a husband who is not considerate to his wife and does not treat her with respect that his prayers will be hindered.
- Each of the six times Aquila and his wife Priscilla are mentioned by name in the New Testament, they are listed together. Their order of appearance alternates, with Aquila mentioned first in the first, third and fifth mentions, and Priscilla (Prisca) first in the other three. Some revisions of the Bible put Priscilla first, instead of Aquila, in Acts 18:26, following the Vulgate and a few Greek texts. Some scholars suggest that Priscilla was the head of the family unit.
- Among spouses, it is possible to submit without love, but it is impossible to love without submitting mutually to each other.

The egalitarian paradigm leaves it up to the couple to decide who is responsible for what task or function in the home. Such decisions should be made rationally and wisely, not based on gender or tradition. Examples of a couple's decision logic might include:

- which spouse is more competent for a particular task or function;
- which has better access to it;
- or if they decide both are similarly competent and have comparable access, they might make the decision based on who prefers that function or task, or conversely, which of them dislikes it less than the other. The egalitarian view holds that decisions about managing family responsibilities are made rationally through cooperation and negotiation, not on the basis of tradition (e.g., "man's work" or "woman's" work), nor any other irrelevant or irrational basis.

=== Complementarian view ===
Complementarians hold to a hierarchical structure between husband and wife. They believe men and women have different gender-specific roles that allow each to complement the other, hence the designation "Complementarians". The Complementarian view of marriage holds that while the husband and wife are of equal worth before God, husbands and wives are given different functions and responsibilities by God that are based on gender, and that male leadership is biblically ordained so that the husband is always the senior authority figure. They state they "observe with deep concern" "accompanying distortions or neglect of the glad harmony portrayed in Scripture between the intelligent, humble leadership of redeemed husbands and the loving, willing support of that leadership by redeemed wives". They believe "the Bible presents a clear chain of authority—above all authority and power is God; God is the head of Christ. Then in descending order, Christ is the head of man, man is the head of woman, and parents are the head of their children." Complementarians teach that God intended men to lead their wives as "heads" of the family. Wayne Grudem, in an article that interprets the "mutual submission" of Ephesians 5 as being hierarchical, writes that it means "being considerate of one another, and caring for one another's needs, and being thoughtful of one another, and sacrificing for one another."

Scriptures such as 1 Corinthians 11:3: "But I would have you know, that the head of every man is Christ; and the head of the woman is the man; and the head of Christ is God", (KJV) is understood as meaning the wife is to be subject to her husband, if not unconditionally.

According to Complementarian authors John Piper, Wayne Grudem, and others, historically, but to a significantly lesser extent in most of Christianity today, the predominant position in both Catholicism and conservative Protestantism places the male as the "head" in the home and in the church. They hold that women are commanded to be in subjection to male leadership, with a wife being obedient to her head (husband), based upon Old and New Testament precepts and principles. This view holds that, "God has created men and women equal in their essential dignity and human personhood, but different and complementary in function with male headship in the home and in the Church."

Grudem also acknowledges exceptions to the submission of wives to husbands where moral issues are involved. Rather than unconditional obedience, Complementarian authors such as Piper and Grudem are careful to caution that a wife's submission should never cause her to "follow her husband into sin."

Catholic Church teaching on the role of women includes that of Pope Leo XIII in his 1880 encyclical Arcanum which states:

The husband is the chief of the family and the head of the wife. The woman, because she is flesh of his flesh, and bone of his bone, must be subject to her husband and obey him; not, indeed, as a servant, but as a companion, so that her obedience shall be wanting in neither honor nor dignity. Since the husband represents Christ, and since the wife represents the Church, let there always be, both in him who commands and in her who obeys, a heaven-born love guiding both in their respective duties." This position was affirmed in the 1930 encyclical Casti Connubii, which invokes Ephesians 5:22, "Let women be subject to their husbands as to the Lord, because the husband is the head of the wife, and Christ is the head of the Church.

Though each of their churches is autonomous and self-governed, the official position of the Southern Baptist Convention (the largest Protestant denomination in the United States) is:

The husband and wife are of equal worth before God, since both are created in God's image. A husband is to love his wife as Christ loved the church. He has the God-given responsibility to provide for, to protect, and to lead his family. A wife is to submit herself graciously to the servant leadership of her husband even as the church willingly submits to the headship of Christ. She, being in the image of God as is her husband and thus equal to him, has the God-given responsibility to respect her husband and to serve as his helper in managing the household and nurturing the next generation."

=== Biblical patriarchy ===
The patriarchal model of marriage is clearly the oldest one. It characterized the theological understanding of most Old Testament writers. It mandates the supremacy, at times the ultimate domination, of the husband-father in the family. In the first century Roman Empire, in the time of Jesus, Paul, and Peter, it was the law of the land and gave the husband absolute authority over his wife, children, and slaves—even the power of life or death. It subordinates all women.

Biblical patriarchy is similar to Complementarianism but with differences of degree and emphasis. Biblical patriarchists carry the husband-headship model considerably further and with more militancy. While Complementarians also hold to exclusively male leadership in both the home and the church, Biblical patriarchy extends that exclusion to the civic sphere as well, so that women should not be civil leaders and indeed should not have careers outside the home.

Patriarchy is based on authoritarianism—complete obedience or subjection to male authority as opposed to individual freedom. Patriarchy gives preeminence to the male in essentially all matters of religion and culture. It explicitly deprives all women of social, political, and economic rights. The marriage relationship simply reinforced this dominance of women by men, providing religious, cultural, and legal structures that clearly favor patriarchy to the exclusion of even basic human dignity for wives.

Historically in classical patriarchy, the wives and children were always legally dependent upon the father, as were the slaves and other servants. It was the way of life throughout most of the Old Testament, religiously, legally, and culturally. However, it was not unique to Hebrew thought. With only minor variations, it characterized virtually every pagan culture of that day—including all Pre-Christian doctrine and practice.

While Scripture allowed this approach in Old Testament times, nowhere does the Bible ordain it. In the Hebrew nation, patriarchy seems to have evolved as an expression of male dominance and supremacy, and of a double standard that prevailed throughout much of the Old Testament. Its contemporary advocates insist that it is the only biblically valid model for marriage today. They argue that it was established at Creation, and thus is a firm, unalterable decree of God about the relative positions of men and women.

Biblical patriarchists see what they describe as a crisis of this era being what they term to be a systematic attack on the "timeless truths of biblical patriarchy". They believe such an attack includes the movement to "subvert the biblical model of the family, and redefine the very meaning of fatherhood and motherhood, masculinity, femininity, and the parent and child relationship." Arguing from the biblical presentation of God revealing himself "as masculine, not feminine", they believe God ordained distinct gender roles for man and woman as part of the created order. They say "Adam's headship over Eve was established at the beginning, before sin entered the world". Their view is that the male has God-given authority and mandate to direct "his" household in paths of obedience to God. They refer to man's "dominion" beginning within the home, and a man's qualification to lead and ability to lead well in the public square is based upon his prior success in ruling his household.

Thus, William Einwechter refers to the traditional Complementarian view as "two-point Complementarianism" (male leadership in the family and church), and regards the biblical patriarchy view as "three-point" or "full" complementarianism (male leadership in family, church and society).

The patriarchists teach that "the woman was created as a helper to her husband, as the bearer of children, and as a "keeper at home", concluding that the God-ordained and proper sphere of dominion for a wife is the household. Biblical patriarchists consider that "faithfulness to Christ requires that (Biblical patriarchy) be believed, taught, and lived". They claim that the "man is...the image and glory of God in terms of authority, while the woman is the glory of man". They teach that a wife is to be obedient to her "head" (husband), based upon Old Testament teachings and models.

=== Other views ===
See Christian feminism

== See also ==
- Biblical patriarchy
- Christian egalitarianism
- Christian views of women
- Christian views on divorce
- Complementarianism
- Christian views on birth control
- Gender roles in Christianity
- Interfaith marriage
- Marriage in the Catholic Church
- Monogamy in Christianity
- New Testament household codes
- Paul the Apostle and women
- Polygamy in Christianity
- Quaker wedding
- Quiverfull
- Wedding
