= Interfaith marriage in Christianity =

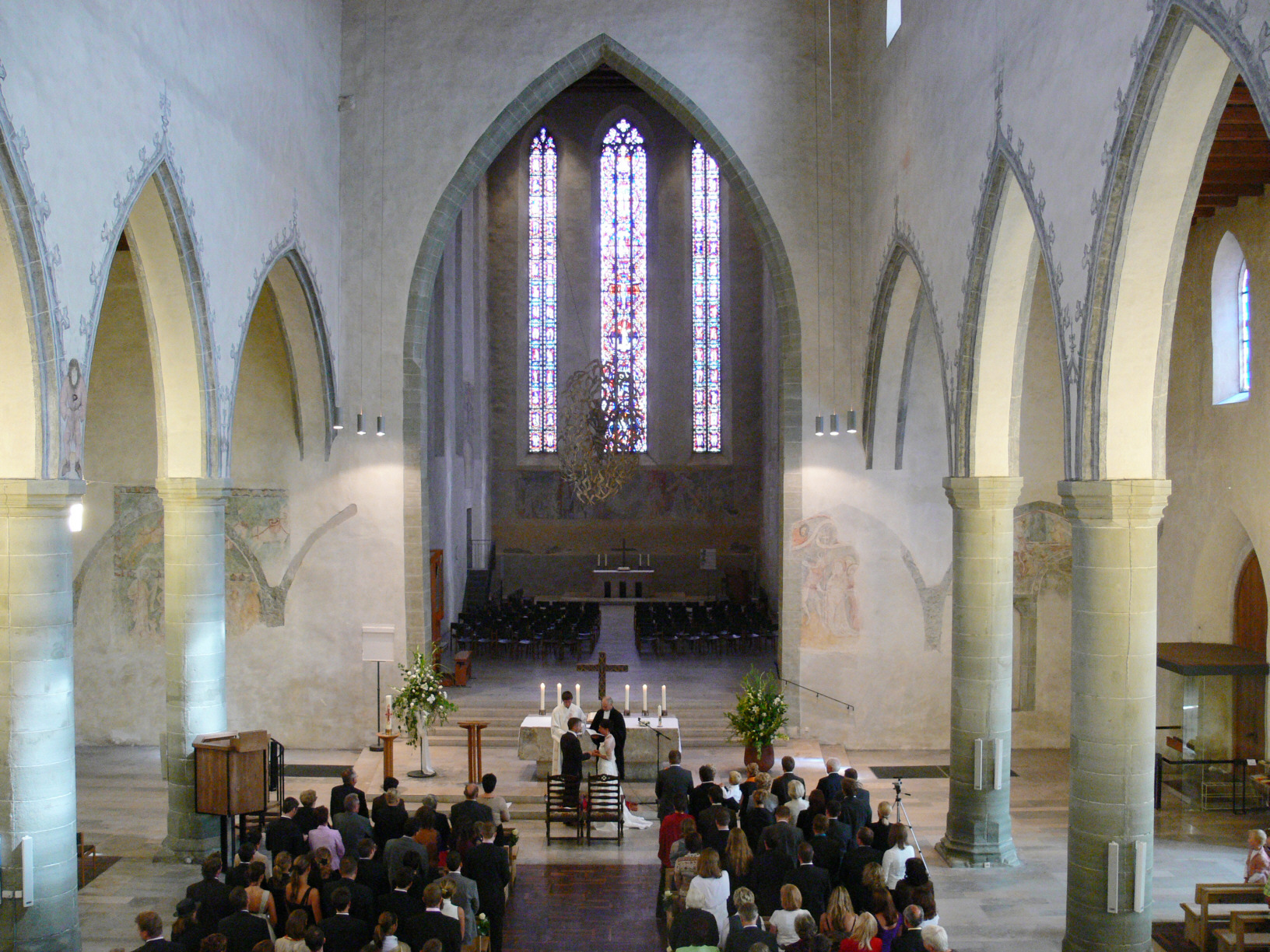
A Lutheran priest in Germany marries a young couple in a church.

An interfaith marriage, also known as an interreligious marriage, is defined by Christian denominations as a marriage between a Christian and a non-Christian (e.g. a marriage between a Christian and a Jew, or a Muslim), whereas an interdenominational marriage is between members of two different Christian denominations, such as a Lutheran Christian wedding a Catholic Christian, for example.

Almost all Christian denominations permit interdenominational marriages, though with respect to interfaith marriage, many Christian denominations caution against it, citing verses of the Christian Bible that prohibit it such as 2 Corinthians 6:14–15, while certain Christian denominations have made allowances for interfaith marriage, which is referenced in 1 Corinthians 7:14–15, verses where Saint Paul addresses originally non-Christian couples in which one of the spouses converts to Christianity after the marriage between two originally non-Christian persons had already taken place. The early Christian Synod of Elvira prohibited interreligious marriage, teaching that "such marriages lead to the adultery of the soul."

Certain Christian denominations, such as the Allegheny Wesleyan Methodist Connection, discourage or prohibit interfaith marriage, basing this caution on passages from the Christian Bible, such as New Testament verses 2 Corinthians 6:14–15 and the Old Testament verses Deuteronomy 7:3 and Ezra 9–10. At the same time, for those already in an interfaith marriage or in the case where one party in a non-Christian couple converts to Christianity, they encourage couples to stay wed. Christian denominations, such as the Catholic Church and Presbyterian Church, offer guidelines with respect to interfaith marriages in which a baptized Christian wishes to marry a non-baptized person.

== Inter-denominational marriages ==
In Christianity, an interdenominational marriage refers to a wedding between two baptized Christians who belong to different Christian denominations, for example a Christian marriage between a Lutheran Christian and a Catholic Christian.

In Methodism, ¶81 of the 2014 Discipline of the Allegheny Wesleyan Methodist Connection, states with regard to interdenominational marriages: "We do not prohibit our people from marrying persons who are not of our connection, provided such persons have the form and are seeking the power of godliness; but we are determined to discourage their marrying persons who do not come up to this description."

The Catholic Church recognizes as sacramental, (1) the marriages between two baptized Protestants or between two baptized Orthodox Christians, as well as (2) marriages between baptized non-Catholic Christians and Catholic Christians, although in the latter case, consent from the diocesan bishop must be obtained, with this termed "permission to enter into a mixed marriage". To illustrate (1), for example, "if two Lutherans marry in the Lutheran Church in the presence of a Lutheran minister, the Catholic Church recognizes this as a valid sacrament of marriage." On the other hand, although the Catholic Church recognizes marriages between two non-Christians or those between a Catholic Christian and a non-Christian, these are not considered to be sacramental, and in the latter case, the Catholic Christian must seek permission from his/her bishop for the marriage to occur; this permission is known as "dispensation from disparity of cult".

The Catholic Church requires a dispensation for mixed marriages. The Catholic party's ordinary (typically a bishop) has the authority to grant them. The baptized non-Catholic partner does not have to convert. Previously (under Ne Temere) the non-Catholic had to agree to raise any children Catholic, but under current rules only the Catholic spouse must promise to do all that is in his or her power to do so. The non-Catholic partner must be made "truly aware" of the meaning of the Catholic party's promise. It is forbidden to have a second religious ceremony or one ceremony performed together by ministers of different faiths. However, it is possible to waive the requirement of form (by granting a dispensation), so that for example one ceremony performed by the minister of another denomination or a civil magistrate will be sufficient. Marriages with members of Eastern Orthodox Churches are valid but illicit without proper observance of the form or dispensation from it, as long as a sacred minister is present and other canonical requirements are observed.

== Inter-religious marriages ==
The early Christian Synod of Elvira prohibited interreligious marriage "no matter how few eligible men there are, for such marriages lead to the adultery of the soul." The Church of the East, in the Council of Seleucia-Ctesiphon in AD 410, ruled that "Christian women should not marry across religious boundaries" though it allowed for Christian men to marry "women of all nations" (neshē men kul 'ammin) in order that Christian men would "instruct them in the ways of Christianity." The cultural context at the time was that a couple's children would follow the religion of the father. The Council of Elvira forbade Christian parents who permitted their daughters to marry nonbelievers to receive Holy Communion, "even at the time of death".

In the Presbyterian Church (USA), the local church congregation is tasked with supporting and including the interfaith couple in the life of the Church, "help[ing] parents make and live by commitments about the spiritual nurture of their children", and being inclusive of the children of the interfaith couple. The pastor is to be available to help and counsel the interfaith couple in their life journey.

In the Roman Catholic Church, marriages between a Catholic Christian and an unbaptized person are not sacramental and fall under the impediment of disparity of worship. They are invalid without a dispensation, for which authority has been given by the Pope to the ordinary of the territory where the marriage takes place. The 1954–1959 Faculties for Mixed Marriages, which are given by the Pope, allow bishops to dispense for mixed marriages, except in the cases where the non-Catholic Christian party is a Muslim because of the danger of the Catholic Christian spouse and their potential children defecting from the Church. In addition, the Catholic Church recognizes the Pauline privilege, wherein a Catholic may marry an unbaptized previously married person who consents to convert, but only if the unbaptized person's spouse refuses to become a baptized Christian also. In 2009, Portuguese Cardinal Jose Policarpo discouraged Portuguese girls from marrying Muslims, due to the fact that it is sometimes difficult to raise children in the faith after a marriage.

The father of Methodist Christianity, John Wesley, taught:

Above all, we should tremble at the very thought of entering into a marriage-covenant, the closest of all others, with any person who does not love or at least fear God. This is the most horrid folly, the most deplorable madness, that a child of God could possibly plunge into; as it implies every sort of connexion with the ungodly which a Christian is bound in conscience to avoid. No wonder, then, it is so flatly forbidden of God; that the prohibition is so absolute and peremptory: "Be not unequally yoked with an unbeliever." Nothing can be more express.

Wesley outlined the questions that one should ask her prospective life partner:

Is the person a believer? Is he a Methodist? Is he a member of our Society? Is he clear with regard to the doctrine of Perfection? Is he athirst for it? If he fails in any of these particulars, I fear he would be an hindrance to you rather than a help.

The 2014 Discipline of the Allegheny Wesleyan Methodist Connection discourages interfaith marriages, stating "Many Christians have married unconverted persons. This has produced bad effects; they have either been hindered for life, or have turned back to perdition." Though the United Methodist Church authorizes its clergy to preside at interfaith marriages, it notes that 2 Corinthians 6:14 has been interpreted "as at least an ideal if not an absolute ban on such [interfaith] marriages as an issue of scriptural faithfulness, if not as an issue of Christian survival." At the same time, for those already in an interfaith marriage (including cases in which there is a non-Christian couple and one party converts to Christianity after marriage), the Church notes that Saint Paul "addresses persons married to unbelievers and encourages them to stay married (see 1 Corinthians 7:12–16)." The Wesleyan Holiness Association of Churches teaches that "For a Christian to marry an unbeliever is unscriptural. If one does marry an unconverted party and trouble follows, he/she cannot blame God for his/her wrongdoing but must expect to pay the penalty, for the marriage covenant is morally binding so long as both live and, therefore, may not be dissolved at will (1 Corinthians 7:39)."

== See also ==
- Christian views on marriage
- Disparity of worship
- Synod of Elvira
- Christian views on sin
