= New Testament household code =

New Testament household duty lists

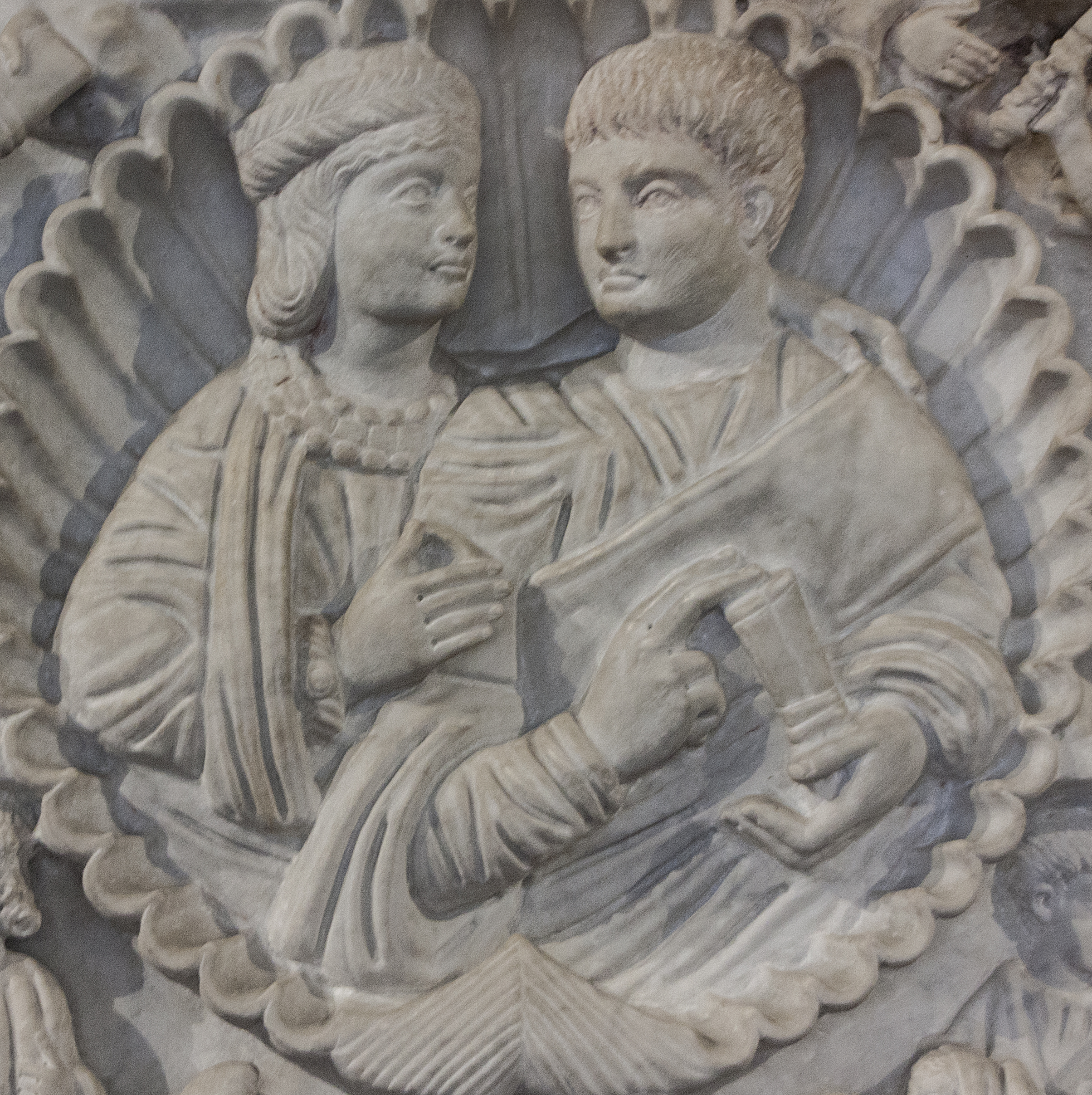
Sarcophagus of Adelphia, depicting a Christian husband and wife

The New Testament household code (German: Haustafeln) are New Testament exhortations that set reciprocal duties for wives and husbands, children and parents, and slaves and masters. They occur in Colossians 3:18–4:1, Ephesians 5:21–6:9, and 1 Peter 2:13–3:7, with Ephesians elaborating Colossians; related "congregational" guidance appears in 1 Timothy and Titus. The term originates from Haustafel which derives from Martin Luther's Small Catechism (1529), which popularized the idea of divinely ordered roles within the home.

Scholars trace the form to Greco-Roman and Hellenistic-Jewish instruction on oikonomia ("household management"), including Aristotle’s analysis of master/slave, husband/wife, and father/child relations, and parallels in Philo and Josephus. Similar Christian lists appear in early writings such as 1 Clement 21:6–8, Polycarp's Philippians 4:2–3, the Didache 4:9–11, and the Epistle of Barnabas 19:5–7.

Many read the codes as pastoral and apologetic: they present Christians as orderly while constraining household heads and addressing subordinate members as moral agents (e.g., mutual submission in Eph 5:21, sacrificial love in 5:25–33, non-provocation in 6:4, and a ban on threats in 6:9). Modern debate centers on gender, authority, and slavery.

== Name ==
The term itself derives from the loose translation of the heading Haustafel used by Martin Luther in the second appendix of his Small Catechism (1529), which helped popularize the concept of divinely ordained social roles within the household.

The concept finds its linguistic and cultural antecedent in the Greek notion of οἰκονομία (household management), a compound of οἶκος (house) and νέμω (to manage). In Greco-Roman society, the household (oikos) was widely regarded as the fundamental building block of social and political order, and numerous ancient writers produced literature on its proper management. New Testament household codes are thus seen as early Christian engagements with this larger Hellenistic conversation, reinterpreted "in light of the Gospel."

Similar codes appear in early Christian writings outside the New Testament, including the 1 Clement (21:6–8), the Epistle of Polycarp to the Philippians (4:2–3), the Didache (4:9–11), and the Epistle of Barnabas (19:5–7), though these have received less scholarly attention.

In contemporary discussion, the New Testament household codes have become a subject of intense debate among Christians, serving as a focal point for controversies concerning the roles of men and women within the family, and especially the interpretation of submission in modern contexts.

== Appearance ==
=== New Testament text ===
New Testament household codes (Haustafeln) first appear in Colossians 3:18–4:1, 1 Peter 2:13–3:7, and Ephesians 5:21–6:9, with Ephesians elaborating on Colossians. The Pastoral Epistles, notably 1 Timothy and Titus, later serve as "congregational codes" for house-church communities.

==== Colossians ====
Often treated as the earliest concise Christian code, Colossians 3:18–4:1 presents the three dyads in brief: wives "as is fitting in the Lord" (3:18), husbands loving and not embittered (3:19), children obeying because it pleases the Lord (3:20), fathers not provoking (3:21), slaves serving with sincerity "fearing the Lord" and "from the soul" (3:22–25), and masters granting what is "just and fair" (4:1) because they too have a Master in heaven. Theocentric motives and fairness language reframe familiar Roman expectations and provide the template Ephesians elaborates.

==== 1 Peter ====
In 1 Peter 2:13–3:12 the household instructions are embedded in a broader call to public peaceability, honor everyone and the emperor (2:13–17). Slaves are exhorted to endure unjust suffering patterned on Christ (2:18–25), linking household ethics to Christology. Wives are urged to conduct that might win unbelieving husbands "without a word" (3:1–6), counter to the custom that wives adopt their husbands' gods; husbands must live considerately, honoring wives as co-heirs, lest their prayers be hindered (3:7). The tone is apologetic and integrative: respectable conduct aims to reduce suspicion toward Christian communities.

==== Ephesians ====
Ephesians 5:21–6:9 frames the entire code with mutual submission (5:21), from which the wives' exhortation in 5:22 syntactically depends. Wives are addressed "as to the Lord" (5:22–24, 33), while husbands are commanded to love self-sacrificially "as Christ loved the church" (5:25–33), making Christ–church and marriage mutually interpretive; this union is called a "great mystery" (5:32), influential in later sacramental reflection. Children obey "in the Lord" (6:1–3), fathers must not provoke but nurture (6:4), slaves serve "as to Christ" (6:5–8), and masters must "do the same" and cease threatening (6:9), explicitly curbing coercive power. Subordinate members are addressed first as moral agents, while heads of household receive constraints grounded in Christ.

== New Testament household codes ==
=== Background ===
Over the past century, scholars have traced close parallels, especially for Colossians, to Greco-Roman moralists and Hellenistic-Jewish writers. Martin Dibelius emphasized the influence of Stoicism, while others highlight similarities to authors such as Philo and Josephus. Stagg argues that women's public roles in the time of Jesus were more restricted than in the Old Testament period, and he locates the codes' stress on reciprocal duties within Jewish moral tradition, read against Paul's tension between "freedom" and "order" and his vision of the "new creation" in which ethnic, social, and gender distinctions do not ground status in Christ (Galatians 6:15; Galatians 3:28).

Commentators frequently set the New Testament "household codes" beside Aristotle's analysis of the oikos (family unit) in Politics I, which structures household management around three dyads: master/slave, husband/wife, and father/child. Balch argues that Ephesians and Colossians intentionally use Aristotle's pattern as a way to organize Christian moral advice. Stagg traces the basic principles behind the New Testament Household Codes to Aristotle’s discussion of the household in Politics and to the Hellenistic-Jewish moral tradition, especially Philo's Hypothetica 7.14. Stagg reads the New Testament passages as attempts to preserve church and social order against unrestrained or excessive uses of Christian "freedom," especially among groups previously restricted by household hierarchies, such as women and slaves.

=== Proposed purposes and functions ===
MacDonald argues that the use of the household code, especially in Ephesians, was meant to ease tensions between members of the Christian community and outsiders. Gombis reviews scholarship on the Ephesian code and notes a common view that its main purpose is apologetic: Paul presents Christians as following proper social order to avoid suspicion that the movement threatens the stability of the Roman Empire. He cites Keener, who notes that groups accused of undermining Roman morals sometimes created "household lists" to show they followed traditional values and fit into accepted social norms. This was a way to defend themselves against accusations and prove their respectability within Roman society.

Stagg explains that much of the household code material appears in the Pauline tradition because, following Paul's statement in Galatians 3:28 about unity in Christ beyond social distinctions, early Christian communities were working out how to balance freedom and social order. On this reading, the household instructions reflect a recurring effort to balance law and grace, gift and demand, freedom and responsibility, a tension felt acutely among those (women and slaves) most constrained by prevailing hierarchies. Gombis refers to Balch’s study, which shows that Philo and Josephus used similar ways to respond when Jews were accused of trying to convert people and cause problems in Roman society. They defended themselves by showing respect for Roman rules and social order.

Talbert, from a socio-historical view, says the oikos was an estate economy, more like a farm/plantation or family firm than a modern nuclear home. The codes worked like an organizational chart to keep the estate running, setting rules for wives/husbands, parents/children, and masters/slaves. On this reading, Eph 5:22–6:9 is not a model for modern marriage but guidance for managing a Christian household-business within the norms of its time. Talbert sees two views in the household codes: first, in the short term, Christians lived under patriarchy and slavery but gave these relationships a Christian touch with less threat and more shared duties. Second, looking long term, the whole Bible story—creation, fall, redemption—points toward equal standing and the end of slavery. He also says Paul’s goal is to build character, not make detailed laws, so the codes give broad examples rather than exact rules.

Parsons argues that the apostles used the household code to soften harsh and hostile relationships, bringing back respect and dignity—especially for women and slaves, within the "new creation" community, based on the idea of being made new in Christ (2 Cor. 5:17). While not originating with Christianity, the form is, in his view, "radically transformed" by Christian authors; he reads the codes as pastoral guidance for those within the churches (e.g., Ephesians, Colossians), expecting correspondingly new behavior from each pair "in Christ."

Felix Just explains that in Roman culture, the pater familias had complete authority over the household. Unlike many secular lists that only gave instructions to wives, children, and slaves, the New Testament household codes also assign duties to the household heads. These codes call for respectful and caring treatment of all members, promoting mutual responsibility within the family. While not fully equal by today’s standards, they demand more mutual respect and obligations than earlier models by treating all household members as responsible moral agents.

Gombis advances a theological reading of Ephesians in which the code is embedded within a larger vision of Spirit-shaped communal life (Ephesians 5:18–21): the code manifests the ethics of a "New Humanity," created "according to God in righteousness and holiness of the truth" (Eph 4:24), oriented by Christ's self-giving love, and thereby confronting and subverting prevailing social structures rather than merely conserving them. Stagg similarly interprets the instructions as channeling life "in Christ" toward stable congregational practice while constraining the coercive authority of household heads (e.g., mutual submission in Ephesians 5:21, sacrificial love in Eph 5:25–33, non-provocation in Eph 6:4, and the ban on threats in Eph 6:9).

==== Linguistic approach ====
In a 2017 study published in the Journal of Greco-Roman Christianity and Judaism, Karl L. Armstrong offers a modern linguistic analysis of the Greek verb ὑποτάσσω ("to submit") within the household code (Haustafel) of Ephesians 5:21-33, arguing that its middle voice construction and its pairing with the reciprocal pronoun ἀλλήλων ("one another") signify a voluntary, mutual submission between spouses rather than a hierarchical, one-sided obligation. Armstrong situates this mutual ethic as an outworking of being Spirit-filled (5:18) and rooted in Christ's sacrificial love, contrasting it with Greco-Roman patriarchal models by highlighting the letter's use of κεφαλή ("head") in a symbiotic, "one-flesh" context from Genesis 2:24. The study concludes that the passage presents a counter-cultural vision where marital roles are redefined through reciprocal respect and love, grounded in reverence for Christ (ἐν φόβῳ Χριστοῦ), representing a radical departure from ancient hierarchical norms toward a framework of mutual dependence and equality.

== See also ==
- Women in Christianity
- Christian views on marriage
- Christian views on the Old Covenant
