= Interdenominational marriage =

Marriage between different religious sects

Interdenominational marriage, sometimes called an inter-sect marriage or ecumenical marriage, is marriage between spouses professing a different denomination of the same religion.

Interdenominational marriages are distinguished from interfaith marriages, unions between two people of different religions.

== Christianity ==
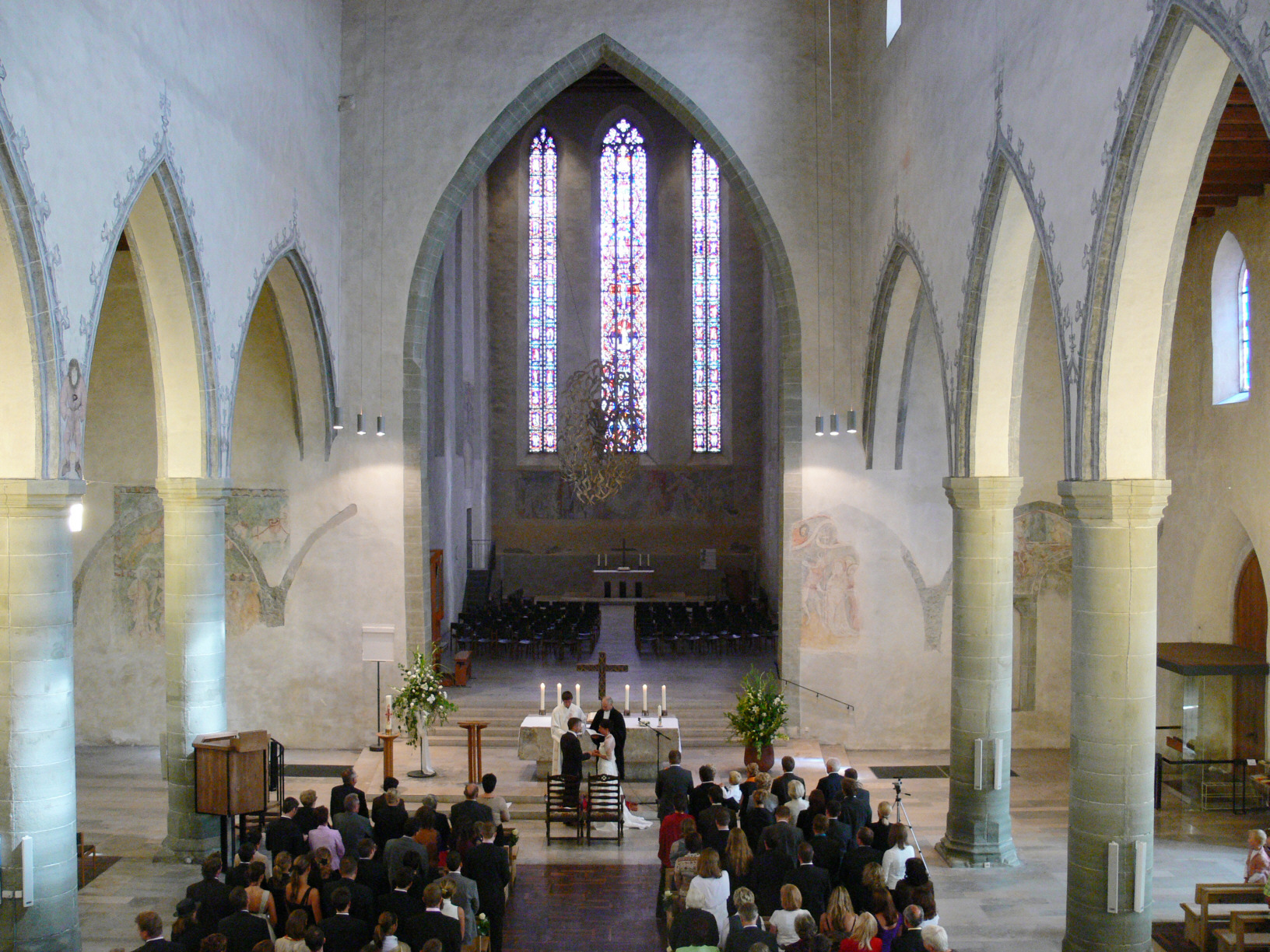
A Lutheran priest in Germany marries a young couple in a church.

In Christianity, an interdenominational marriage (also known as an ecumenical marriage) refers to a wedding between two Christians who belong to different denominations, for example a marriage between a Lutheran and a Catholic.

In Methodism, ¶81 of the 2014 Book of Discipline of the Allegheny Wesleyan Methodist Connection, states with regard to interdenominational marriages: "We do not prohibit our people from marrying persons who are not of our connection, provided such persons have the form and are seeking the power of godliness; but we are determined to discourage their marrying persons who do not come up to this description."

The Catholic Church recognizes as sacramental, (1) the marriages between two baptized Protestants or between two baptized Orthodox Christians, as well as (2) marriages between Catholic faithful and baptized non-Catholics, although in the latter case, consent from the diocesan bishop must be obtained, with this termed "permission to enter into a mixed marriage". To illustrate (1), for example, "if two Lutherans marry in the Lutheran Church in the presence of a Lutheran minister, the Catholic Church recognizes this as a valid sacrament of marriage". Weddings in which both parties are Catholics are ordinarily held in a Catholic church, while weddings in which one party is a Catholic faithful and the other party is a non-Catholic can be held in a Catholic church or a non-Catholic church.

== Islam ==
The largest form of inter-sect marriages in Islam is Sunni-Shia marriage. Such marriages are common in Iraq, but uncommon in Saudi Arabia. The term "sushi marriage" is sometimes used for these marriages, although the term "sushi" is also adopted by Muslims who do not want to identify with either Islamic sect.

== See also ==
- Ecumenism
- Endogamy
- Interfaith marriage
- Multiple religious belonging
- Shia–Sunni relations
