= Raleigh Kirby Godsey =

American educator (born 1936)

Raleigh Kirby Godsey (born April 2, 1936), better known as R. Kirby Godsey, served as the seventeenth president of Mercer University, an independent, coeducational, private university, located in the U.S. state of Georgia, from July 1, 1979 to June 30, 2006 (27 years), longer than any of his predecessors. Godsey is now university chancellor, professor, and special advisor to his successor, William D. Underwood.

== Mercer University ==
Mercer is the only university of its size in the United States that offers programs in eleven diversified fields of study; liberal arts, business, education, music, engineering, medicine, nursing, pharmacy, law, theology, and continuing and professional studies. Mercer has major campuses in Macon, Atlanta, and Savannah; regional academic centers for working adult students in Henry County, Douglas County, and Eastman; teaching hospitals in Macon and Savannah; a university press and a performing arts center in Macon; an engineering research center in Warner Robins; and an NCAA Division I athletic program.

At the time of his retirement as president, Mercer enrolled more than 7,300 students in its eleven colleges and schools, employed more than 1,300 faculty and staff, managed a budget of more than $175 million, and had an endowment of close to $200 million with an additional $200+ million pledged in planned gifts. Godsey, known for his tremendous fundraising abilities, was responsible for much of Mercer's financial success.

Mercer had four colleges and schools when Godsey became president in 1979. During Godsey's tenure, Mercer established seven new colleges and schools; the Eugene W. Stetson School of Business and Economics, the School of Medicine, the School of Engineering, the Tift College of Education, the James and Carolyn McAfee School of Theology, the Townsend School of Music, the Georgia Baptist College of Nursing, and closed the Cecil B. Day College of Arts and Sciences in Atlanta. Mercer also established the Mercer University Press and the Mercer Engineering Research Center (MERC) as well as educational partnerships with Memorial Health University Center in Savannah and the Medical Center of Central Georgia in Macon, Piedmont Healthcare in Atlanta, and Robins Air Force Base in Warner Robins.

In April 2006, near the end of his tenure, Mercer ended its affiliation with the Georgia Baptist Convention. Earlier, in November 2005, the convention voted to break ties with Mercer after a student gay-rights group held a "Coming Out Day" on the university campus. Godsey attempted to maintain the relationship by assuring the convention that Mercer does not advocate homosexuality, but allows discussion on the matter. Godsey had previously alienated the conservative convention by insisting on academic freedom for the university, and by making theological statements in his book When We Talk About God, Let's Be Honest that many Baptists considered heretical. The convention declined Godsey's overtures and voted to sever the 172-year relationship. Mercer remains affiliated with the more liberal Cooperative Baptist Fellowship.

Also in April 2006, Godsey, and current Mercer president William D. Underwood, assisted Jimmy Carter, former President of the United States, organize and host a gathering of Baptist World Alliance leaders at the Carter Center in Atlanta. Godsey and Underwood advocated academic freedom within Baptist higher education and showcased Mercer, now independent from the Georgia Baptist Convention, as the nation's premier independent Baptist university.

== Achievements and honors ==
Prior to being named president, Godsey served as Mercer's executive vice president and was dean of the College of Liberal Arts. Before joining Mercer, he was vice president and dean of Averett College. Before that, Godsey was a Danforth Associate with the Danforth Foundation and served as professor of philosophy and religion at Judson College.

Godsey earned his bachelor's degree in history and religion from Samford University, his master of divinity and doctor of theology degrees from New Orleans Baptist Theological Seminary, his master of arts in philosophy from the University of Alabama, and his doctor of philosophy from Tulane University. He holds honorary doctor of humane letters degrees from the University of South Carolina, Samford University, and Campbell University, and an honorary doctor of laws from Averett College.

Godsey is the author of When We Talk About God, Let's Be Honest; The Courage Factor; Centering Our Souls; and Is God a Christian?, and has written numerous articles for professional journals. He is a frequent lecturer and a consultant on leadership and higher education administration and serves on a number of civic and professional boards and committees. He is a member of the Executive Council of the College Commission for the Southern Association of Colleges and Schools and serves on the Executive Committee of the National Association of Independent Colleges and Universities.

In 1998, 2000, 2002, and 2003, Godsey was named as one of the 100 most influential Georgians by Georgia Trend Magazine. In 2002, he was named the Council for Advancement and Support of Education (CASE) III Chief Executive Officer of the Year. The Macon Chamber of Commerce recognized him in 2003 as the Macon Citizen of the Year. In 2006, he was awarded the Salvation Army "Others" Award, the highest honor bestowed by that organization. Also in 2006, both houses of the Georgia legislature, the Georgia Senate and the Georgia House of Representatives, passed resolutions honoring Godsey for his contributions to higher education, Mercer, and the state.

In April 2006, the Mercer University Board of Trustees voted to name the historic administration building on the Macon campus the R. Kirby Godsey Administration Building.

In May 2006, United States Senator Saxby Chambliss paid tribute to Godsey before the Senate. The tribute appears in the Congressional Record.
