= Penny L. Elkins =

American university president

Penny Elkins

19th President of Mercer University
- Incumbent
- Assumed office January 1, 2026
- Preceded by: William D. Underwood

Personal details
- Education: Mercer University; Georgia College and State University; Georgia State University (PhD)

Penny Elkins is the current president of Mercer University, succeeding William D. Underwood. She was elected as president on November 14, 2025 and took office on January 1, 2026. She is Mercer University's first female president.
