= WMUM =

WMUM may refer to either of two Georgia Public Broadcasting stations licensed to Cochran and serving the Macon area:

- WMUM-TV, a television station broadcasting on channel 9, virtual 29 (formerly WDCO-TV)
- WMUM-FM, a radio station broadcasting on FM 89.7 (formerly WDCO-FM)

Other uses:

- WRMF, an FM station in Palm Beach, Florida, which used the call letters WMUM until 1973
