= Mercer University =

Private university in Macon, Georgia, US

- Former names: Mercer Institute (1833–1837); Southern School of Pharmacy (1903–1959); Atlanta Baptist College (1964–1972)
- Motto: Scientiis, Artibus, Religioni (Latin)
- Motto in English: "Sciences, Arts, and Religion"
- Type: Private research university
- Established: January 14, 1833; 193 years ago
- Accreditation: SACS
- Religious affiliation: No formal affiliation, historically Baptist. Prior to 2006, Georgia Baptist Convention
- Academic affiliations: GRA; NAICU; ORAU; Space-grant
- Endowment: $502 million (2022)
- President: Penny L. Elkins
- Faculty: 737 (fall 2023)
- Students: 9,124 (fall 2023)
- Undergraduates: 4,807 (fall 2023)
- Postgraduates: 4,317 (fall 2023)
- Location: Macon, Georgia, United States; 32°49′45″N 83°38′55″W
- Campus: 150 acres (0.61 km^{2}); Midsize city
- Other campuses: Atlanta; Columbus; Lithia Springs; McDonough; Savannah; Warner Robins
- Newspaper: The Mercer Cluster
- Colors: Black and orange
- Nickname: Bears
- Sporting affiliations: NCAA Division I FCS – SoCon; ASUN; SBC
- Mascots: Toby; Tot
- Website: mercer.edu
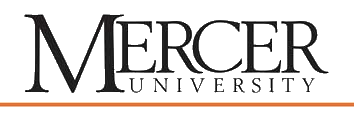

Mercer University is a private research university in Macon, Georgia, United States. Founded in 1833 as Mercer Institute and gaining university status in 1837, it is the oldest private university in the state and enrolls more than 9,000 students in 12 colleges and schools. Mercer is a member of the Georgia Research Alliance. It is classified as "R2: Doctoral Universities — High research activity".

Mercer has four major campuses: the historic (main) campus in Macon, a graduate and professional campus in Atlanta, and four-year campuses of the School of Medicine in Savannah and Columbus. Mercer also has regional academic centers in Henry County and Douglas County; the Mercer University School of Law on its own campus in Macon; teaching hospitals in Macon, Savannah, and Columbus; a university press and a performing arts center, the Grand Opera House, in Macon; and the Mercer Engineering Research Center in Warner Robins. The Mercer University Health Sciences Center encompasses Mercer's medical, pharmacy, nursing, and health professions programs in Macon, Atlanta, Savannah, and Columbus.

Mercer has an NCAA Division I athletic program and fields teams in eight men's and ten women's sports; all university-sponsored sports compete in the Southern Conference except women's sand volleyball, which is not sponsored by the SoCon, and thus competes in the ASUN Conference.

== History ==
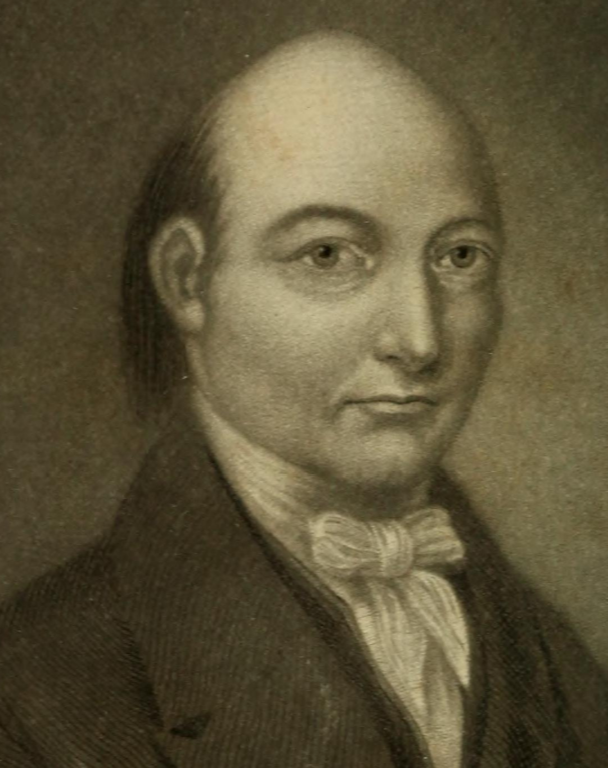
Jesse Mercer, namesake of the university

=== Founding and early years (1833–1959) ===
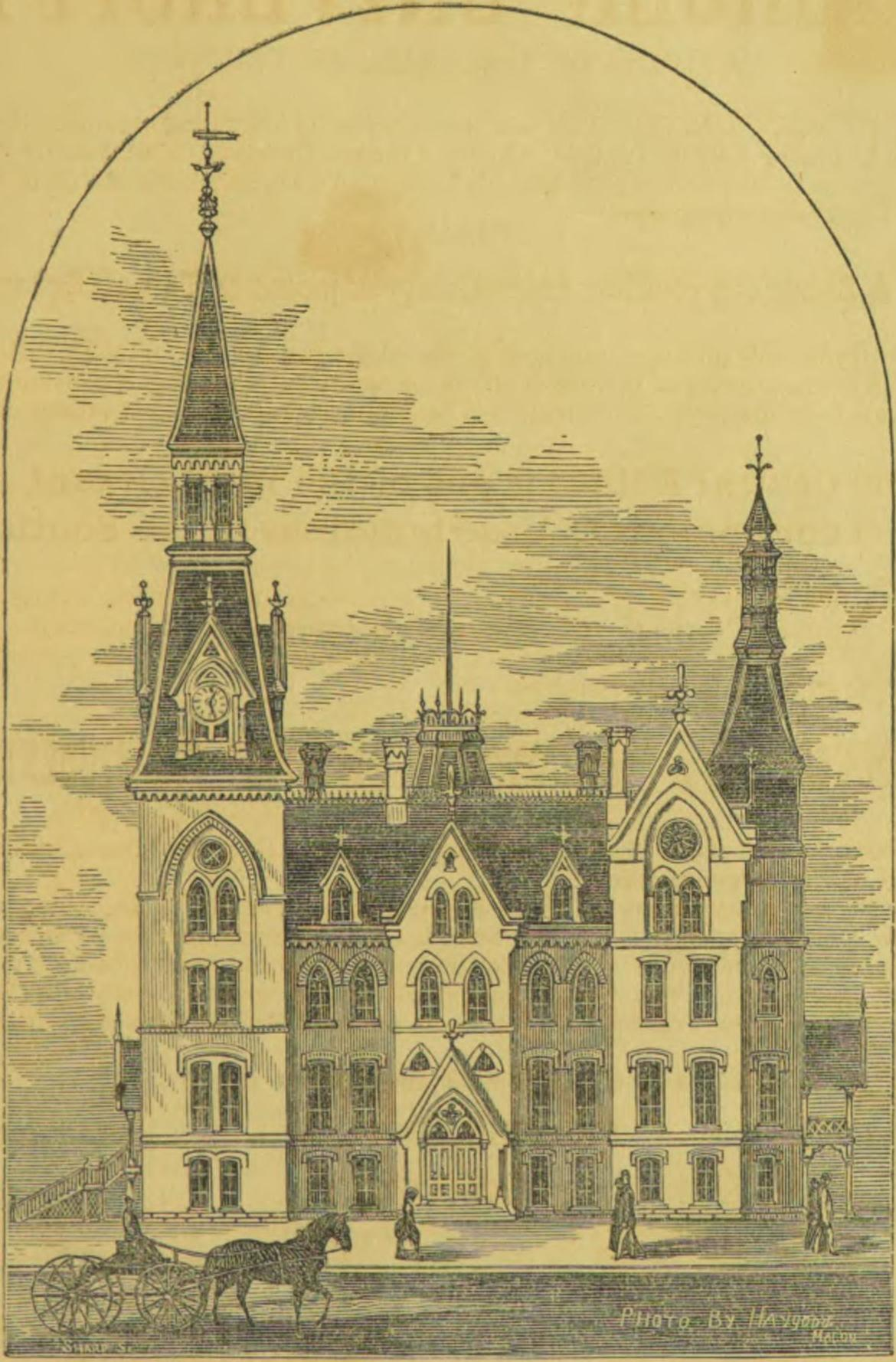
Woodcut of Mercer University from an 1877 Macon, Georgia city directory.

Mercer University was founded in Penfield, Georgia, as a boys' preparatory school under Billington McCarter Sanders, a professor who served as the first president, and Adiel Sherwood, a Baptist minister who previously founded a boys' manual labor school that served as a model. The school opened as Mercer Institute with 39 students on January 14, 1833. The school was named for Jesse Mercer, a prominent Baptist leader who, along with Josiah Penfield, provided a founding endowment and who served as the first chairman of the board of trustees. The Georgia General Assembly granted a university charter in December 1837. Mercer adopted its present name in 1838 and graduated its first university class, of three students, in 1841. In 1871, Mercer moved to Macon, a center of transportation and commerce in Georgia.

The School of Law was established in 1873 and was named the Walter F. George School of Law in 1947 in honor of Mercer alumnus Walter F. George, class of 1901, who served as a United States senator from Georgia and as President pro tempore of the United States Senate.

During World War II, Mercer was one of 131 colleges and universities in the V-12 Navy College Training Program, which offered military training that prepared students for a commission in the United States Navy.

=== Expansion (1959–2013) ===
Mercer expanded to Atlanta in 1959 when the university absorbed the independent Southern School of Pharmacy. The College of Liberal Arts, the School of Law, and the Southern School of Pharmacy comprised the university until 1972 when Mercer merged with Atlanta Baptist College, which became Mercer's Atlanta campus.

Atlanta Baptist College was founded in 1968 under the leadership of Dr. Monroe F. Swilley, a prominent Baptist educator. The college merged with Mercer in 1972 and became the College of Arts and Sciences, and in 1984 was named the Cecil B. Day College of Arts and Sciences. Mercer offered undergraduate liberal arts education in Atlanta until 1990 when the college closed. Faculty and students tried to prevent the closure, but were not successful. The mission of the Atlanta campus changed to graduate and professional education. The Southern School of Pharmacy moved in 1992 from its downtown location to the Cecil B. Day Graduate and Professional Campus.

Between 1982 and 2013, Mercer established nine additional colleges and schools: the School of Medicine in 1982, the Eugene W. Stetson School of Business and Economics in 1984, the School of Engineering in 1985, the James and Carolyn McAfee School of Theology in 1994, the Tift College of Education in 1995, the Georgia Baptist College of Nursing in 2001, the College of Continuing and Professional Studies in 2003 (renamed Penfield College of Mercer University in 2014), the Townsend School of Music in 2006, and the College of Health Professions in 2013. Mercer opened its second four-year medical school in Savannah in 2008 and the multi-campus Mercer University Health Sciences Center in 2012.

Mercer received a $5 million grant from the John S. and James L. Knight Foundation in 2009 to support continued revitalization of the College Hill Corridor between campus and downtown Macon. The Mercer On Mission service-learning program, launched in 2007, has been recognized by the Clinton Global Initiative as "an exemplary approach to addressing a specific global challenge." It helps students combine research, study abroad and service-learning under faculty direction.

The multi-campus Mercer University Health Sciences Center, which incorporates programs offered by the School of Medicine, the College of Pharmacy, the Georgia Baptist College of Nursing, and the new College of Health Professions, opened in 2013. The College of Health Professions, authorized by the board of trustees in 2012, is Mercer's twelfth academic unit. Mercer purchased the former Georgia Music Hall of Fame building in downtown Macon in 2012; the extensively renovated building reopened in 2014 as the home of Mercer Medicine, a multi-specialty physician clinic and a division of the School of Medicine.

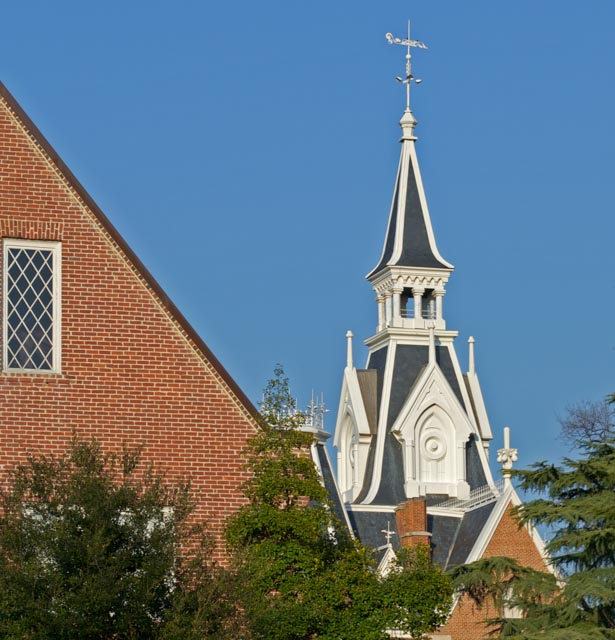
R. Kirby Godsey Administration Building, a university landmark listed on the National Register of Historic Places

Mercer opened a large retail-residential center on the Macon campus in 2011. The center, called Mercer Lofts, houses the Barnes & Noble operated university bookstore, other shops, and student apartments. Mercer Lofts II, a mixed-use development adjacent to Phase I, opened in 2012; the facility houses Mercer's Center for Collaborative Journalism, which consists of the university's journalism department and the editorial-professional staffs of the Macon Telegraph and Georgia Public Broadcasting (on the first floor) along with student apartments (on upper floors). Also in 2012, the university opened a new admissions and welcome center on the Macon campus; the center is named for Emily Parker Myers, a long-time university administrator, and is the university's first LEED certified building. In 2013, Mercer completed Cruz Plaza, a major landscaping project for the Macon campus central quadrangle linking the University Center (Hawkins Arena), Tarver Library, and Connell Student Center.

==== Desegregation ====
Mercer University was the first college or university in Georgia to fully desegregate. On April 18, 1963, the board of trustees voted 13 to 5, with 3 abstentions, to ratify the policy that "Mercer University considers all applications based on qualification, without consideration of race, color of skin, creed, or origin." This policy change allowed Sam Oni, a twenty-two-year-old student from Ghana, to become the first Black student to attend Mercer University. Sam Oni, knowingly and intentionally, in part applied to Mercer for the purpose of helping to end racial segregation in the United States. As Sam Oni phrased it, "My role, as we conceived it was by breaking the color bar at Mercer, I would be challenging our Southern Baptist brothers and sisters in America to confront gross contradictions in the Christian witness at home and abroad." Sam Oni succeeded despite pressure from segregationists in both the South and the Southern Baptist Convention to keep Mercer racially segregated, including an airplane flying a banner that read "Keep Mercer Segregated" as the Board of Trustees successfully voted to fully integrate.

==== Religious affiliation ====
In 2006, the Georgia Baptist Convention (Southern Baptist Convention) ended its affiliation with Mercer, after 173 years. Before the affiliation ended, Mercer had an independent board of trustees; the convention provided financial support but did not control the university. The lack of control caused friction, with Mercer resisting restraints on social issues while the Convention saw Mercer as becoming secularized and not conforming to its values. The Convention reportedly complained about the presence of a "pro-gay student group" at Mercer, and the university's "support for non-Southern Baptist organizations."

Mercer is currently affiliated with the Cooperative Baptist Fellowship, a more liberal group of Baptists. The denomination's official records are stored at Mercer University, and the university is partnered with the denomination.

=== 2014–present ===
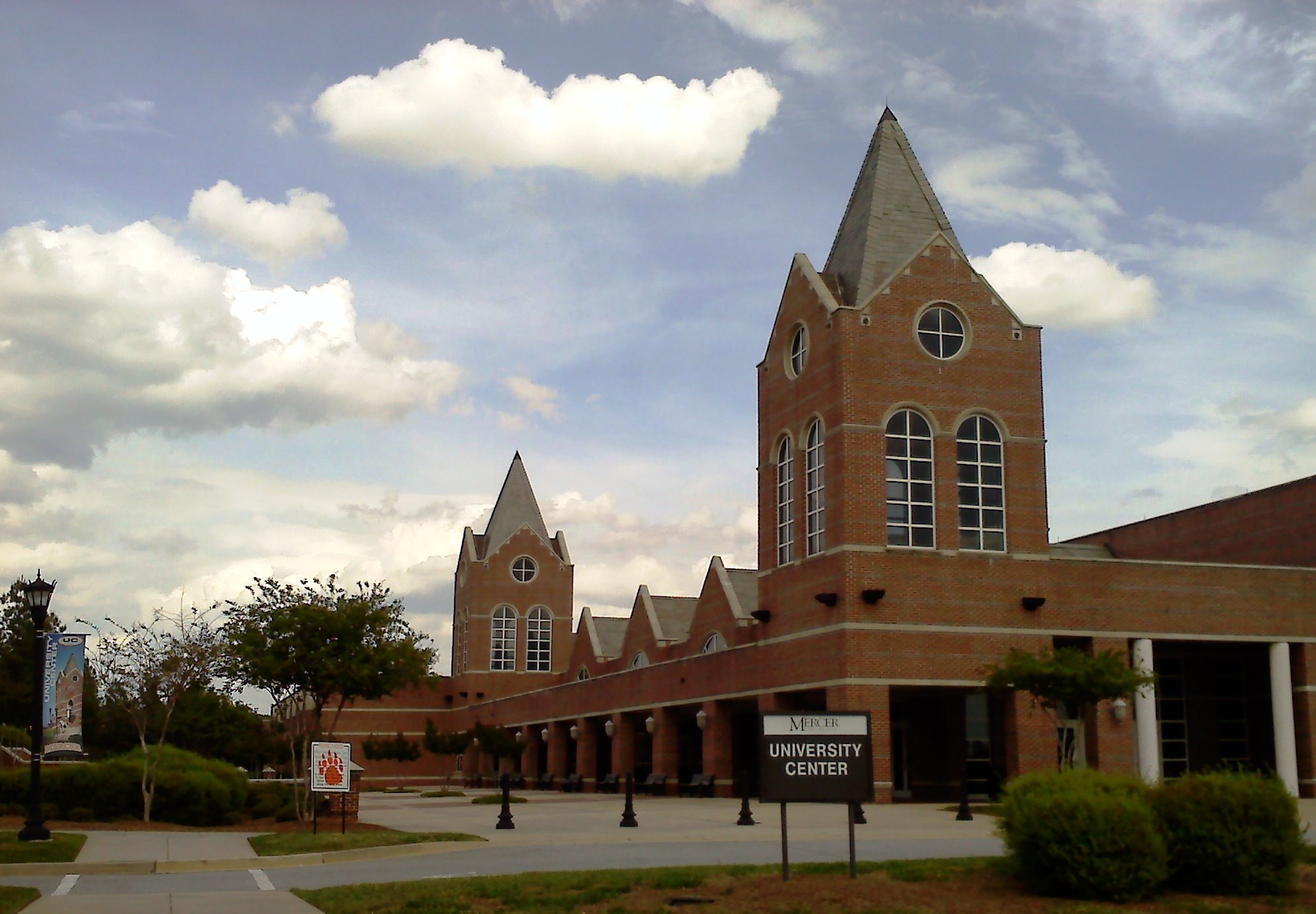
University Center (Hawkins Arena)

On October 31, 2014, Mercer announced an effort to raise $400 million, including $207 million for its endowment, $109 million for capital projects, and $84 million for operations. By its public launch, $90 million in gifts and pledges had been collected. The campaign aims to fund a $15 million medical education facility in Savannah, ground was broken on October 14, 2014; a $25 million undergraduate sciences facility in Macon; a $20 million health sciences building in Atlanta; a $3 million baseball stadium in Macon; additional endowment for faculty positions, academic programs and student scholarships; funding for programs and initiatives such as Mercer On Mission; and additional support throughout the university's 12 schools and colleges, Mercer University Press, the university libraries, athletic department, and other administrative units.

In athletics, Mercer has added programs in men's lacrosse, sand volleyball, and football; constructed a new football and lacrosse complex, named Five Star Stadium (10,200 seats); and changed affiliation to the Southern Conference. In 2014, Mercer set an enrollment record in the fall of 2014 with a university-wide population of 8,557 students. The larger student body reflects expanded academic programs including five new doctoral degrees: Doctor of Philosophy in Curriculum and Instruction, Doctor of Philosophy in Nursing, Doctor of Nursing Practice, Doctor of Physical Therapy, and Doctor of Philosophy in Clinical Medical Psychology. Mercer opened its second four-year medical school, in Savannah, in 2008.

Mercer opened Mercer Lofts III in 2014; the facility is a large student-housing complex on College Street next to Tattnall Square Park and the university's historic north quadrangle. Also in 2014, Mercer completed an extensive renovation of the historic Amanda Bell House, listed on the National Register of Historic Places; the building houses the Robert McDuffie Center for Strings of the Townsend School of Music and is one of the finest conservatory facilities in the nation. Mercer's television station, WMUB (Mercer University Broadcasting), opened a new studio in Mercer Village in 2014 as a part of the university's Center for Collaborative Journalism.

The M. Diane Owens Garden, named for the first female chair of Mercer's board of trustees, a large environmentally friendly fountain and garden area near Five Star Stadium, was dedicated in 2014. The garden complements Cruz Plaza, completed in 2013, as a major landscaping project beautifying the Macon campus.

Mercer Lofts IV, known as the Lofts at College Hill, opened in 2015; the housing-retail complex is designed for graduate and professional students and is located adjacent to Macon's main post office between College Street and Interstate 75, near the Walter F. George School of Law. Mercer's Tattnall Square Center for the Arts also opened in 2015; the center is the former Tattnall Square Presbyterian Church, near the historic north quadrangle, and now houses the university theater department and is a community performing arts center.

Mercer Lofts V, known as the Lofts at Mercer Landing, opened in 2016 adjacent to Five Star Stadium near the Mercer University Drive exit from Interstate 75; a new campus entrance and a pedestrian bridge connecting the campus and the complex are also complete. The facility provides student housing, university offices, and a large parking garage; retail-food facilities and a second on-campus hotel, operated by Marriott TownePlace Suites, are a part of the complex as well, located directly across Mercer University Drive from the university's Hilton Garden Inn.

Mercer's other construction projects in recent years include renovation and expansion of the School of Medicine facility in Savannah (completed 2016), a new undergraduate residence hall in Macon named Legacy Hall (completed 2016), and a renovated and enlarged baseball facility named OrthoGeorgia Park at Claude Smith Field (completed 2017).

Mercer's Board of Trustees on April 20, 2018, approved a new strategic plan that succeeds the 2008 plan, which saw the institution reclassified as a national research university, admitted to the Georgia Research Alliance, granted a Phi Beta Kappa chapter, growth of 41 percent in undergraduate enrollment, a near doubling of research expenditures, investment of more than $200 million in new facilities, and an increase of endowment to more than $300 million. The 2018 strategic plan, titled Inspire: Mercer's Vision for the Decade Ahead, has seven imperatives: be an intimate and diverse community of gifted scholars committed to changing the world; be a place of discovery and innovation; be a global university; be relevant; achieve meaningful outcomes; compete with the best, and be true to its heritage.

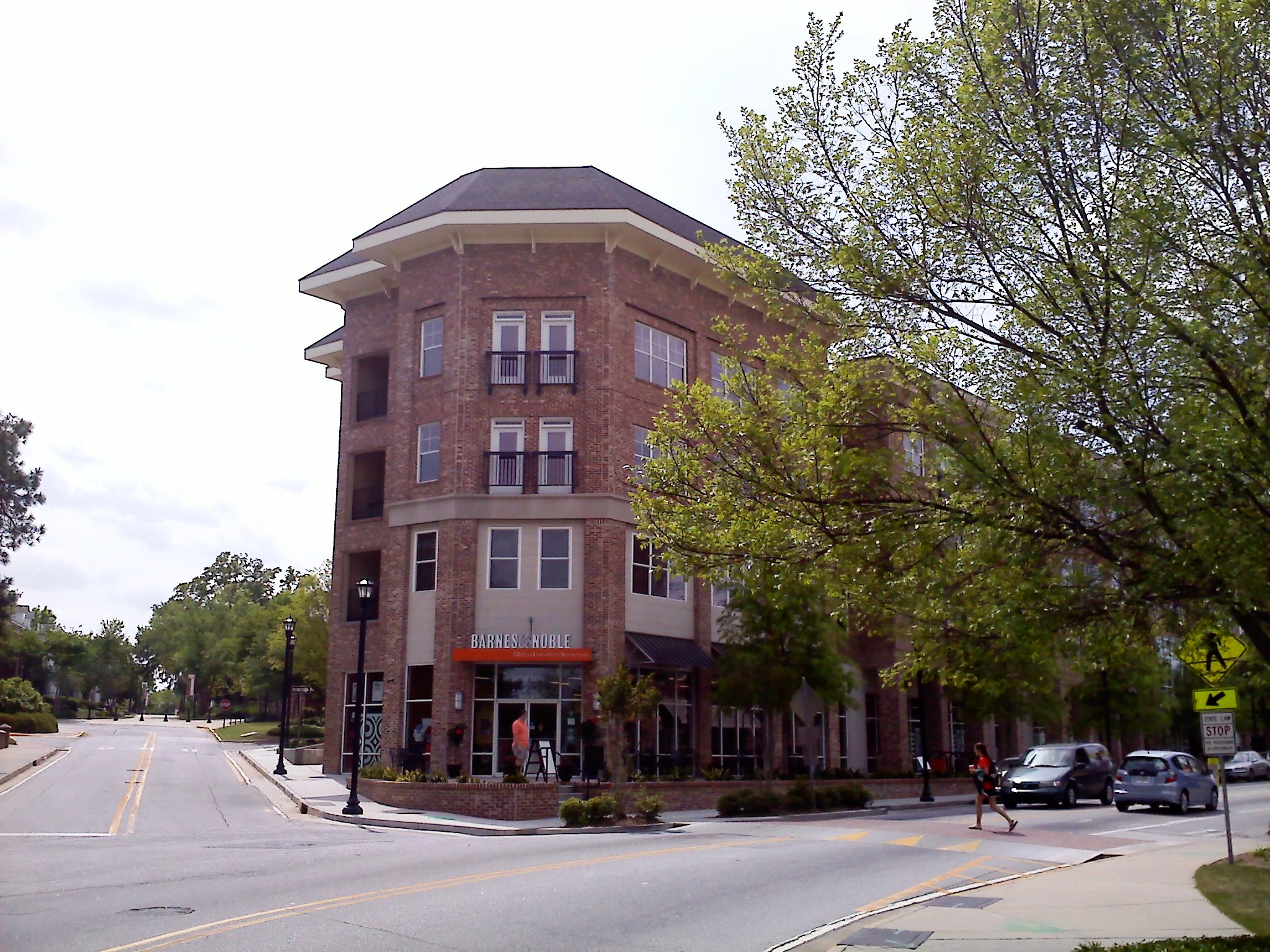
Mercer Village, location of the university bookstore, other shops, student apartments, and the Center for Collaborative Journalism (newspaper, radio, television)

Mercer has launched second and third medical school campuses (in Savannah and Columbus), started a master's-level physician assistant program and a doctoral-level program in physical therapy, and added doctoral programs in clinical psychology, nursing, counseling, educational leadership, and curriculum and instruction. Reflecting an increased emphasis on research, Mercer meets criteria established by the Carnegie Foundation for classification as a research-doctoral university; the number of doctoral students has increased from fewer than 35 to more than 250. In addition, annual externally funded research expenditures now exceed $36 million due to increased funding from the National Institutes of Health, the National Science Foundation, and the Georgia Research Alliance; plus new funding as eminent cancer scientists by the Georgia Cancer Coalition.

Mercer students have earned national recognition and prestigious Fulbright, Goldwater, Teach For America and Peace Corps scholarships and appointments; as of 2012, two of the last three recipients of the Gulf South Summit Award for Outstanding Student Contributions to Service-Learning have been Mercer students and Mercer ranks among the top three institutions in the Southeast for placement of Peace Corps volunteers among colleges and universities with fewer than 5,000 undergraduate students.

The university dedicated in April 2018 the new $44 million Godsey Science Center. The largest academic facility project in the university's history, the science center includes 60 teaching and research labs, three medium classrooms (75 to 100 students each), four small classrooms (32 students each) and 46 offices for Mercer's biology, chemistry, biochemistry, and neuroscience programs.

Mercer began construction on Phase II of the Mercer Landing development in early 2018. The project, located adjacent to the residential loft complex completed in 2016, will provide more student housing and more parking for the complex and for Five Star Stadium, which is located across Mercer University Drive.

=== Presidents ===
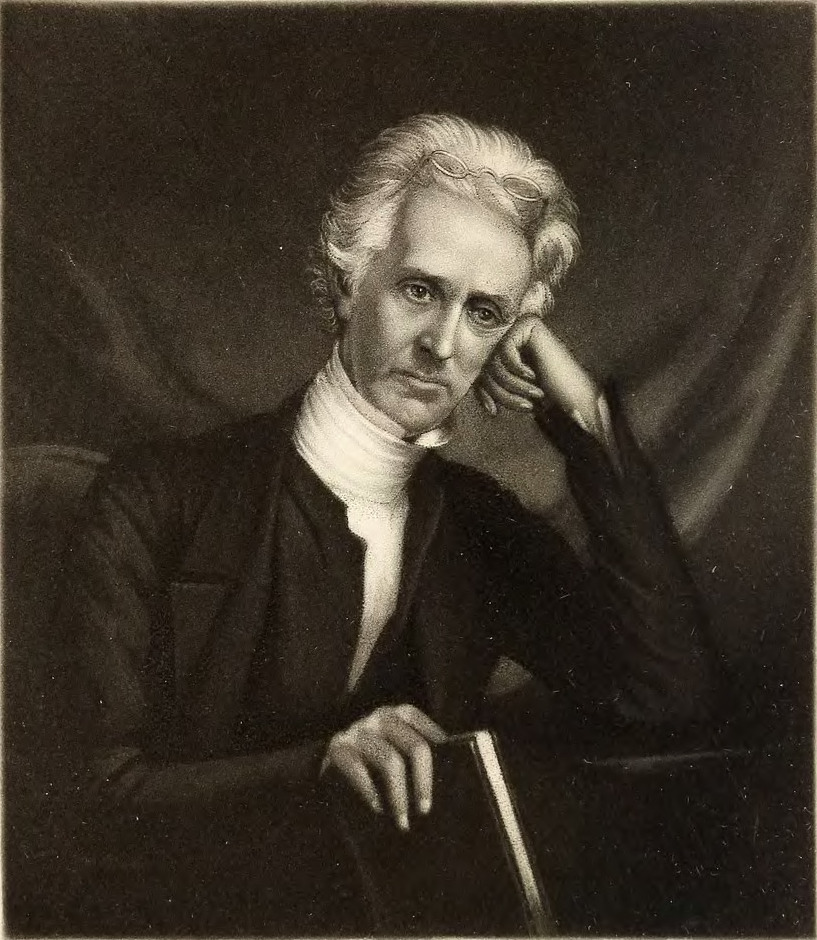
Rev. Billington M. Sanders, Mercer's first president

- Billington McCarter Sanders (1833–1840)
- Otis Smith (1840–1844)
- John Leadley Dagg (1844–1854)
- Nathaniel Macon Crawford (1854–1856)
- Shelton Palmer Sanford (acting President; 1856–1858)
- Nathaniel Macon Crawford (1858–1866)
- Henry Holcombe Tucker (1866–1871)
- Archibald John Battle (1872–1889)
- Gustavus Alonzo Nunnally (1889–1893)
- Joseph Edgerton Willet (acting President; 1893)
- James Bruton Gambrell (1893–1896)
- Pinckney Daniel Pollock (1896–1903)
- William Heard Kilpatrick (acting President; 1903–1905)
- Charles Lee Smith (1905–1906)
- Samuel Young Jameson (1906–1913)
- James Freeman Sellers (acting President; 1913–1914)
- William Lowndes Pickard (1914–1918)
- Rufus Washington Weaver (1918–1927)
- Andrew Phillip Montague (acting President; 1927–1928)
- Spright Dowell (1928–1953)
- George Boyce Connell (1953–1959)
- Spright Dowell (interim President; 1959–1960)
- Rufus Carrollton Harris (1960–1979)
- Raleigh Kirby Godsey (1979–2006)
- William D. Underwood (2006–2026)
- Penny L. Elkins (2026-)

== Campuses ==
=== Macon campus ===
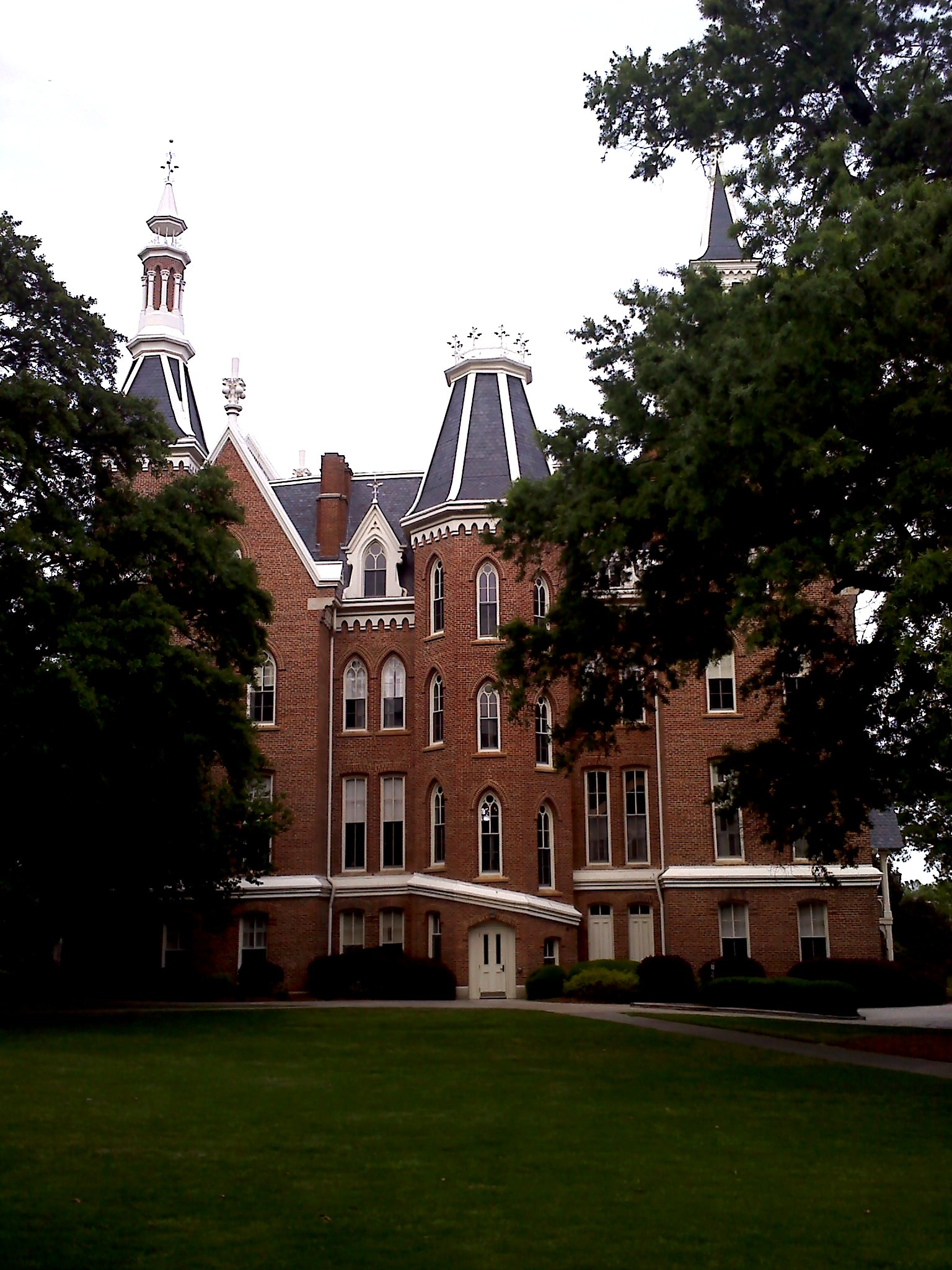
R. Kirby Godsey Administration Building, on the historic quad north, heart of the Macon campus

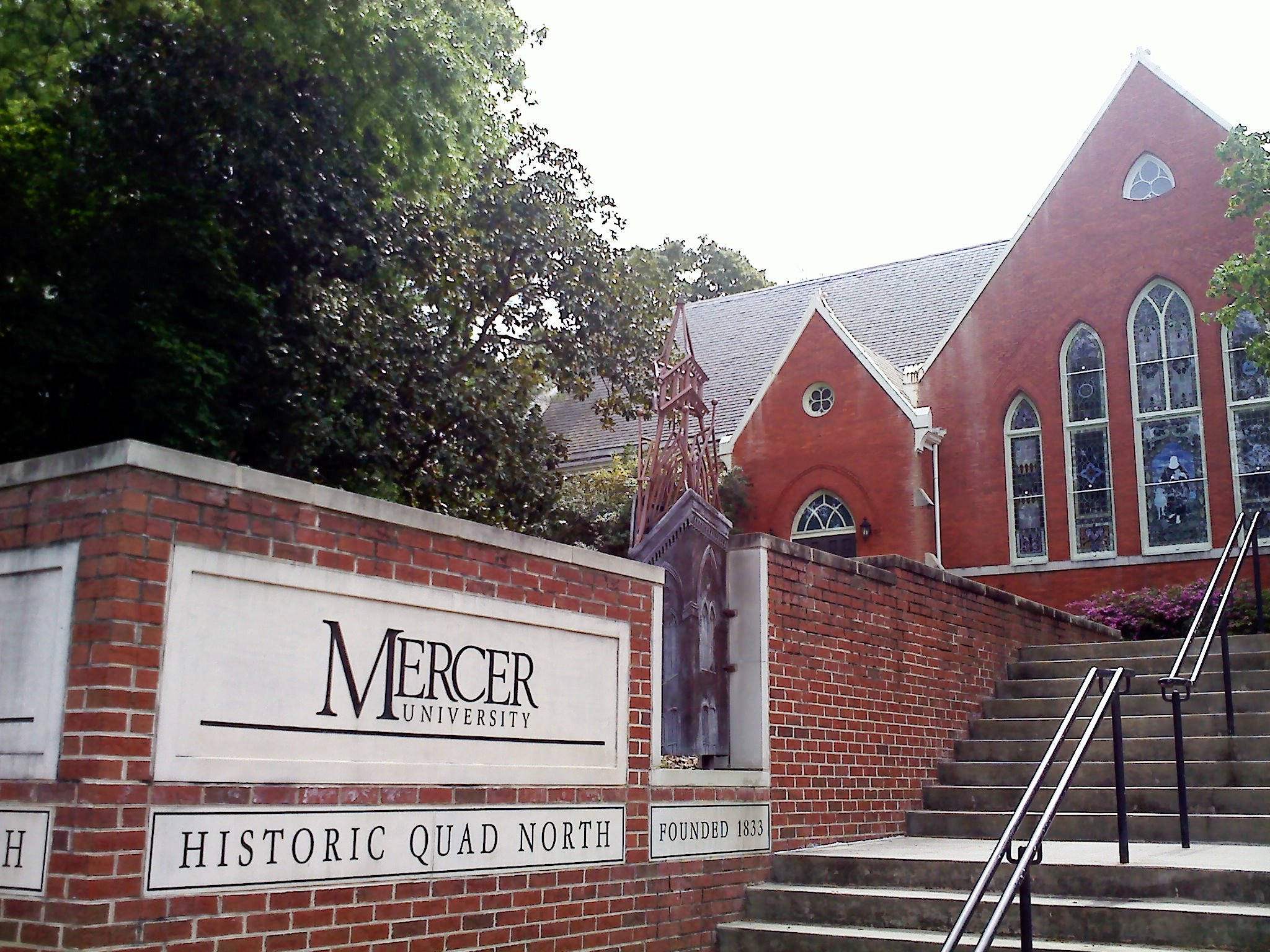
Louie De Votie Newton Chapel, on the historic quad north

The main campus of Mercer University is in Macon, approximately 75 miles (121 km) south of Atlanta. The College of Liberal Arts and Sciences, the Stetson-Hatcher School of Business, the Tift College of Education, the Townsend School of Music, the School of Engineering, the School of Medicine, and programs of the College of Professional Advancement are located on the Macon campus. The R. Kirby Godsey Administration Building, the W. G. Lee Alumni House, and the Emily Parker Myers Admissions and Welcome Center (listed as R. J. Anderson House) are listed on the National Register of Historic Places. Also listed are the Amanda Bell House (listed as Lassiter House), which houses the Robert McDuffie Center for Strings of the Townsend School of Music, located on College Street one mile (1.6 km) from the main campus, and the Grand Opera House, a county-owned performing arts center operated by Mercer.

The Macon campus is home to the Office of International Programs, which offers exchange partnerships between Macon and universities in countries such as England, Scotland, Germany, Spain, France, Sweden, Morocco, Argentina, Japan, Hong Kong, and South Korea.

=== Law school campus (Macon) ===
The Mercer University School of Law is located on its own campus in Macon, one mile (1.6 km) from the main campus. The Law School building is a three-story partial replica of Independence Hall in Philadelphia and is located on Coleman Hill overlooking downtown Macon. Adjacent to the Law School is the university-owned Woodruff House, a Greek revival-style mansion built in 1836 and listed on the National Register of Historic Places, which is used for university special events. The Law School building and the Woodruff House are two of Macon's most recognizable sites.

=== Atlanta campus ===
The Cecil B. Day Graduate and Professional Campus of Mercer University is in the Atlanta metropolitan area, approximately two miles (3.2 km) south of the interchange of Interstate 85 and Interstate 285 in the Northlake area of DeKalb County. The College of Professional Advancement, the James and Carolyn McAfee School of Theology, the College of Pharmacy, the Georgia Baptist College of Nursing, and programs of the Stetson-Hatcher School of Business (BBA, MBA and Executive MBA programs), the Tift College of Education (Master's and PhD programs), and the School of Medicine (Master's program) are located here. Mercer's Atlanta campus was formerly the home of Atlanta Baptist College until it merged with Mercer in 1972. The campus is named for Cecil B. Day, founder of Days Inn Hotels who attended Mercer before leaving to serve in the United States Marine Corps.

Mercer enlarged the Atlanta campus in 2004 by acquiring the former headquarters of the Georgia Baptist Convention, which constructed a new headquarters in Gwinnett County. The former headquarters building, renamed the Mercer University Conference and Administration Center, is occupied by the American Baptist Historical Society and the Baptist History and Heritage Society.

The current 151,066-square-foot (14,034.5 m^{2}) headquarters of the Federal Bureau of Investigation Atlanta Field Office is on the grounds of Mercer Atlanta Campus and opened in 2017.

=== Savannah campus ===
Mercer opened a new four-year medical school in Savannah in August 2008. The campus is a branch of the School of Medicine in Macon and is located at Memorial University Medical Center, Mercer's teaching hospital in Savannah. The new medical school campus is the university's third major campus in addition to those in Macon and Atlanta.

The School of Medicine's new medical education and research facility at Memorial was dedicated in April 2016. The $18 million Savannah campus expansion, which began in October 2014 and was completed in December 2015, includes renovation of approximately 26,500 square feet of classrooms, offices, research labs and library space in the Hoskins Center, as well as construction of 30,000 square feet of new space for additional classrooms, exam rooms and study areas. This expansion allows for a 50-percent increase in M.D. student enrollment – from 160 to 240 students – in Savannah, equaling the number of M.D. students on the Macon campus.

=== Columbus campus ===
In February 2012, Mercer announced the establishment of a new campus in Columbus. The campus was the third for the School of Medicine, which has existing campuses in Macon and Savannah. The campus partnered with two regional hospitals, The Medical Center and St. Francis Hospital, and beginning in the summer of 2012, offered clinical rotations for third and fourth year students. On September 3, 2020, the university broke ground for a new School of Medicine campus in Columbus to accommodate the expansion to a full four-year M.D. program. The initial cohort of first-year M.D. students began classes in August 2021 and the new campus was completed in December 2021.

=== Teaching hospitals ===
Mercer is affiliated with five teaching hospitals – Memorial University Medical Center in Savannah; Atrium Health Navicent The Medical Center; Piedmont Medical Center in Macon; Piedmont Columbus Regional Hospital; and St. Francis Hospital in Columbus.

=== Regional academic centers ===
Mercer has regional academic centers in Henry County and Douglas County. The centers offer undergraduate and graduate degrees for working adults.

The Henry County Regional Academic Center opened in 2003. The facility combined programs previously offered at two smaller facilities in Covington and Griffin. The center is located in McDonough.

The Douglas County Regional Academic Center was named in 2007 in honor of Fred and Aileen Borrish, longtime Mercer benefactors and supporters of education in Douglas County. The center is located in Lithia Springs.

=== Mercer libraries ===
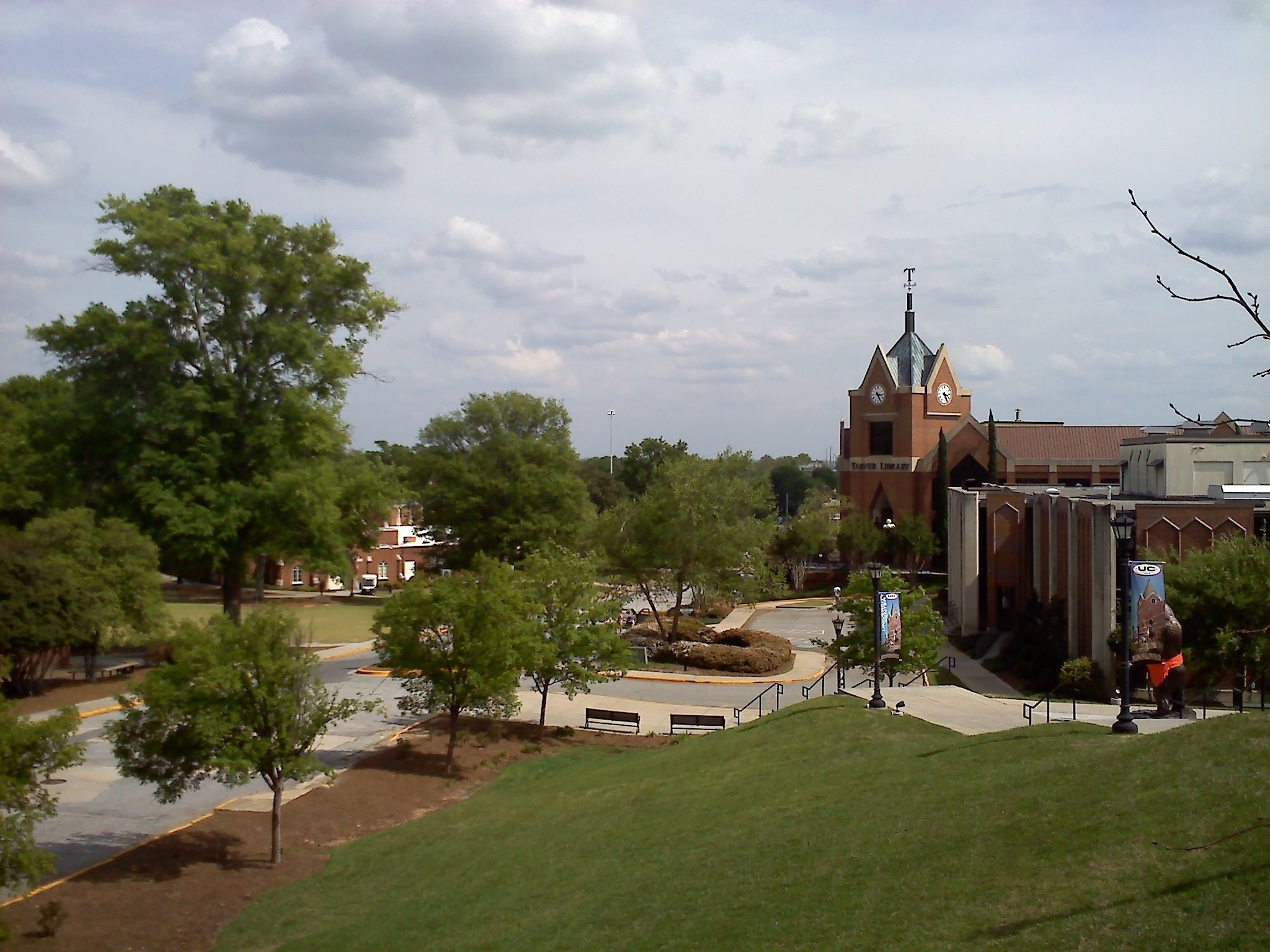
Mercer's Central Quad, location of the Jack Tarver Library (with the clock tower) and Stetson Hall (on the right); Stetson Hall houses the Stetson-Hatcher School of Business and the Tift College of Education

Mercer University has four libraries, which are organized as a separate division alongside the twelve colleges and schools. The Monroe F. Swilley, Jr. Library on the Atlanta campus serves as the library for the graduate and professional schools and colleges. The Douglas County Academic Center Library is located in Lithia Springs. The Jack Tarver Library is located on the Macon campus and serves as a Federal Depository Library. The Henry County Academic Center Library is located in McDonough.

The Peyton T. Anderson Resources Center of the Skelton Medical Libraries is located on the Macon campus inside the Medical School Building. The Furman Smith Law Library, located in the Walter F. George School of Law, are also in Macon. Each library has a wide variety of print and non-print resources. The University Libraries also houses the department of Archives, Special Collections, and Digital Initiatives.

== Academics ==
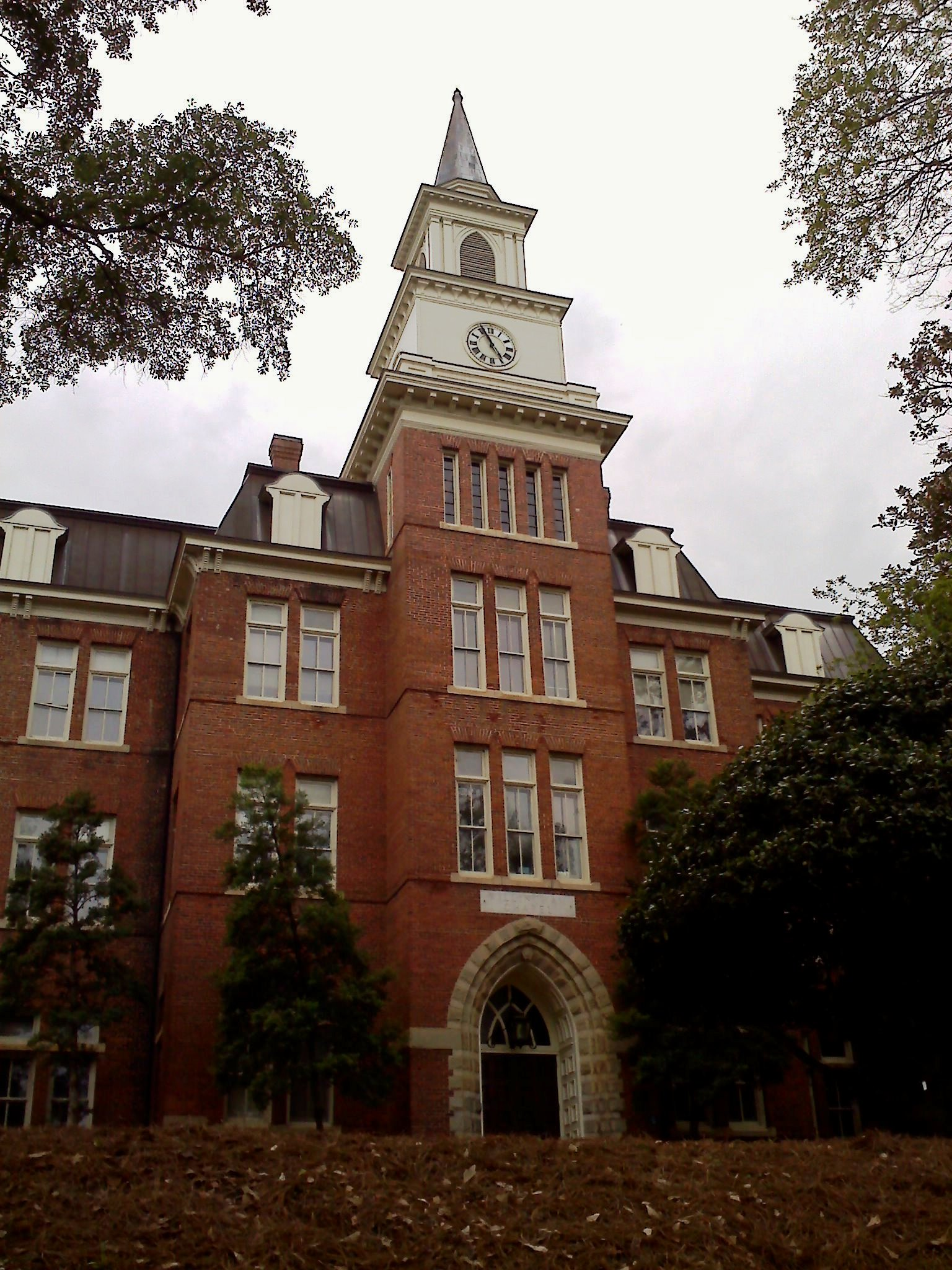
Willingham Hall, an academic building on the historic quad north

=== College of Liberal Arts and Sciences ===
The College of Liberal Arts and Sciences, founded in 1833, is the heart of the university offering undergraduate degrees in the arts, humanities, communications, natural sciences, and social sciences. The college, with more than 110 full-time faculty members, offers dozens of majors, minors, and interdisciplinary programs, and the Great Books program allows students to study the classic writers and thinkers of the Western world. In 2011, the college's largest majors were biology and biochemistry, psychology, chemistry, English, and political science. The curricular program of the college is recognized for its focus on critical thinking, effective communication, problem-solving, and development of the whole person. In 2015, Mercer University was chartered to shelter a chapter of Phi Beta Kappa, America's oldest and most distinguished honor society devoted to the pursuit of liberal education and intellectual fellowship.

=== Stetson-Hatcher School of Business ===
The Stetson-Hatcher School of Business, founded in 1984, has the highest level of accreditation for business schools from the Association to Advance Collegiate Schools of Business. The school offers bachelor's degree (BBA) programs in Macon, Atlanta, and Douglas County, Evening MBA programs in Macon and Atlanta, Professional MBA programs in Henry County and Savannah, and an Executive MBA program in Atlanta.

The Mercer University Executive Forum, Georgia's premier business outreach program, is a part of the school. The program welcomes nationally known speakers who conduct management and leadership seminars in Macon and Atlanta. Speakers have included Lou Dobbs, Bob Dole, Steve Forbes, Lou Holtz, Jesse Jackson, Tom Ridge, George Tenet, George Will, Bob Woodward, and numerous other business, political, and social leaders.

=== School of Engineering ===
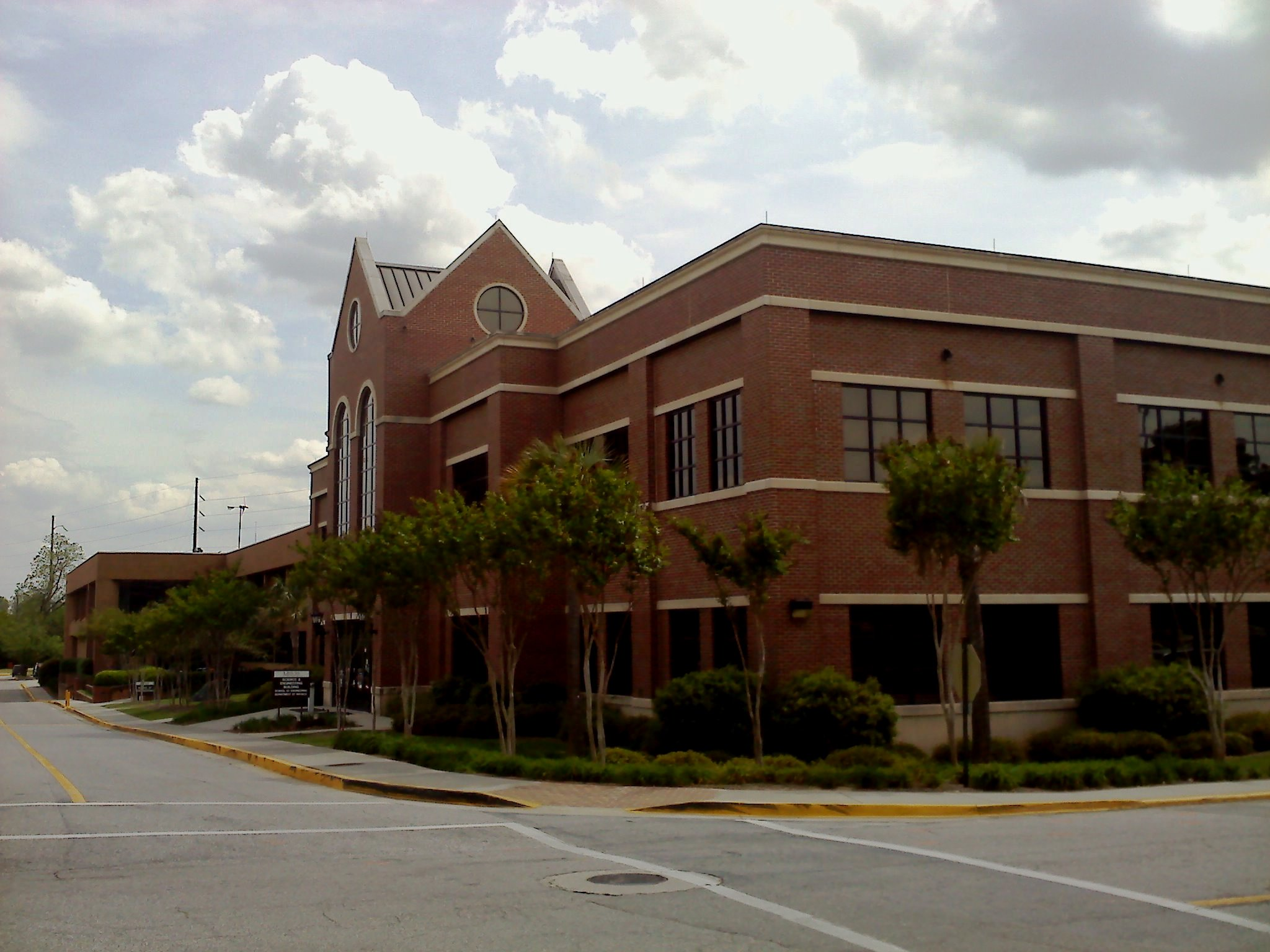
Science and Engineering Building

The School of Engineering, founded in 1985, is the only private engineering school in Georgia and one of only five engineering schools in the state; the others are Georgia Institute of Technology, Georgia Southern University, University of Georgia, and Kennesaw State University. The school offers undergraduate and graduate degrees and is the primary provider of engineers for Robins Air Force Base in Warner Robins, Georgia. The school is located on the Macon campus in a modern 62,000-square-foot (5,800 m^{2}) academic facility. Mercer dedicated a new $14 million Science and Engineering Building adjacent to the existing facility in 2007; the new building significantly expands the school's laboratory and classroom resources. Mercer Engineering Research Center (MERC), an extension of the school located in a state-of-the-art facility in Warner Robins, directly supports Robins AFB and offers significant research opportunities for students and faculty. In addition, the school's National Engineering Advisory Board, composed of some of the nation's most respected corporate leaders including Northrop Grumman, Lockheed Martin, Raytheon, Boeing, and Georgia Pacific, provides premier research and career opportunities for students.

The School of Engineering and Robins Air Force Base maintain an educational partnership that provides on-base internships and other learning opportunities for aerospace engineering, electrical engineering, and computer engineering students. The partnership is separate from the Mercer Engineering and Research Center, which is located near the base in Warner Robins. The educational partnership is one of two maintained by Mercer University, the other involves the Georgia Baptist College of Nursing, the School of Medicine, and Piedmont Healthcare of Atlanta.

The Clinton Global Initiative University, a program of the William J. Clinton Foundation, recognized Mercer University in 2009 for its Mercer On Mission project, which provides amputees in developing nations with low-cost prosthetics. The prosthetics use a universal socket technology developed by School of Engineering faculty and students. Mercer On Mission was one of only three university projects recognized by former President Bill Clinton at the CGI University annual conference.

=== Tift College of Education ===
The Tift College of Education, founded in 1995 as the School of Education, has the highest level of accreditation from the National Council for Accreditation of Teacher Education and is the largest private provider of teachers in Georgia. The college was named in 2001 to honor the legacy of Tift College, a Baptist women's college in Forsyth. Tift College, founded in 1849, merged with Mercer in 1986 and was closed. Mercer adopted its alumnae and maintains their records.

The Tift College of Education offers undergraduate, graduate, and professional programs on the Macon and Atlanta campuses and at the university's regional academic centers. The college offers three Doctor of Philosophy degrees: P–12 School Leadership, Higher Education Leadership, and Curriculum and Instruction.

=== Townsend School of Music ===
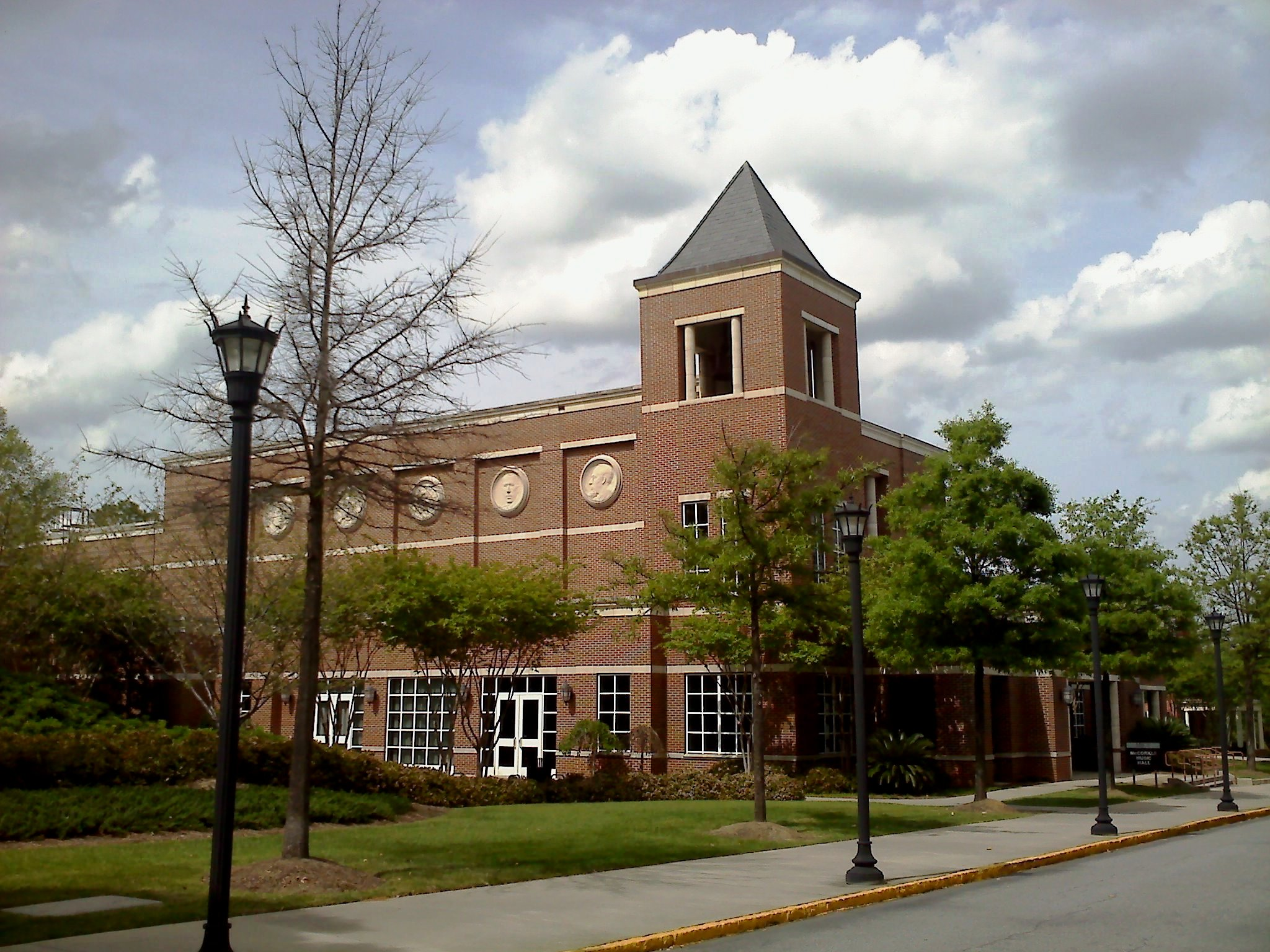
Townsend School of Music is housed in the Allan and Rosemary McCorkle Music Building

The Townsend School of Music opened on July 1, 2006. Mercer trustee Carolyn McAfee, wife of James T. McAfee, Jr., former chairman of Mercer's board of trustees, and her son and daughter-in-law, Tom McAfee and his wife Julie, provided the founding endowment. The school, named in honor of Mrs. McAfee's parents, Raymond and Sophia Townsend, is housed in the Allan and Rosemary McCorkle Music Building, a state-of-the-art facility that opened in 2001 on the Macon campus. The Townsend School of Music offers undergraduate and graduate music degrees formerly offered by the College of Liberal Arts.

The Townsend-McAfee Institute, established in 2005, is a collaboration between the Townsend School of Music and the James and Carolyn McAfee School of Theology offering graduate programs in church music that prepare musical artists for the ministry. The institute, located on the Macon campus with the School of Music, is the parent company of Celebrating Grace, which publishes the eponymous hymnal for the Cooperative Baptist Fellowship, from Mercer University Press. Released in 2010, the project demonstrates Mercer's commitment to its church-related heritage and connects with the university's namesake, Jesse Mercer, who authored Cluster of Spiritual Songs, a hymnal first published circa 1800 with 11 subsequent editions. In 2023, the Townsend-McAfee Institute expanded Celebrating Grace by acquiring the dormant choral and printed music divisions of the John T. Benson Music Company from Universal Music Group, which had shuttered it in December 2021, and restarted the division. In December 2024, the Townsend-McAfee Institute acquired Smith and Helwys, a publisher of Cooperative Baptist Fellowship-affiliated Bible study material. The acquisitions have made the Townsend-McAfee Institute, and Mercer University itself, a leading publisher of choral music and church Bible study material, which is used by both CBF and non-CBF churches alike.

The Robert McDuffie Center for Strings offers music training. McDuffie is a violinist who has served as Distinguished University Professor of Music since 2004. The focus of the center, housed in the School of Music on the Macon campus, is to provide string students the opportunity to learn with string musicians. Total enrollment is limited to 26 students: 12 violinists, 6 violists, 6 cellists and 2 double bassists.

=== College of Professional Advancement (Continuing and Professional Studies) ===
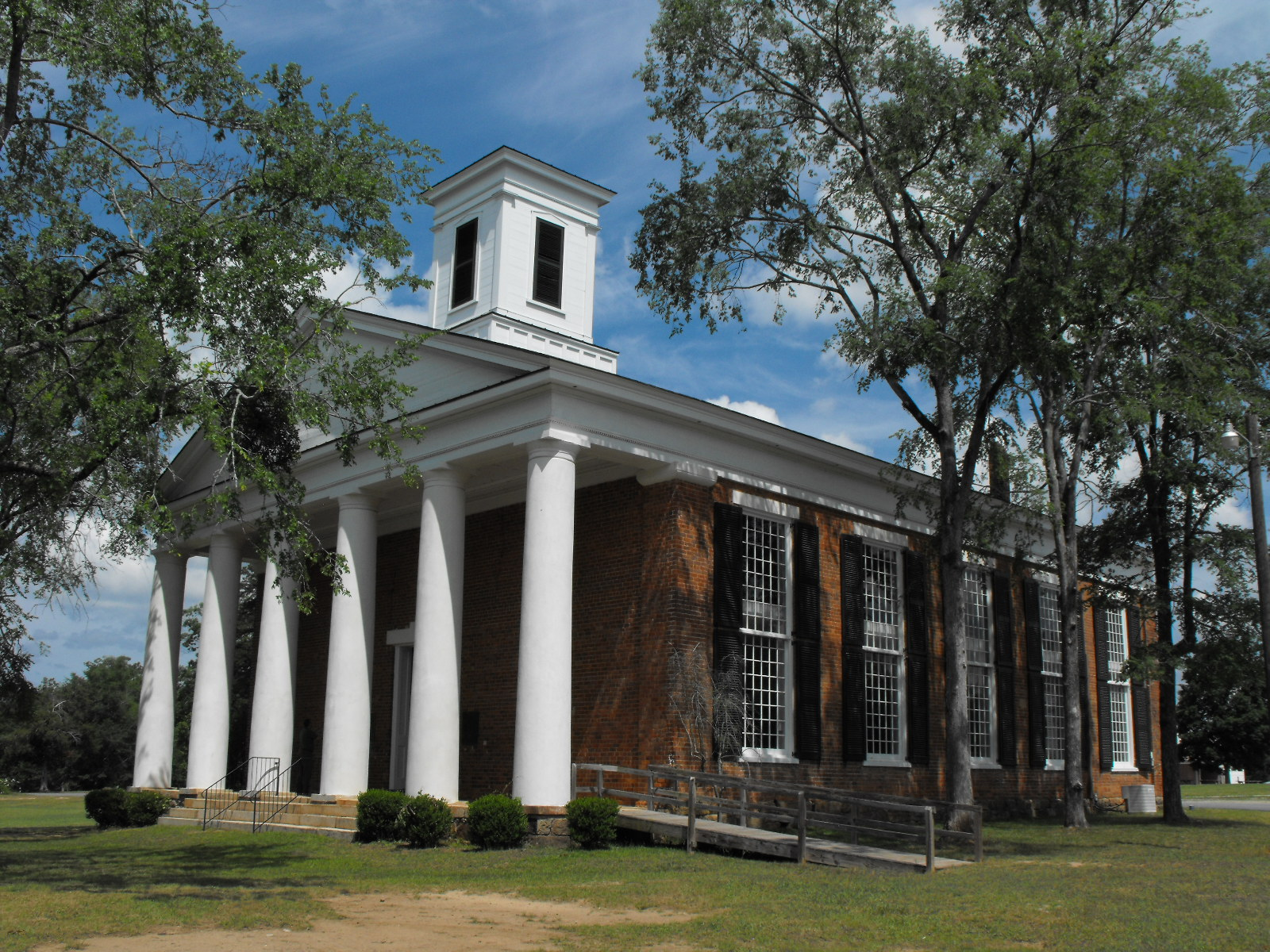
Old Mercer Chapel, constructed in 1845 and listed on the National Register of Historic Places, is located on the university's original campus in Penfield, Georgia

The College of Professional Advancement, formerly Penfield College of Mercer University, was founded in 2003 as the College of Continuing and Professional Studies and offers undergraduate and graduate degrees for working adults. Courses are offered on the Macon and Atlanta campuses and at the regional academic centers in Henry County, Douglas County, and Newnan. The college was named on July 1, 2014, to honor the legacy of Mercer's original location in Penfield, Georgia and to better reflect the college's breadth of academic offerings from certificate programs to doctoral-level degrees. Mercer maintains a portion of the original Penfield campus including historic Old Mercer Chapel and the gravesite of university founder Jesse Mercer.

The Public Safety Leadership Institute on the Atlanta campus offers educational programs for law enforcement and other public safety officials. The curriculum focuses on organizational leadership, liberal studies, and human resources administration within governmental organizations in the rapidly changing post 9/11 world. The institute has been endorsed by numerous law enforcement organizations.

The college's graduate-level programs include master's degrees in public safety, organizational leadership, school counseling, and clinical mental health counseling as well as an Educational Specialist degree in school counseling and a Doctor of Philosophy in Counselor Education and Supervision. In 2013, the college began offering graduate programs in human services and rehabilitation counseling.

=== School of Law ===
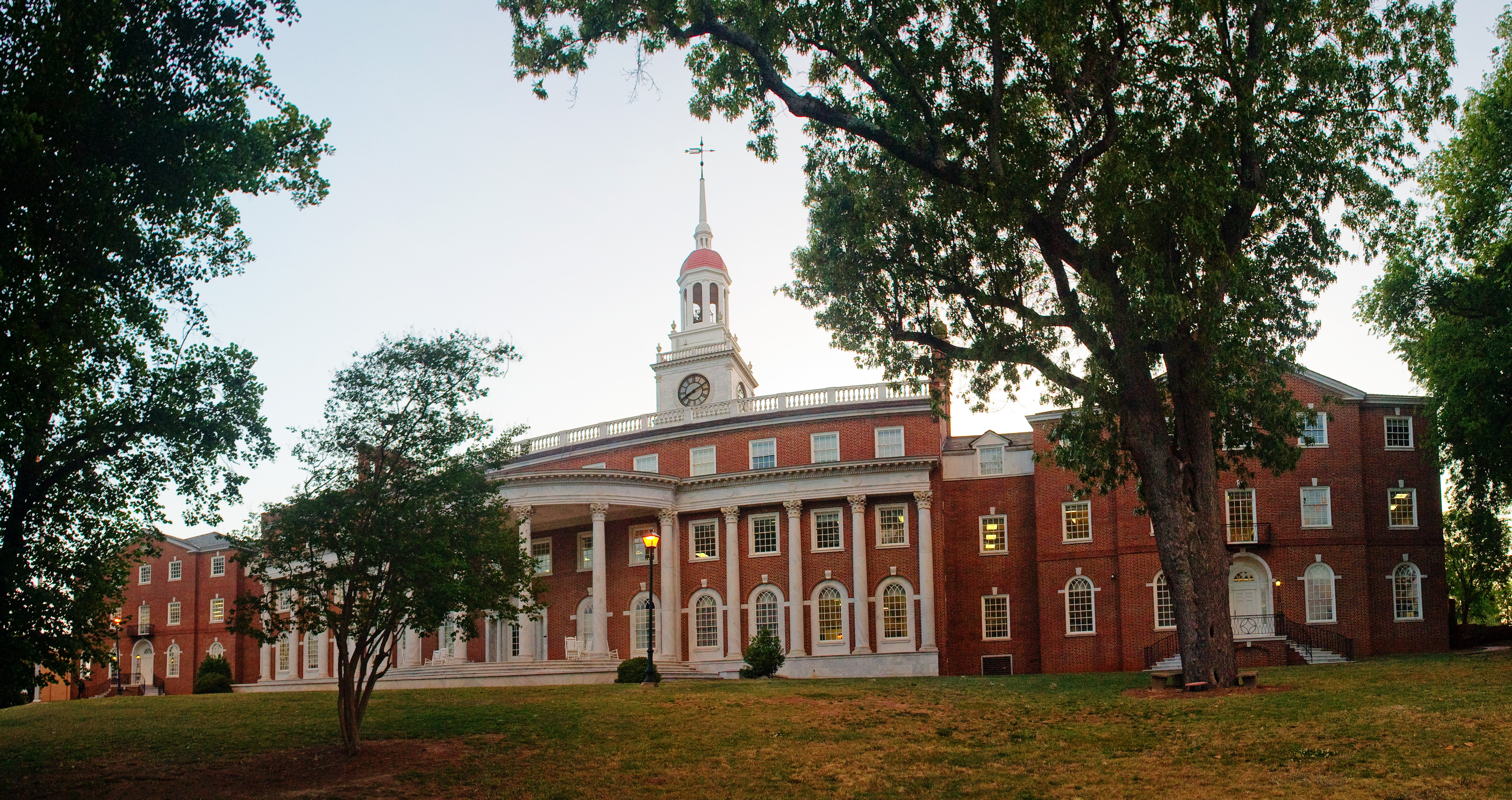
Mercer University School of Law

The Mercer University School of Law, founded in 1873, is one of the oldest law schools in the United States. The school was formerly named Walter F. George School of Law after Walter F. George, Mercer Law Class of 1901, who was a long-time United States Senator and was President pro tempore of the Senate. The School of Law offers the Juris Doctor (JD) degree and a joint Juris Doctor/Master of Business Administration (JD/MBA) in conjunction with the university's Stetson-Hatcher School of Business.

=== James and Carolyn McAfee School of Theology ===
The James and Carolyn McAfee School of Theology, founded in 1994, offers graduate theological programs and is affiliated with the Cooperative Baptist Fellowship. McAfee's curriculum is not directed by the Georgia Baptist Convention or Southern Baptist Convention. The school, located on the Atlanta campus, is named for James T. McAfee, Jr., former chairman of Mercer's board of trustees, and his wife Carolyn. The McAfees provided a founding endowment.

The McAfee School of Theology and the Cooperative Baptist Fellowship are "identity partners"; announced in 2006, the CBF provides funding for operating costs, scholarships, and collaborative projects. The designation, which grants the highest level of CBF funding, is held by four theology schools, the McAfee School of Theology, the George W. Truett Theological Seminary at Baylor University, the Divinity School at Campbell University, and the (now-closed) Baptist Theological Seminary at Richmond.

The American Baptist Historical Society (ABHS), with the largest and most diverse collection of Baptist historical materials and archives in the world, is located on the Atlanta campus. The ABHS moved to Atlanta in 2008 from Valley Forge, Pennsylvania and Rochester, New York. The organization is housed in the Mercer University Administration and Conference Center, formerly occupied by the Georgia Baptist Convention. The ABHS provides research opportunities for Baptist scholars and positions Mercer and the McAfee School of Theology as a national center of Baptist scholarship.

The Baptist History and Heritage Society (BHHS), founded in 1938 as the Southern Baptist Historical Society, relocated from Brentwood, Tennessee to the Atlanta campus in 2007. The BHHS, an independent organization with historic ties to the Southern Baptist Convention, is housed in the former Georgia Baptist Convention headquarters building along with the American Baptist Historical Society. The two organizations complement each other by providing resources on the American Baptist tradition and the Southern Baptist tradition, which further enhances Mercer's position as a national center of Baptist scholarship.

=== School of Medicine ===
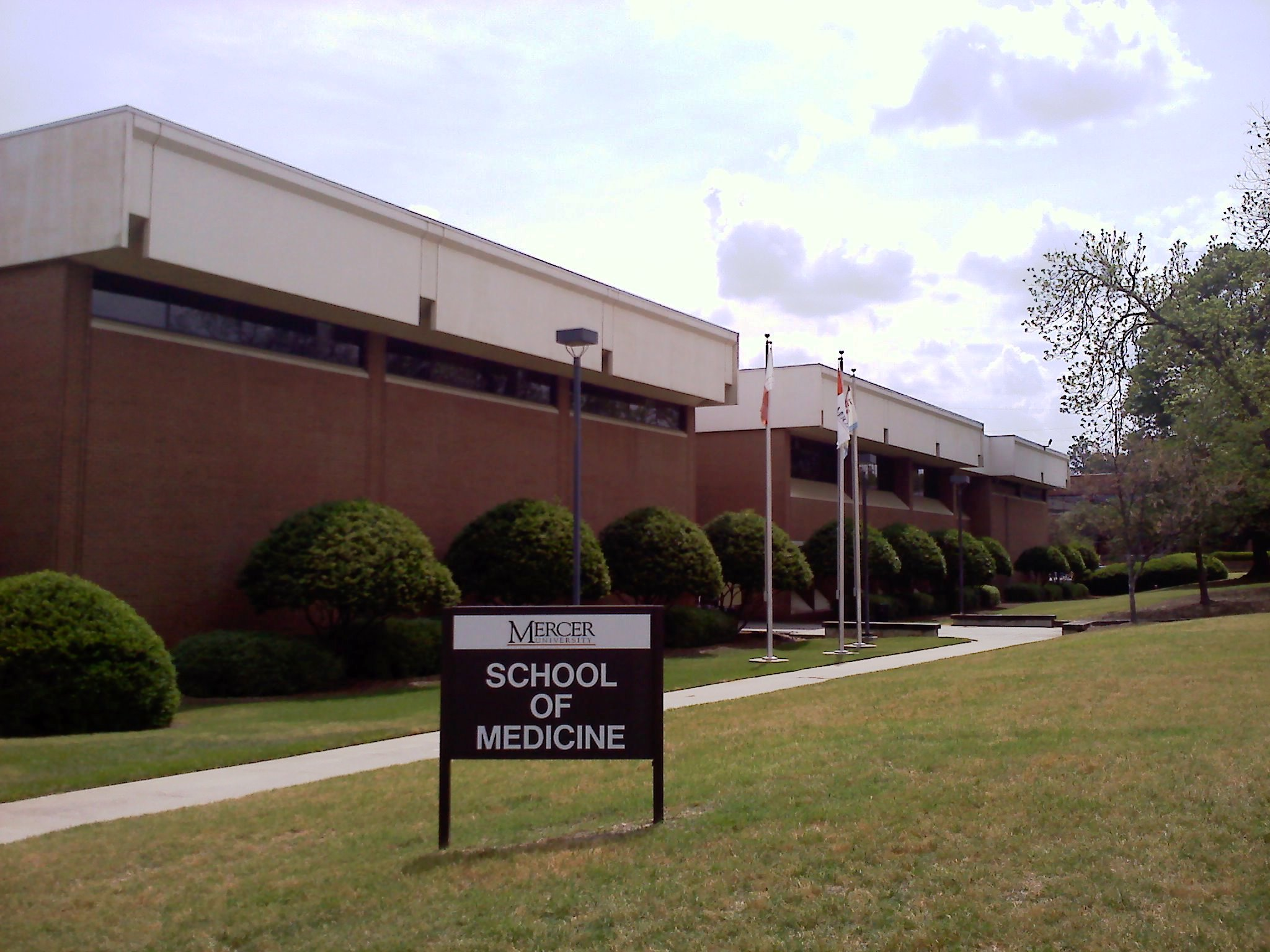
Medical Education Building in Macon

The Mercer University School of Medicine, founded in 1982, is partially state funded and accepts only Georgia residents into the Doctor of Medicine program. The school's core mission is to train primary care physicians and other health professionals for service in rural and medically underserved areas of Georgia. The school is consistently recognized for its focus on family medicine, and in 2005, U.S. News & World Report ranked the school 17th out of 126 accredited medical schools in the family medicine category. In addition to the Doctor of Medicine, the school offers master's programs in family therapy. The School of Medicine's teaching hospitals are the Medical Center of Central Georgia in Macon, Memorial University Medical Center in Savannah, The Medical Center and St. Francis Hospital in Columbus.

The School of Medicine received additional state funding in 2007 to expand its existing partnership with Memorial University Medical Center by establishing a four-year medical school in Savannah, the first medical school in southern Georgia. Third and fourth year Mercer students have completed clinical rotations at Memorial since 1996, approximately 100 residents are trained each year in a number of specialities. The expanded program opened in August 2008 with 30 first year students and Graduated its first M.D.'s in 2012. The School of Medicine's Macon and Savannah campuses are administered by Senior Associate Deans who report to one Dean. The new medical program furthers Mercer's mission to train primary care physicians for service in rural and medically underserved areas of Georgia.

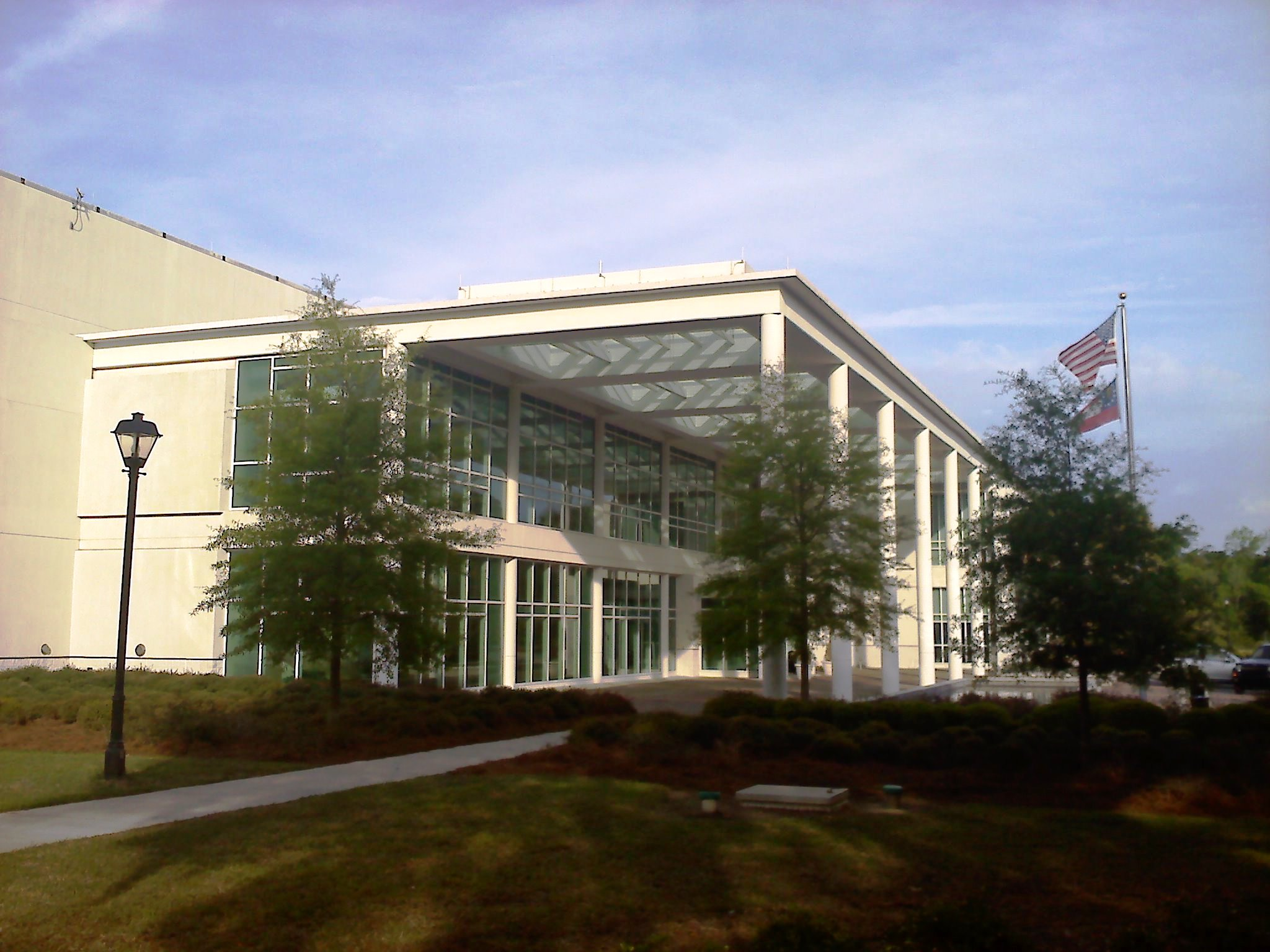
Medical Education Building in Savannah

The Center for Health and Learning is an educational partnership between the Georgia Baptist College of Nursing, the School of Medicine, and Piedmont Healthcare of Atlanta. The School of Medicine joined the partnership in September 2007 when it partnered with Piedmont to offer a Masters in family therapy on the Atlanta campus. Piedmont is a not-for-profit organization with several hospitals, including Piedmont Hospital and Piedmont Fayette Hospital, both recognized as among the best in the nation, a primary care physician group with approximately 20 clinics, and a physician network with approximately 500 members. Family therapy students are provided learning experiences at various facilities throughout the Piedmont system.

In April 2011, Mercer announced a new Doctor of Clinical Medical Psychology program with the first students to enroll in the fall of 2012.

In February 2012, Mercer announced the establishment of a third School of Medicine campus. The campus, in Columbus, joined existing locations in Macon and Savannah. The new campus partnered with two regional hospitals, The Medical Center and St. Francis Hospital, and offered clinical rotations for up to 80 third and fourth year students.

=== College of Pharmacy ===
The College of Pharmacy, founded in 1903, was an independent school in Atlanta until it merged with Mercer in 1959. The college, ranked by U.S. News & World Report among the top five private pharmacy schools in the country, moved from its downtown location to Mercer's Atlanta campus in 1992. In 1981, the college became the first in the southeast and the fifth in the nation to offer the Doctor of Pharmacy, the highest level of pharmacy education, as its sole professional degree.

The college was named the Southern School of Pharmacy until 2006 when it was renamed the College of Pharmacy and Health Sciences; the name change reflected new physician assistant and physical therapy programs. The college received its current name in 2013 when the physician assistant and physical therapy programs were shifted to the new College of Health Professions.

Mercer's football stadium (10,200 seats, completion 2013) – the Tony and Nancy Moye Football and Lacrosse Complex – is named for William Anthony (Tony) Moye, Pharmacy Class of 1973. Moye is a member of the university's board of trustees and is a major donor towards the stadium.

=== Georgia Baptist College of Nursing ===
The Georgia Baptist College of Nursing was founded in 1901 as the Baptist Tabernacle Infirmary, an independent institution in Atlanta. The college was renamed the Baptist Tabernacle Infirmary and Training School for Nurses when nursing education began in 1902. The college, named the Georgia Baptist College of Nursing in 1993, merged with Mercer in 2001 and moved from its downtown location to Mercer's Atlanta campus in 2002. The college offers undergraduate and graduate programs and provides clinical experiences at numerous Atlanta-area hospitals and at other community facilities.

The Center for Health and Learning is an educational partnership between the Georgia Baptist College of Nursing, the School of Medicine, and Piedmont Healthcare of Atlanta. Piedmont is a not-for-profit organization with several hospitals, including Piedmont Hospital and Piedmont Fayette Hospital, both recognized as among the best in the nation, a primary care physician group with approximately 20 clinics, and a physician network with approximately 500 members. Nursing students are provided clinical experiences at various facilities throughout the Piedmont system, as well as other medical facilities across the Atlanta metropolitan area.

The Georgia Baptist College of Nursing began offering the Doctor of Philosophy in Nursing degree in August 2009 and the Doctor of Nursing Practice degree in August 2010. Both programs are a part of Mercer's strategic plan to expand the university's doctoral programs.

=== College of Health Professions ===
The College of Health Professions opened on July 1, 2013. Mercer's twelfth academic unit offers the Doctor of Physical Therapy degree along with master's-level physician assistant and public health programs previously offered by the College of Pharmacy and the School of Medicine. The new college allows for the addition of future health sciences programs, such as occupational therapy, as well as expansion of existing programs on multiple Mercer campuses.

=== Reputation and rankings ===
Academic rankings

National
- Forbes: 285
- U.S. News & World Report: 165 (tie)
- Washington Monthly: 173
- WSJ/College Pulse: 194

U.S. News & World Report placed Mercer in its National Universities category, with the university ranked 165th nationally. The Princeton Review, in its 2018 "Best 382 Colleges" guide, ranks Mercer in the top 10% of all colleges and universities nationwide.

In 2007, Mercer was one of 141 colleges and universities selected for the first President's Higher Education Community Service Honor Roll; the honor roll is sponsored by several agencies including the United States Department of Education and the United States Department of Housing and Urban Development to recognize support for community service. Mercer applied for and received national recognition in 2008 from the Carnegie Foundation for the Advancement of Teaching for the university's commitment to community engagement.

== Research ==
The Mercer Engineering Research Center (MERC) is located in a state-of-the-art research facility in Warner Robins, Georgia. This new facility is located a short drive from Robins Air Force Base and provides upgraded physical security, staff offices, laboratories, classrooms, and a large conference facility. Established in 1987 as an extension of the School of Engineering, MERC has extensive research agreements with Robins Air Force Base and the U.S. Department of Defense, as well as with private concerns. Providing a broad range of customer oriented services to commercial and government clients, MERC's offerings include: management consulting, logistics consulting and analysis, systems engineering, structural and mechanical engineering, information technology consulting, software engineering, and various areas of industrial process and equipment design.

== Student life ==
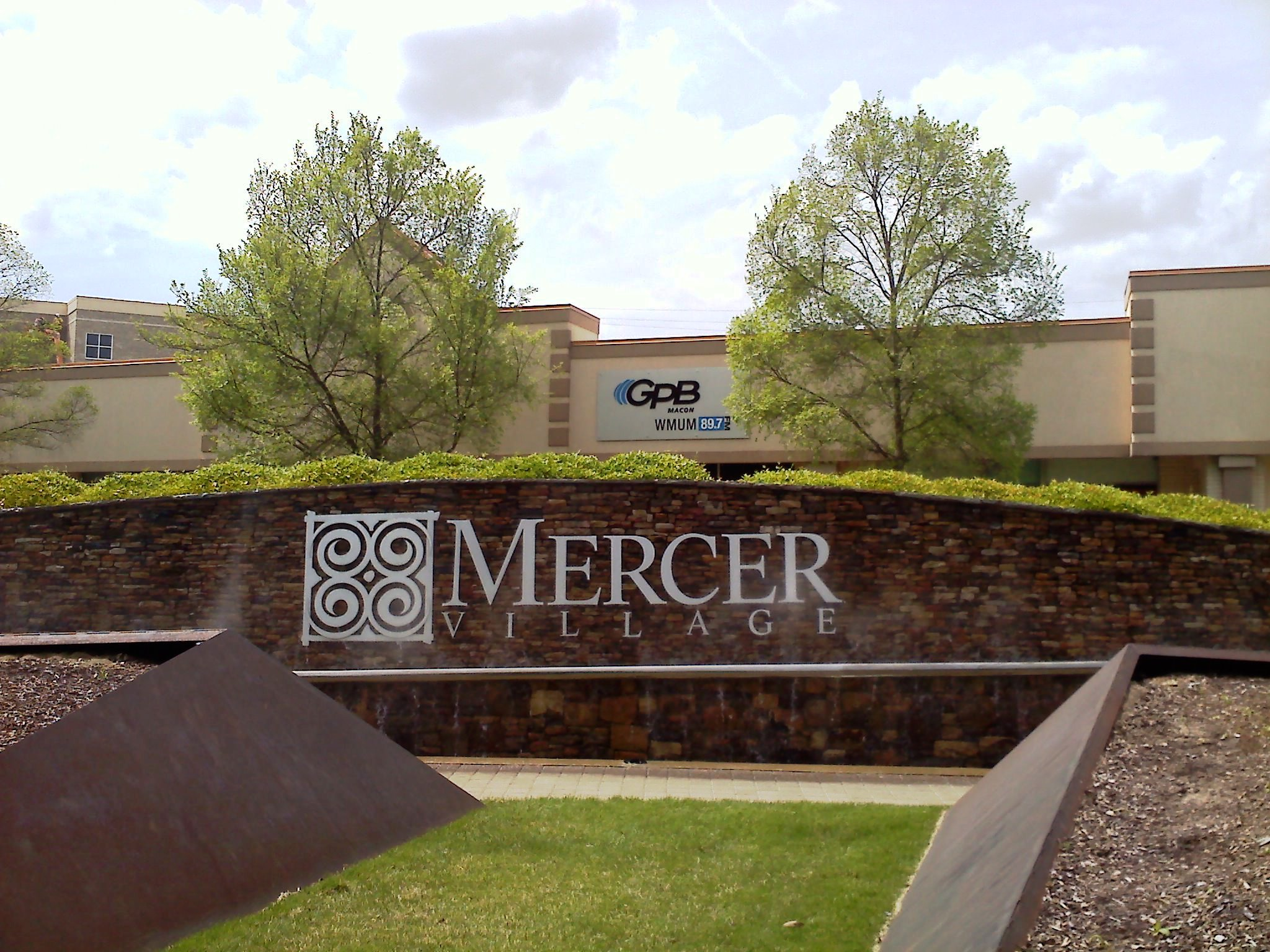
WMUM-FM, located in Mercer Village, an academic-residential-retail area on the Macon campus

=== Opera House ===
The Grand Opera House is a county-owned performing arts center operated by Mercer. Located in downtown Macon and listed on the National Register of Historic Places, the Grand opened in 1884 with the largest stage in the southeastern United States. The Grand has hosted vaudeville performances, Broadway touring companies, community theatre, concerts, movies, and numerous other events. Mercer has operated the Grand since 1995 through a lease agreement with Bibb County. The Grand has undergone extensive renovation and regularly hosts special events that are open to the community.

=== University Press ===
The Mercer University Press (MUP), established in 1979, is the only Baptist-related university press in the nation. MUP has published more than 1,000 books generally in the areas of theology, religion, Southern culture, biography, history, literature and music. MUP's annual Authors Luncheon, a book-signing event in Atlanta, is Georgia's premier literary event. Former President Jimmy Carter and civil rights activist Will D. Campbell are among MUP's published authors. Campbell's book The Stem of Jesse, a history of Mercer in the 1960s, discusses integration of the university. The book, named for university founder Jesse Mercer, profiles notable alumni including Sam Oni and Samaria Mitcham Bailey. Oni was the first student of African descent to be admitted to Mercer University. Bailey was one of the first African-American female students at Mercer.

=== Radio station ===
Mercer established its first radio station as a physics class project in 1922. The call sign was WMAZ, which stood for "Watch Mercer Attain Zenith". The student-run station operated from the tower of Willingham Chapel until 1927 when Mercer gave WMAZ to the Macon Junior Chamber of Commerce. WMAZ was purchased by the Southeastern Broadcasting Company in 1935 and a television station added with the same call sign in 1953. The radio station was subsequently dropped, but the television station remains a CBS affiliate, WMAZ-TV Channel 13.

Mercer and Georgia Public Broadcasting partnered in 2006 to create WMUM-FM, formerly WDCO-FM. The station provides local content to central Georgia public radio listeners from its broadcast studio on the Macon campus. The station's call sign was changed to WMUM-FM to identify the partnership with "Mercer University Macon". The studio, constructed in 2006, offers various media-related educational opportunities for Mercer students.

=== Television station ===
WMUB-LD, virtual channel 38 (UHF digital channel 31), is a low-powered France 24-affiliated television station owned by Mercer University and serving Macon, Georgia. WMUB-LD's transmitter is located along GA 87/US 23/US 129 ALT (Golden Isles Highway), along the Bibb–Twiggs county line. The station is available on all major cable providers in Central Georgia.

The station had previously broadcast since 2010 as an affiliate of America One as WRWR-LD, operating from studios located on Radio Loop in Warner Robins. In late December 2011, WRWR-LD changed its affiliation to My Family TV. On November 1, 2013, and to Cozi TV. On March 31, 2014, Georgia Eagle Media donated WRWR-LD to Mercer University. Mercer planned to move WRWR's master control facilities and operations from its existing Warner Robins studio to a facility located on the Mercer University campus that currently houses the College Hill Alliance and Georgia Public Broadcasting television station WMUM-TV (channel 29). At midnight that day, WRWR-LD became an affiliate of MHz WorldView.

In mid-July 2014, WRWR-LD changed its callsign to WMUB-LD. On January 1, 2016, WMUB-LD changed affiliation to France 24. The station carried Universal Sports on its second digital subchannel until January 1, 2012, when the network converted into a cable- and satellite-only network. On January 2, 2012, the station began carrying Tuff TV on its second digital subchannel (the network was dropped on March 31, 2014). On February 2, 2021, WMUB-LD transitioned from RF channel 38 to RF channel 31.

The station's digital channel is multiplexed:

Channel	Video	Aspect	Short name	Programming
38.1	480i	16:9	WMUB 38	Main WMUB-LD programming / France 24

=== Student newspaper ===
The Mercer Cluster, commonly referred to as The Cluster, is a student-run, editorially-independent news organization for Mercer's main Macon campus. The organization began as a newspaper in 1920 and was named after a book of songs penned by the university's founder Jesse Mercer in 1810. The Cluster's website went live in 2011, and both print and digital publication were maintained until 2022, when the news publication announced it would be transitioning to digital-only. Today, The Cluster's website publishes consistently throughout the academic year.

=== Debating Societies ===
Founded in 1897, Mercer's debating society is the oldest organization on Mercer's campus as well as the oldest debating society in the entire state of Georgia. In 1898, Mercer's champion orator, John Roach Straton, won the first Intercollegiate Oratorical Championships in Atlanta. Debate continued to be a significant intercollegiate sport for many years after that, with Walter F. George, namesake of Mercer's law school, leading a team to victory over the University of Georgia at the Mercer-Athens Debate in 1899.

In March 2018, the student team of Jazmine Buckley and Kyle Bligen became the first all-African-American duo to win the National Parliamentary Debate championship at the nation's largest parliamentary debate tournament. Buckley as a freshman in 2015 became the first freshman and the first African-American to be named top speaker at the NPDA tournament. Buckley outranked 320 other debaters representing top programs such as the University of California, Berkeley, Wheaton, Rice and Whitman to receive the James "Al" Johnson Top Speaker Award. That same year, Lindsey Hancock and Hunter Pilkinton competed at the National Parliamentary Tournament of Excellence (NPTE) at William Jewell College in Missouri. The duo from Mercer was the first team from the university and the state of Georgia to attend the NPTE, the most prestigious parliamentary debate tournament in the nation. Also in 2015, the Hancock-Pilkinton duo became the first Mercer team to win the Georgia Parliamentary Debate Association State Championships, with Hancock being the first woman to win the state title.

== Athletics ==
Mercer fields eighteen (18) teams, known as the Bears, on the NCAA Division I level (FCS, formerly I-AA, for football); all teams compete in the Southern Conference except women's sand volleyball, which is not sponsored by the SoCon, and thus competes in the ASUN Conference. Men's teams include baseball, basketball, cross-country, football, golf, lacrosse, soccer, and tennis. Women's teams include basketball, cross-country, golf, lacrosse, sand volleyball, soccer, softball, tennis, track and field, and volleyball.

Mercer was a charter member of the ASUN Conference, originally called the Trans American Athletic Conference, from 1978 to 2014. Mercer teams won 21 Atlantic Sun championships: five baseball, six men's basketball, two women's basketball, five men's soccer, and one each in women's soccer, men's lacrosse, and men's golf. The men's basketball team won the 2012 CollegeInsider.com Postseason Tournament and in 2014 defeated Duke in the first round of the NCAA tournament.

=== Facilities ===
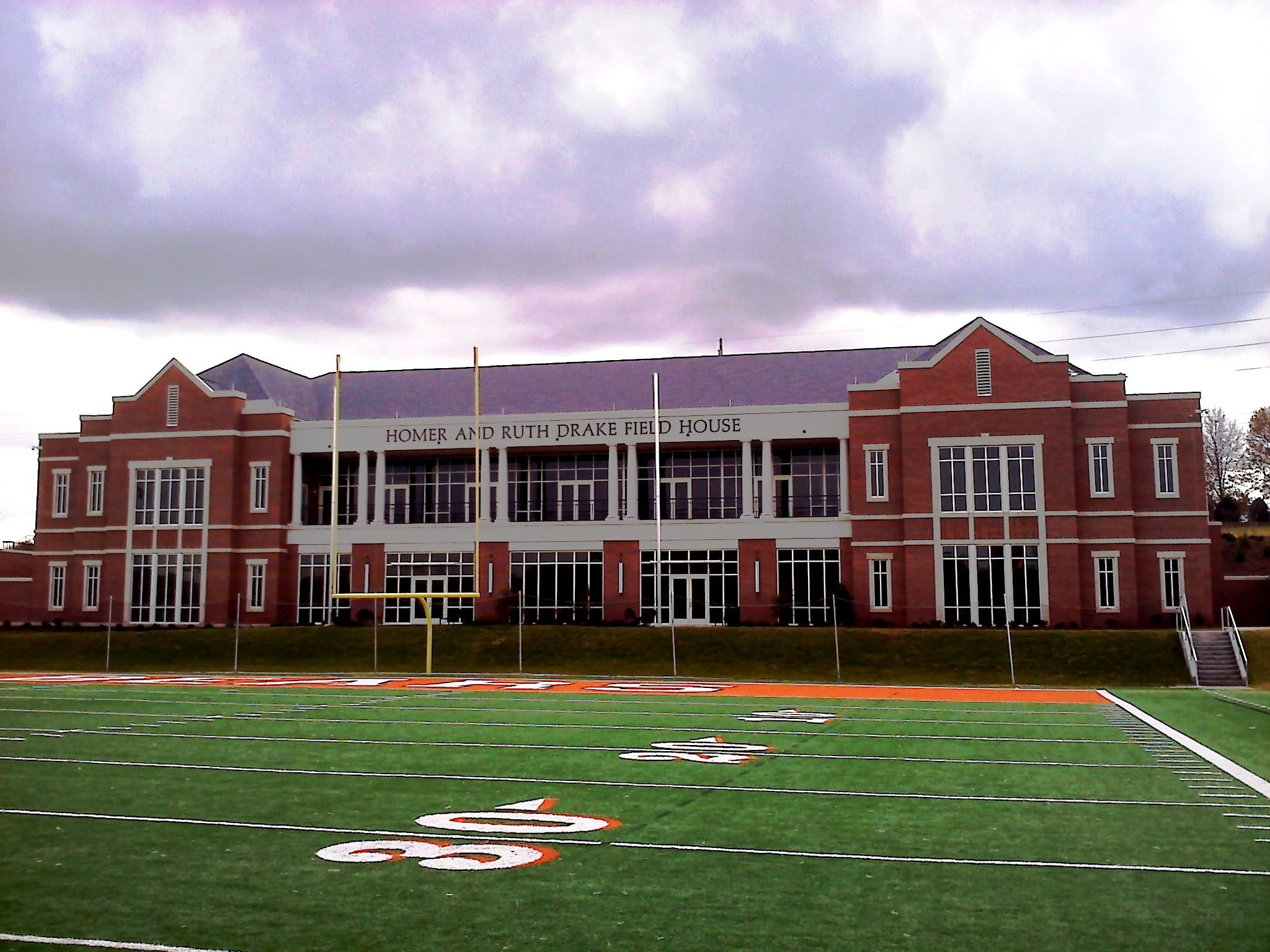
Homer and Ruth Drake Field House, a component of the Tony and Nancy Moye Football and Lacrosse Complex

Mercer opened the University Center on the Macon campus in 2004. The $40 million 230,000-square-foot (21,000 m^{2}) center houses Mercer's athletics department, a 3,500-seat basketball arena, an indoor pool, work-out facilities, intramural basketball courts, a food court, and numerous meeting facilities. Mercer's baseball, softball, and intramural fields are next to the center along with the university's tennis complex and football-lacrosse complex. The basketball arena was named Hawkins Arena in 2012; the naming honors J. B. Hawkins, former high school athletic director and basketball coach in Crawford County, Georgia.

Mercer opened the Tony and Nancy Moye Football and Lacrosse Complex (10,200 seats) in 2013. The stadium is adjacent to the University Center and Mercer's other athletic facilities. On February 26, 2015, the stadium portion of the complex was named Five Star Stadium in recognition of a multimillion-dollar financial commitment to Mercer athletics by Five Star Automotive Group, which owns dealerships in Georgia, Tennessee and South Carolina.

Hilton Garden Inn operates a 101-room hotel on university-owned land adjacent to the University Center and the Moye Complex.

Mercer's facilities are located next to Interstate 75. Large parking lots are available for visitors-spectators arriving via the Mercer University Drive exit.

=== Men's basketball ===
Mercer received national attention in 2014 when the men's basketball team defeated Duke University in the second round of the NCAA Tournament; the team was defeated by the University of Tennessee in the third round. The team finished the season with a 27–9 record, Mercer's third straight with more than 20 victories. In honor of its win over Duke, Mercer received the 2014 Espy Award for Best Upset.

=== Football ===
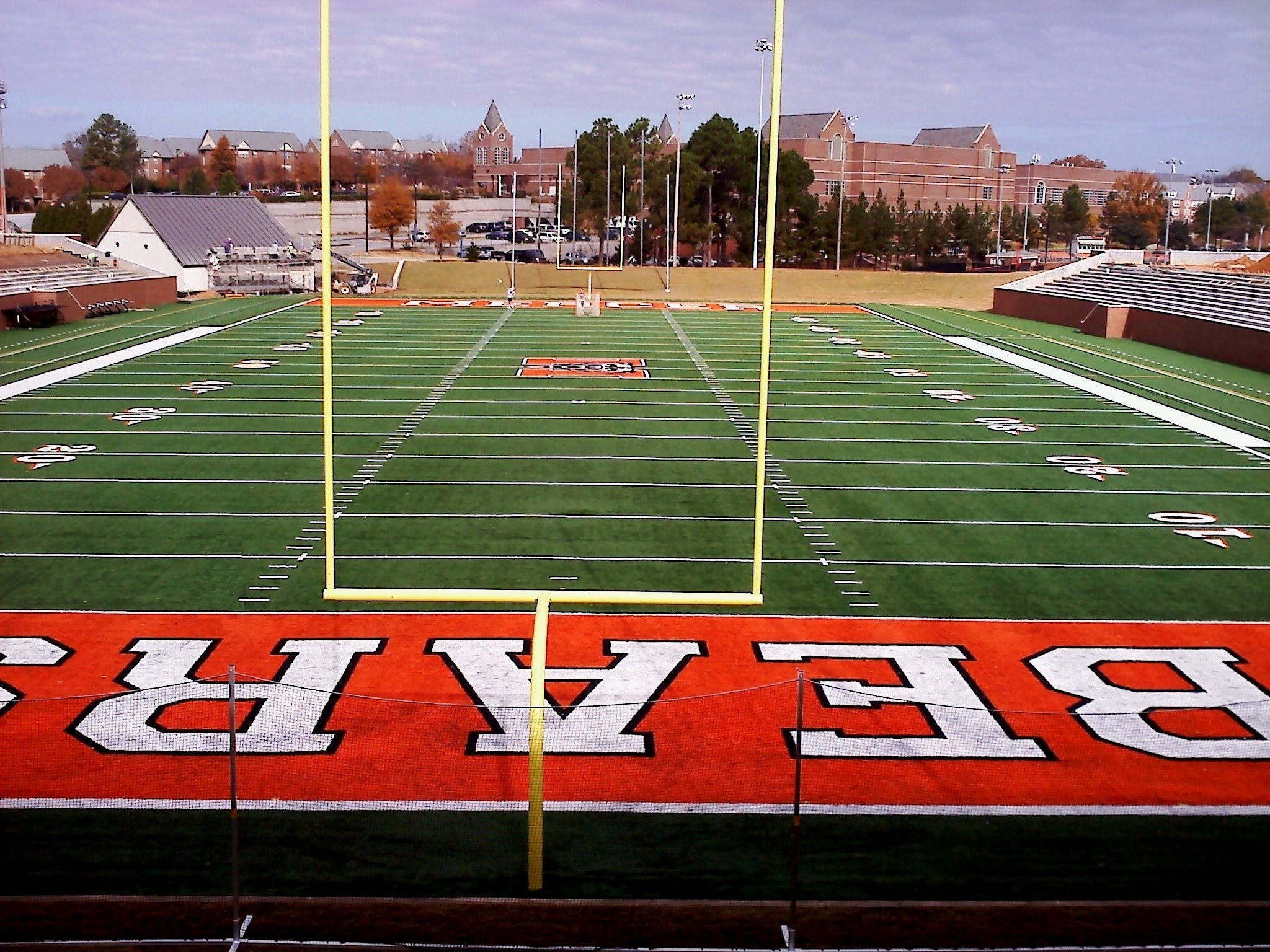
Moye Complex under construction

On November 19, 2010, Mercer announced the reinstatement of intercollegiate football beginning in the fall of 2013. The university competed as an NCAA Division I, non-scholarship program in the Pioneer Football League in 2013, and is now a scholarship program in the Southern Conference. Reinstatement came after a 70-year hiatus; Mercer suspended football during World War II and did not revive it. The final game was in 1941.

Mercer played its first game in 72 years on August 31, 2013; the team defeated Reinhardt University before an overflow crowd (12,172 spectators) at the Tony and Nancy Moye Football and Lacrosse Complex. Mercer finished the 2013 season undefeated at home with a 10–2 win–loss record (the two road losses were to the University of San Diego and Marist College) setting an NCAA Division I record for wins (10) by a start-up football program; Mercer had eight home wins, also an NCAA Division I record tied the same year (2013) by Auburn University, the FBS national runner-up, and Sam Houston State University who achieved its eighth victory in the FCS post-season.

Mercer won its first Southern Conference game on September 27, 2014; the team defeated Virginia Military Institute on the road in Lexington, Virginia. Mercer finished the season with an overall 6–6 win–loss record (1–5 in the conference) with only half the team on scholarship due to start-up restrictions.

== People ==
Mercer alumni include former Governor of Georgia Nathan Deal, the Chief Justice of Georgia, three members of the Georgia Court of Appeals including the Chief Judge, the Mayor of Macon, and the President of the State Bar of Georgia.

Mercer University alumni also include 21 United States Representatives, 12 governors, four United States Senators, two Pulitzer Prize winners, two Rhodes Scholars and a U.S. Attorney General.

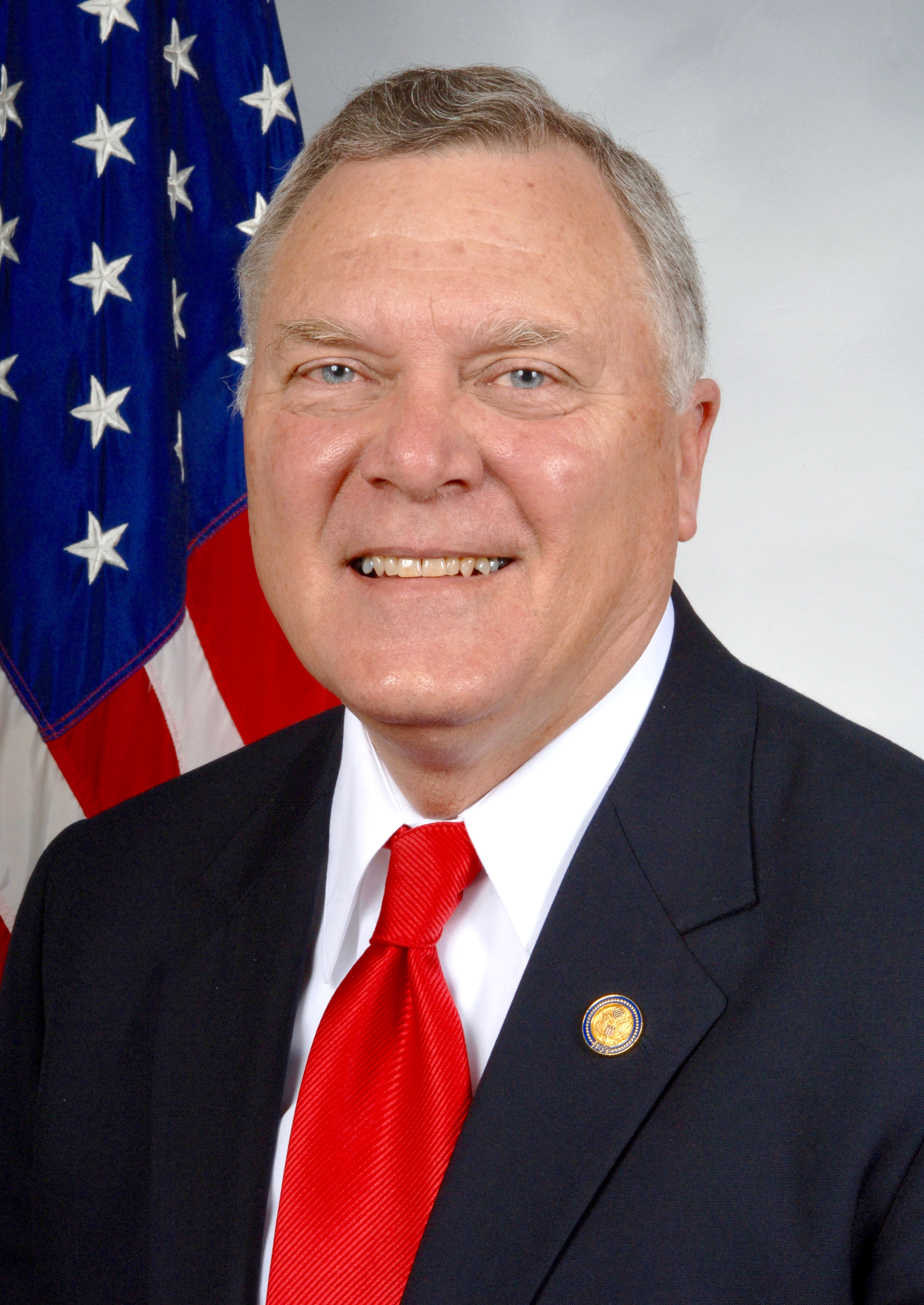
Nathan Deal '66, elected in 2010, is a former Governor of Georgia, 2011–2019.

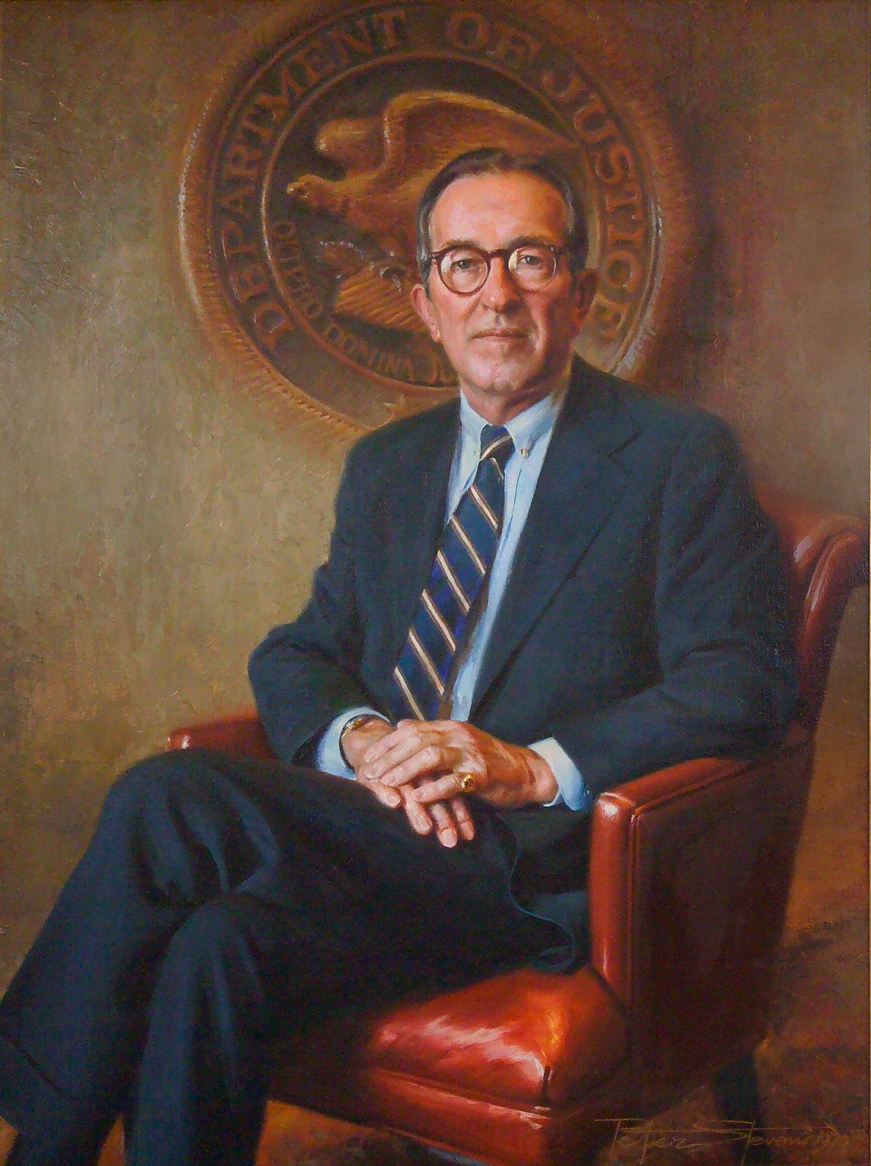
Griffin Bell '48, Attorney General of the United States, 1977–1979.

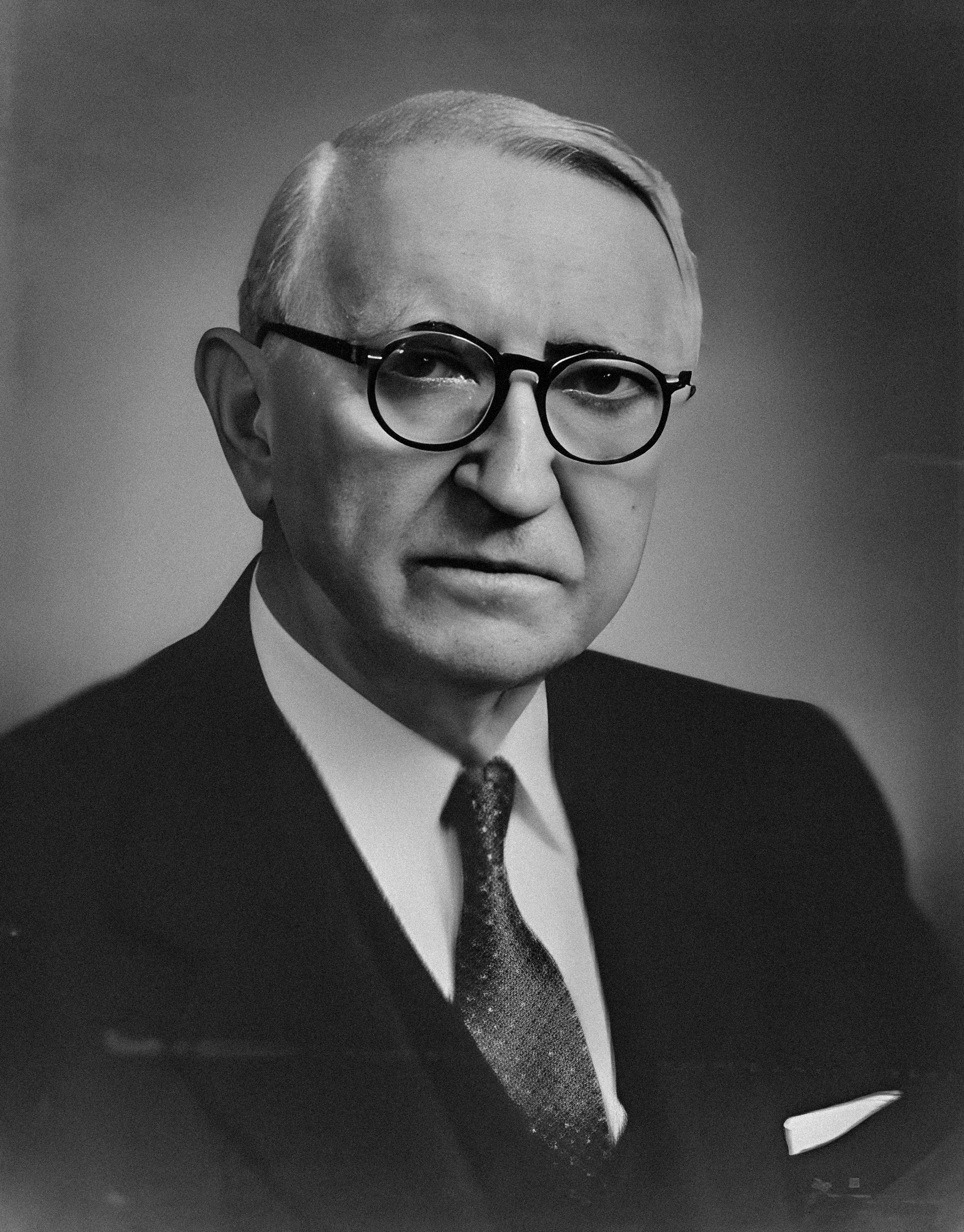
Walter F. George '01, United States Senator, 1922–1957; President pro tempore, 1955–1957; namesake of Mercer Law School.

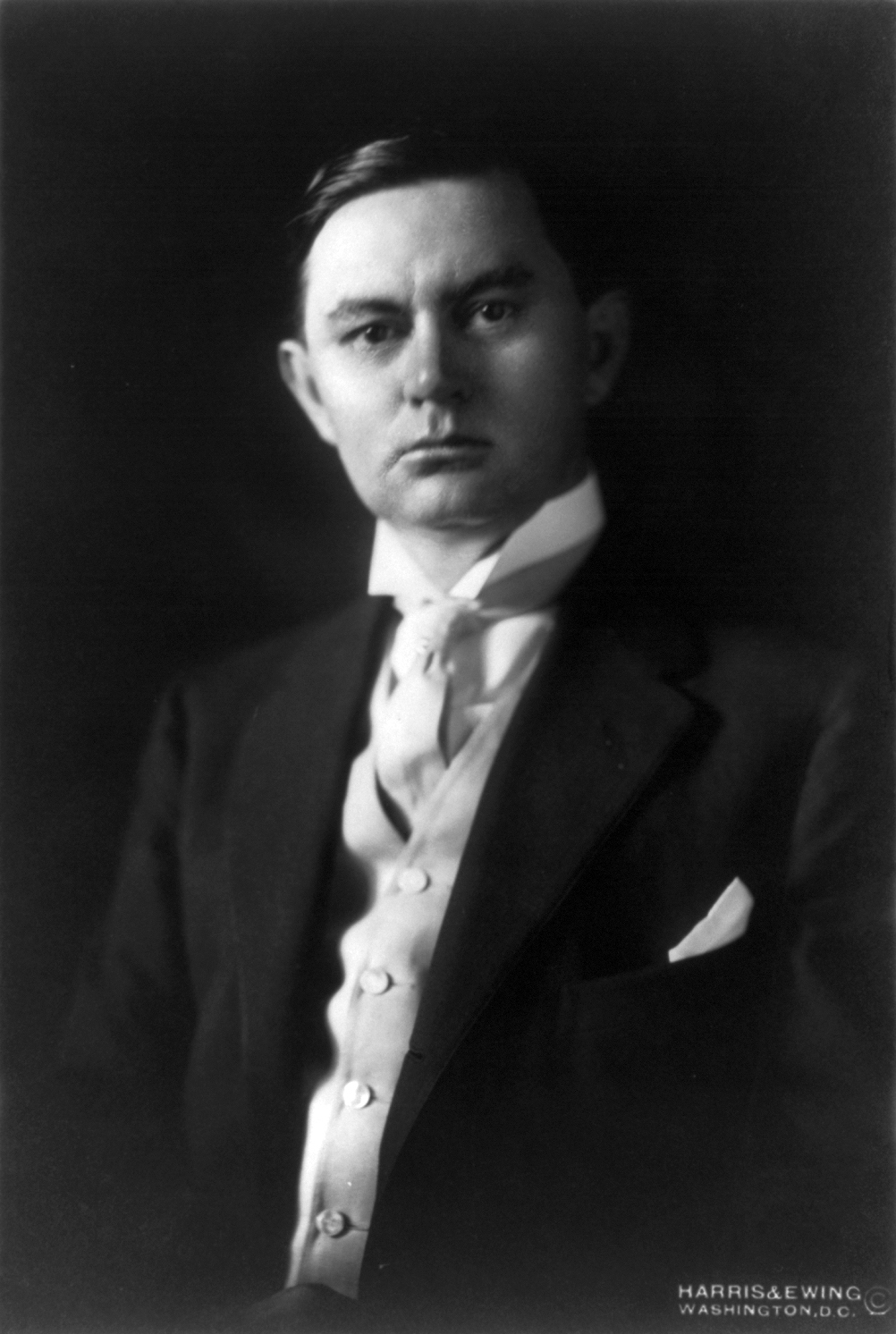
Thomas W. Hardwick '(18)92, United States Senator, 1914–1919; Governor of Georgia, 1921–1923.

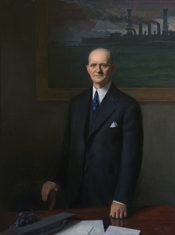
Carl Vinson '02, United States Representative, 1914–1965; the first person to serve more than 50 years in the House of Representatives and namesake of the USS Carl Vinson, a nuclear-powered aircraft carrier.

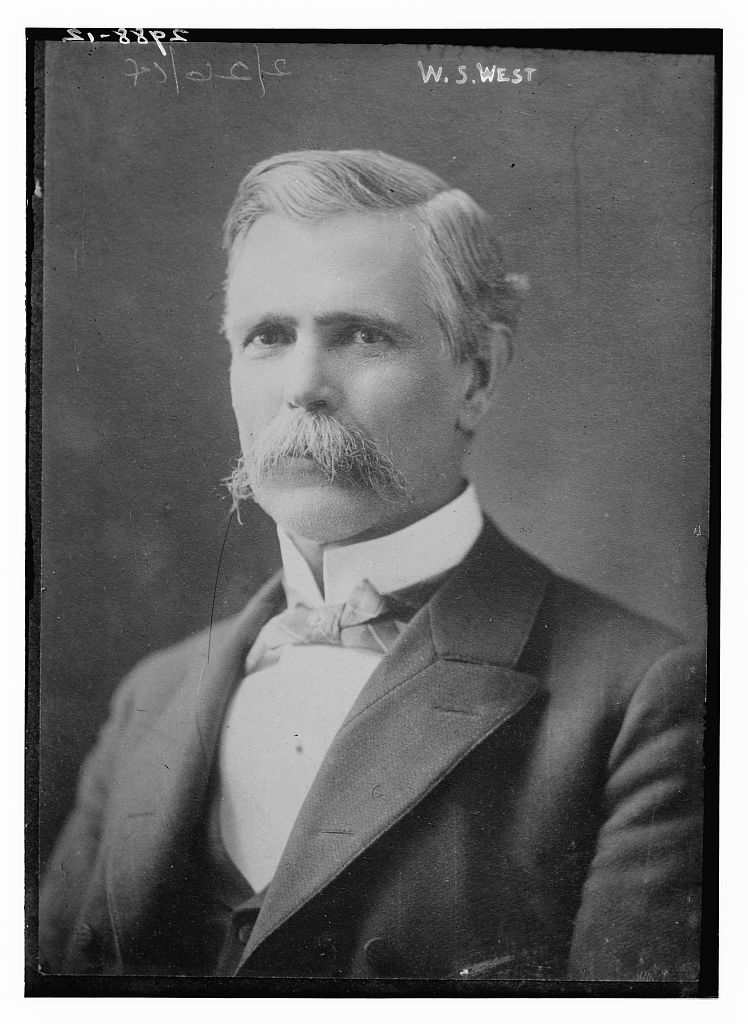
William S. West '(18)76, United States Senator, 1914; instrumental in the founding of Valdosta State University.

== See also ==
- Claude Smith Field
- List of colleges and universities in metropolitan Atlanta
