= Georgia Research Alliance =

The Georgia Research Alliance is an Atlanta, Georgia-based nonprofit organization that coordinates research efforts between Georgia's public and private sectors. While the GRA receives a state appropriation for investment in university-based research opportunities, its operations are funded through foundation and industry contributions. In its first 19 years, the GRA leveraged $525 million in state funding into $2.6 billion of additional federal and private investment. The university partners include the following institutions:

- University of Georgia
- Augusta University
- Emory University
- Clark Atlanta University
- Georgia Institute of Technology
- Georgia State University
- Mercer University
- Morehouse School of Medicine

== See also ==
- University System of Georgia
