= Monroe F. Swilley Jr. Library =

Coordinates: 33°52′25″N 84°15′38″W

The Monroe F. Swilley Jr. Library serves as the information center for the Cecil B. Day campus of Mercer University in Atlanta. It is named in honor of the late Dr. Monroe F. Swilley, the first chairman of the board of trustees and only president of the Atlanta Baptist College (1968–1972). When the Atlanta Baptist College merged with Mercer University in 1972, Dr. Swilley assumed the Mercer University position of vice president.

== About ==
The Swilley Library serves the faculty and students of Mercer University on the Cecil B. Day Campus in Atlanta, Georgia. It is the primary information resource center for over 2,600 students in the College of Pharmacy and Health Sciences, the McAfee School of Theology, the Atlanta programs of the Stetson School of Business and Economics, the Tift College of Education, the College of Continuing and Professional Studies, the English Language Institute, and the Georgia Baptist College of Nursing. Additionally, many of the approximately 1,800 students at the Regional Academic Centers in Henry County and Douglas County use the services of Swilley Library.
