= St. Francis Hospital (Columbus, Georgia) =

Coordinates: 32.5060°N 84.9605°W

St. Francis Hospital is a general medical and surgical hospital located in Columbus, Georgia, United States, and is accredited by the Joint Commission.

== History ==
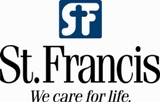

In 1946, Columbus citizens raised $45 million in seed money for a modern faith-based hospital. The first patient was admitted in April 1950.

During the first year, the hospital admitted 4,733 patients. The hospital expanded from a 154-bed hospital with 17 sisters, 171 lay people, and 60 physicians into a facility licensed for 376 beds with more than 1,400 full-time associates, 300 physicians, and services including the area's only open heart surgery program.

As of 2024, St. Francis Hospital is a part of Emory Healthcare.The hospital runs the St. Francis Foundation, which was structured and incorporated on November 21, 1991.

== The Patrick Heart Institute of St. Francis ==

The Patrick Heart Institute of St. Francis is a source for diagnosis, treatment and rehabilitation of patients with heart problems. St Francis was the first hospital in the area to perform open heart surgery, balloon angioplasty and automatic defibrillator tissue implants.

The Institute utilizes diagnostic procedures to provide accurate analysis in order to determine treatment for patients with cardiovascular disease. Cardiologists at St. Francis have performed more than 15,000 cardiac catheterizations in the cardiac diagnostic laboratory. After a cardiac problem is accurately diagnosed, The Patrick Heart Institute of St. Francis - along with the patient's physician - can provide appropriate treatment through a number of valuable methods. The Cardiac Rehabilitation Program at St. Francis Hospital is specifically designed for patients that have experienced: heart attack, heart surgery, heart angioplasty or stent, or a high risk for heart disease.

== St. Francis Orthopaedic Institute ==
On August 1, 2006, St. Francis Hospital along with the physicians at McCluskey Orthopaedic Surgery (MOS) formed the St. Francis Orthopaedic Institute. The Institute collaborates with St. Francis Hospital; the St. Francis Rehabilitation Center; and the McCluskey Education & Research Foundation, Inc. There is a nearby Research and Education Center.

== The Elena Diaz-Verson Amos Center for Breast Health at St. Francis ==
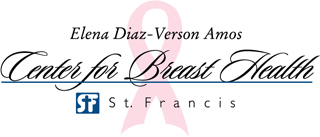

The hospital's breast cancer center provides local therapy as well as systemic therapy, to both destroy the cancer cells held in the breast as well as the related lymph nodes, as well as to destroy tumor cells that may have diluted into the circulation. In 2008, St. Francis became the first facility in Georgia to offer Breast-Specific Gamma imaging for difficult to diagnose breast abnormalities.

== Other Services ==
=== The Bradley Center ===
Founded in 1955, The Bradley Center campus is an 84-bed facility aimed at providing an environment for mental health care.

=== Franciscan Woods ===
Franciscan Woods is an assisted living community provided by St. Francis Hospital Hospital.

==== The St. Francis Wellness Center ====
The 16,662-square-foot (1,548.0 m^{2}) facility houses cardiovascular machines.

==== The Trinity Center for Women ====
The Trinity Center for Women is a community service of St. Francis that offers prenatal care to expecting mothers.

== Milestones ==
=== 1950 - 1960 ===
- St. Francis Hospital admits its first patient April 17, 1950.
- The first baby is born at St. Francis before February 1951.
- St. Francis breaks ground for a School of Nursing in 1957; it opens in 1959.

=== 1961 - 1970 ===
- In 1966, the hospital's leadership begins planning for a six-story addition that would add 58 beds to the facility.

=== 1971 - 1980 ===
- From 1971 to 1974, a $6.5 million expansion program doubles the number of beds to 138, while adding space and equipment for X-ray, operating rooms and physical therapy.
- Dr. Philip Brewer, along with surgeon Dr. Frank Collins, cardiologist Dr. Gordon Miller and perfusionist John Schumacher, develop the area's first cardiac surgery program at St. Francis Hospital; in 1974, Dr. Brewer performs the hospital's first open heart surgery.
- By 1977, hospital leadership plans for the addition of a $1.5 million laboratory and operating room in order to handle the ever-increasing number of open heart surgeries at St. Francis.
- Orthopaedic surgery and rehabilitation programs are developed during the 70s at St. Francis.

=== 1981 - 1990 ===
- In 1981, a $4.7 million expansion enlarges facilities for respiratory and physical therapy, including a cardiac rehabilitation gym.
- Safety cab is launched in 1982 to help reduce the number of DUI-related accidents that regularly occurred during the holidays, the program offers a free ride home to party goers.
- In 1984, St. Francis starts a pulmonary rehabilitation program.
- By 1986, St. Francis receives a Certificate of Need (CON) from the Georgia State Health Planning agency for a $9.3 million expansion.
- Additional expansion in 1987 includes a larger Emergency Department, Intensive Care Unit, Cardiac Care Unit, expanded Radiology Department, new procedure rooms as well as new waiting rooms.

=== 1991 - 2000 ===
- In 1994, St. Francis purchases The Bradley Center, a non profit psychiatric hospital.
- In 1995, St. Francis opens Health Matters, a community resource center.
- In the fall of 1997, St. Francis completes a two-year renovation project of all acute inpatient units. In response to patient requests, the renovation includes the creation of more private rooms. During the same year, St. Francis commissions plans for renovation; the project begins in late 1997.
- In December 1997, the Wound Care Center of St. Francis opens.
- In 1998, renovations are complete, creating a newly designed front entrance and new central energy plant. Also, The Heart Institute of St. Francis partners with the Emory Heart Center in July 1998 to offer the area its first complete electrophysiology test.
- In June 1999, St. Francis breaks ground for an assisted living facility; Franciscan Woods opens April 15, 2000.
- In December 2000, The American Diabetes Association recognizes the Diabetes Self-Management Program at St. Francis Hospital.
- In 2000, Dr. Thomas Lawhorne of Columbus Cardiovascular Surgery performs the region's first 'less invasive' procedure for abdominal aortic aneurysms.
- To celebrate its 50th anniversary, St. Francis partners with the American Heart Association and donates 50 automated external defibrillators (AEDs) throughout Columbus; the largest single deployment of AEDs in Georgia to ever take place.

=== 2001 - 2010 ===
- In 2002, St. Francis becomes only the 5th hospital in the United States to utilize the Bridge MedPoint System in order to help prevent errors at patients' bedsides.
- In 2002, the Emergency Department of St. Francis sees 42,000 patients, which is an increase of 4,000 people from 2001.
- The Patrick Heart Institute of St. Francis opens a Sleep Disorders Center in 2002.
- In 2003, St. Francis completes a three-year $45 million expansion, resulting in new surgical suites; the addition of a new sterile processing are for added safety; and an Emergency Department (ED). The new ED offers a 'fast track' to expedite the care of non-critically ill patients.
- In 2003, the new Medical Office Building opens and the third phase of the hospital's $45 million expansion is complete. The offices put physicians in closer proximity to their hospitalized patients.
- Also in 2003, St. Francis begins operating a state-of-the-art cardiac catheterization X-ray lab, which enables the hospital to offer minimally invasive procedures from a wide range of problems, including coronary artery disease.
- In 2004, the first Fellows program is launched by the St. Francis Foundation, enabling community leaders to learn about health care from a behind the scenes view at St. Francis.
- In 2004, St. Francis serves 89,000 inpatients, outpatients and emergency room patients.
- In the Spring of 2005, St. Francis dedicates The Carl and Frances Patrick Heart Institute of St. Francis, named in honor of the couple who gave more than $1.5m million toward cardiac care at St. Francis.
- In 2005, The Patrick Heart Institute performs 41,534 diagnostic tests, 856 stent procedures and 322 open heart surgeries.
- Also in 2005, The Bradley Center treats 1,260 inpatients & 568 outpatients; 556 children and adolescents are served, including 228 indignant children and youth who received crisis stabilization services.
- The St. Francis Orthopaedic Institute is established in the Fall of 2006. It serves in partnership between St. Francis Hospital and McCluskey Orthopaedic Surgery.
- In late 2006, the surgeons of Columbus Surgical Associates join with St. Francis to form the St. Francis Center for Surgical Care.
- The 2006 CHEERS employee giving campaign raises $110,087; cumulative CHEERS giving hits the $1 million mark.
- Also in 2006, The Center for Breast Health is renamed in memory of Elena Diaz-Verson Amos to honor the generosity of the Amos family. The estate of John and Elena Amos pledged $1 million toward breast health services and new technology at the center.
- In 2007, St. Francis and Columbus Regional Healthcare partner to consolidate behavioral health care services in one location at The Bradley Center.
- St. Francis becomes the area's first Primary Stroke Center in 2007, earning certification from The Joint Commission.
- In 2007, St. Francis is awarded the Josh Nahum Award for Achievement in Infection Prevention and Control for its "Coronary Artery Bypass Graft Surgery-Surgical Site Infection Prevention Project" by the Georgia Hospital Association. The project achieved a zero percent deep sternal wound infection rate at St. Francis.
- The St. Francis Center for Digestive Disorders opens in 2007.
- In 2008, St. Francis becomes Columbus' first Chest Pain Center, achieving accreditation by the Society of Chest Pain Centers.
- In 2008, St. Francis adds a Spine and Neurosurgery Center to the St. Francis Orthopaedic Institute.
- The Bradley Center opens a new Clinical Behavioral Health Unit in 2008 to serve geriatric and other patients who require medical treatment as well as psychiatric care.
- In August 2009, The Bradley Center expands its child/adolescent psychiatric services.
- The Trinity Center for Women opens in December 2009; the goal is to provide quality OB/GYN care for low income women and lower the area's rate of infant mortality.
- The Cardiac Rehabilitation program at St. Francis is certified by the American Association of Cardiovascular and Pulmonary rehabilitation.
- On March 31, 2010, St. Francis receives approval from the state of Georgia to expand and renovate its facility.

=== 2011 - 2012 ===
- In February 2012, Mercer University announced it will partner with St. Francis and The Medical Center, a hospital in the Columbus Regional Healthcare System, to create a medical campus in Columbus; starting in the summer of 2012, the hospitals will provide clinical rotations for up to 80 third and fourth year students from Mercer's School of Medicine. The partnership will create Mercer's third medical school campus joining existing campuses in Macon and Savannah.
