= WMUM-FM =

- Cochran, Georgia; United States
- Broadcast area: Macon area
- Frequency: 89.7 MHz (HD Radio)
- Branding: Georgia Public Radio

Programming
- Format: Public radio
- Subchannels: HD2: Classical "GPB Classical"
- Affiliations: NPR

Ownership
- Owner: Georgia Public Telecommunications Commission

History
- First air date: 1983 (as WDCO-FM)
- Former call signs: WDCO-FM (1983–2006)
- Call sign meaning: Mercer University Macon

Technical information
- Licensing authority: FCC
- Facility ID: 23939
- Class: C0
- ERP: 43,000 watts horizontal 100,000 watts vertical
- HAAT: 304.1 meters (997.7 feet)
- Transmitter coordinates: 32°28′11.6″N 83°15′16.6″W

Links
- Public license information: Public file; LMS
- Webcast: Stream
- Website: www.gpb.org/radio/stations/wmum

WMUM-FM (89.7 FM) (formerly WDCO-FM) is the Georgia Public Broadcasting (GPB) Public radio station serving Macon and central Georgia. The station shares a tower with its sister GPB Public Broadcasting Service (PBS) member television station, WMUM-TV, in Cochran, its city of license.

The station is a partnership, established in 2006, between Mercer University and GPB. The station provides local content to central Georgia public radio listeners from its broadcast studio on Mercer's Macon campus. The studio, constructed in 2006, offers various media-related educational opportunities for Mercer students. The station's call letters were changed to WMUM-FM (Mercer University Macon) to identify the current partnership with Mercer.

The station, under its former call letters, WDCO-FM, was one of the first GPB radio stations, signing on in 1984. As WDCO-FM, the station only simulcasted the GPB radio network, with no local origination. The new broadcast studio airs local programming.
