= William D. Underwood =

American university president

Underwood speaks as Mercer University president at a groundbreaking ceremony in Macon, Georgia, in 2019.

William D. Underwood is the Chancellor of Mercer University and a professor at the Mercer University School of Law. He previously was the eighteenth President of Mercer University from 2006 to 2026. Before that, he was the interim President of Baylor University from 2005 to 2006.

== Biography ==
Underwood graduated from Oklahoma Baptist University and received a J.D. from the University of Illinois in 1985. He was an editor of the University of Illinois Law Review and a member of the Order of the Coif. He clerked for the Honorable Sam D. Johnson of the United States Court of Appeals for the Fifth Circuit. Underwood then joined the firm of Carrington, Coleman, Sloman and Blumenthal in Dallas, Texas. In 1990, he became a law professor at Baylor University. While a professor at the law school, he served as interim President of Baylor University from 2005 to 2006. In 2006, he was selected as the President of Mercer University, a position he held until 2026, when he stepped down to return to full time teaching at the Mercer University School of Law.

Underwood has been involved with the American Law Institute, the American Bar Foundation, the Texas Bar Foundation, the Atlanta Regional Consortium on Higher Education, the Tubman Museum, the Georgia Cancer Coalition, the Georgia Chamber of Commerce, the International Association of Baptist Colleges and Universities, the American Baptist Historical Society, and MidCountry Financial Corporation. Underwood is a Baptist.
