= Howard Newman =

American artist

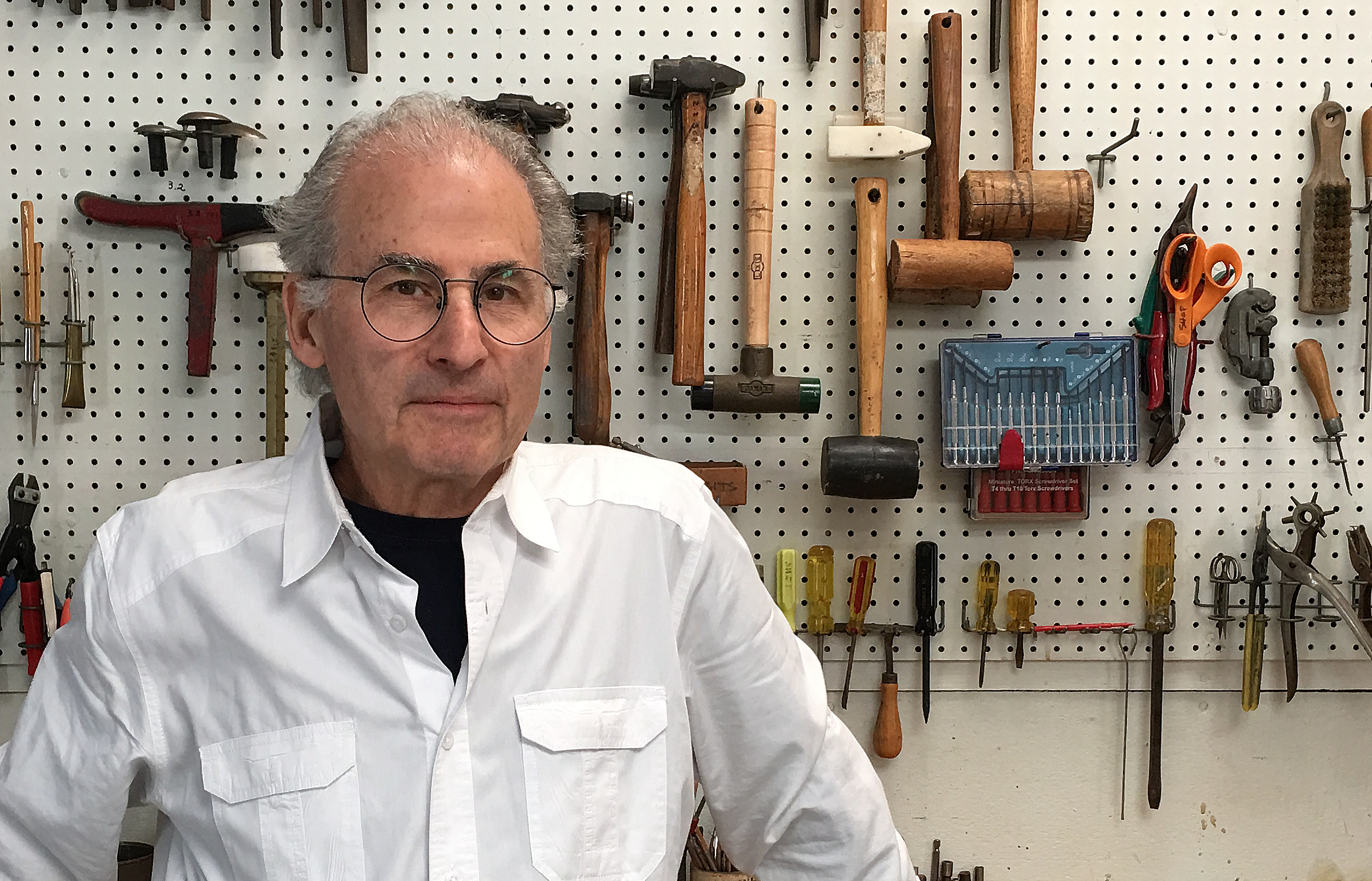
- Howard Newman in 2016
- Born: Elizabeth, New Jersey
- Known for: Fine art, art restoration, invention

Howard Newman is an American painter, sculptor, art restorer, and inventor.

== Biography ==
Howard Newman was born in Elizabeth, NJ, in 1943. He received a BA from Miami University of Ohio, where he studied architecture, Cultural Anthropology, Sociology and Classical Literature. After graduating from Miami University, Newman and his wife Mary entered Peace Corps training in a Special Forces training camp in Arecibo, Puerto Rico, where the two learned fluent Spanish and Survival Training. In 1967, Newman was accepted to the Rhode Island School of Design (RISD). In 1969 he received a BFA in Industrial Design and an MFA in Sculpture with a concentration in Silversmithing under the mentorship of master metalsmith John Prip.

Newman was awarded a Fulbright Scholarship to Italy in 1961; he and his wife Mary resided in Impruneta, south of Florence. There, Newman began making bronze sculptures. In 1973 and 1974, Newman and his wife gave birth to their children, Joshua A.C. Newman and Rachel Newman-Greene. Newman and his wife returned to Italy for another year between 1985 and 1986 and lived in Pietrasanta, north of Pisa, where he worked in La Fonderia Mariani, creating a series of bronzes, including two now on the grounds of the Newport Art Museum.

As of 2016, Newman continues to work at his private studio located in Newport, Rhode Island.

Howard's company maintains newmansltd.com, and its Youtube channel.

== Restoration ==
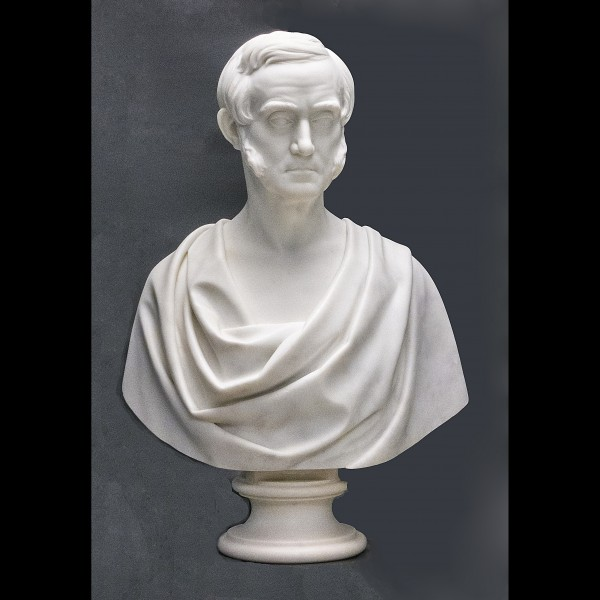
Restoration of a marble bust of Alexis Caswell

Currently, Newman and his staff restore a wide range of art objects made of mixed materials, including silver, gold, bronze, tin, iron and zinc. Newman spent a decade working on projects for the Preservation Society of Newport County. He exhibited some of those restorations at the Century Association in New York City in the year 2000. Newmans’ company is responsible for the restoration of Brown University's John Hay Library collection of marble busts.

Restoration is a bit like forensics, history and archaeology all together. You work backwards until you find where something changed or broke down to understand it.

— Howard Newman, "Built to Last"

== Restoration of "The Trinity" ==
In 2008, Newman and his company undertook the restoration of The Trinity Crucifix, the centerpiece of The Church of St. Gregory the Great on the campus of Portsmouth Abbey. The Trinity was crafted by American sculptor Richard Lippold in the 1960s, consisting of a 22,000-foot web of gold-plated brass wire. The wires radiate from the hands of the cross above the head, suspending the crucifix ten feet above the altar. The artisans from Newmans Ltd. carefully untangled the deteriorating wire, and restrung the five miles of wire into the original configuration, along with the restored crucifix.

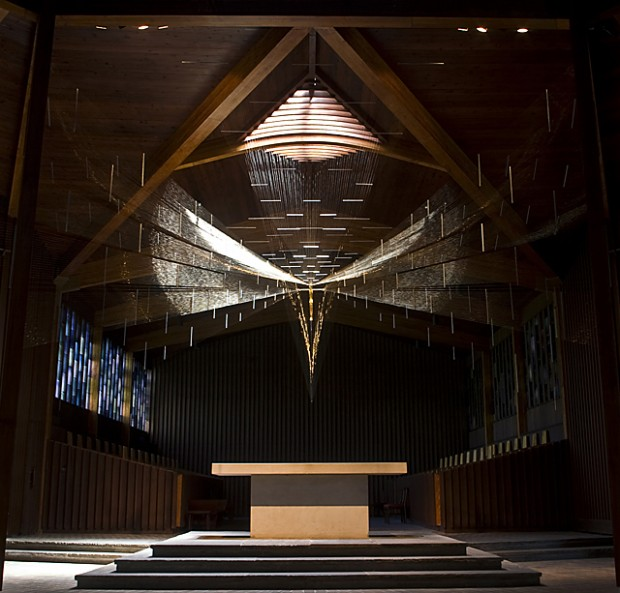
Portsmouth Abbey Crucifix

The restoration project received a 2009 Rhody Award for Historic Preservation by the Rhode Island Historical Preservation & Heritage Commission and 2009 Honor Award for Historic Preservation from the American Institute of Architects of Rhode Island.

== Inventions ==
In 2011, in partnership with Len Katzman, Howard Newman started Sigma Surfacing LLC, an intellectual properties venture. He presently holds several patents pending.

== Fine art ==
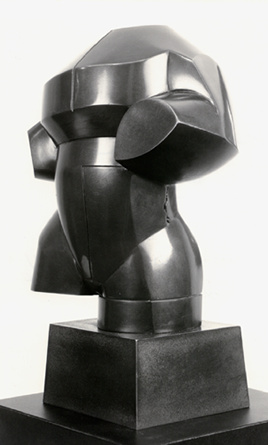
Torso #3 (Dancer), two views: Bronze with black patina and highlighted edges, height: 11", 1982

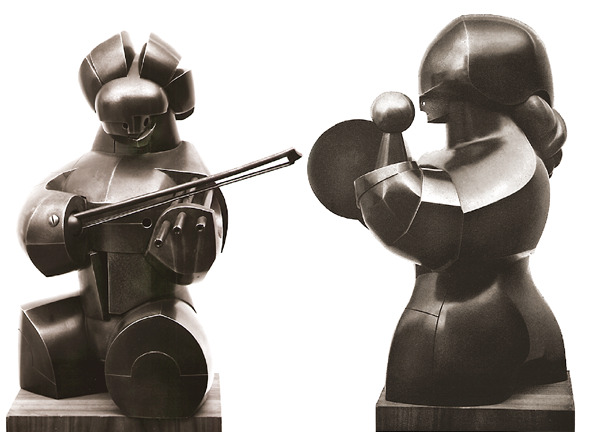
The Violinist and Drummer Girl: Bronze with black patina and highlighted edges, 21" and 24", 1981

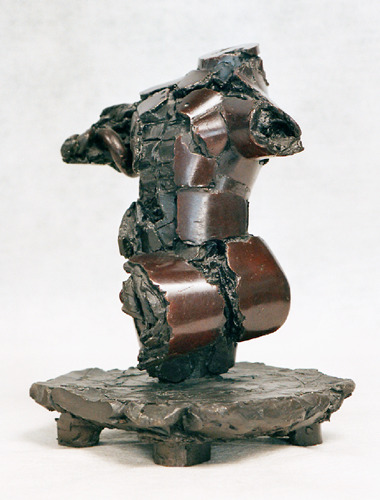
Avant Garde: Bronze with dark patina and acrylic washes, height: 14", 1986

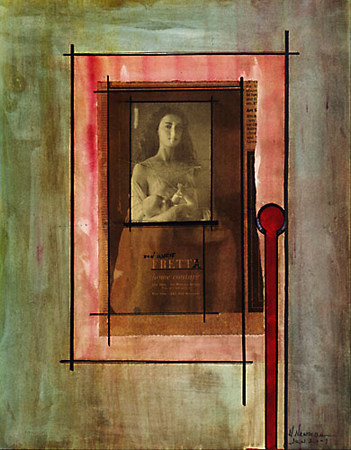
Mother and Child #1: Watercolor and ink on paper, 11" x 14", 2000–01

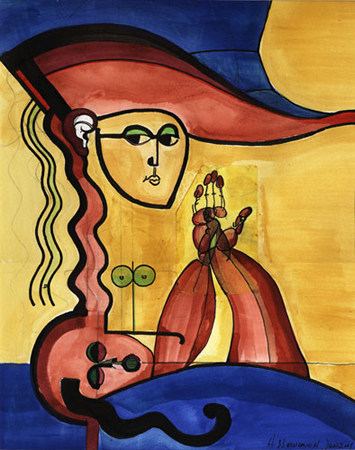
Mother and Child #5: Watercolor and ink on paper, 11" x 14"

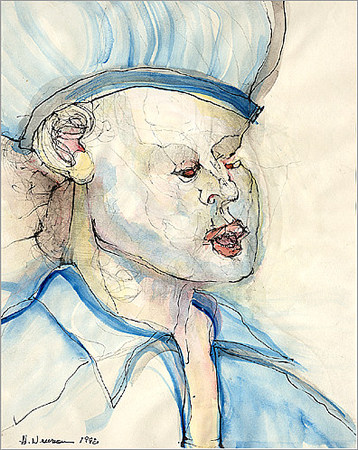
Poet #1: Watercolor and ink on paper, 11" x 14", 1998

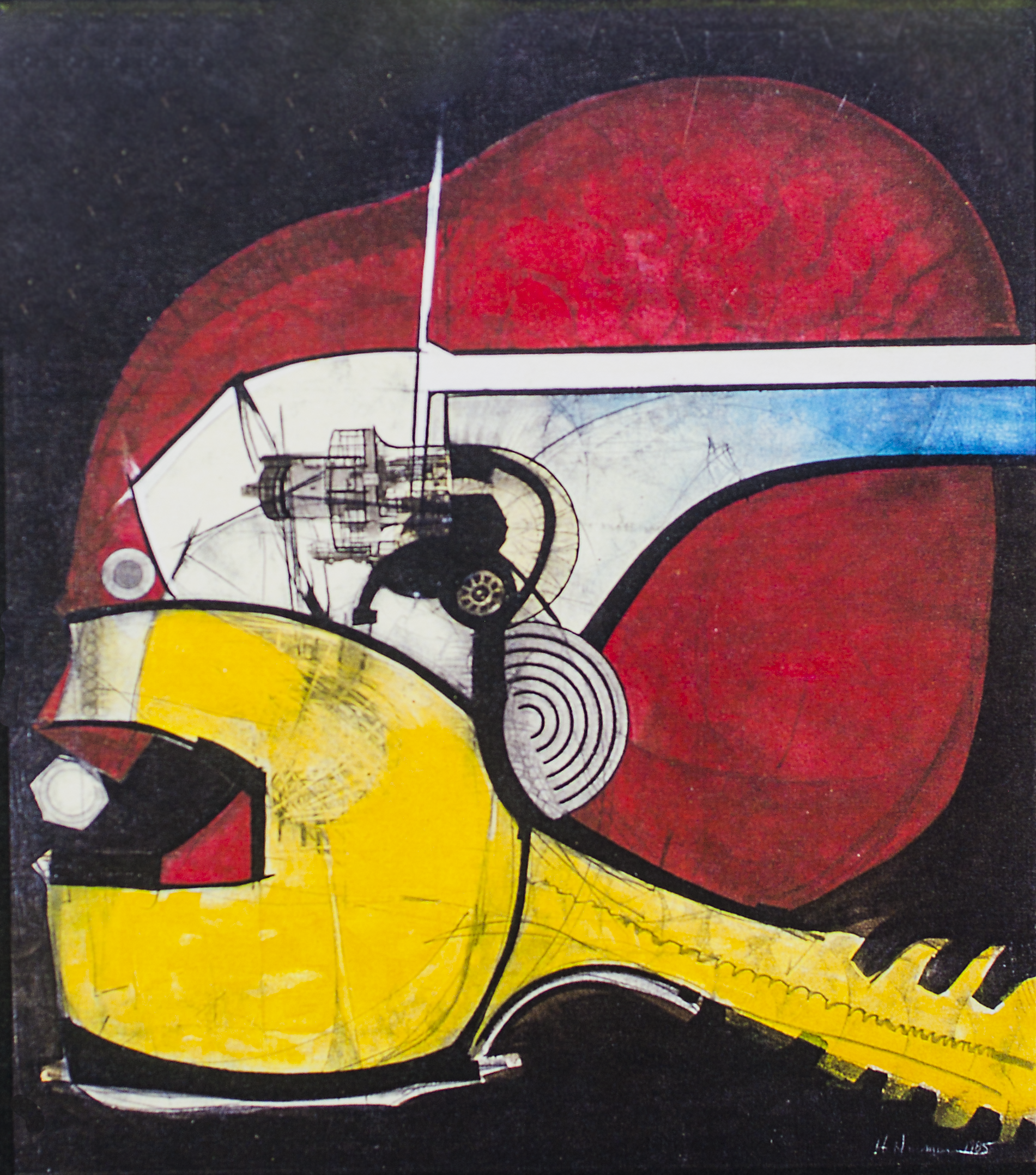
Machine Head: Mixed media on masonite, 36" x 42"

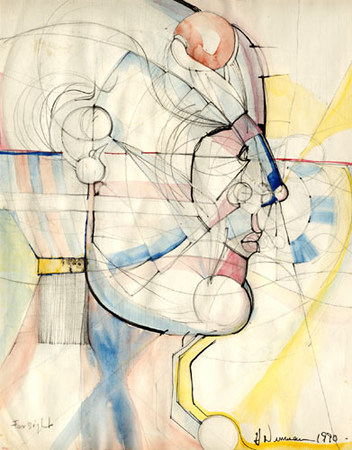
Farsight: Watercolor, charcoal and graphite, 11" x 14", 1990

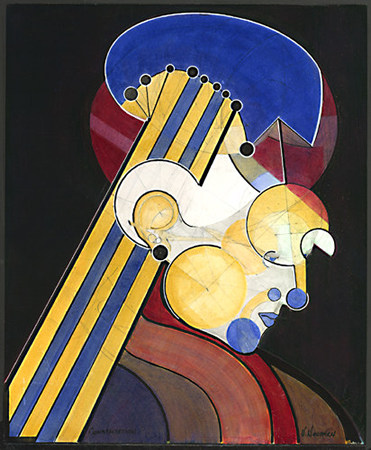
Constellation: Acrylic on paper and Masonite, 14" x 17", 2002

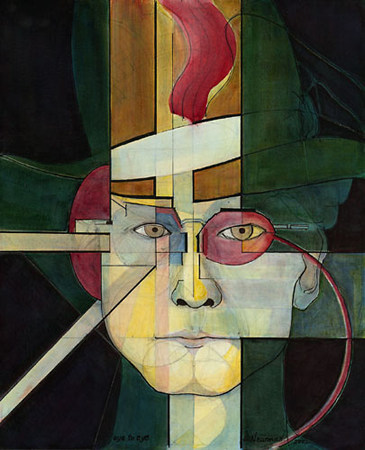
Eye To Eye: Acrylic on paper and Masonite, 14" x 17", 2002

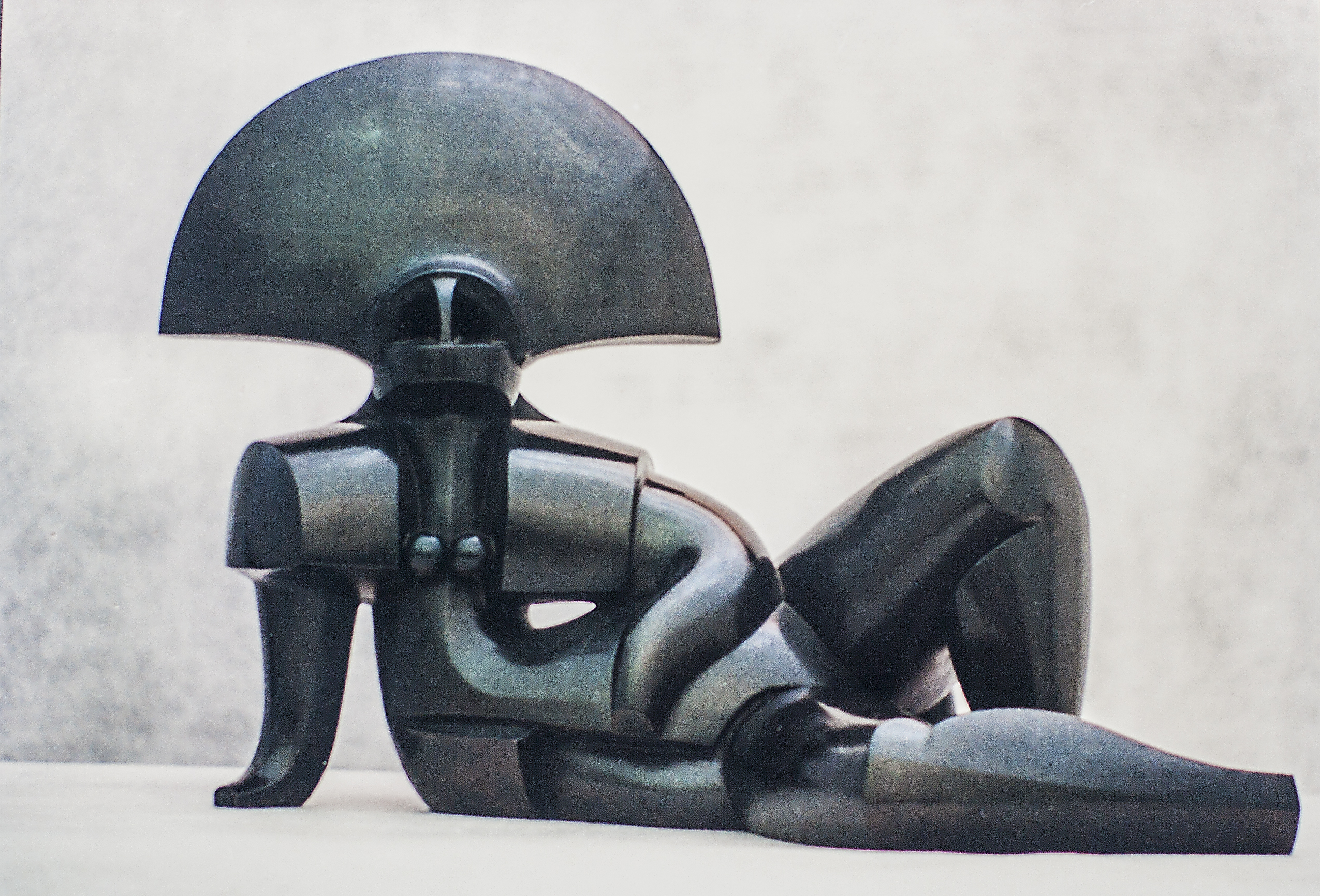
Giulia II: Bronze, length: 18", 1988 (original maquette, length: 12", 1977)

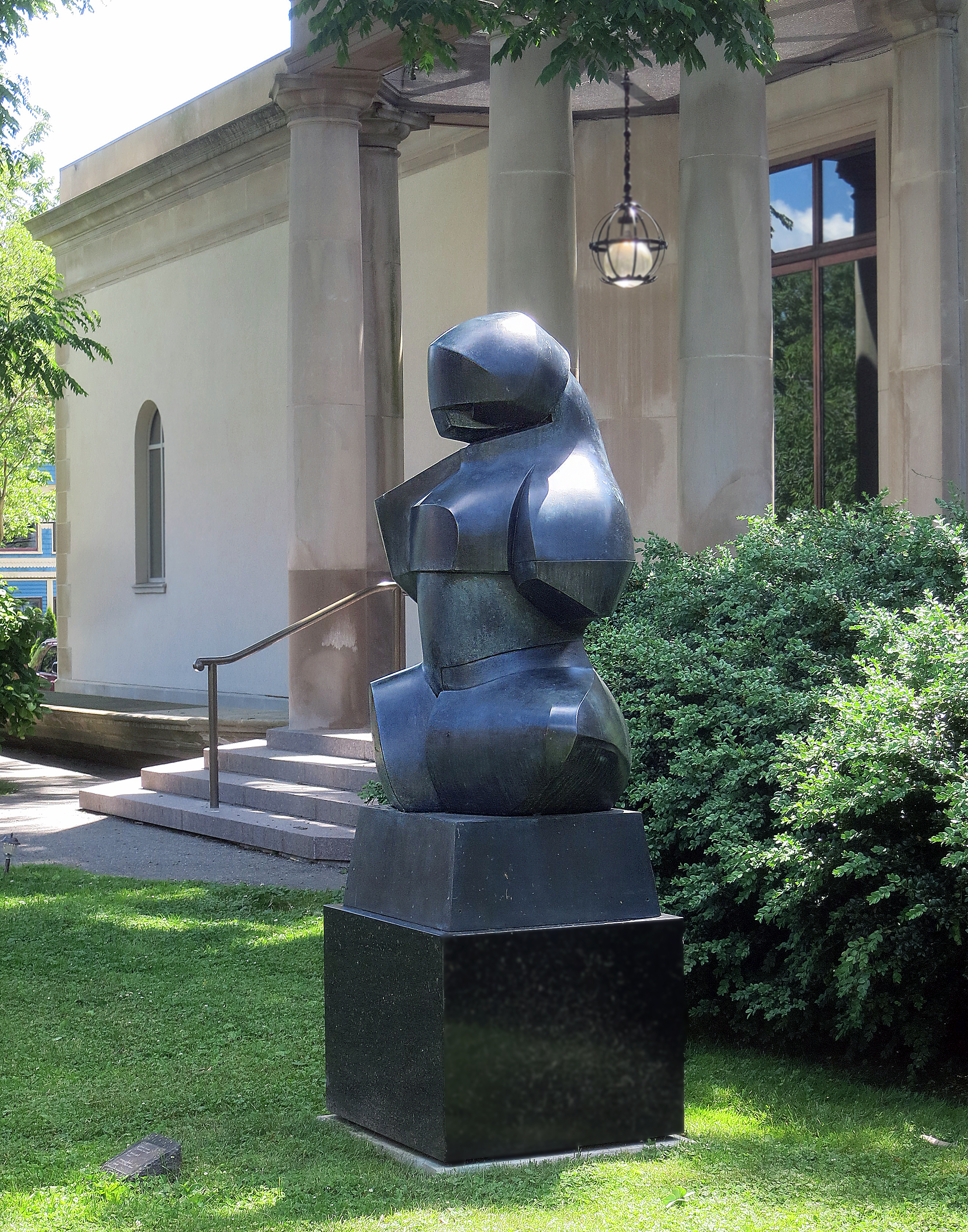
Torso #1: Bronze on bronze base with black granite base, 62", 1986, Newport Art Museum, Rhode Island

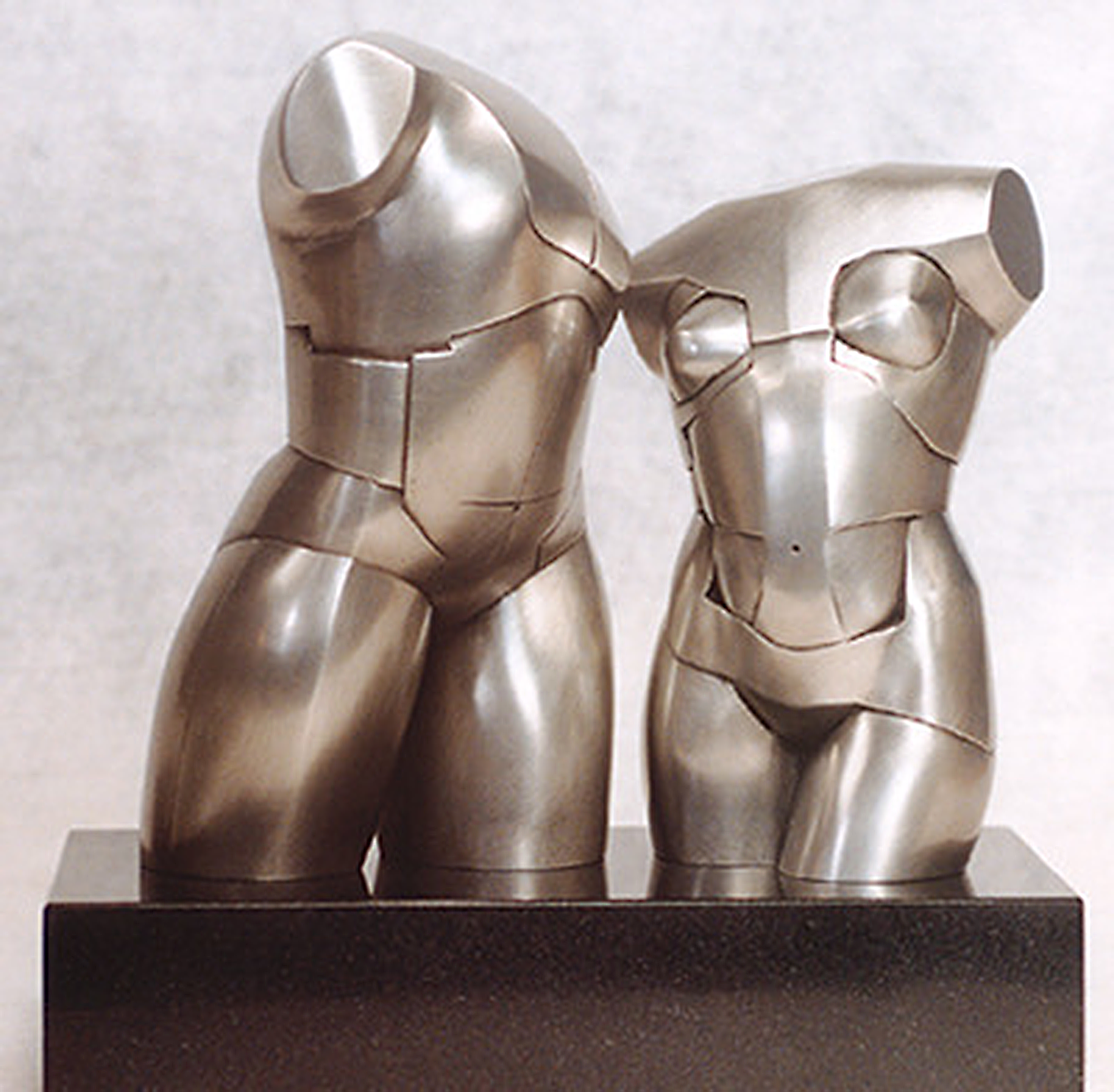
Partners: Torsos #4 & #5, cast pewter on black granite base,12.5" wide x 6" deep x 12" high, 2003

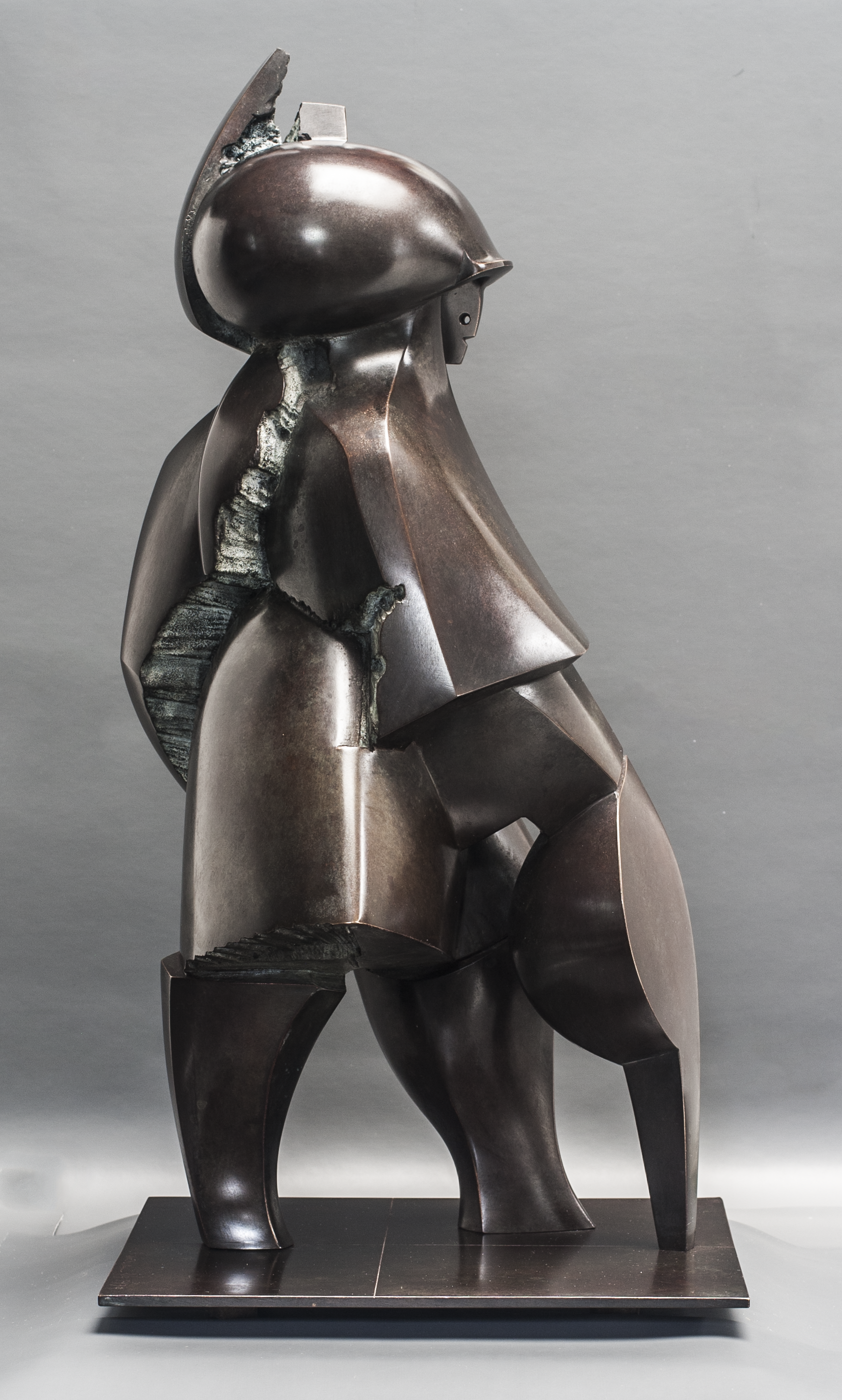
Winter II: Bronze with dark patina and highlighted edges, height: 23", 1990

== Restorations ==
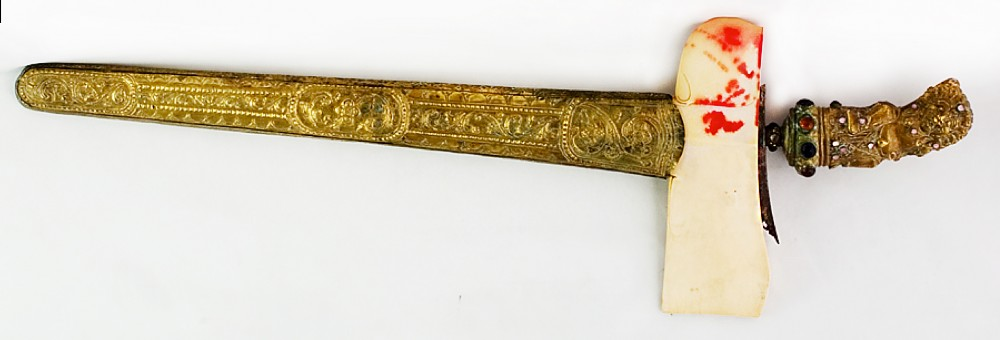
Balinese Sword, Ivory, brass, forged steel, semi-precious stones, wood.

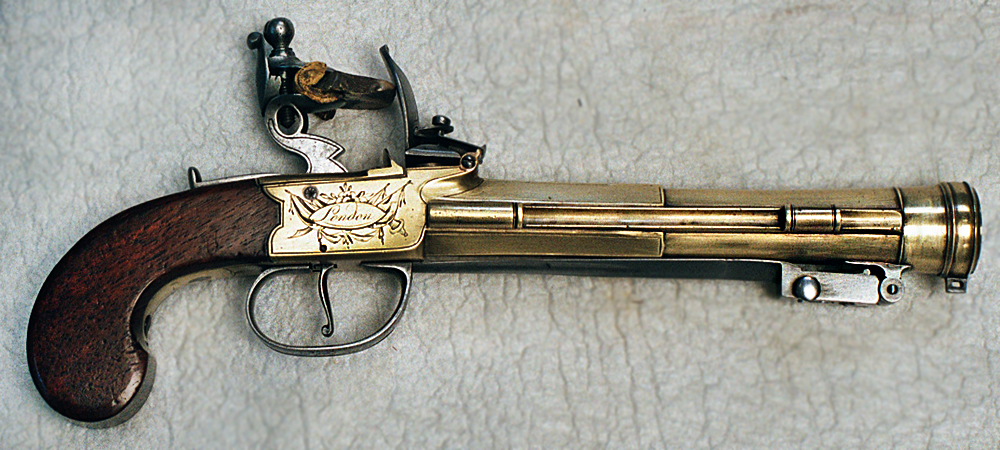
English Flintlock pistol "Spencer" Steel, brass, and wood, The McBean Collection, Preservation Society of Newport County

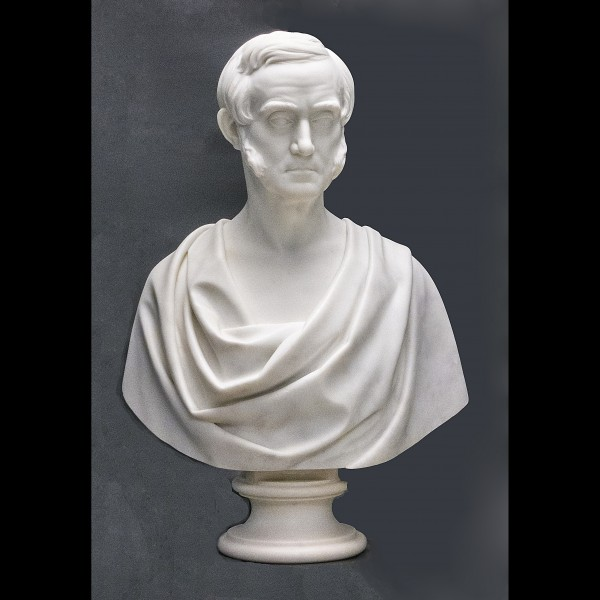
Marble bust of Alexis Caswell, John Hay Library, Brown University

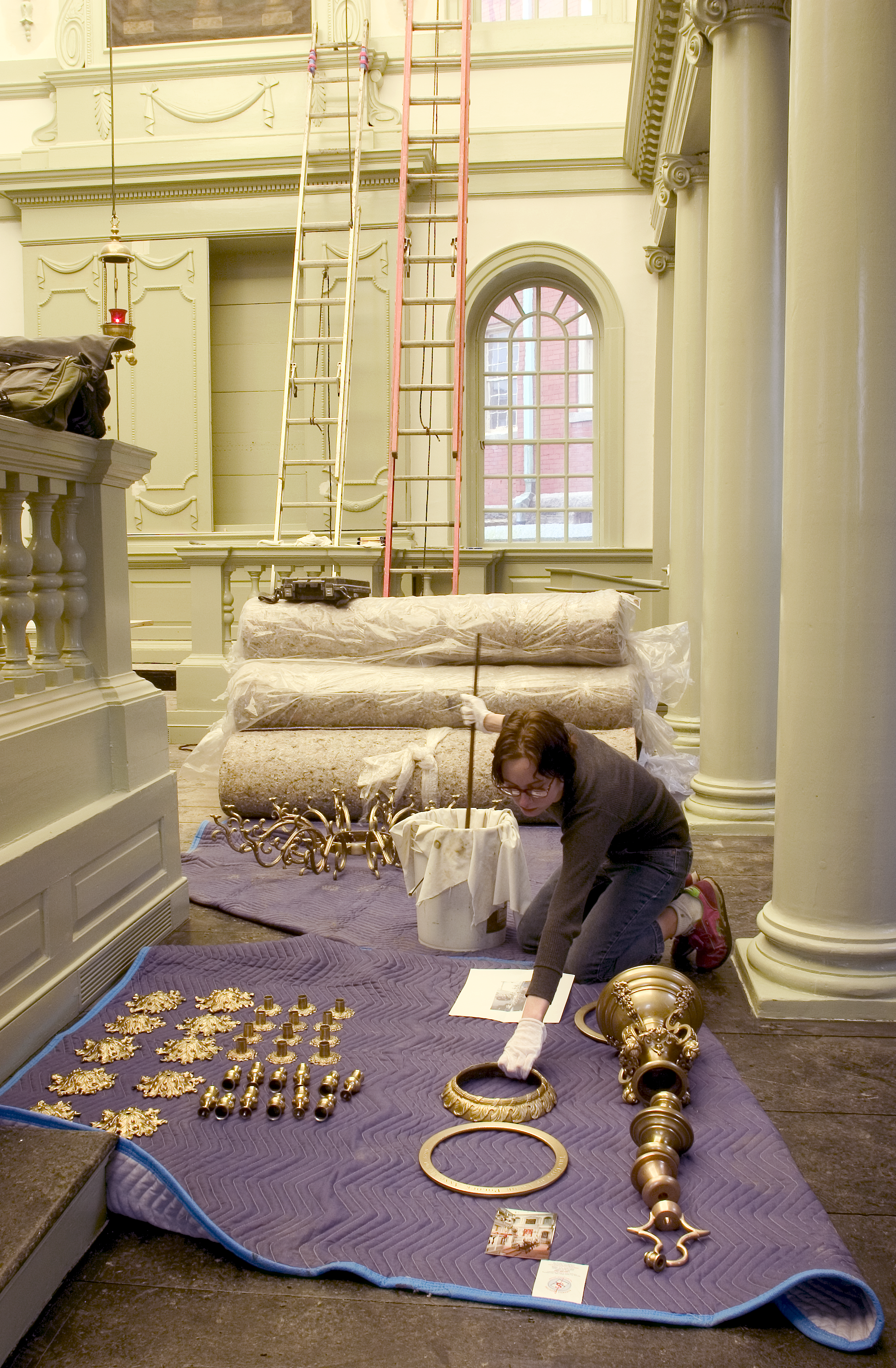
Touro Synagogue, Newport, Rhode Island

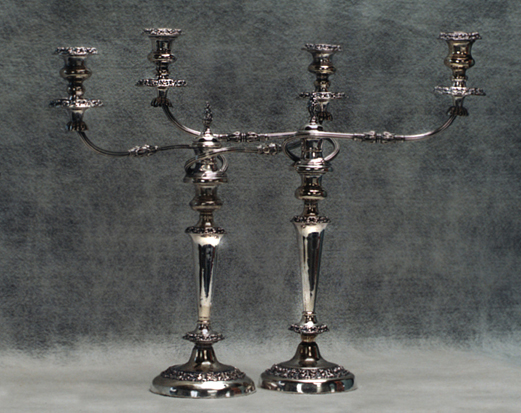
Candelabra, English, 19th century Silver, copper, steel and pitch

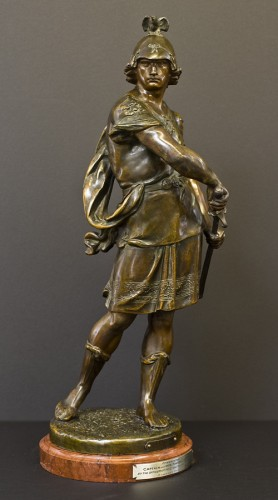
Bellum by Emile Louis Picault (French 1833–1915) Cast pewter, patinated copper plate

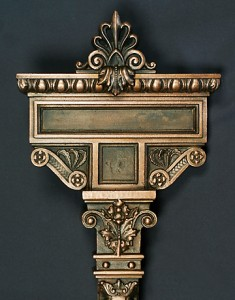
Decorative Column from Pequot Library, Southport, Connecticut

== Inventions ==
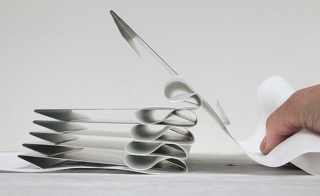
Envelope System for Emergency and other Structures

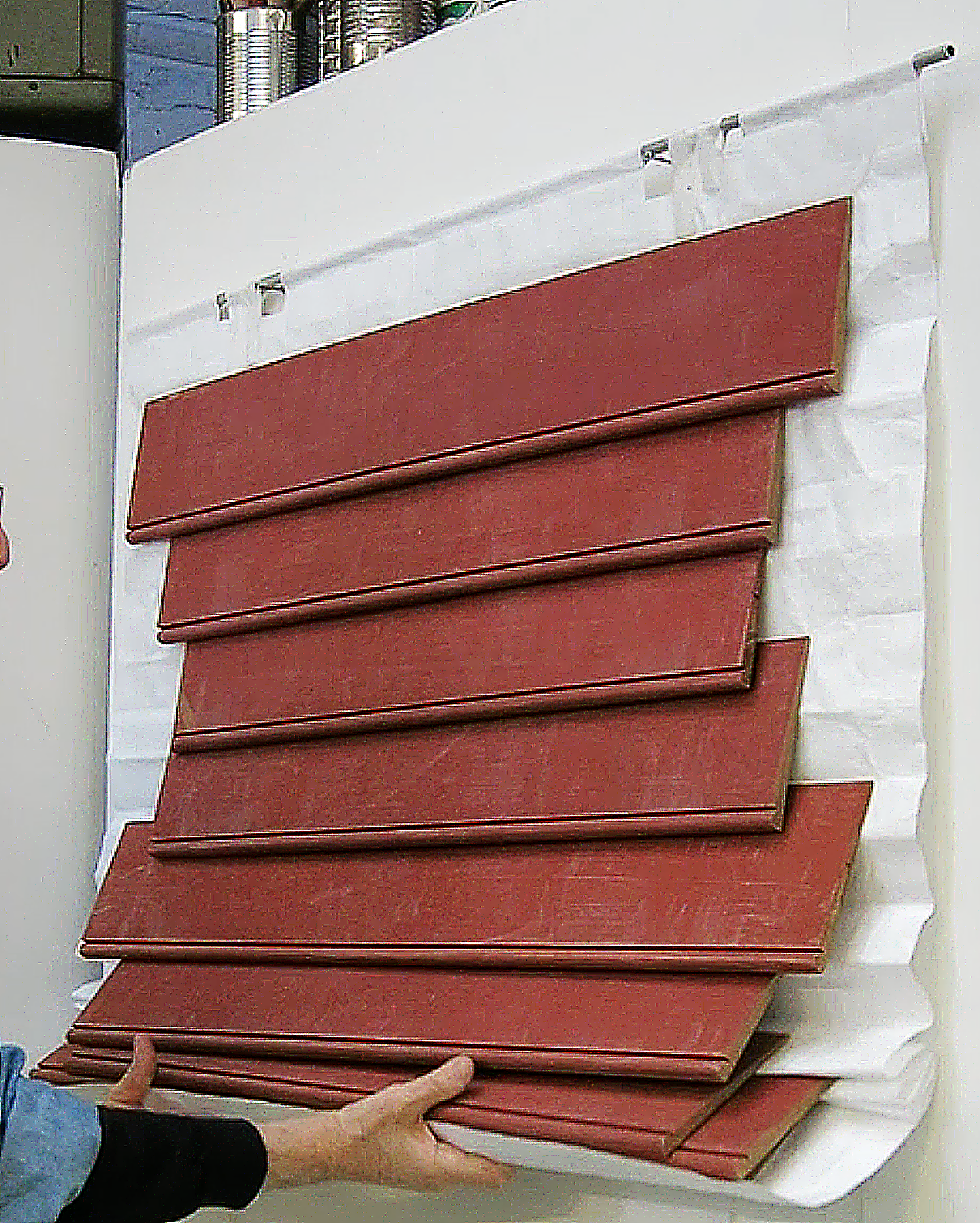
Envelope System for Emergency and other Structures; Clapboards

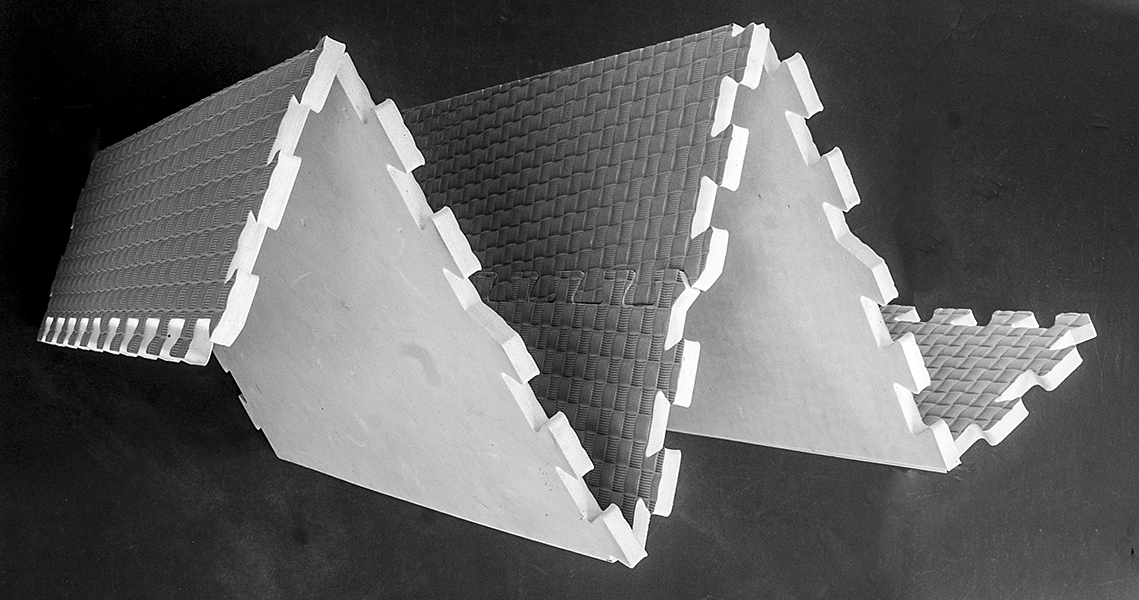
Interlocking Tile System; Folding Mat

== Awards ==
- Fulbright Scholarship, 1961
- Louis Comfort Tiffany Foundation Fellowship, 1978
- American Academy of Arts and Letters Award, 1980
- American Academy in Rome Rome Prize, 1980
- AIA Connecticut Design Award Preservation Honor, 2013
