= Shock: Social Science Fiction =

Tabletop role-playing game

Shock:Social Science Fiction
- Cover
- Designers: Joshua A.C. Newman
- Publishers: the glyphpress
- Publication: 2006
- Genres: Science fiction
- Systems: Custom

Shock: Social Science Fiction is a pen-and-paper indie RPG about the effects of the shock of cultural change on the individuals who make up that culture. The title is a reference to Alvin Toffler's Future Shock, the concept that rapid culture changes leave the members of the culture increasingly challenged by adaptation. The game is designed to be used by players to make "what if" science fiction, rather than science-flavored fantasy adventure. It was first published in 2006 and has since been through two point version updates.

== Editions ==
- 1st Edition (Version 1.0) was published in 2006.
- 2nd Edition (Version 1.1) was published in 2007, fixing some typos in the text and adding some clarifications to improve playability.
- 3rd Edition (Version 1.2) was published in 2009 again fixing some typos and adding an outline of the process of setup and play.
- 4th Edition (Version 1.3) was published in 2010 as the Italian translation by Janus Editions, modifying some of the mechanical metaphors for clarification, though none of the mechanics themselves.

== Linguistic Peculiarities ==
The game text makes use of the gender neutral pronoun zie/hir to allow the player to experience some of the same culture shock that the characters in the game will live through. When the rules refer generically to a Protagonist or Antagonist the text uses *Tagonist as a generic alternative (borrowing the unix-style wildcard character *).

== Mechanics ==
Shock: does not require advance preparation by a moderator or game facilitator. The game has no traditional Game Master role: each player creates a Protagonist (that will be her/his character) and gives the player to his/her left a guideline about the kind of Antagonist they will face. That player then fleshes out the Antagonists sheet.

Play goes around the table with each Protagonist playing out a scene until the Antagonist places them in a conflict situation. Then the conflict is resolved, the scene ends, and play continues with a new scene with the next player's Protagonist.

The game originated a system of counterstakes, called "intents" that raises the possibility of every player getting what they asked for, a process with deliberately ironic results.
