= Pequot Library =

Association library in Southport, Connecticut

Coordinates: 41.1336°N 73.2896°W

Pequot Library Association
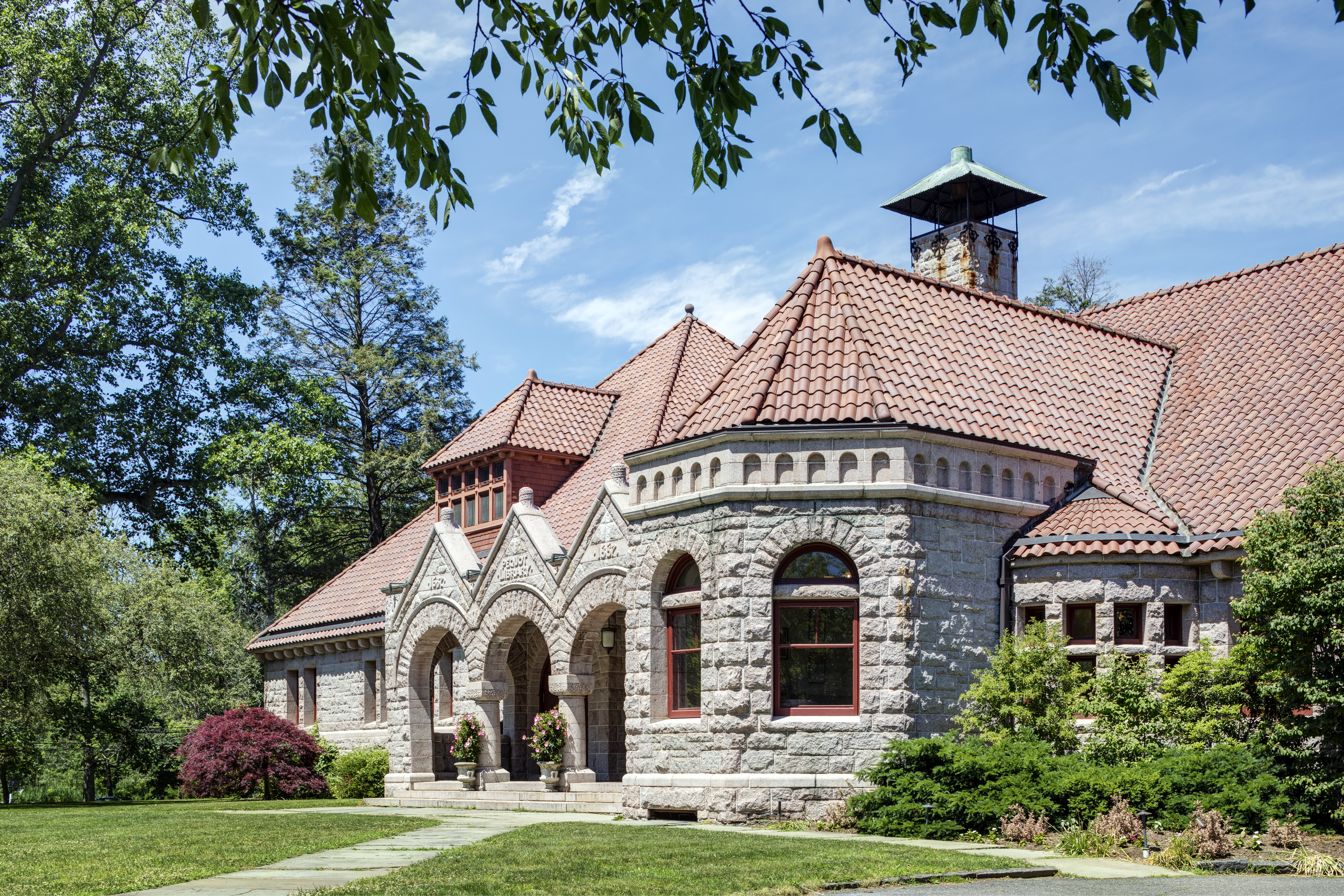
- Established: 1889
- Location: Southport, Connecticut, United States
- Type: American literature americana shakespeare
- Founder: Virginia Marquand Monroe
- Website: www.pequotlibrary.org

- Pequot Library Association
- U.S. National Register of Historic Places
- U.S. Historic district – Contributing property
- Location: Southport, Connecticut, United States of America
- Built: 1894
- Architect: R.H. Robertson
- Architectural style: Romanesque Revival
- NRHP reference No.: 71000898
- Added to NRHP: 1970

The Pequot Library is a public association and special collections library in Southport, Connecticut. It was founded in 1887, and opened in 1894 with financial and organizational support from the Marquand Family. The library is known for its robust special collections, including William Shakespeare's First Folio, John James Audubon's Birds of America, and William Morris' work with the Kelmscott Press, as well as the first cookbook ever printed, De honesta voluptate et valetudine. The Library also has a vast circulating collection of over 105,000 books and other materials.

The building, constructed in 1894 by Robert Henderson Roberston in the Romanesque Revival style, is a Contributing Property to the Southport Historic District, and is listed on the National Register of Historic Places. It contains numerous architectural marvels, including a glass floored stacks wing, Tiffany glass windows, among other features.

The library takes its name from the Pequot group of 80 to 100 who had earlier fled their home territory in the Mystic area and taken refuge with approximately 200 Sasqua people who inhabited the area that is now Fairfield.

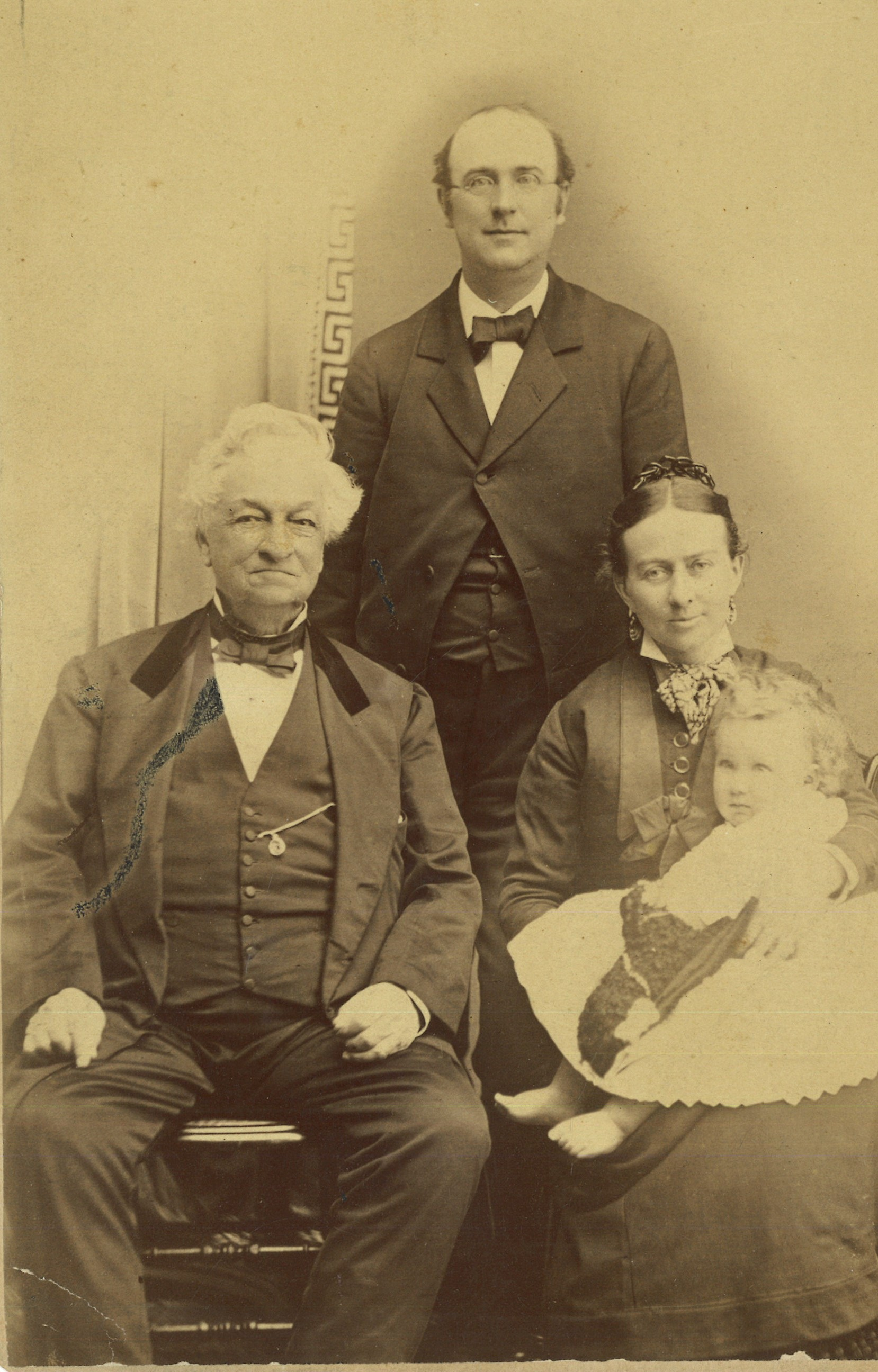
A period photograph of Pequot Library founder Virginia Marquand Monroe, Frederick Marquand, as well as husband Elbert and child.

== Founding ==
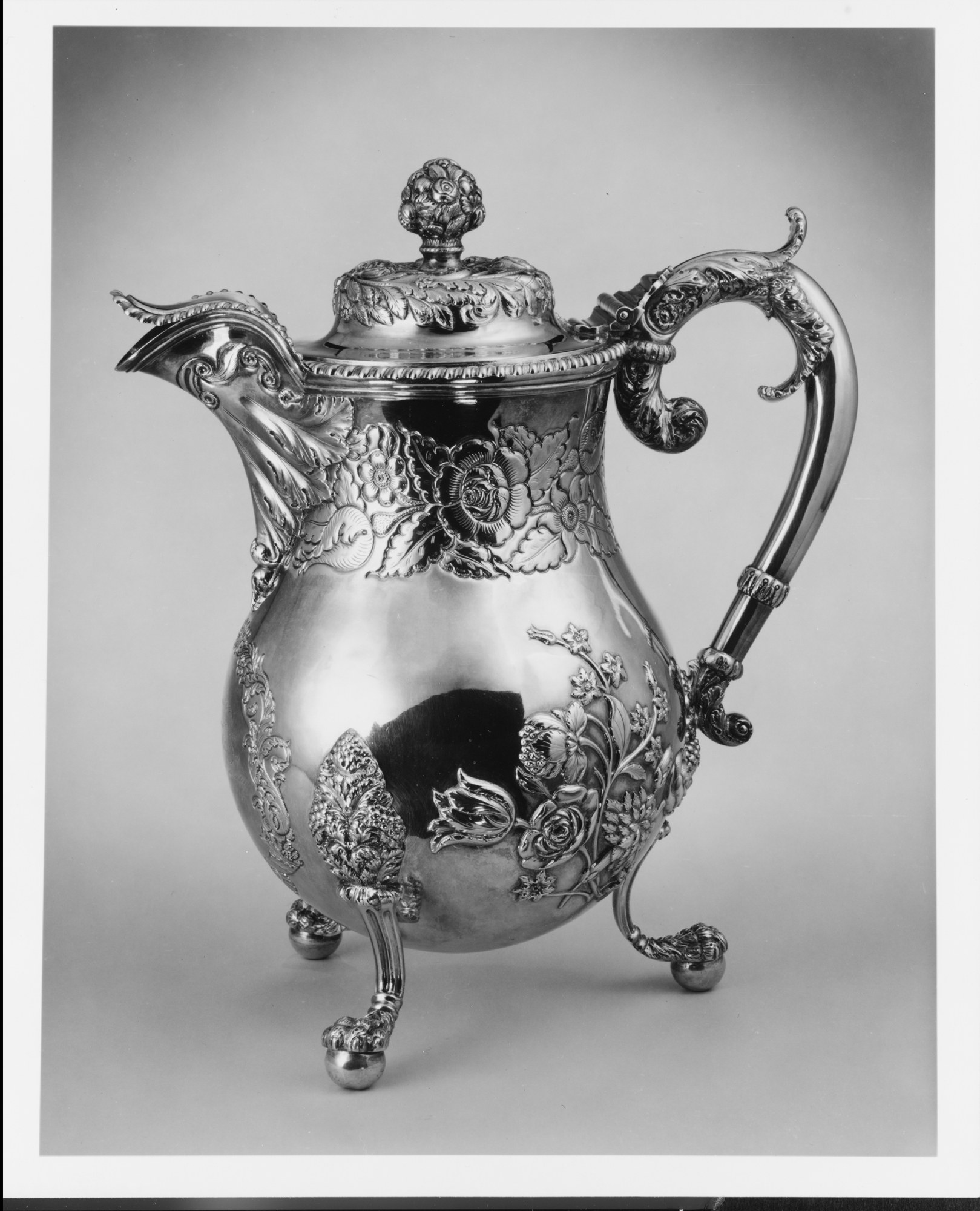
Covered Ewer by Frederick Marquand, 1827. It was presented to noted New York City surgeon Valentine Mott (Metropolitan Museum of Art)

The Pequot Library was founded by Virginia Marquand Monroe (of the Marquand and Co. family) and Elbert B. Monroe as a memorial to Virginia's uncle and adoptive father, Frederick Marquand. Frederick served as President of Marquand and Co., described by contemporaries as the "principle jewelers in America." During his years at the head of his family's firm, Frederick's brother, Henry Gurdon Marquand, served as his deputy. Henry went on to help found the Metropolitan Museum of Art, having served as its second president. Frederick, after serving at the President of Marquand and Company, sold the business in 1838 to former apprentices William Black and Henry Ball. The firm soon took the name Black, Ball, and Co. Frederick took the proceeds from the sale of his business, and invested it in New York City real estate, as well as other financial ventures. Both Frederick and his brother Henry grew very wealthy. With his earnings, Henry purchased a diverse array of Old Masters paintings, including Rembrandt's Portrait of a Man. Frederick lived for 50 years in a Greek Revival house on Pequot Avenue, which was razed in 1892 to reveal a new library building behind it. The library was in its early years a women-led institution, with female philanthropists shepherding the fledgling organization through its construction and special collections purchases.

Community libraries, in the form of book collections and associations of dues-paying members, were not uncommon. However, these groups only lasted until the members had read all the books. Through the generosity of donors and support from the Town of Fairfield, Pequot Library is able to offer its programming and resources "free as air to all" in the words of its founders, as an association library that is privately owned by the Pequot Library Association but functions as a public-serving library.

== Architecture ==
The Richardsonian Romanesque building that houses the library was designed by the architect Robert Henderson Robertson and is a contributing property to the National Register of Historic Places' Southport Historic District.

By the time Virginia Marquand Monroe was contemplating her library, the architect-client relationship was no longer so client-centered, and Robertson was the creative force behind the design, influenced by Henry Hobson Richardson. The library's pink granite exterior and red tile roof make a contrast with the surrounding clapboard architecture.

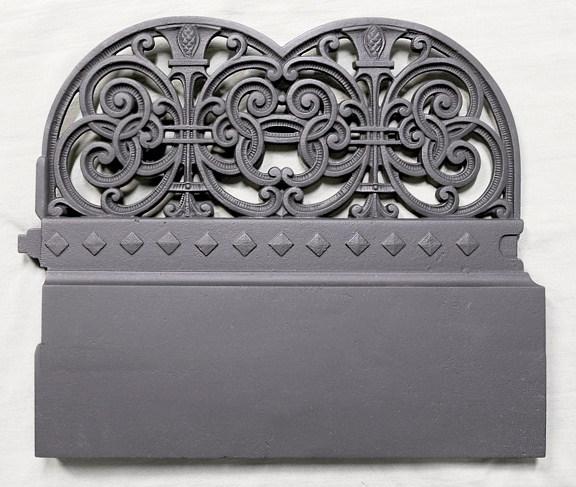
Pequot Library ironwork detail in the stacks; restoration done by Howard Newman

In 2006, the Pequot Library invested in a restoration project to address the condition of the elaborate metalwork set throughout their library stacks. Robert Robertson designed each shelf in the library to be supported by cast iron structures. Each row of shelving is framed by columns and the stairways linking the two stories are made with balusters of garlands and vines in copper-plated cast iron. During the course of restoration, over 6,000 metal pieces were individually treated. The project was carried out by Howard Newman's restoration company Newmans Ltd. The most recent restoration of the Library which occurred in 2020 and 2021, when the original signature terra cotta roof tiles from 1894 had replacements installed from the original manufacturer, Ludowici Roof Tile. The project included structural repairs and waterproofing the entire original structure and was funded to the amount of $1.6 million by the community and several grants.

== Building gallery ==
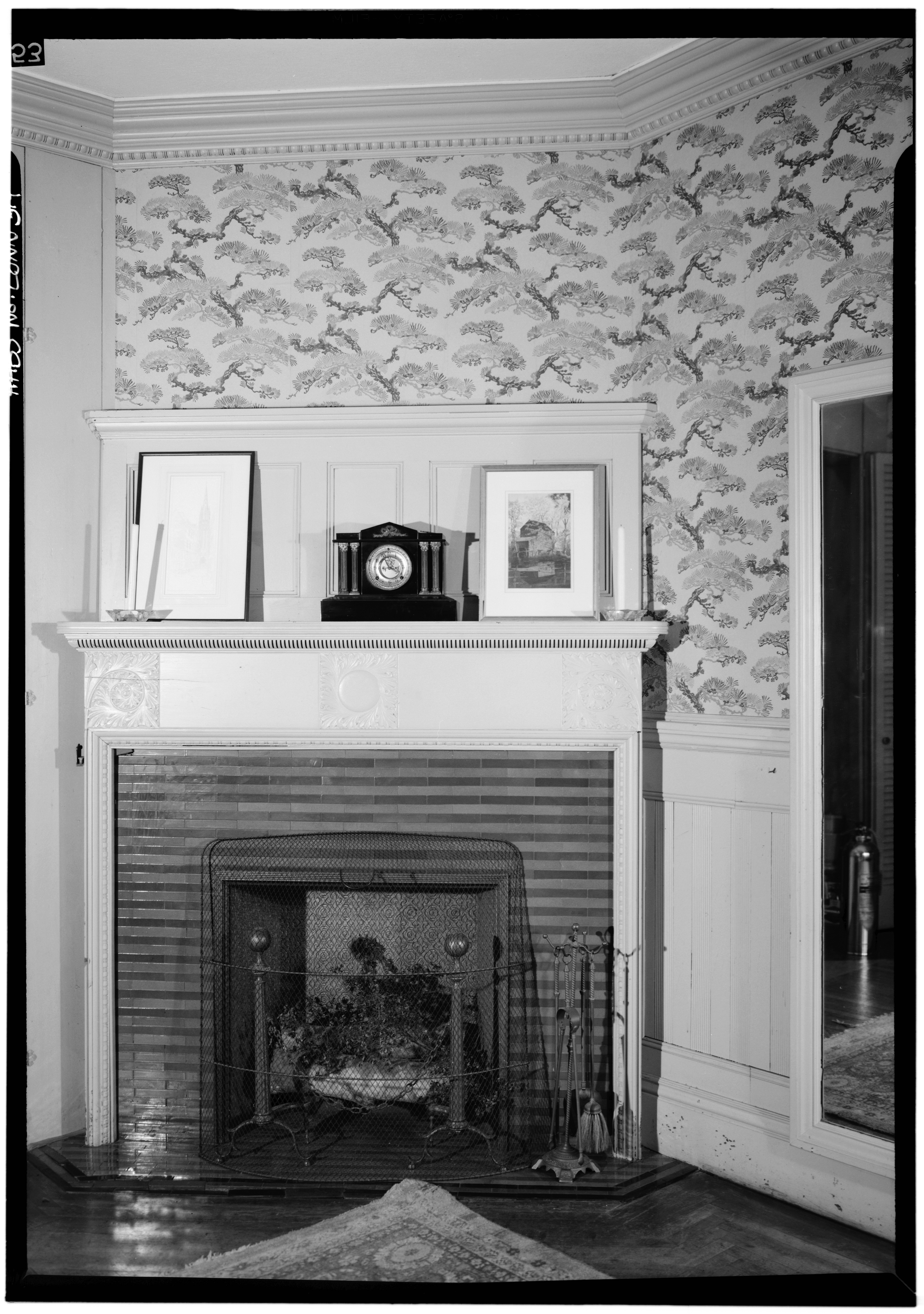
1966 detail of fireplace in director's room

Historic photograph of Pequot Library stacks

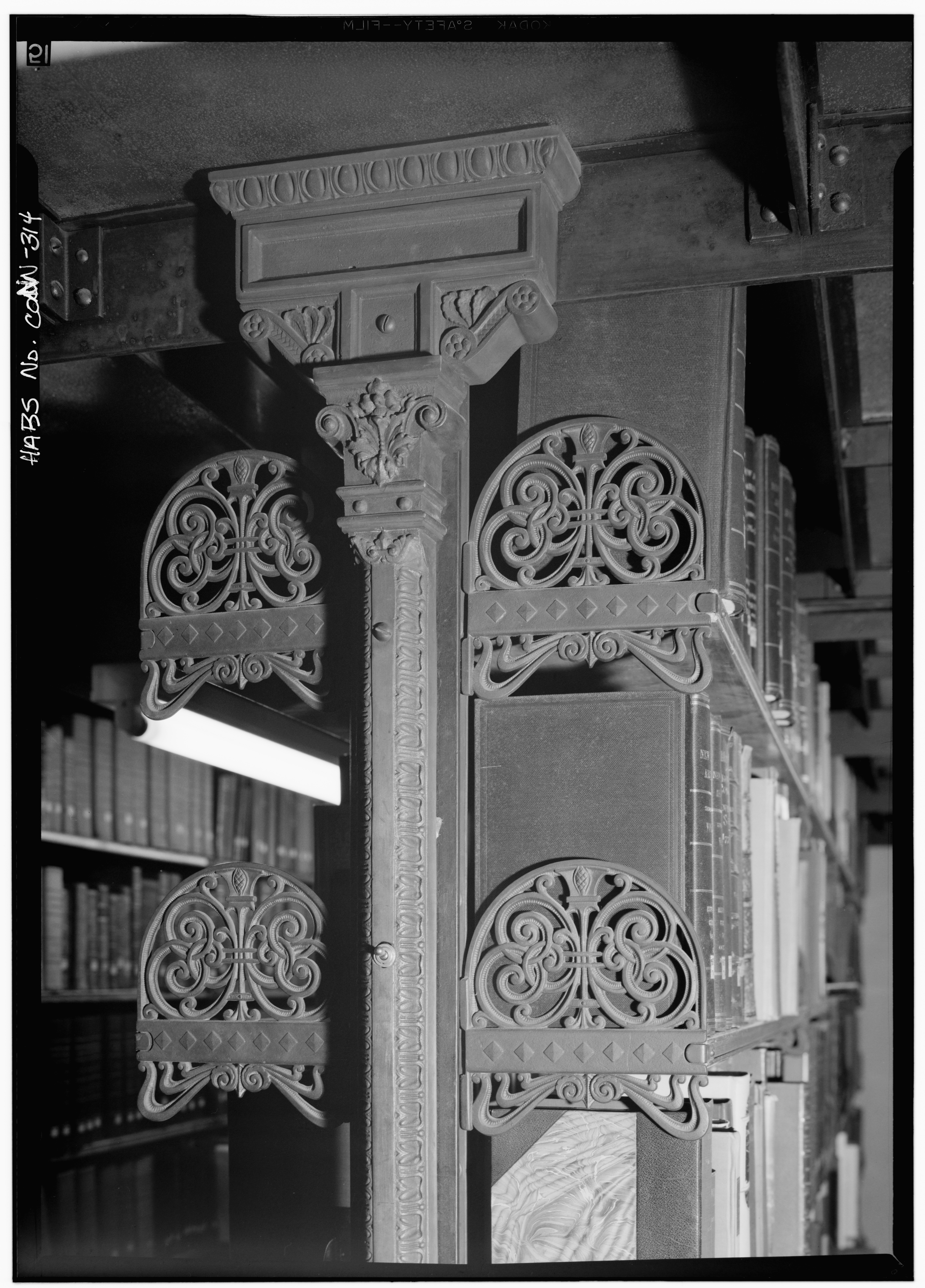
Detail of stack shelving

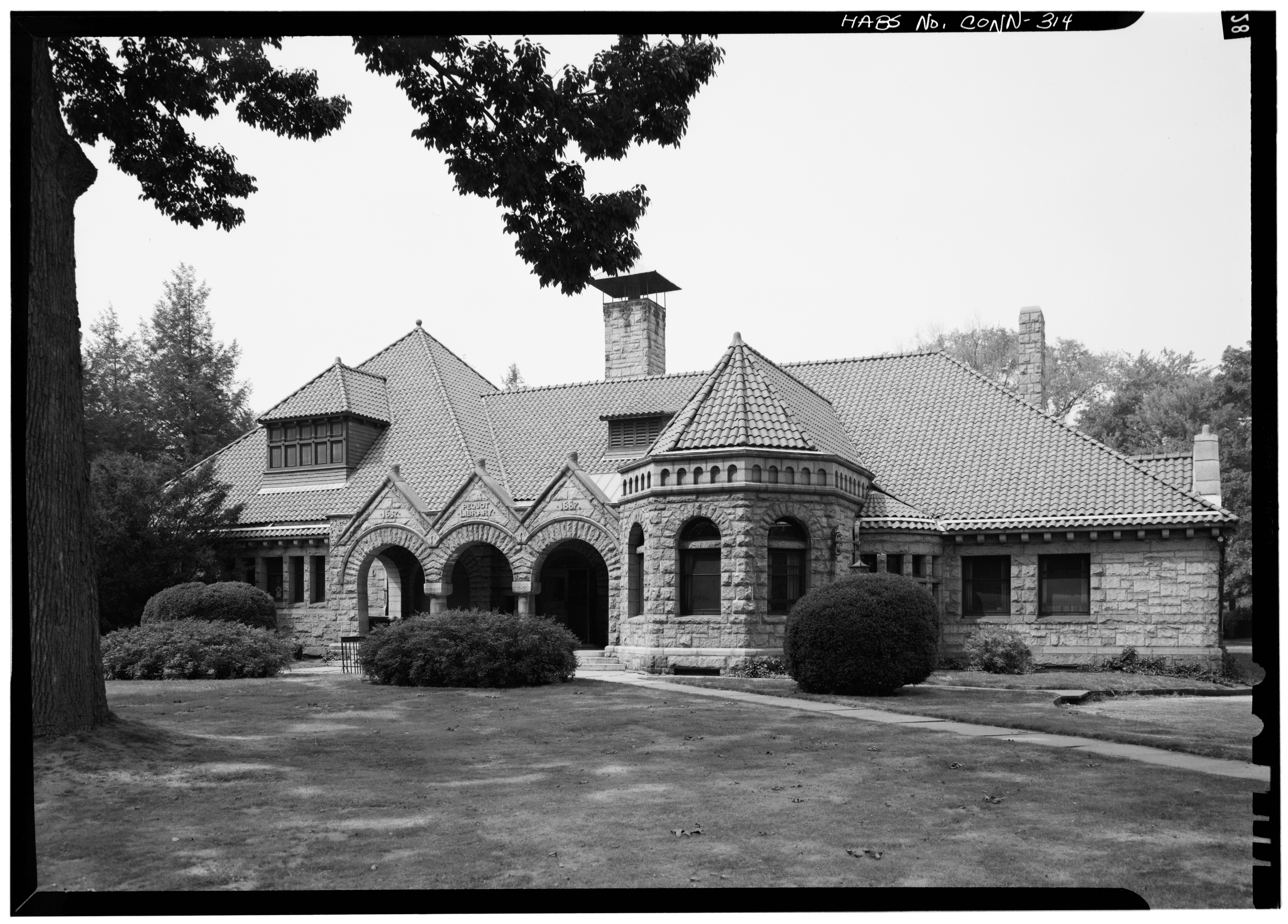
General view of front façade from the southeast

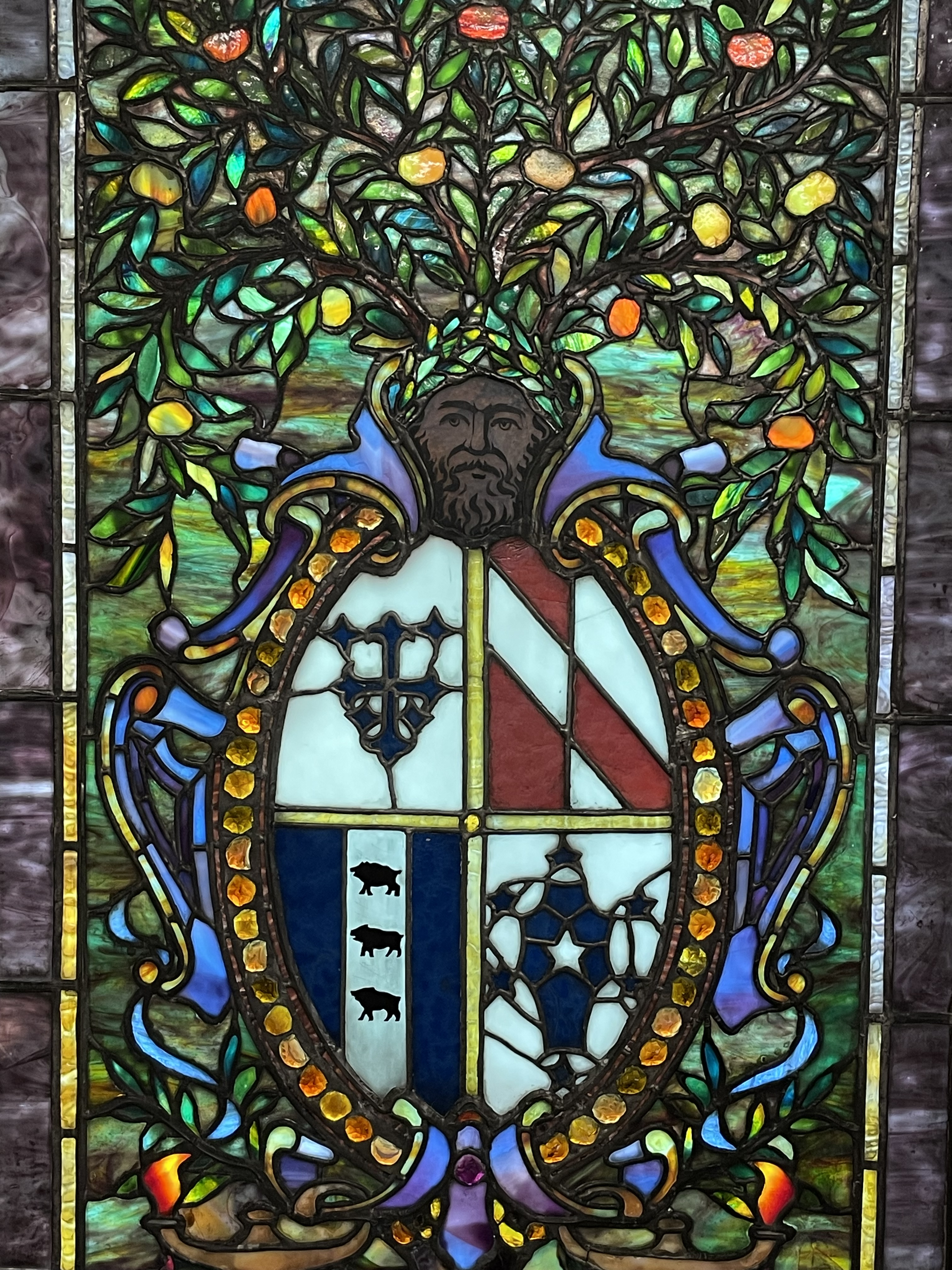
Pequot Library Tiffany glass

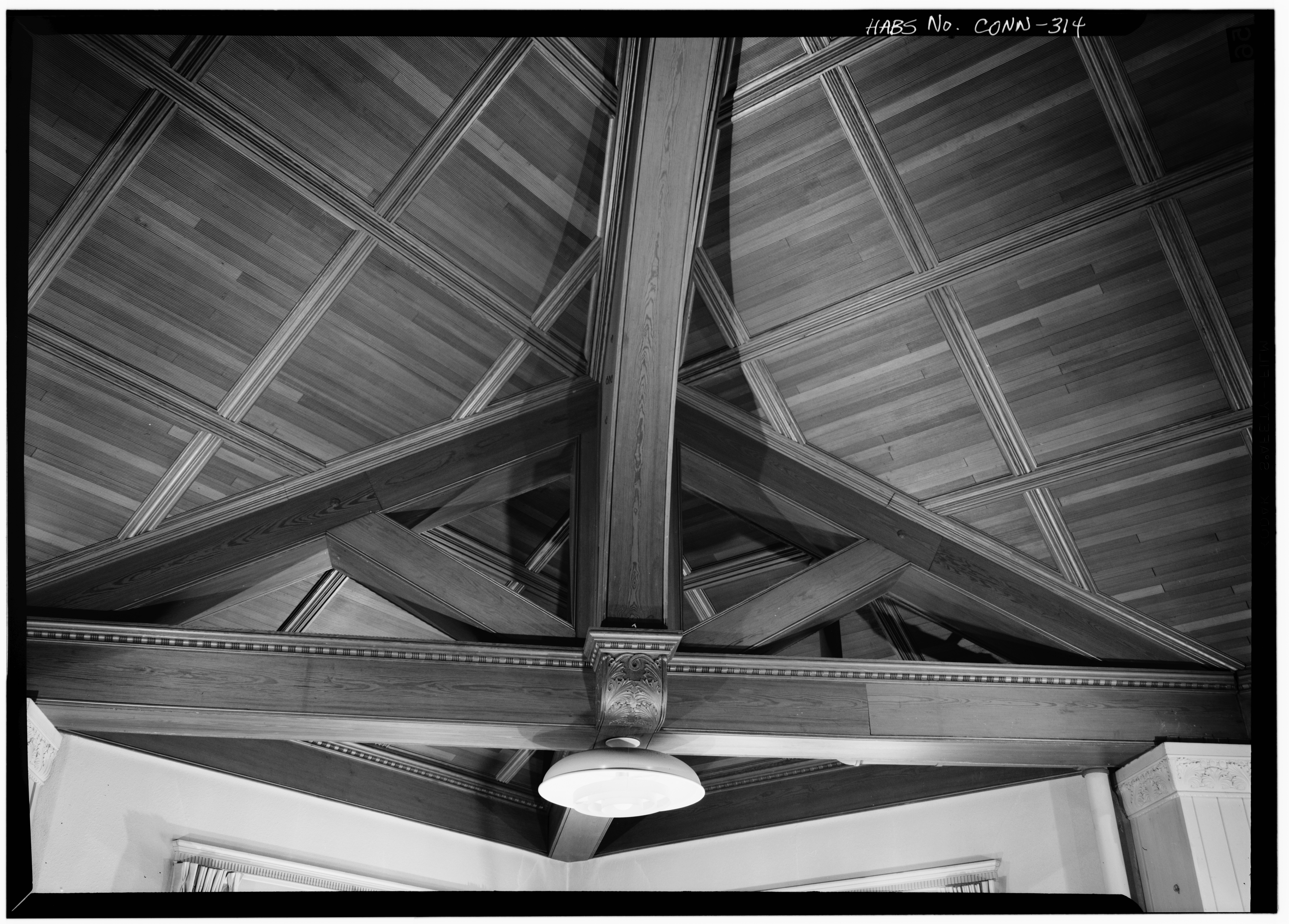
Detail of auditorium ceiling structural system

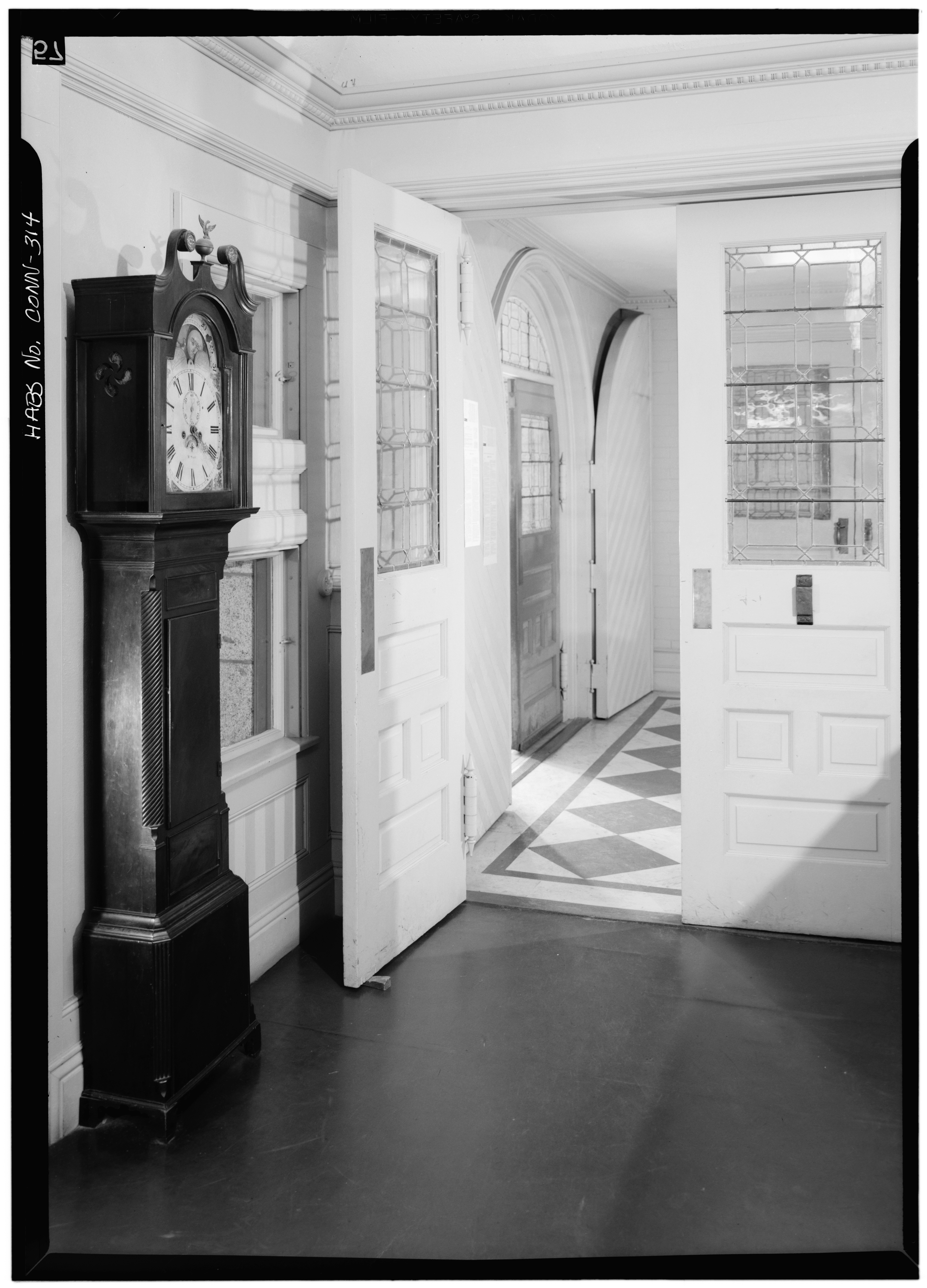
1966 detail of entry hall doorways

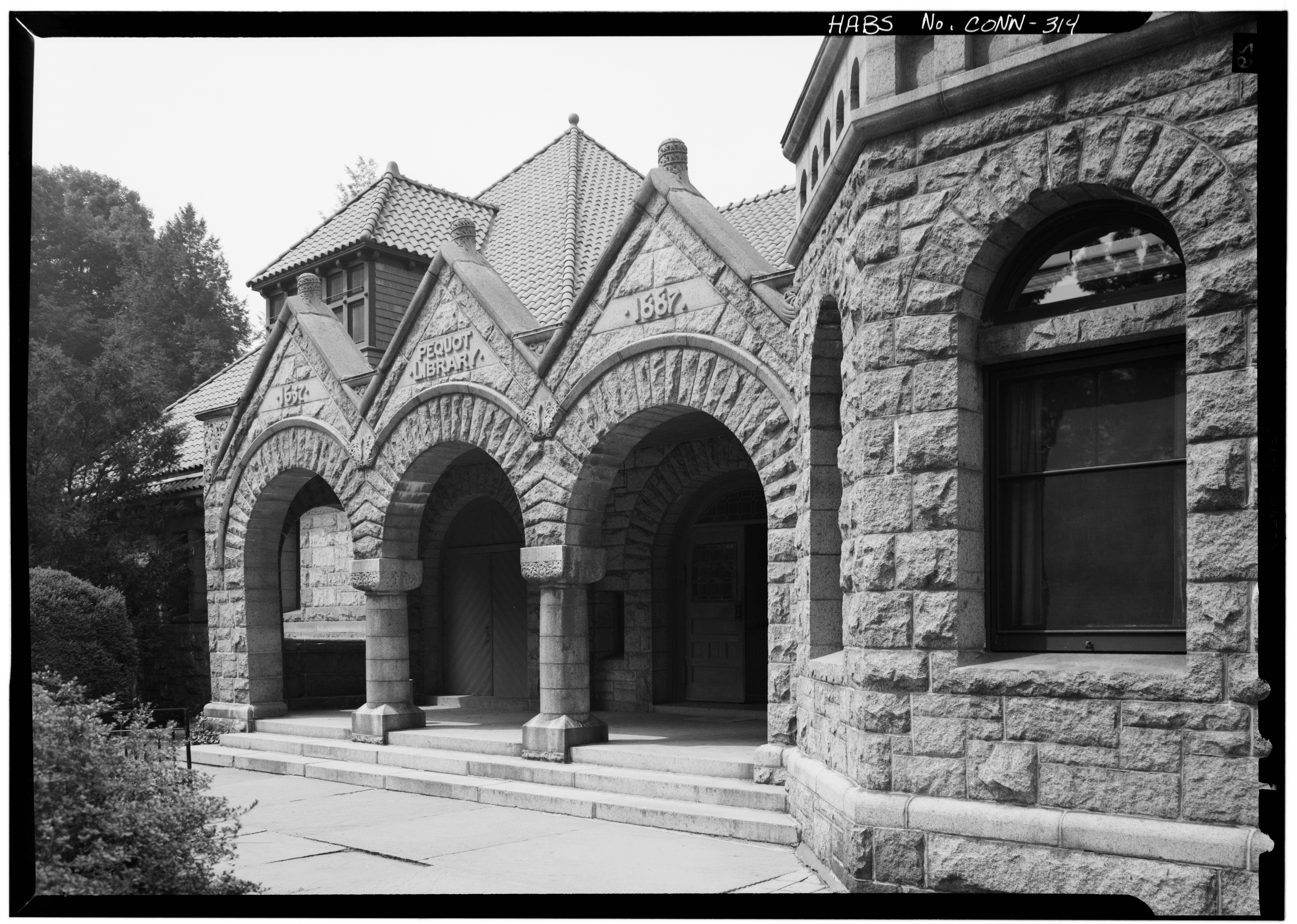
1966 detail of southeast front façade

== Special Collections ==
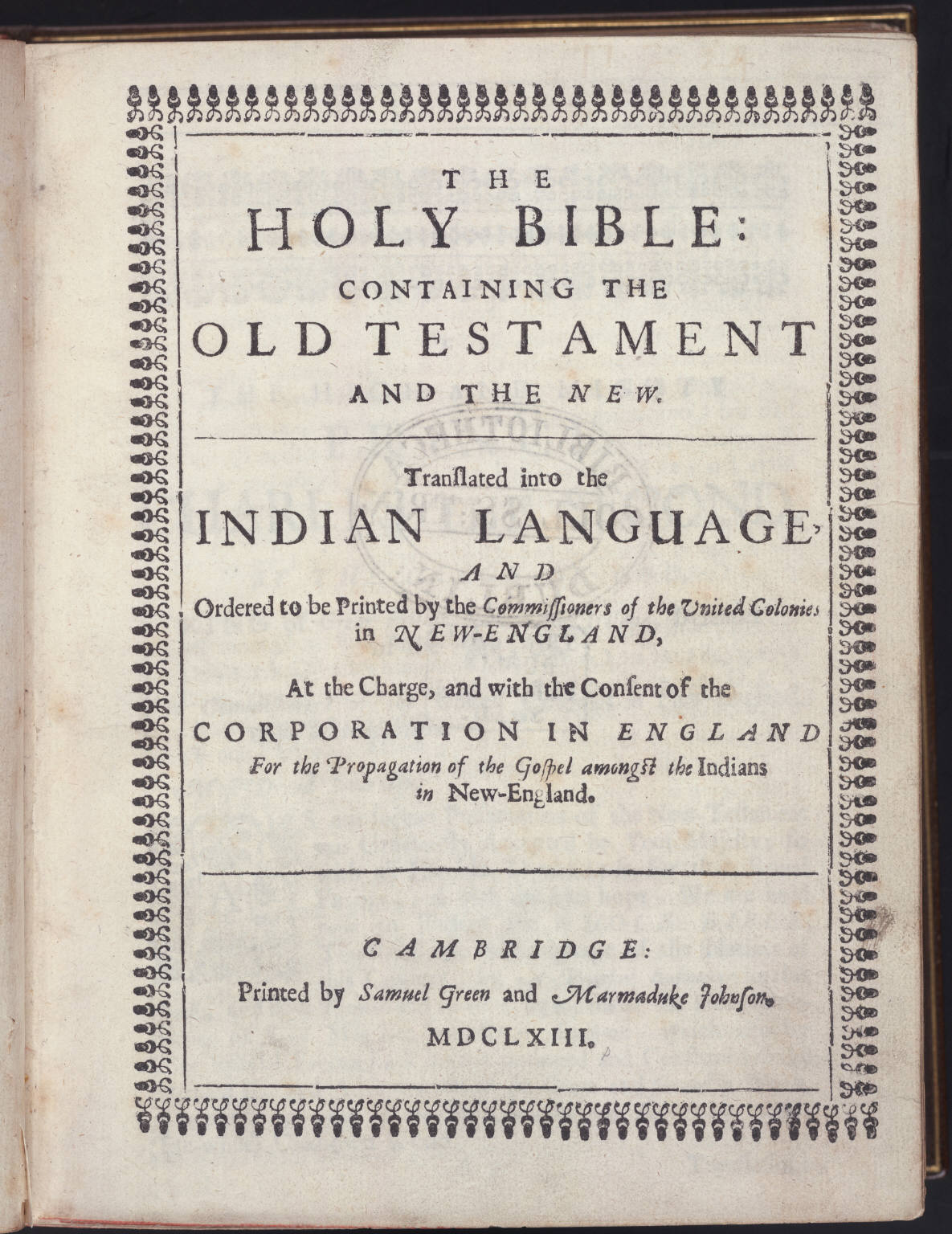
Cover of 1663 Bible translated into the Wampanoag language

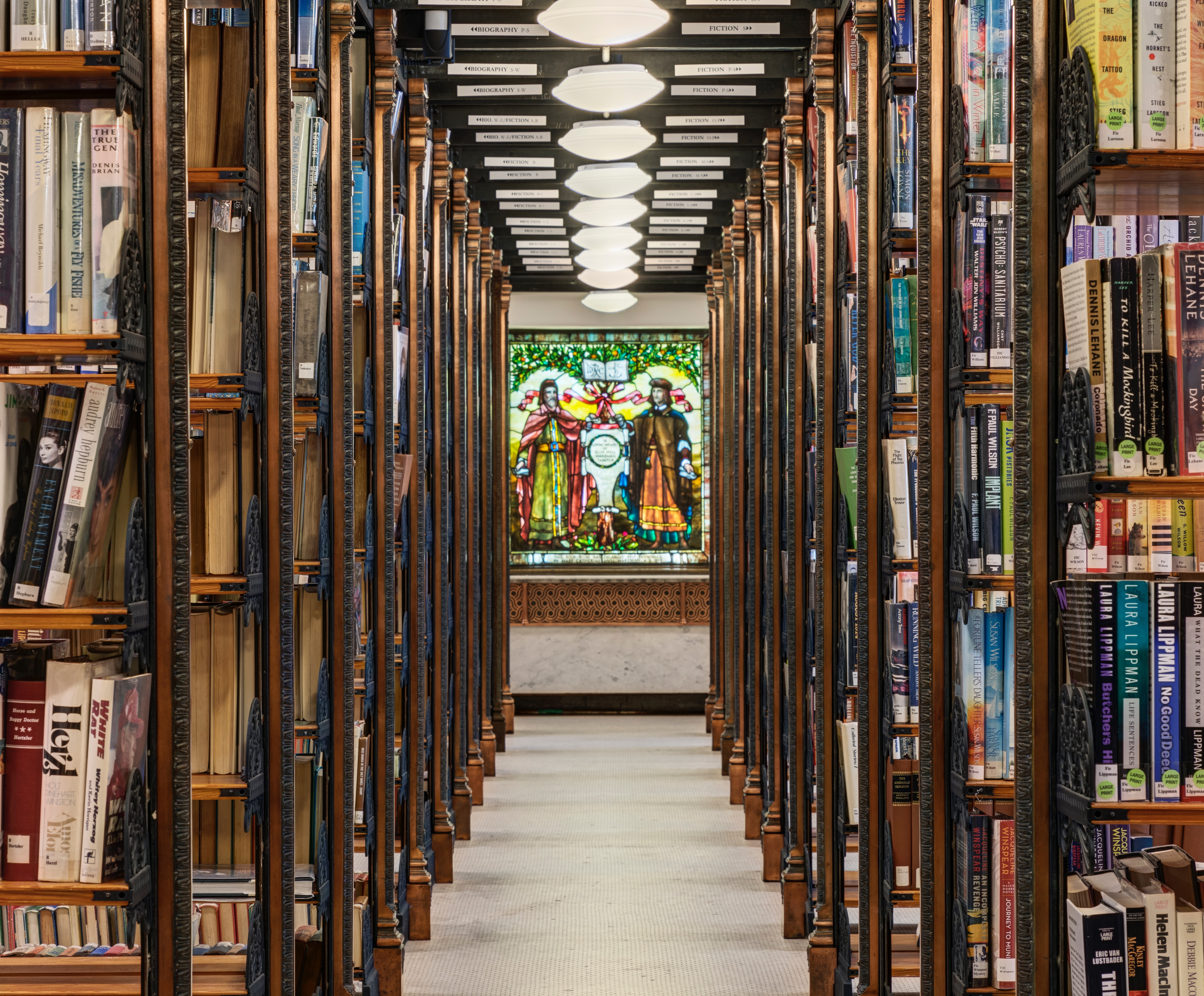
The Pequot Library main book stack room, facing Tiffany glass on the northwestern wall.

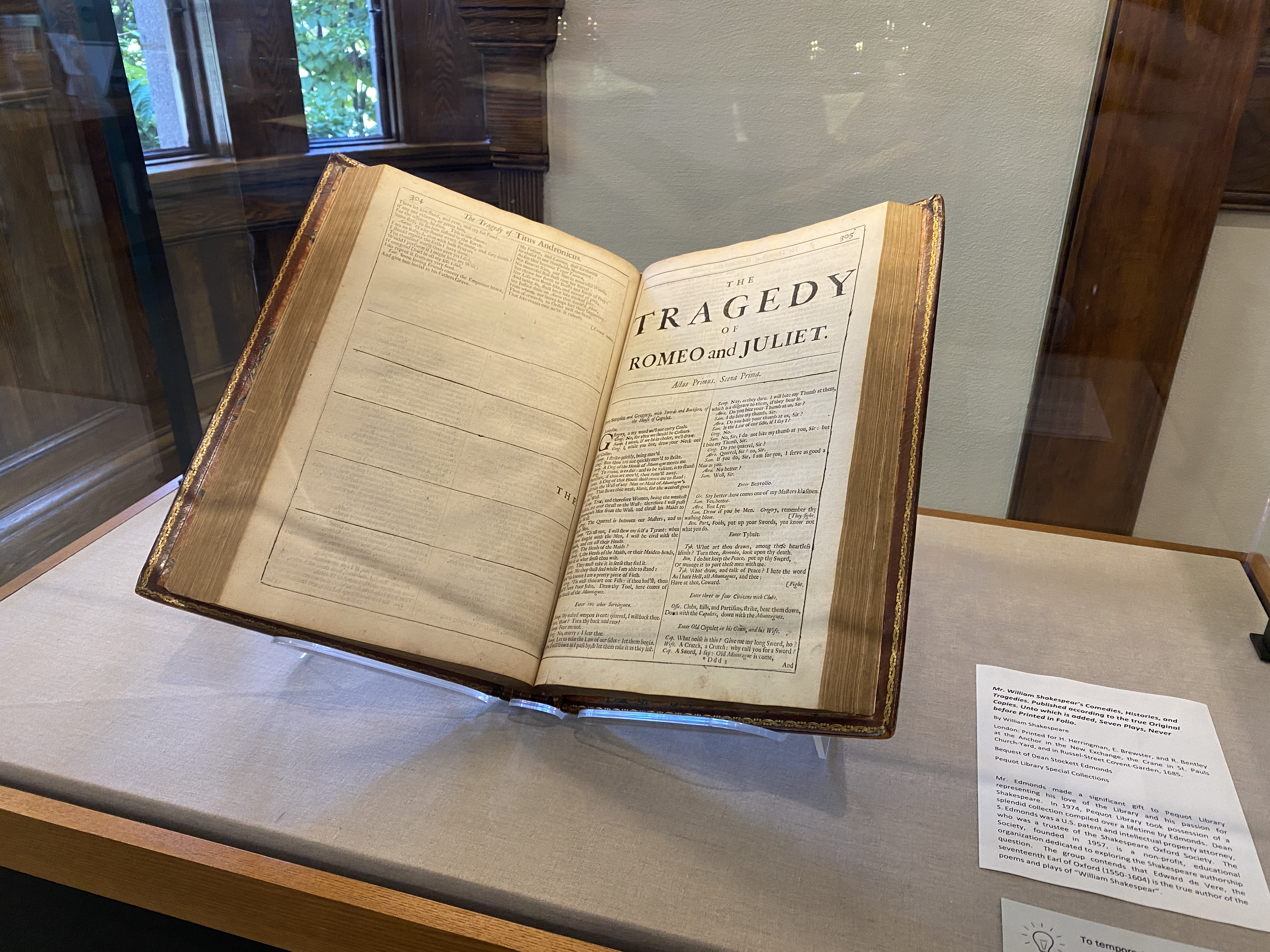
Copy of "Mr William Shakespear's [sic] Comedies, Histories and Tragedies", 1685. Donated to Pequot Library by Dean Stockett Edmonds in 1974.

The library has a large special collections consisting of manuscripts, rare books, and archives. The permanent special collection includes historically significant early American manuscripts, archives, rare books, artifacts, artwork, maps, and photographs. In total, the special collections house more than 30,000 items, many there since the library opened in 1894. Most items are available for view by appointment only with staff supervision in the Dillon Reading room of the library. The Pequot library founders built the original collection to document early Americana related to the thirteen original colonies, but it has since been expanded to include early printed books, medieval manuscripts, Shakespeareana, and information from American publishing in the twentieth century. Highlights include a 1776 Norwich edition of Common Sense, sermons, and other theological works from the seventeenth to nineteenth centuries, material on Native Americans from the seventeenth to nineteenth centuries, and first editions of Louisa May Alcott’s works, and Kate Greenaway editions.

A highlight in the library's special collection is The Birds of America Volume 2, an oversized book (2.3 by 3.4 feet) that includes a collection of full color drawings by John James Audubon that his youngest son, John Woodhouse Audubon, re-issued in 1858. The prints were reproduced via chromolithography performed by Julius Bien of New York, who was a pioneer in the technique. The volume is also known as the "Bien Edition." The pages are turned to display a new print page monthly. It is on public display regularly in the library main reading room.

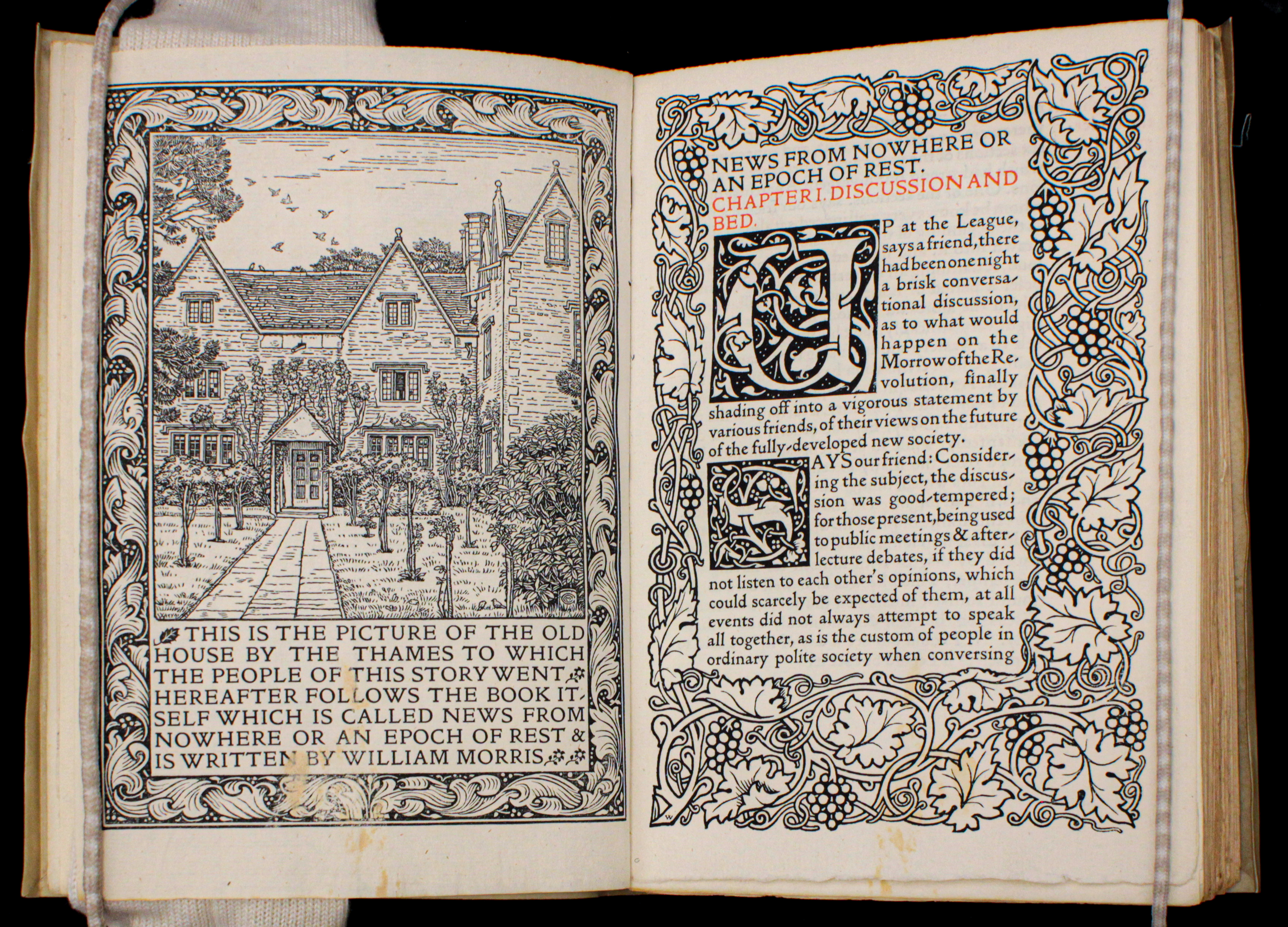
William Morris, News from Nowhere: Or, an Epoch of Rest (London: Kelmscott Press, 1892); Pequot Library Special Collection

Of the approximately 30,000 items in the Collections, 1,800 items are held on long-term loan at the Beinecke Rare Book & Manuscript Library at Yale University as the Monroe, Wakeman, and Holman Collection. That Collection includes the first printed cookbook, De Honesta Voluptate et Valetudine,by Bartholomaeus Platina (1475); the cosigners of the Declaration of Independence, including the rare Button Gwinnett autograph. It also includes much of the material associated with Joel Barlow. Among the titles in the special collections are Epistola de insulis nuper inventis by Christopher Columbus, translated into Latin by Leandro di Cosco and printed in 1493; two of the three contemporaneous histories of the Pequot War in New England; the Saybrook Platform which was the first book published in Connecticut in 1710. Also included in the collection is Phillis Wheatley's Poems on Various Subjects, Religious and Moral from 1786.

Another special collections highlight centers on the private press movement, with a special emphasis on the Kelmscott Press. Privately printed books were an ideal method for artists and writers, such as William Morris, to promote the philosophy of the Arts and Crafts movement. They believed that traditional craftsmanship brought about beautiful objects, bringing joy to the workers that created them, while the low quality substitutes of the Industrial Revolution emphasized profit over craftsmanship and were made in factories ruinous to society and the environment alike.

Morris designed and formatted each of the Kelmscott Press's 53 books. The Works of Geoffrey Chaucer, held by the Library, is seen as the crowning achievement of the press.

Another collection includes the only surviving typescript of the last four chapters of Margaret Mitchell's Gone With the Wind.

== Community events ==
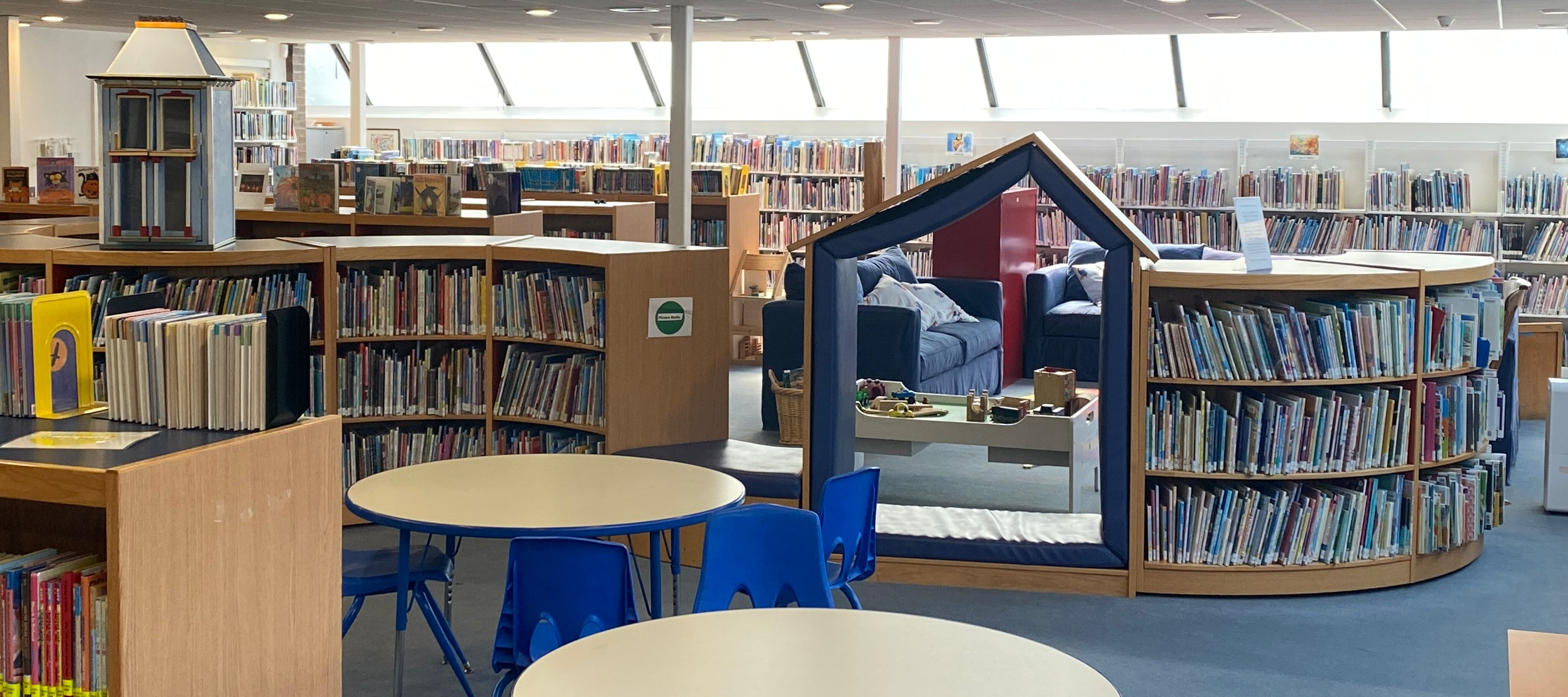
Pequot Library children's section.

The library accepts used book donations and hosts three large used book sales every year, with the summer sale often being considered the largest in Connecticut. Attracting around 8,000 people annually, it is the library’s largest special event, raising a significant percentage of the library’s operating budget. The sale generally has more than 60 different categories of books and media. There are also hundreds of CDs, DVDs, records and tapes. In 2007, the annual summer book sale featured more than 140,000 volumes.

== Public Programs ==
Robert H. Robertson plan for Pequot Library

Pequot Library is renowned throughout Fairfield County for its adult public programming. The landmark "Meet the Author" series typically occurs monthly, attracting New York Times bestselling authors from across the country, including Amor Towles, Dava Sobel, Jeff Benedict, Paul Freeman, Adam Hochschild, Beatriz Williams, Hugh Howard amongst others.

The programming compliments the diverse array of items featured in the library's special collections. For example, 2023's exhibition, "The Book Beautiful: Selections from the Private Press Movement," acclaimed art historians from the Yale Center for British Art lectured on William Morris and his contribution to the field of textiles. This talk also highlighted the inherent beauty of the library's William Morris-illustrated Canterbury Tales. To complement the robust collection of Shakespeare Folios, Pequot Library has hosted adult learning opportunities with trained educators in a seminar-style format. The Pequot also hosted Pulitzer Prize winning historian Stephen Greenblatt, who explored the intricacies of Pequot Library's Shakespeare holdings.

Talking Heads drummer, Chris Frantz, wrote a portion of his memoir, Remain in Love: Talking Heads, Tom Tom Club, Tina (2020), at Pequot Library. He has spoken at the Library multiple times, and has performed at the annual Onion Festival.

== Gallery ==
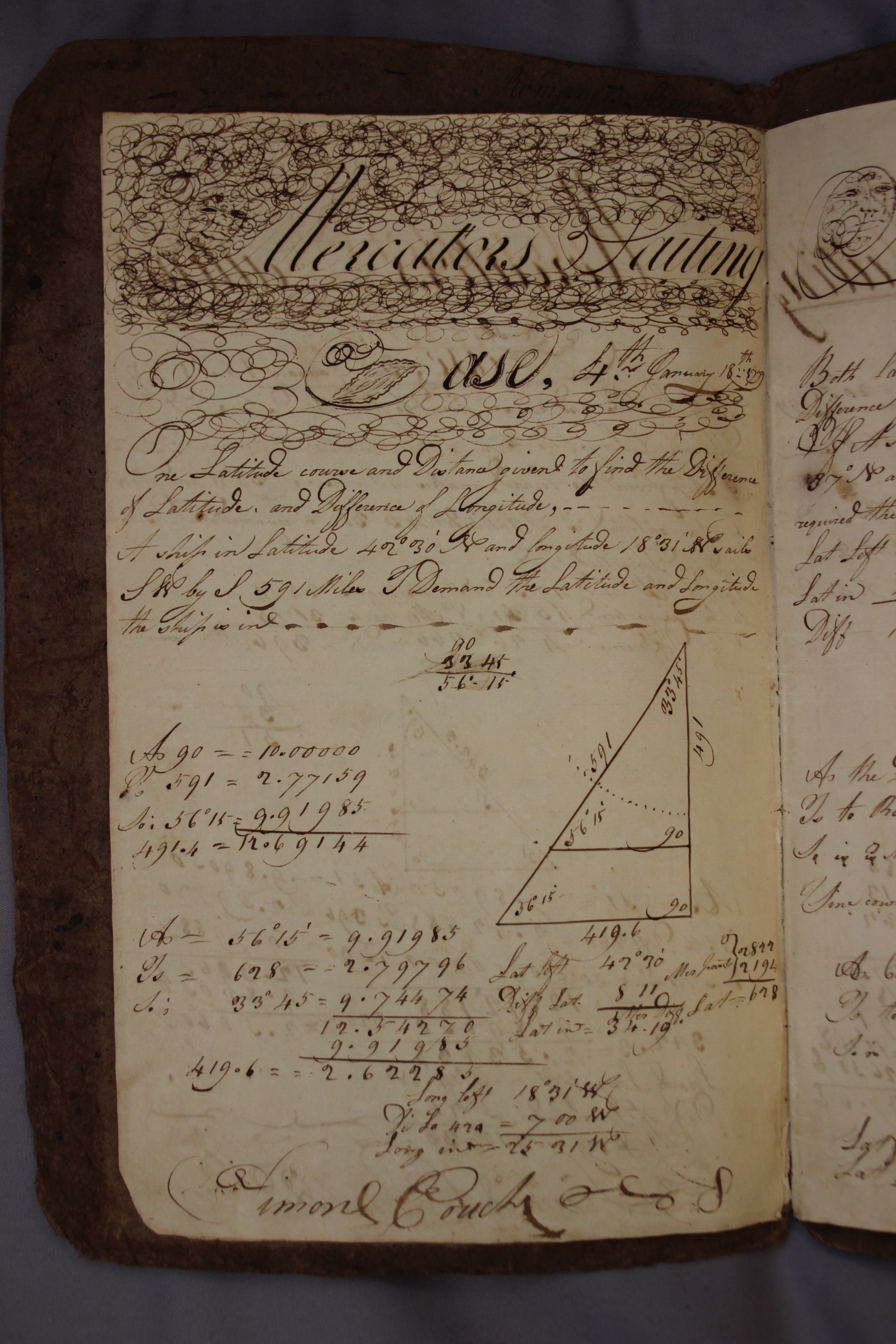
Problems in Geometry and Navigation, Simon Couch (1789); Pequot Library Special Collections

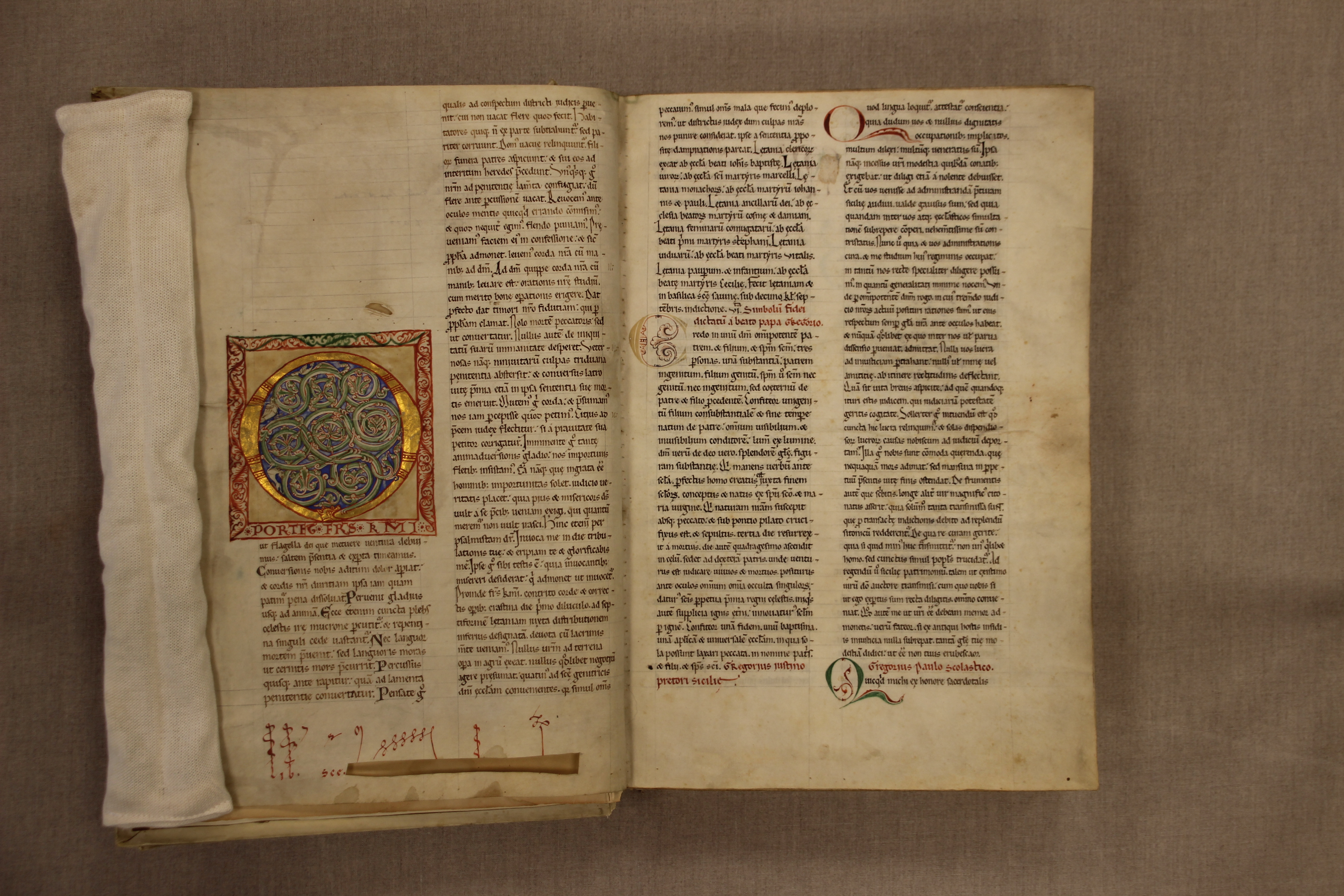
Medieval European illuminated manuscript; Pequot Library Special Collections

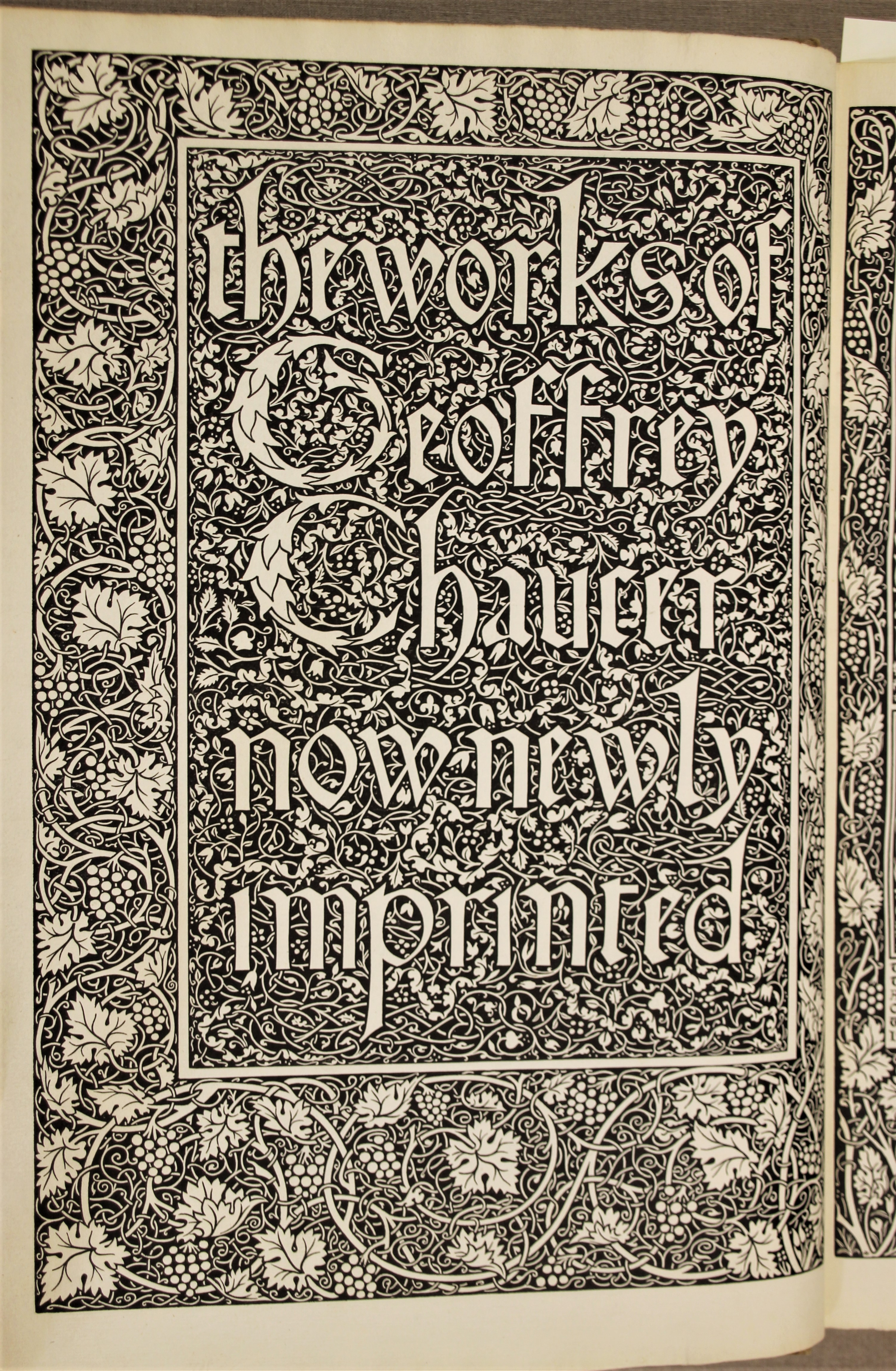
Geoffrey Chaucer, The Works of Geoffrey Chaucer (London: Kelmscott Press, 1896); Pequot Library Special Collections

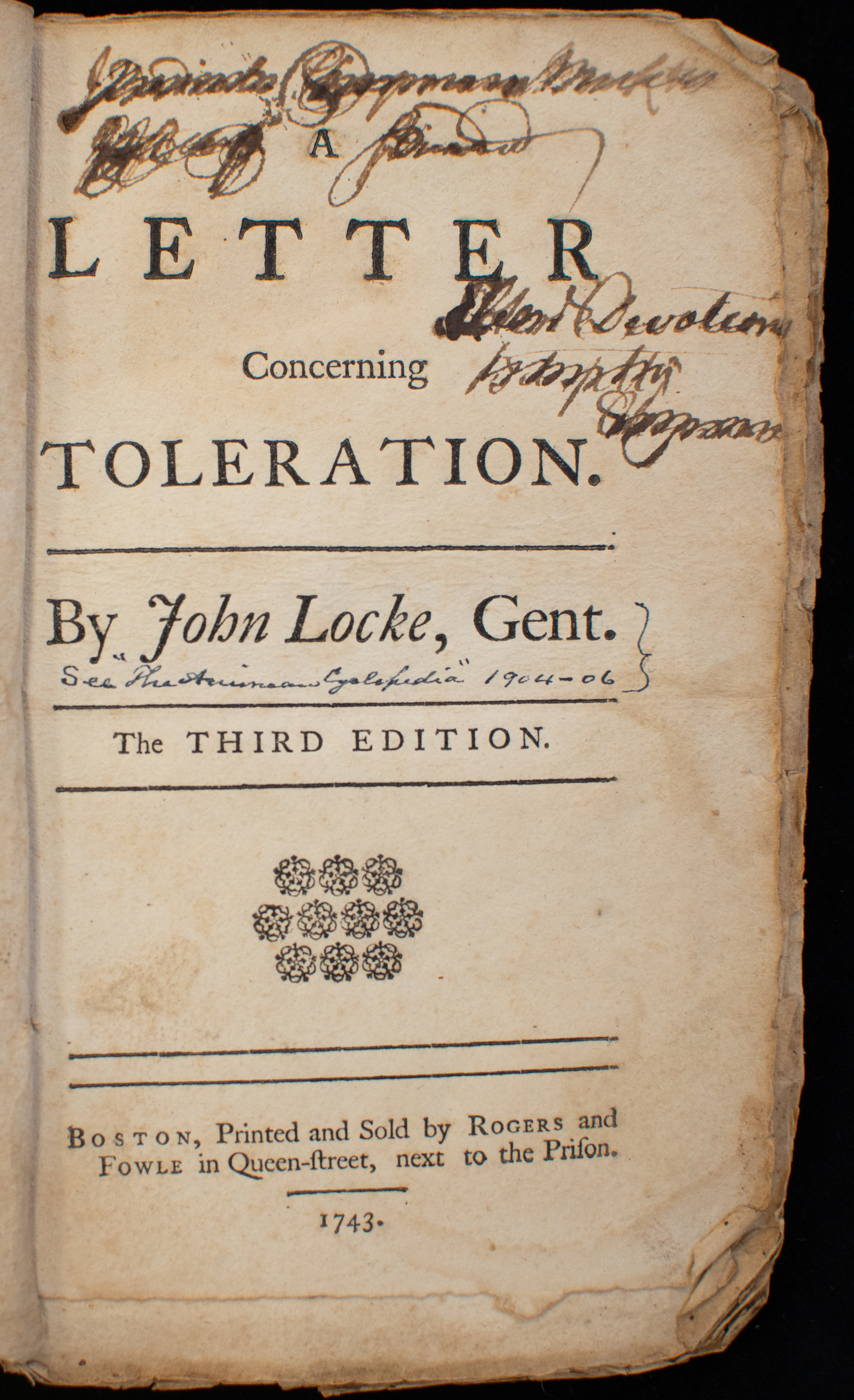
John Locke, A Letter Concerning Toleration (Boston: Rogers & Fowle, 1743); Pequot Library Special Collections

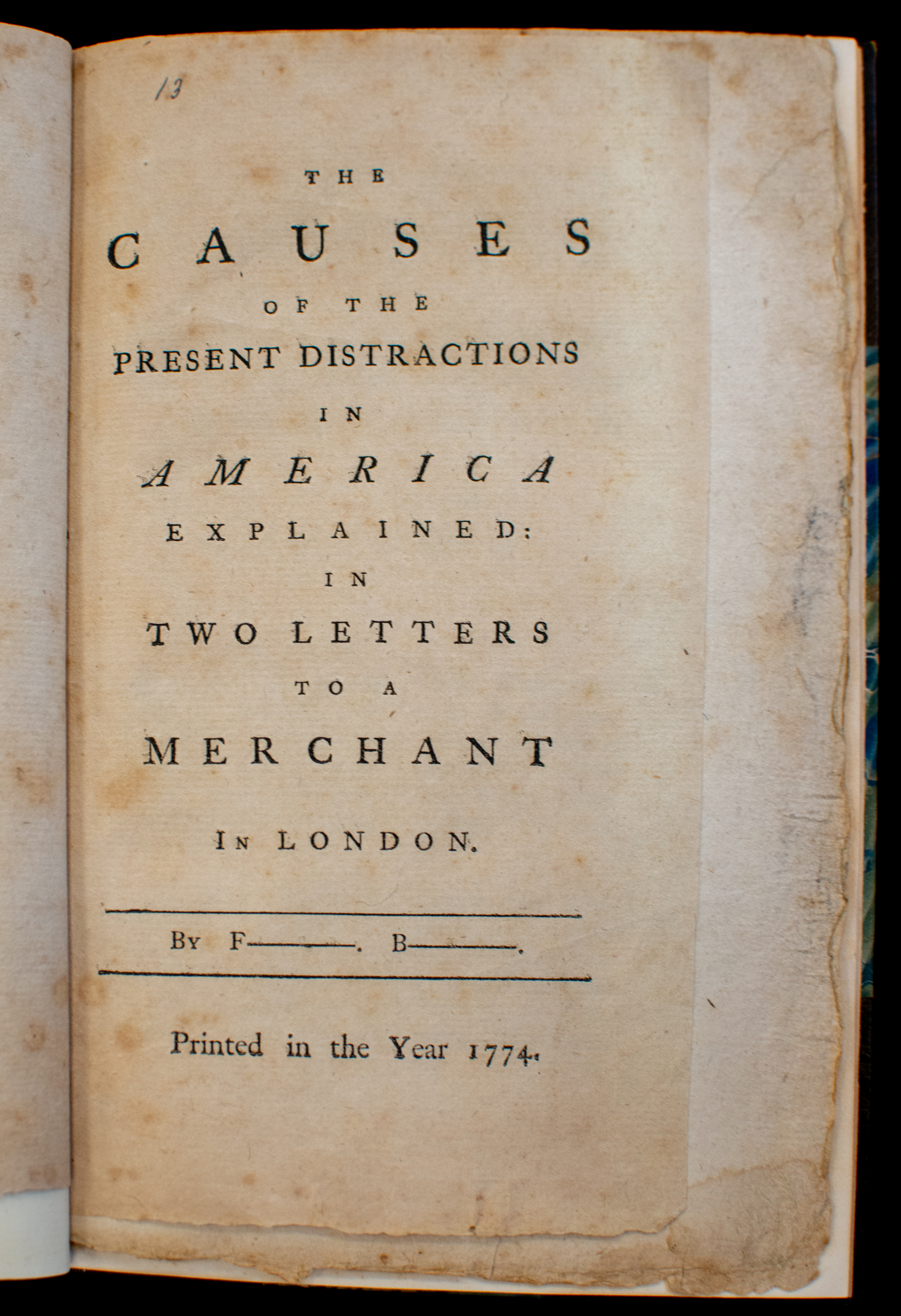
Benjamin Franklin, Causes of the Present Distractions in America (1774); Pequot Library Special Collections

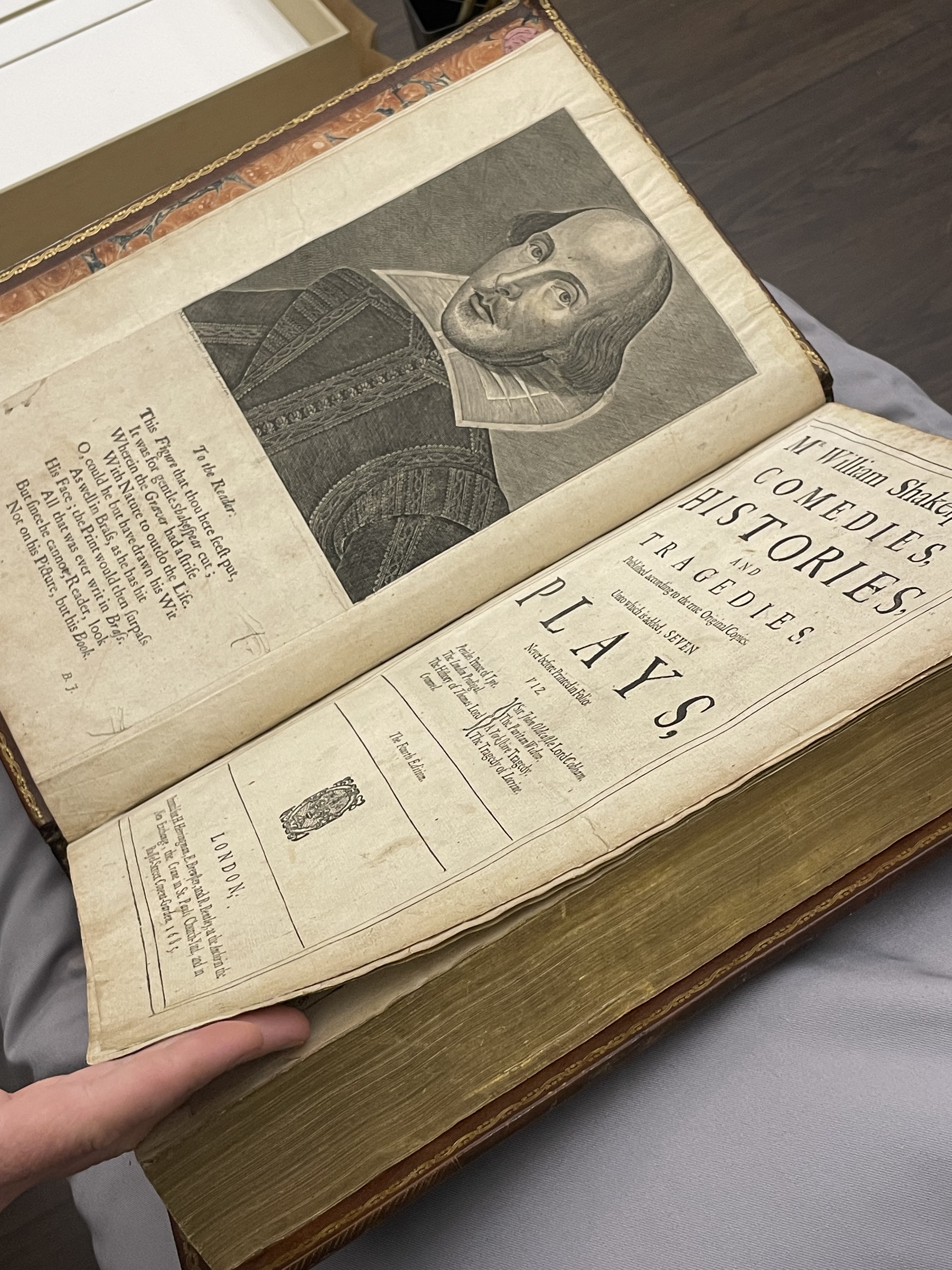
William Shakespeare, William Shakespeare's Comedies, Histories, & Tragedies (London: Thomas Coates, 1632); Pequot Library Special Collections

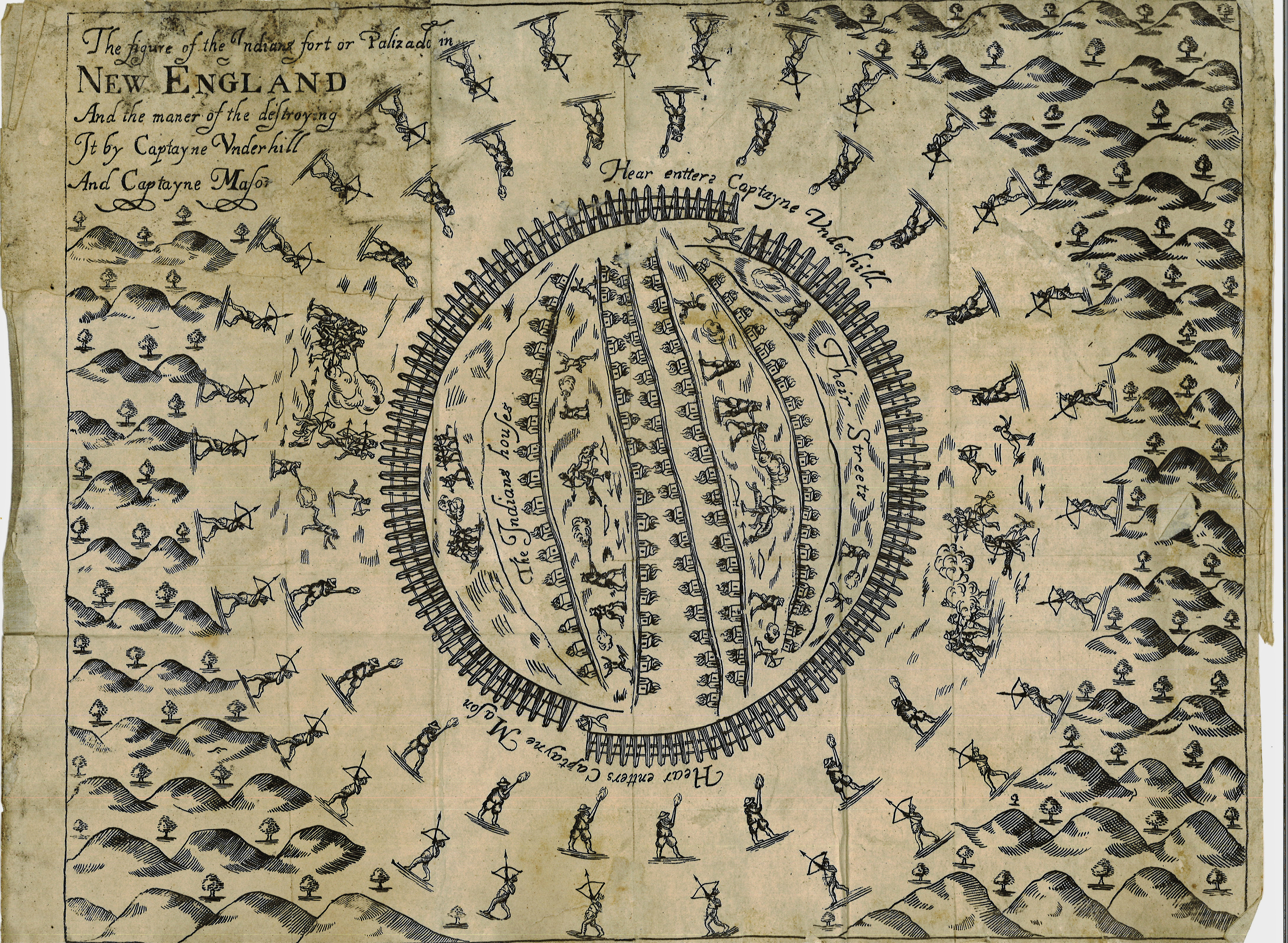
John Underhill, Newes from America (London: 1638); a contemporaneous account of the Pequot War; Pequot Library Special Collections
