= Joshua A.C. Newman =

Role-playing game designer

Joshua A.C. Newman is an American role-playing game designer.

== Career ==
Newman is the designer of the Indie role-playing games Under the Bed (2005), Shock: Social Science Fiction (2006), Beowulf (2008), Shock: Human Contact (2010), and The Bloody-Handed Name of Bronze (2016).

In 2012, Joshua A.C. Newman worked with Vincent Baker on a new version of the Mechaton rules as Mobile Frame Zero 001: Rapid Attack (2012), and Newman was able to use this for a successful Kickstarter. Rapid Attack was followed by Mobile Frame Zero 002: Intercept Orbit, a carrier-based spaceship battle game in the same universe.

== Roleplaying bibliography ==
- Under the Bed
- Shock: Social Science Fiction
- Shock: Human Contact
- Beowulf

Newman has also contributed to the book design of several other indie roleplaying games.

- Dogs in the Vineyard
- The Mountain Witch
- Bliss Stage
- Misspent Youth
