= Marquand =

Marquand may refer to:

== Surnames ==
- Allan Marquand (1853–1924), American art historian
- Christian Marquand (1927–2000), French director, actor and screenwriter
- David Marquand (1934–2024), British academic and politician
- Frederick Marquand (1799–1882), American silversmith, brother of Henry Gurdon
- Henry Gurdon Marquand (1819–1902), American philanthropist and collector, brother of Frederick
- Hilary Marquand (1901–1972), British politician
- Isaac Marquand (1766–1838), American silversmith and clockmaker, father of Frederick and Henry
- James Marquand (born 1964), Welsh film editor and director
- John P. Marquand (1893–1960), American novelist
- Richard Marquand (1938–1987), Welsh film director
- Ross Marquand (born 1981), American actor
- Tom Marquand (born 1998), British jockey

== Given names ==
- Marquand Manuel (born 1979), American football player

== Placenames ==
- Marquand, Missouri, United States
- Marquand Park, Public park, Princeton, New Jersey

== Companies ==
- Marquand and Co. (1804–1838), U.S. silverware firm

== See also ==
- Marquard (disambiguation)
