= Black, Starr & Frost =

American jewelry company

- Industry: Jewelry
- Predecessor: Marquand and Co.
- Founded: 1810
- Founder: Isaac Marquand
- Key people: Frederick Marquand, president Henry Gurdon Marquand
- Website: http://blackstarrfrost.com/

Black, Starr & Frost, previously known as Marquand and Co, is an American jewelry company. Founded in 1810 as Marquand and Co., the company is the oldest continuously operating jewelry firm in the United States. The company has acted as a retailer, rather than manufacturer, for most of its history.

== History ==
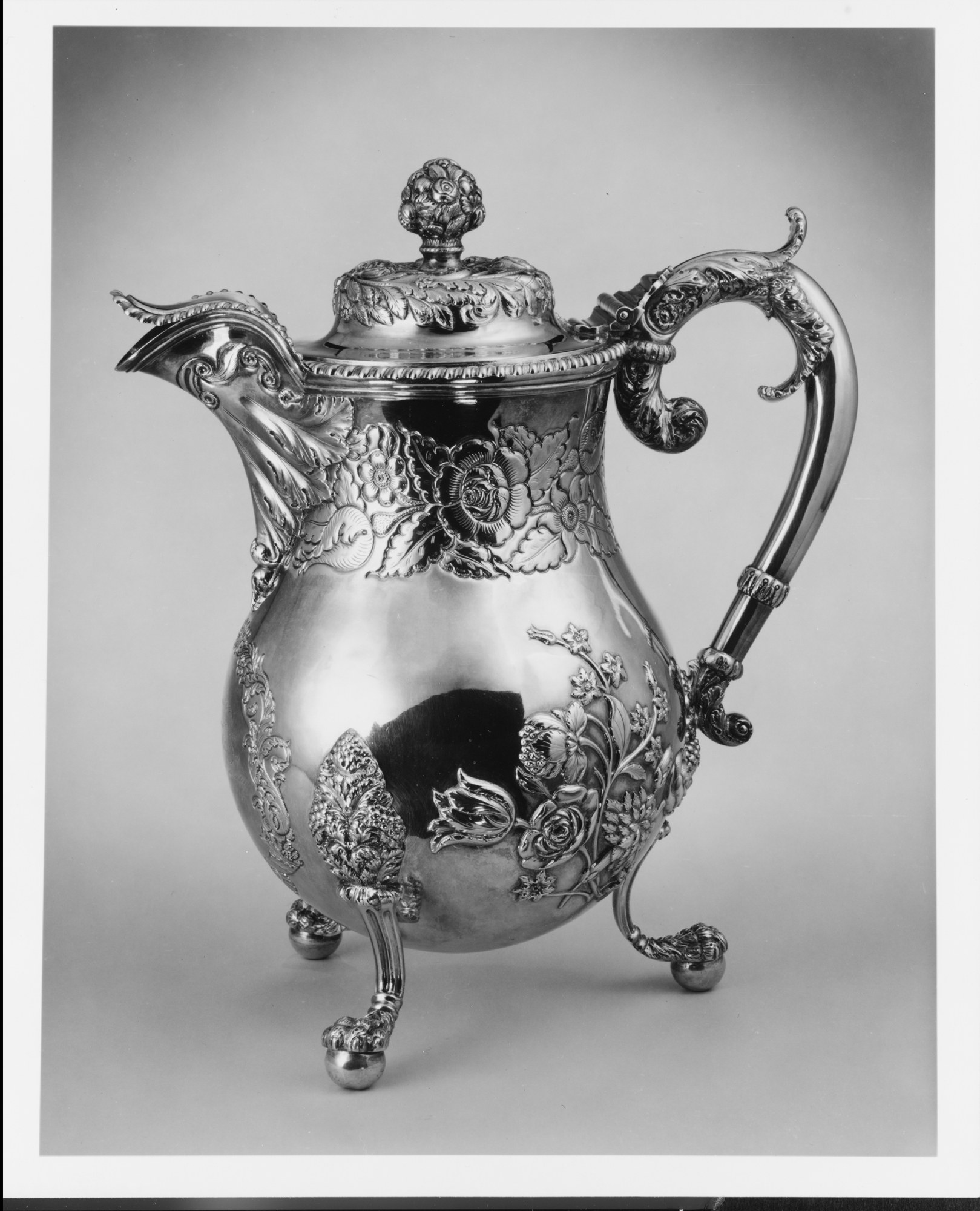
Ewer pitcher designed by Frederick Marquand. 1827. On display at Metropolitan Museum of Art.

Marquand and Co. was founded in 1804 by Connecticut silversmith Isaac Marquand. In 1820, Isaac's son Frederick moved to Savannah, Georgia, with his cousin, Josiah Penfield, to open their own silversmith trade. However, the two left Savannah in 1824, with Frederick taking over the flourishing Marquand and Co. from his father. The company was headquartered at 166 Broadway, and over time became regarded as "the principal jewelers in the country," as stated in the obituary of Tiffany and Co. secretary Edward C. Moore.

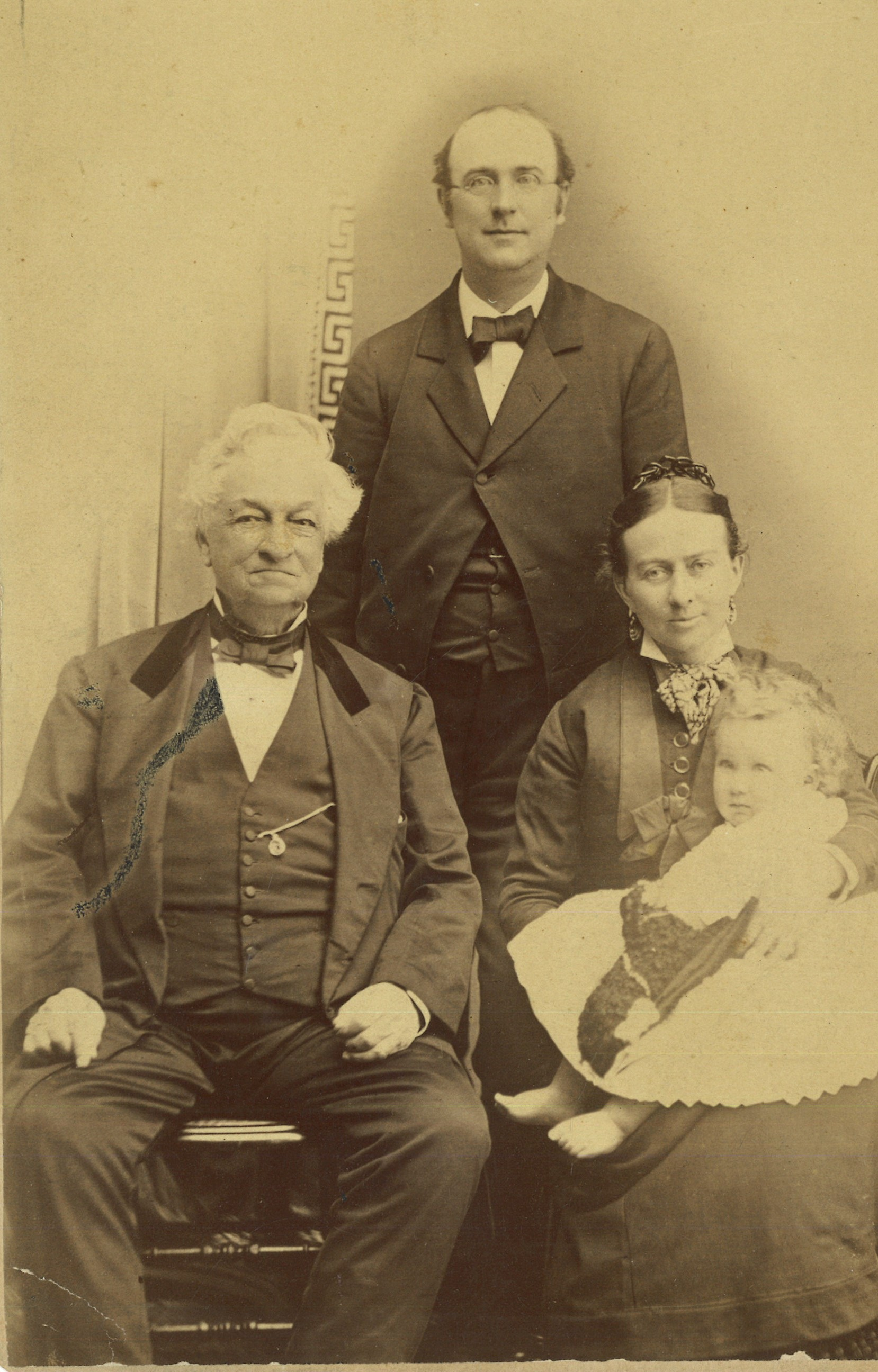
Frederick Marquand, who served as president of Marquand and Co. during its most profitable period. He was described by The New York Times as "the most prominent jeweler in the city."

Henry Marquand, an original trustee of the Metropolitan Museum of Art, briefly worked for the company before working on Wall Street in investment banking. Marquand was the second President of the Metropolitan Museum, and bequeathed Old Master paintings to the collection. Frederick Marquand, after serving as the President of Marquand and Company, sold the business in 1838 to former apprentices William Black and Henry Ball. The firm soon took the name Black, Ball, and Co. Frederick was later instrumental in the foundation of noted special collections institution Pequot Library. In 1839, the company was purchased by Henry Ball, Erasmus Tompkins, and William Black, and renamed Ball, Tompkins & Black until 1851 when it became Ball, Black & Company.

In 1860, the company opened a store at the intersection of Broadway and Prince Street in New York City. This was the first fireproof building in New York and was constructed of white marble. In its vaults the modern safe deposit system was fashioned. In 1876 it acquired its current name, Black, Starr & Frost, when new partners Cortlandt Starr and Aaron Frost joined the firm. The company's first apartment building and jewelry salon was opened on 28th Street and Fifth Avenue the same year. The C.T. Cook residence on Fifth Avenue and 48th Street was converted into the firm's new location in 1912. Other jewelers and diamond dealers moved to this area in the 1920s, which later became known as New York City's "Diamond District."

In 1929 it merged with the Gorham Manufacturing Company to become Black, Starr & Frost — Gorham. The new company opened for business in a remodeled building at Fifth Avenue and 48th Street on October 30, 1929. The name was eventually styled as Black Starr Frost Gorham, but reverted to Black, Starr & Frost in 1962 after being acquired by Marcus & Co., which later that year purchased Cartier USA. Kay Jewelers acquired Black, Starr & Frost in 1972 and expanded to 33 locations. In 1986, New York's The Plaza Hotel became home to another Black, Starr & Frost jewelry salon.

In 1990, Sterling Jewelers acquired Kay, Black, Starr & Frost's parent company; this was followed by Sterling's acquisition by Paul Lam of Costa Mesa, California, in 1991 and by the Molina Group in 2006, at which point its headquarters relocated to Phoenix. Since then, Alfredo J. Molina has served as chairman and CEO.

Molina published 1810: Celebrating Two Centuries of American Luxury in 2014.

In 2016, the firm closed its retail store in Newport Beach, California citing the inability to renew its lease.

== Products ==
Throughout its history, Marquand and Co. created silver products, including helmet-shaped gravy boats from 1833-39, as well as full-service tea sets. Many of their pieces are in the collections of the Metropolitan Museum of Art, as well as Savannah's Telfair Museums. In 1851, Ball, Black & Company displayed a pure gold four-piece tea service at the Crystal Palace exhibition. Black Starr & Frost was one of five jewelers invited to exhibit at the New York World's Fair in 1939; they chose to display two jewel-encrusted Mystery Clocks – the only square-faced Mystery Clock in the world and the “Tree of Knowledge of Good and Evil”. In 2012, it sold the Archduke Joseph Diamond, a 76-carat, D-color, internally flawless diamond, the largest D color internally flawless Golconda diamond in the world for $21.5 million at Christie's Geneva Magnificent Jewels auction, setting three world records for the sale of a colorless diamond. In 2015, the firm designed and crafted The Empress: a $4.5 million necklace which features 30 untreated Burmese sapphires totaling 11.9 carats; 34 oval diamonds, weighing 10.56 carats; and 404 round diamonds totaling 82.61 carats – all set in platinum.

Notable awards, medals, and trophies made by Black, Starr & Frost throughout its history include the Gillmore Medal (1863), Kearny Cross (1863), key for the ceremonial opening of the New York Public Library (1911), the Astor Cup (1915), and the silver platter for the Davis Cup (1921).

== Clients ==
During the 19th century, the company's clients included members of the Rockefeller, Vanderbilt, Carnegie, and Guggenheim families. In 1859, the company provided more than $100,000 in pearls and diamonds to the bride Frances Amelia Bartlett as a gift from the groom Don Esteban Santa Cruz de Oviedo in the “Diamond Wedding” at St. Patrick's Cathedral. Ball, Black & Company received an order for more than $12,000 of jewelry and silverware from Edward, Prince of Wales. At the time of Abraham Lincoln's assassination in 1865, his wife Mary Todd Lincoln owed $64,000 to the firm, equivalent to $11 million today. In 1917, Black, Starr & Frost sold a diamond necklace for $200,000 to stage star Peggy Hopkins Joyce, the inspiration for Lorelei Lee in the 1925 novel Gentlemen Prefer Blondes. In 1928, it sold her the 127-carat Portuguese Diamond for $373,000.

== Gallery ==
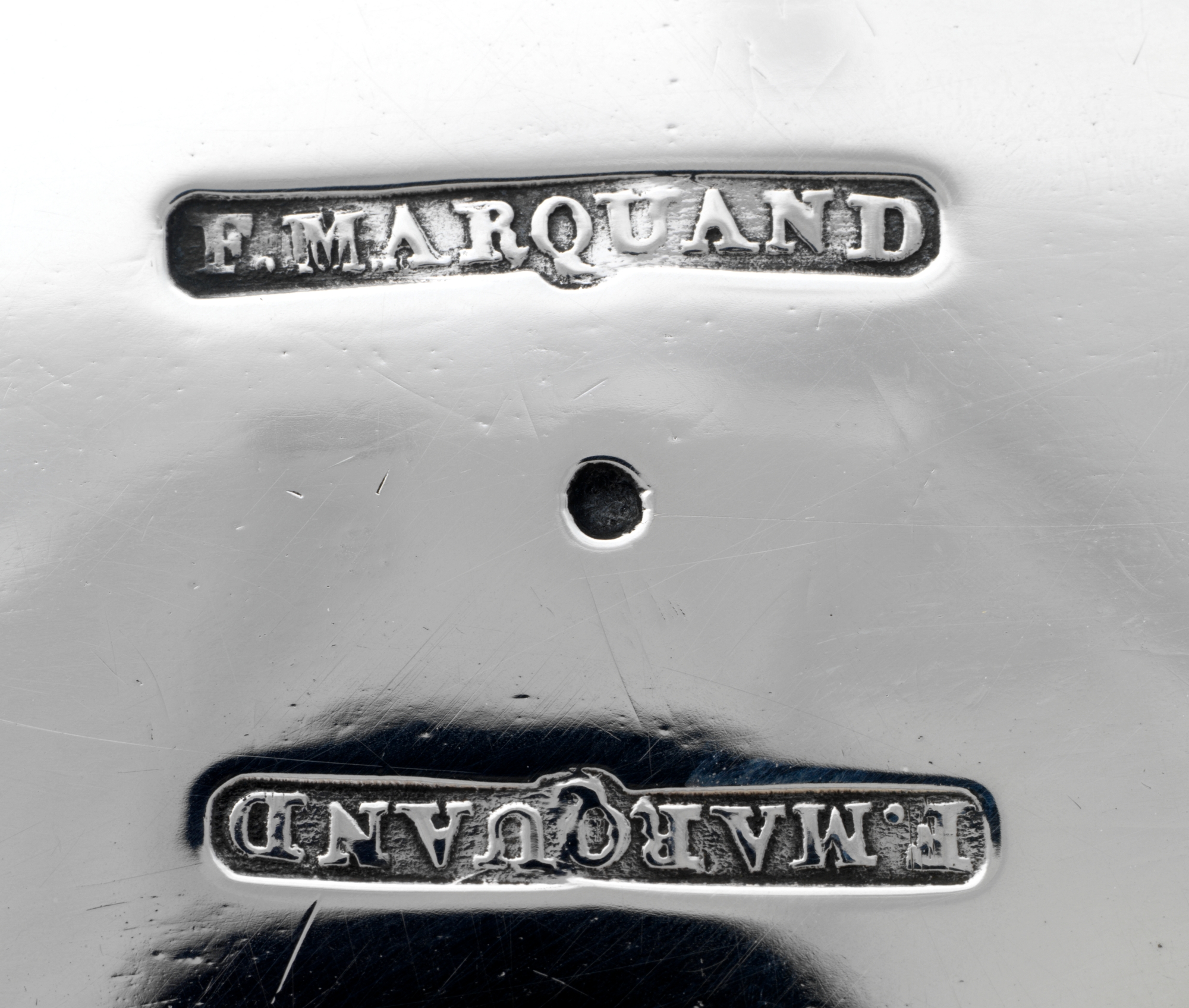
An example of the Marquand and Co. signature

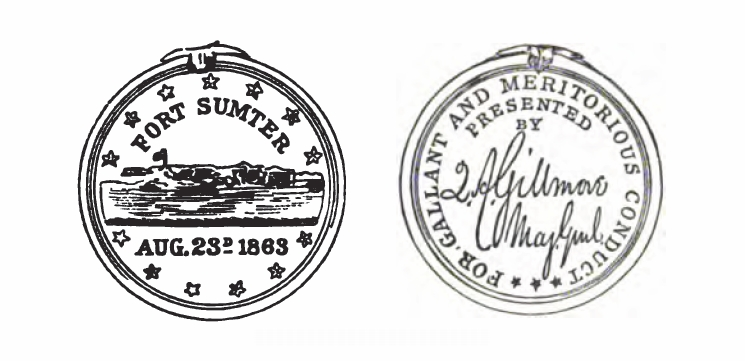
Gillmore Medal

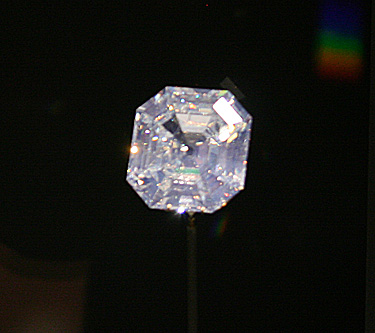
The Portuguese Diamond at the Smithsonian National Museum of Natural History, the largest faceted diamond in that collection.
