= Markward =

Markward is both a surname and a given name. Notable people with the name include:

- Mary Stalcup Markward (1922–1972), American FBI informant
- Markward von Annweiler (died 1202), regent of the Kingdom of Sicily

== See also ==
- Marquard (disambiguation)
