= Marquand and Co. =

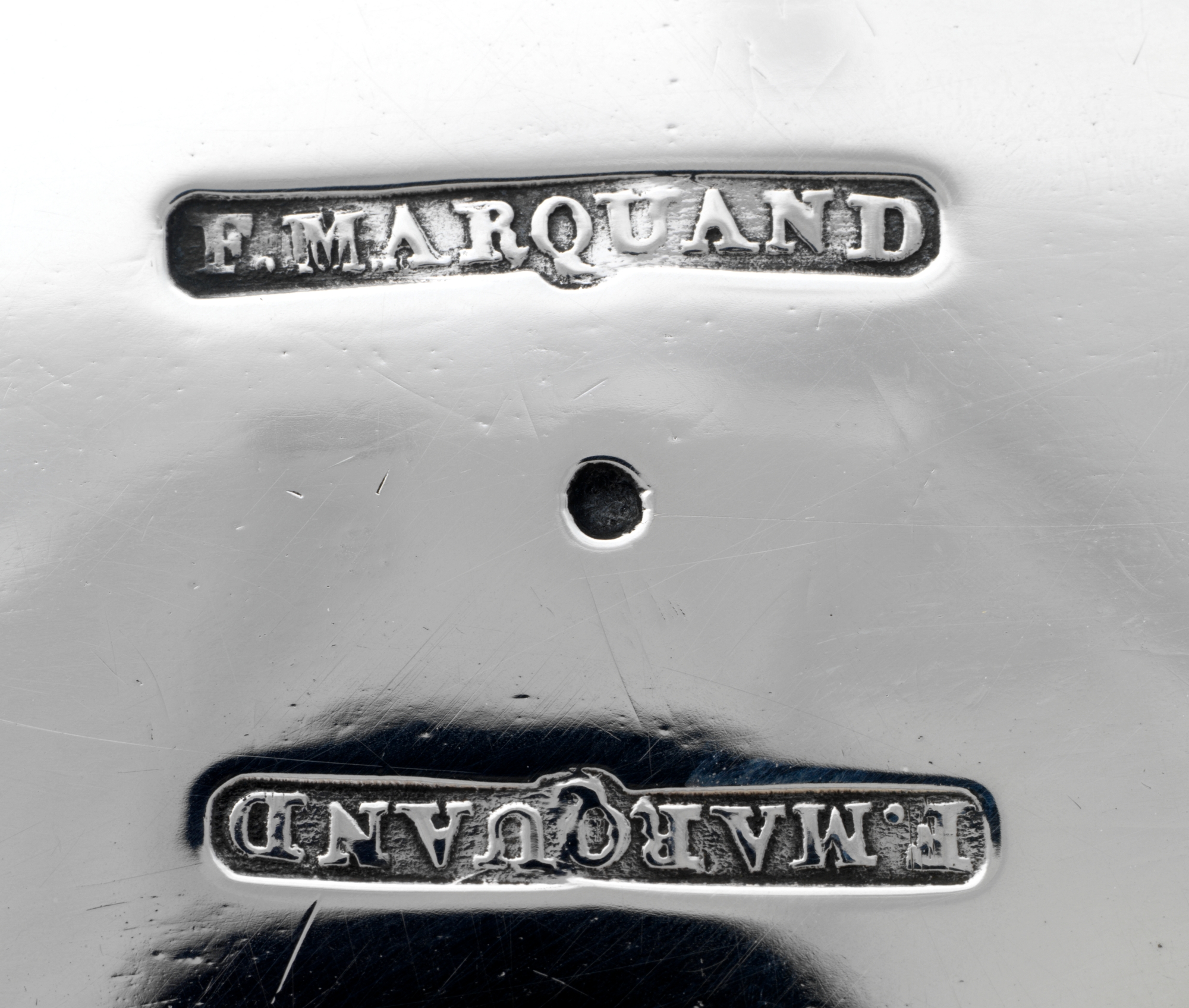
- Founded: 1804, New York City & Savannah, Georgia
- Founder: Isaac Marquand
- Defunct: 1838
- Fate: Sold to William Black and Henry Ball, becoming Black, Ball, and Co.
- Successor: Black, Starr & Frost
- Headquarters: New York, New York
- Key people: Frederick Marquand; Henry Gurdon Marquand
- Products: tea services; tongs; pitchers; trays; gravy boats

Marquand and Company was a U.S. silverware firm that was in business from 1804 to 1838. They specialized in intricate pieces of silver, such as tea services, tongs, pitchers, and trays. The company sold out of their specialty department store in New York City, as well as across the country. The Marquands, through their company, were able to amass a substantial fortune, allowing them to become major philanthropists. Frederick, for example, was instrumental in the founding of Pequot Library, while his brother Henry Gurdon Marquand played a pivotal role in establishing the Metropolitan Museum of Art.

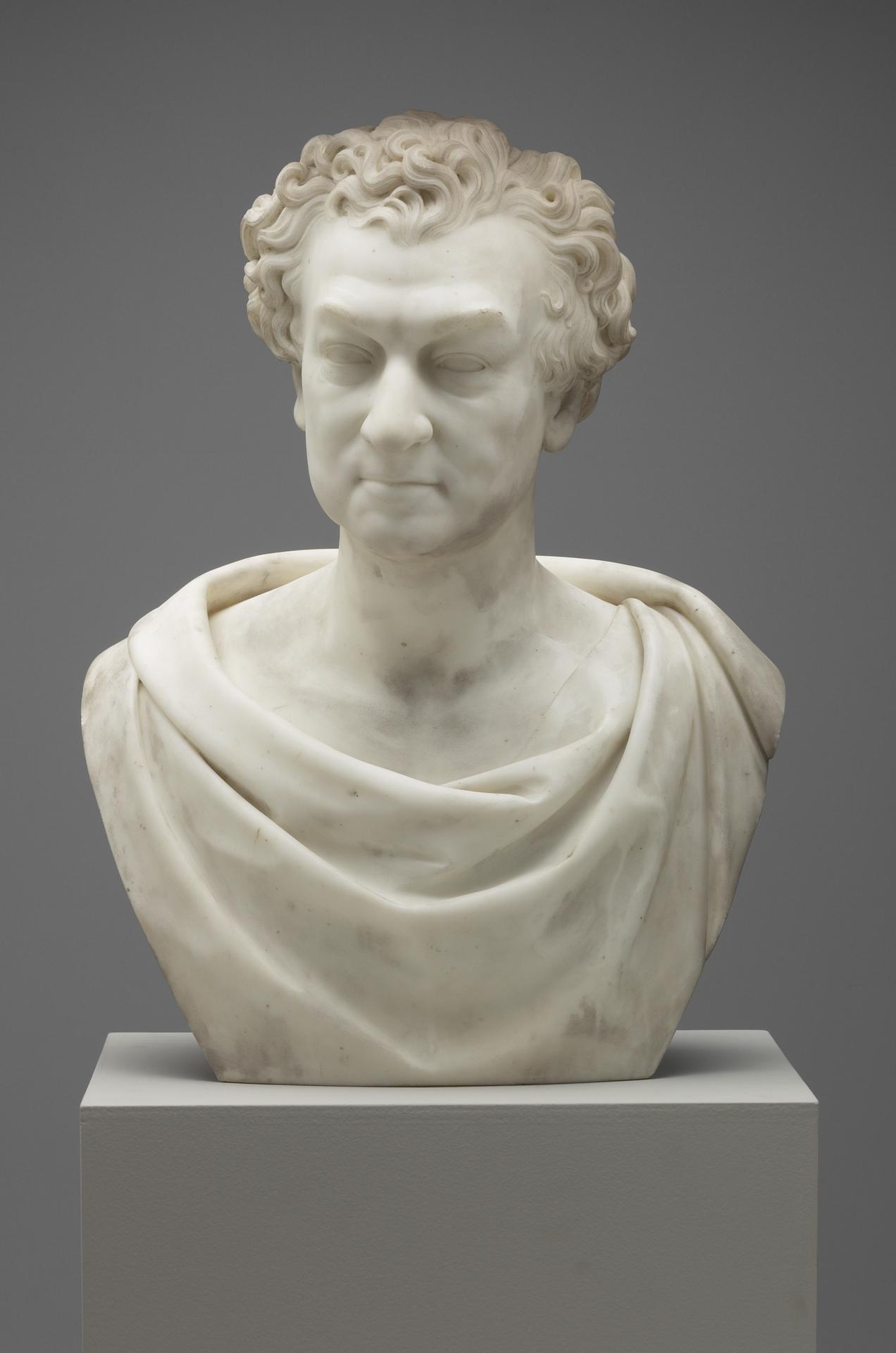
Bust of Frederick Marquand by Edward Sheffield Bartholomew (1856), in the collection of Yale Art Gallery.

== History ==
Marquand and Company was founded in 1804 by Connecticut silversmith Isaac Marquand. Over several years, the company grew and prospered significantly. Isaac was also well known for buying the work of other noted silversmiths, operating as a merchant and businessman. For instance, between 1801 and 1813, he purchased 6,333 pieces of silverwork from Teunis D. DuBois. In 1810, the company was headquartered in New York City, near Maiden Lane. Isaac traded with the silver markets in New Orleans, the West Indies, and London. However, foreign trade was damaged by the War of 1812, and some domestic trade slowed, with the company ordering significantly less wares from American tradesmen. In 1820, Isaac's son Frederick moved to Savannah, Georgia, with his cousin, Josiah Penfield, to open their own silversmith trade. However, the two left Savannah in 1824, with Frederick taking over the flourishing Marquand and Co. from his father. The company was headquartered at 166 Broadway, and over time became regarded as "the principal jewelers in the country", as stated in the obituary of Tiffany and Co. secretary Edward C. Moore. The business moved to 181 Broadway in 1833.

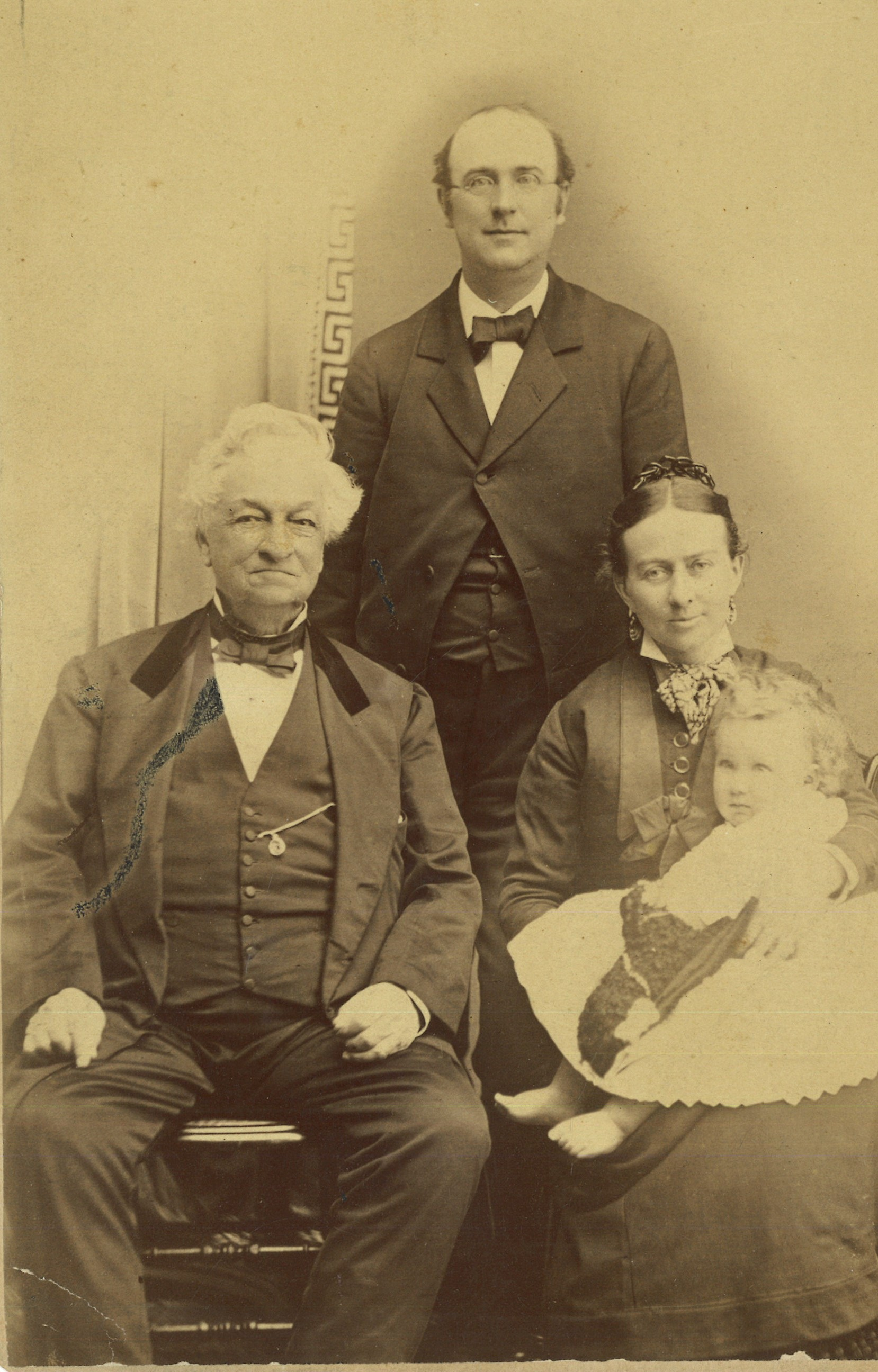
Frederick Marquand and Virginia Marquand Monroe, his adopted daughter and founder of special collections institution Pequot Library

Throughout their history, Marquand and Co. created a vast array of silver products, including "helmet" shaped gravy boats from 1833 to 1839, as well as intricate full-service tea sets. According to a contemporaneous article in the New York Times, Frederick was "the most prominent jeweler in the city". As of 2023 many of their pieces are held in the collections of the Metropolitan Museum of Art. He was also an early innovator in chocolate consumption, producing a pear-shaped chocolate pot for prominent New York surgeon Valentine Mott.

Marquand was working at a period when there was much general interest in work by the silversmiths of New York City. Organizations, such as the American Institute of the City of New York, which supported inventors, created a special class of awards for "precious metals" that were granted to the firm, as well as designer William Gale. An 1835 article in Mechanics' Magazine and Register of Inventions and Improvements described the impact of the firm: "The specimens of silverware exhibited by Mr. Marquand, 181 Broadway... produced the most agreeable astonishment, especially to us, who well remember when to produce a silver buckle in this country was a thing viewed with utter astonishment."

Henry Marquand, an original trustee of the Metropolitan Museum of Art, briefly worked for the company before working on Wall Street in investment banking. Henry was the second President of the Metropolitan Museum, where his bequest of Old Master paintings remains a central piece of the collection.

Marquand and Company was a prototype for American-made silver products, paving the way for companies such as Tiffany and Co. For instance, as the United States economy began to transform in the nineteenth century, Marquand and Co. was the top silver making firm available for costly commissions from business titans. Marquand silver was treated as a status symbol, and entered the art collections of numerous affluent collectors, such as that of Alphonso T. Clearwater and Charles Morgan. In 1836, Frederick was commissioned by the Schemerhorn family to design an elaborate water pitcher, now in the permanent collection of the New-York Historical Society, for John Peter Schemerhorn, the paternal uncle of Caroline Schemerhorn Astor. Marquand silver was also used at what is now the Hampton National Historic Site, where in 1994, a study was completed to accurately fill Charles Carnan Ridgely's Federal era dining room with authentic period home furnishings. Marquand silver was included, such as one of their popular fish knives.

In 1832, Frederick Marquand completed a commission for a gold medal, commemorating the role of a volunteer honor guard of George Washington's during the Revolutionary War. The medal contains miniature portraits of Washington and the Marquis Lafayette. It also contains the words "N. America" and "France". While James Fenimore Cooper was the American consul in Paris, he presented this object to Lafayette. It is now in the collections of the Winterthur Museum.

Aside from creating his own pieces, Frederick Marquand also promoted and sold work from other artists. John C. Moore, renowned for his tea sets, also worked predominantly with Marquand and Co. before making an exclusive deal with Charles Tiffany. Frederick also worked with craftsman William Garrett Forbes, with their two names sometimes appearing on one piece, while in other situations Marquand and Co. would sell Forbes' solo work.

After having been President of Marquand and Company, Frederick Marquand sold the business in 1838 to former apprentices William Black and Henry Ball. The firm soon took the name Black, Ball, and Co. Frederick took the proceeds from the sale of his business, and invested it in New York City real estate, as well as other financial ventures.

== Collections ==
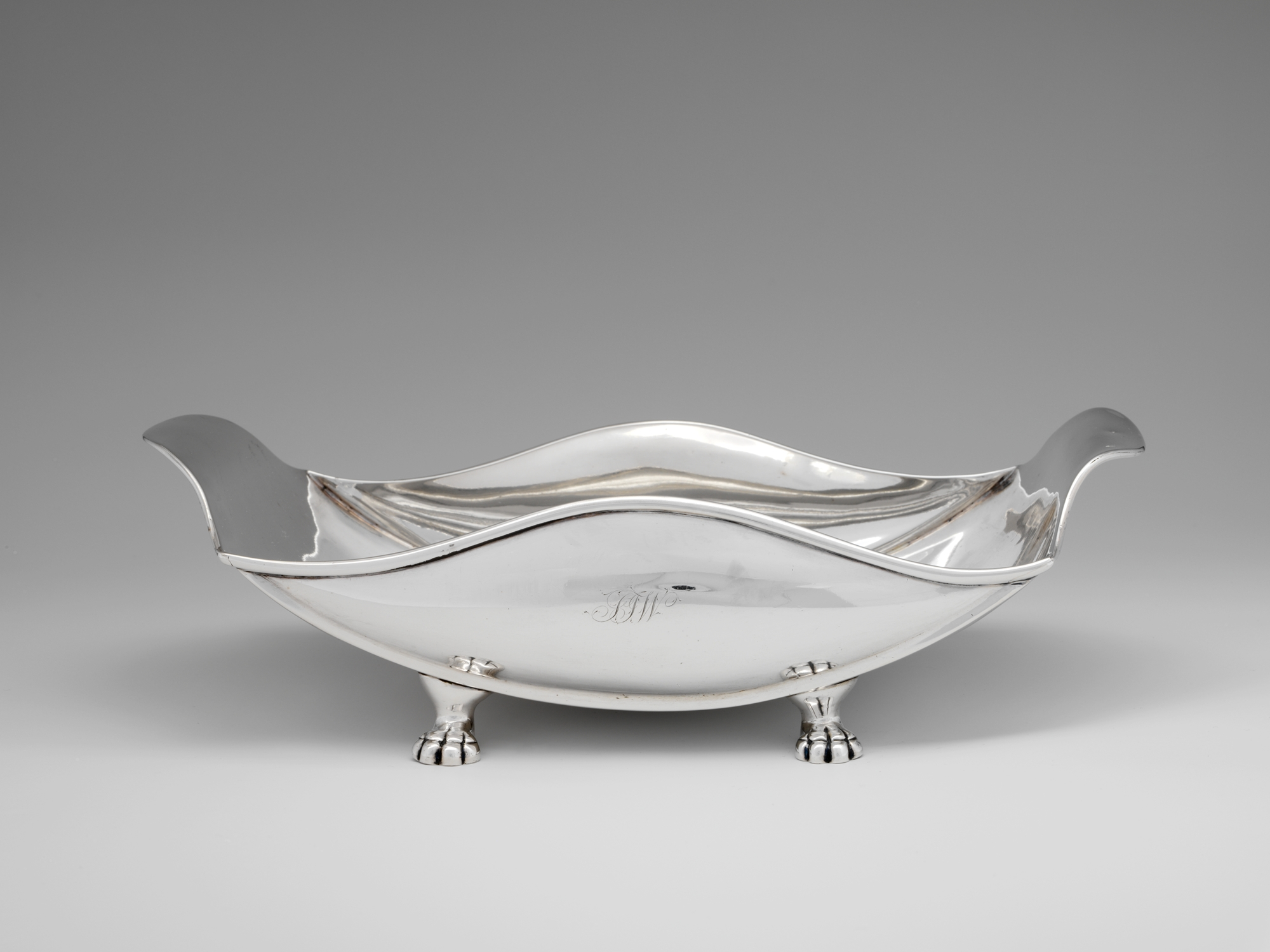
Silver dish created by Frederick Marquand of Marquand and Co.

Many of these pieces ended up in Gilded Age mansions throughout the east coast. Henry Gurdon Marquand, having grown wealthy, built his own mansion, "Linden Gate", in Newport. Constructed by Richard Morris Hunt in 1872, architecturally, it drew comparisons to Chateau sur Mer, owned by the Wetmore family. When the contents of Chateau sur Mer were auctioned off by Christie's, pieces of Marquand silver were in the collection. The Wetmores maintained many pieces of Marquand silver, eventually donating several to the New-York Historical Society.

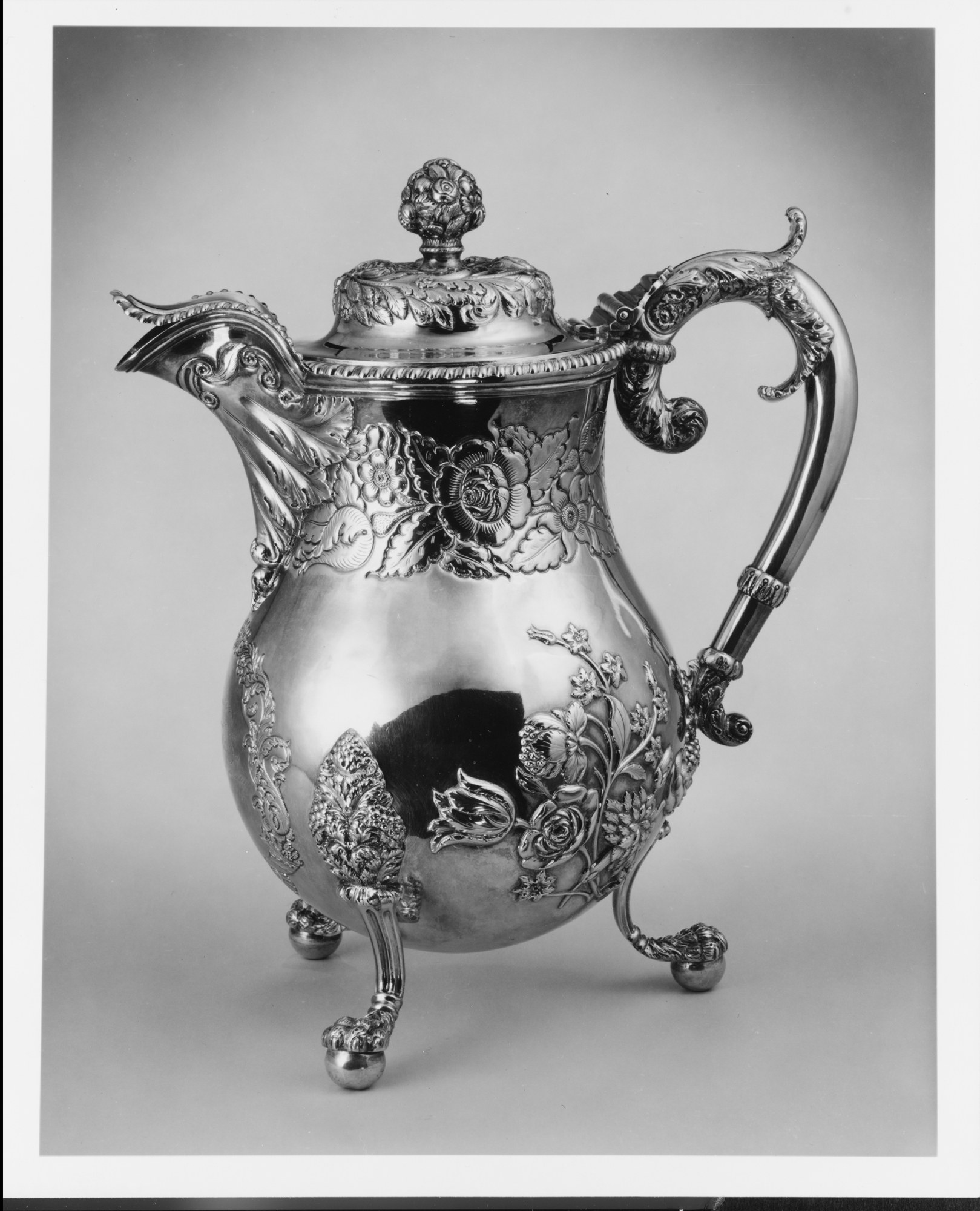
A silver ewer designed for Valentine Mott by Frederick Marquand in 1827, now on permanent display at the Metropolitan Museum of Art

Long after the company had been absorbed, original Marquand silver remained collectible. Curator and collector Sam Wagstaff had numerous pieces in his personal collection. After his death, the New-York Historical Society held an exhibition of his silver collection. Many of these pieces have gone to the permanent collection of the Metropolitan Museum of Art. The Winterthur Museum, founded by Henry Francis DuPont, also contains a large collection of Frederick Marquand's silver, as does the Museum of the City of New York.

Boston's Museum of Fine Arts maintains a rare silver spoon made by Frederick Marquand, dated 1830 and described as "Fiddle-shaped, wheat sheaf stem with curved shoulders, downturned end and shell drop at back joint; egg-shaped bowl". This highlights the intricacy of Marquand silver, as this spoon is simple compared with the larger commissions the firm completed during this period. Yale University's Art Gallery holds many pieces of more intricate Marquand and Co. silver, including examples of clockmaking. Since the Marquands mainly worked in New York City and Connecticut, the bulk of the collections containing Marquand silver are found in the northeast. However, owing to Frederick's early start in Savannah, Georgia, several southern museums have large collections. For instance, the Georgia Museum of Art has an intricate pitcher designed by Frederick with biblical scenes of the "Good Samaritan". Savannah's Telfair Museum also contains several unique pieces, including a detailed water pitcher. Many of Telfair's Marquand and Co. objects were previously in the collection of James A. Williams. Colonial Williamsburg also has Marquand objects in its permanent collection, including a silver urn-form pitcher, as does Atlanta's High Museum.

== Gallery ==
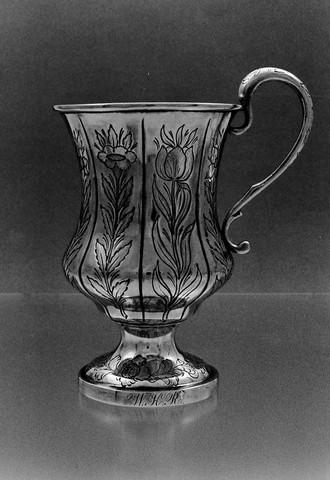
Silver cup by Marquand and Company (1838). In the collection of the Yale University Art Gallery.

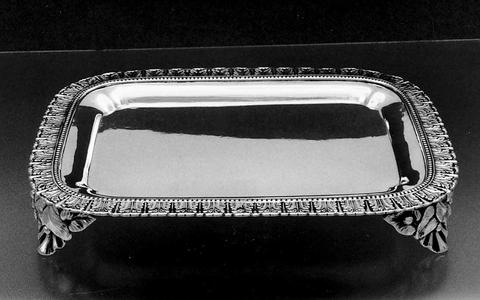
Marquand and Co. (1830–1838). Collection of the Yale University Art Gallery.

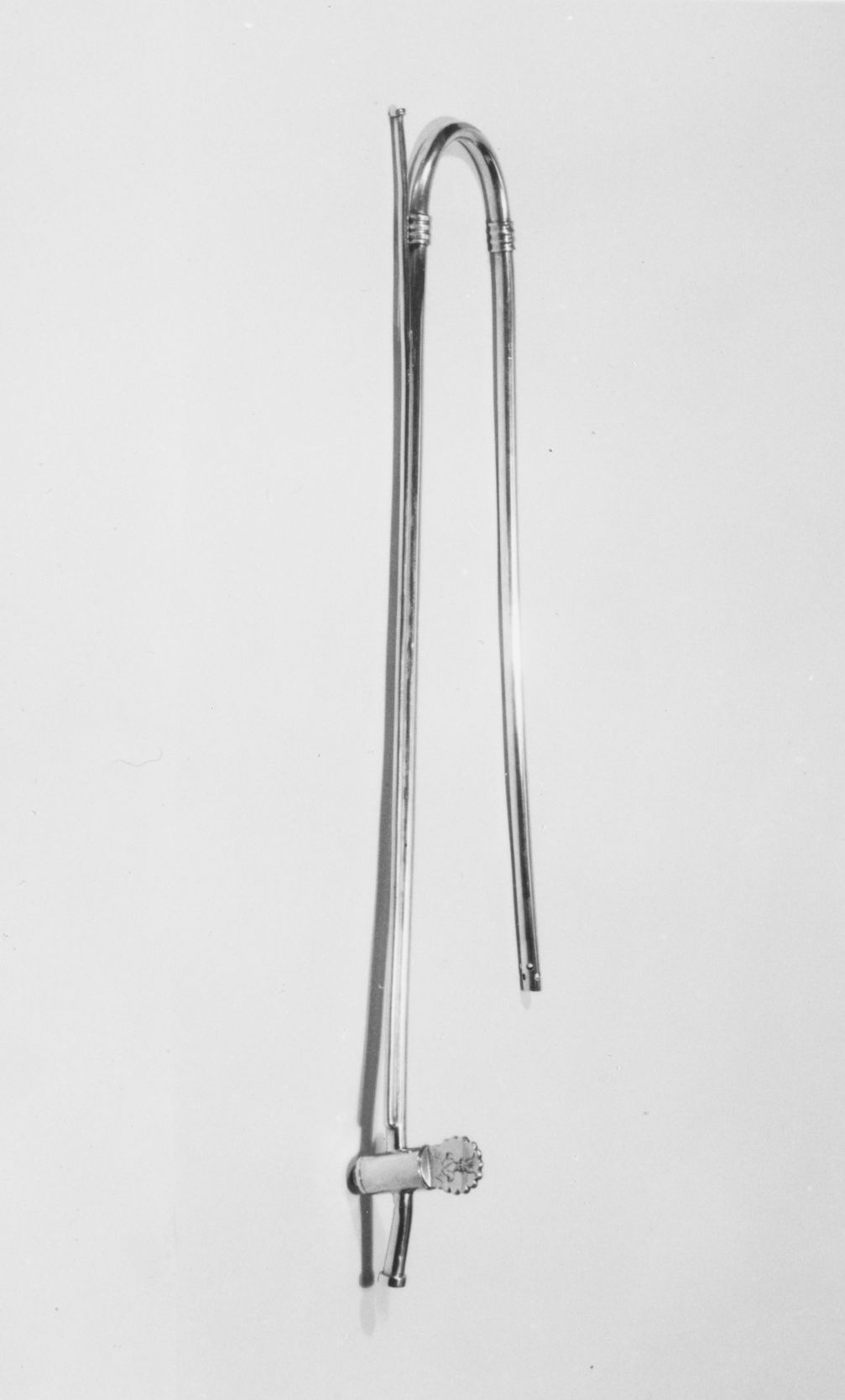
Marquand and Company wine siphoning tube (1830–1838). Collection of the Metropolitan Museum of Art.

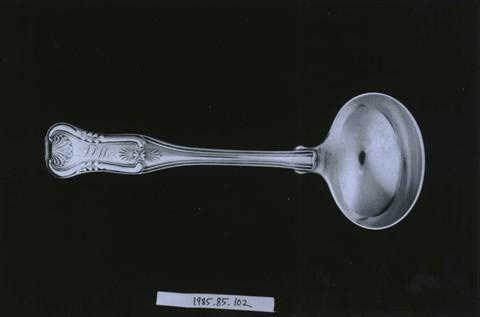
Marquand and Company ladle (1830–1838). In the collection of the Yale University Art Gallery.
