= Marquardt =

Marquardt is a surname of German origin. Notable people with the surname include:

- August F. Marquardt (1850–1925), American politician
- Bridget Marquardt (born 1973), American television personality, glamour model, and actress
- Christel Marquardt (fl. from 1974), American jurist from Kansas
- Christiane Marquardt (born 1958), East German sprinter
- Darcy Marquardt (born 1979), Canadian rower
- David Marquardt (born 1949), venture capitalist
- Donald Marquardt (1929–1997), American statistician
- Elizabeth Marquardt (fl. 2001–2013), author
- Erik Marquardt (born 1987), German politician
- Jens Marquardt (born 1967), German motor sports engineer
- Joachim Marquardt (1812–1882), German historian and writer on Roman antiquities
- Lewis Marquardt (1936–2010), American politician and educator
- Markus Marquardt (born 1970), German operatic baritone
- Mike Marquardt (born 1982), American football player
- Nate Marquardt (born 1979), American mixed martial artist
- Ollie Marquardt (1902–1968), American baseball player
- R. Niels Marquardt (born 1953), American diplomat
- Roy Edward Marquardt (1917–1982), American engineer, inventor of the ramjet, founder of Marquardt Aircraft Co.
- Stephen R. Marquardt (1955–2022), American surgeon

== Companies and enterprises ==
- Marquardt Group, a manufacturing company of electromechanical and electronic switches
- Marquardt Corporation, an aeronautical engineering firm

== Other ==
- Marquardt, a neighbourhood of Potsdam, Germany
  - Marquardt station, its railway station
  - Schloss Marquardt, a castle in this neighbourhood

== See also ==
- Marquardt Slevogt (1909–1980), German ice hockey player
- Marquard (disambiguation)
- Marquart
- Markwart
