= Frederick Marquand =

American silversmith (1799–1882)

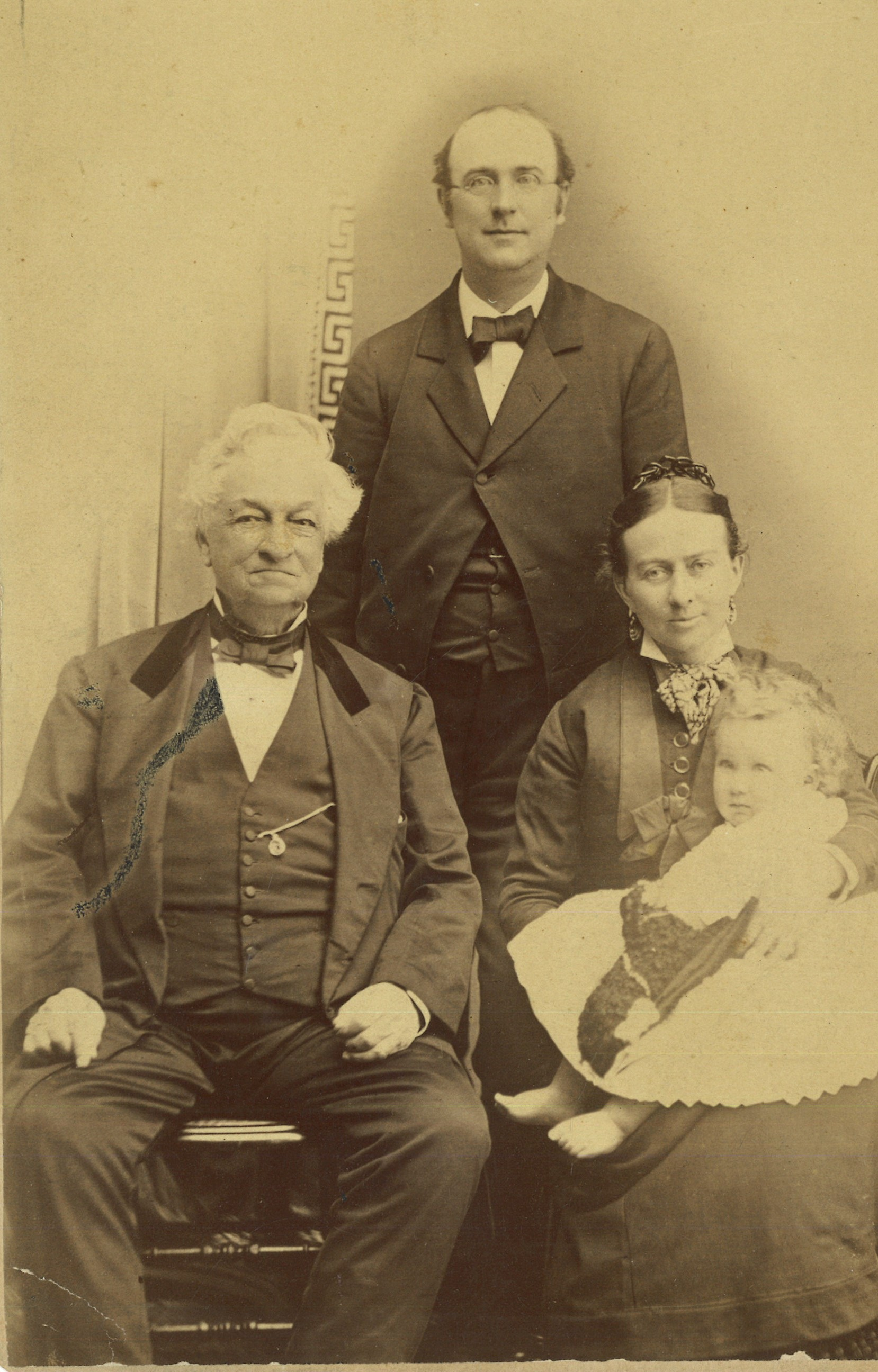
- Marquand (sitting on the left) with his adopted daughter, Virginia, and his son-in-law Elbert Monroe
- Born: April 6, 1799; Fairfield, Connecticut, U.S.
- Died: July 14, 1882 (aged 83); Southport, Connecticut, U.S.
- Occupation: Silversmith
- Parent(s): Isaac Marquand; Mehitable "Mabel" Perry
- Relatives: Henry Gurdon Marquand (brother)

Frederick Marquand (April 6, 1799 – July 14, 1882) was an American silversmith.

== Early life and career ==
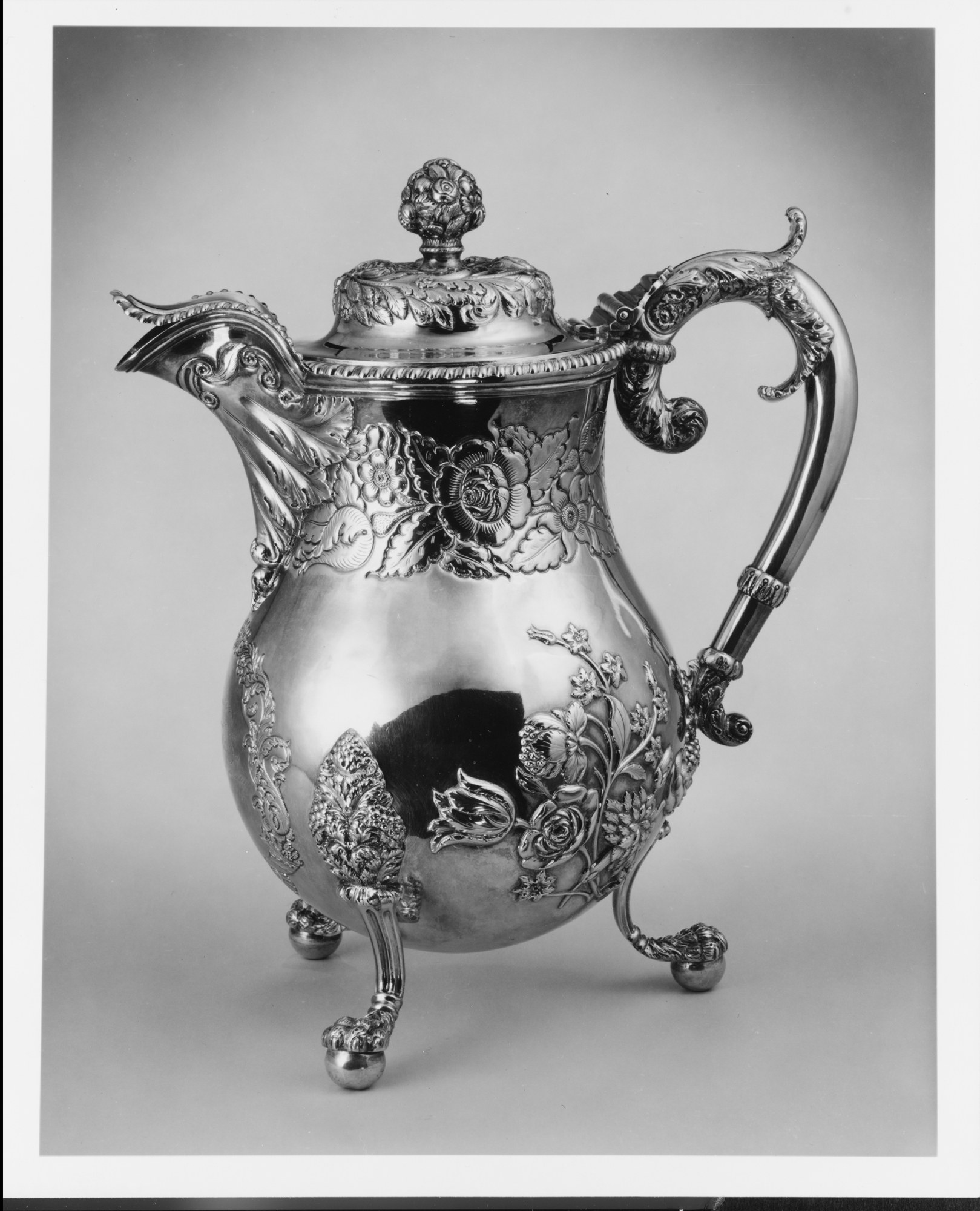
A covered ewer designed by Marquand c. 1827

Marquand was born in 1799 in Fairfield, Connecticut, to Isaac Marquand and Mehitable "Mabel" Perry. He was the second of their eight children, born after Henry and before Gordon, Cornelius, Josiah, Sarah, Julia and Henry. The second Henry, Henry Gurdon Marquand, was born in 1819, a year after the death of the earlier one, aged 21.

His father established Marquand and Co., a silverware firm, in 1804.

In 1820, Marquand moved to Savannah, Georgia, with his cousin, Josiah Penfield, to open their own silversmith trade. However, the two left Savannah in 1824, with Frederick taking over the flourishing Marquand and Co. from his father. The company was headquartered at 166 Broadway, and over time became regarded as "the principal jewelers in the country", as stated in the obituary of Tiffany & Co. secretary Edward C. Moore.

After having been president of Marquand and Company, Marquand sold the business in 1839 to former apprentices William Black and Henry Ball. The firm soon took the name Ball, Black & Co. Frederick took the proceeds from the sale of his business and invested them in New York City real estate and other financial ventures. Marquand retired in 1852.

== Personal life ==
Marquand married Hetty Perry. They adopted a daughter—their niece, Mary Virginia—who married Elbert B. Monroe. Mary founded Pequot Library in Southport, Connecticut, in Marquand's memory.

A scrapbook kept by the Marquands, containing items dating to 1761, was maintained by Frederick until his death. It is now in the possession of Brooklyn Public Library.

Marquand donated the funds for Yale University's Marquand Chapel. He requested unsuccessfully that the name be changed to honor Reverend Dr. Leonard Woolsey Bacon.

== Death ==
Marquand died in 1882 in Southport, aged 83. He outlived all of his siblings except Henry. He was interred in Oak Lawn Cemetery in Fairfield, alongside his wife, who predeceased him by 23 years.

== Gallery ==
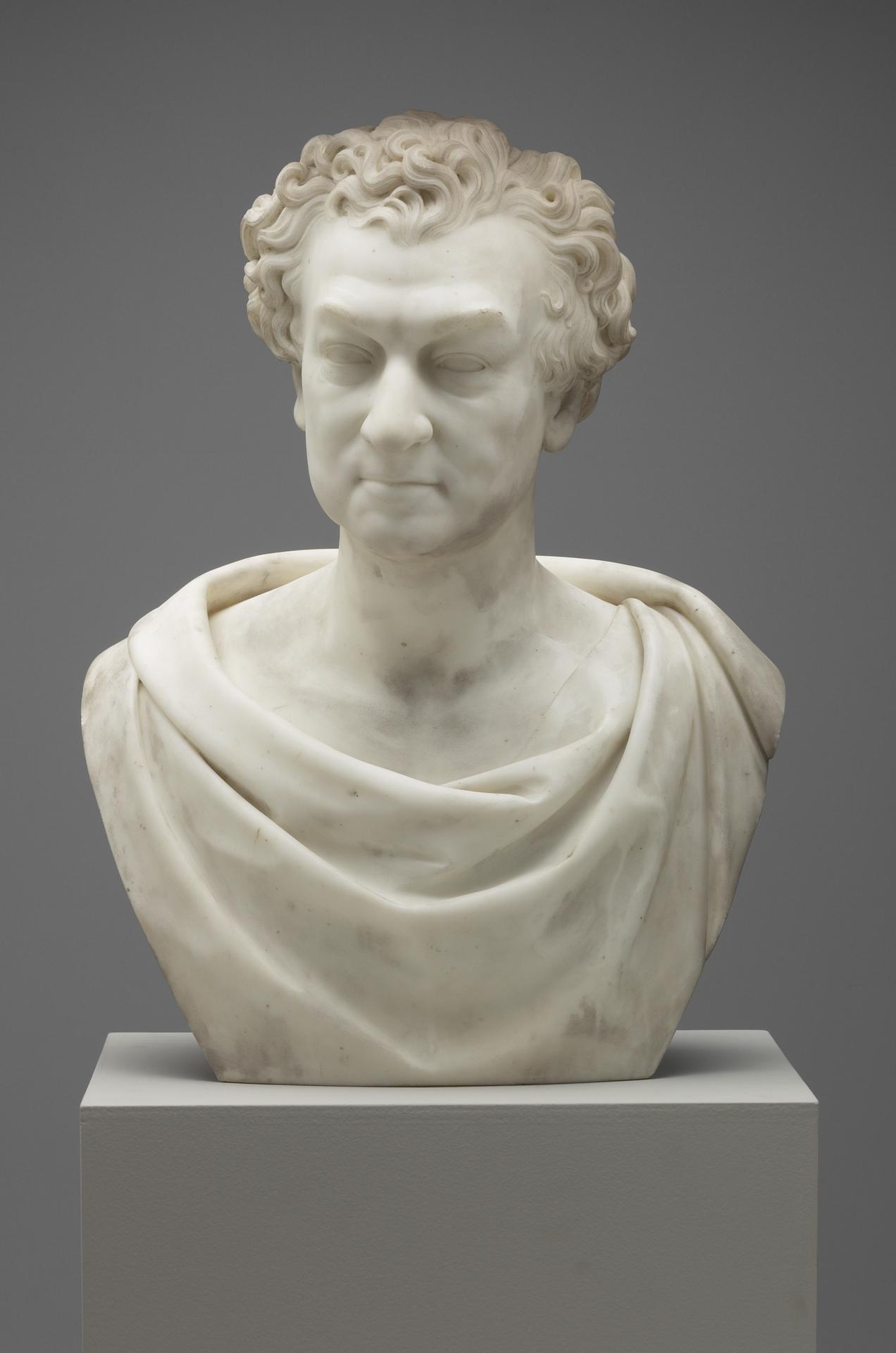
Bust of Frederick Marquand by Edward Sheffield Bartholomew (1856), in the collection of Yale Art Gallery
