= John Chandler Moore =

American silversmith

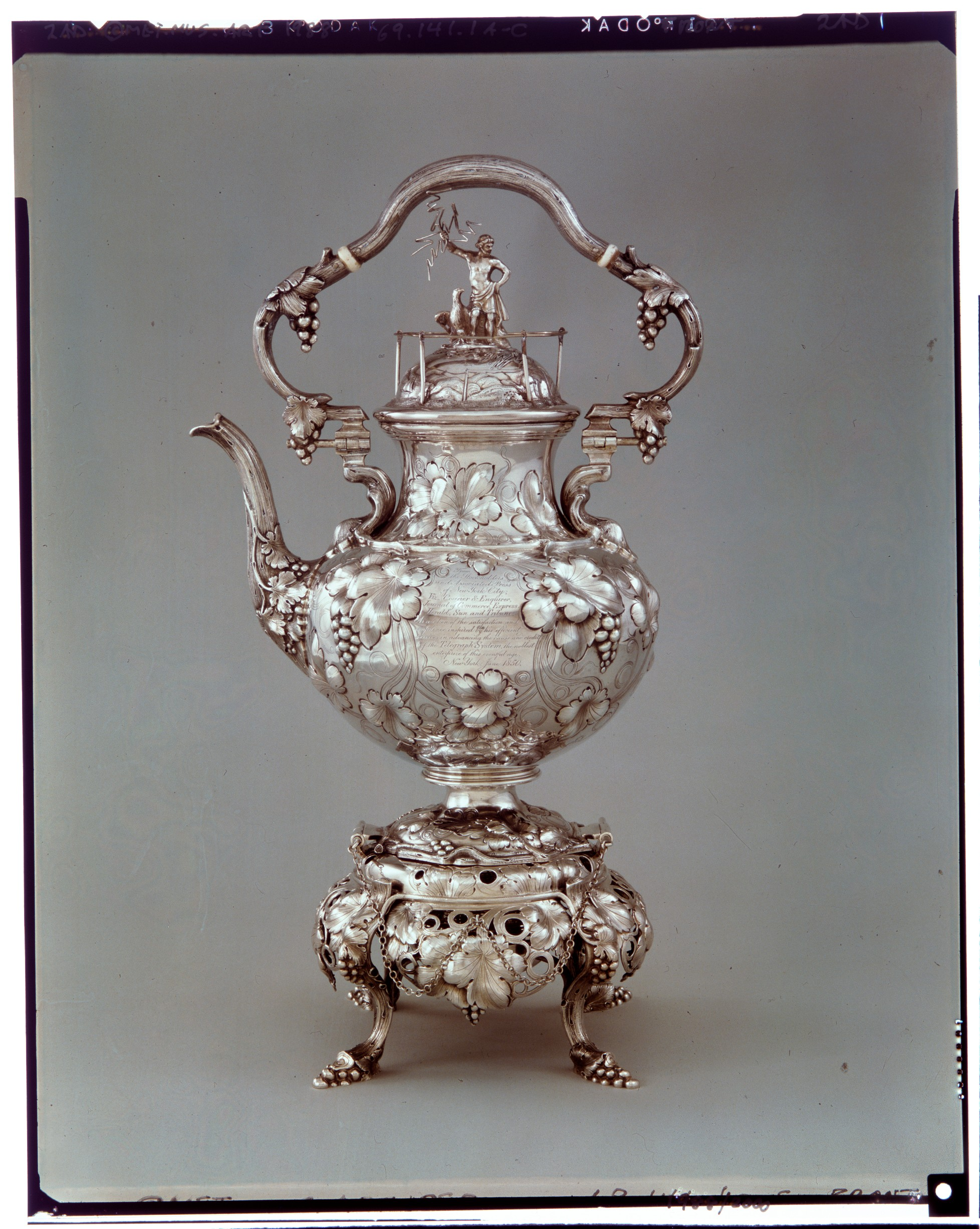
Teakettle by John Chandler Moore, 1850

John Chandler Moore (about 1803 – September 28, 1874) was an American silversmith, active in New York City. While initially working for Marquand and Co., he worked exclusively for Tiffany & Co. after 1851. His son, Edward Chandler Moore, was in charge of designing and manufacturing silverware at Tiffany.

Moore worked from circa 1827 to 1831 as a silversmith in New York City, partnered from 1832 to 1836 with Garrett Eoff as Eoff & Moore, again worked solo from 1837 to 1847, then partnered with his son, Edward Chandler Moore, from circa 1848 to 1855 as J. C. Moore & Son. He sold pieces in the Rococo Revival style, then called the French style, through retailer Ball, Tompkins, and Black (Ball, Black & Co.) In 1851 Tiffany and Co. contracted with the firm to produce holloware exclusively for Tiffany's, in sterling silver (925 parts per 1,000 parts silver) rather than the then-typical American coin silver, and in 1868 the firm was acquired by Tiffany.

Moore was the second American silversmith (after Michael Gibney) to patent silver flatware designs, in 1847 receiving patent numbers 114 (Louis XIV) and 124 (pattern name unknown). One of his notable works was the Collins tea service, made of solid gold, that was displayed at the 1851 Great Exhibition and 1853 Exhibition of the Industry of All Nations.
