= Markwart =

Markwart is a surname. Notable people with this name include:

- Josef Markwart (1864-1930), German historian and orientalist
- Nevin Markwart (born 1964), Canadian ice hockey player
- Ryszard Markwart (1868-1906), Polish nationalis activist

== See also ==
- Variant spellings of the surname:
  - Marquart
  - Marquard
  - Marquardt
