= Jesse Mercer =

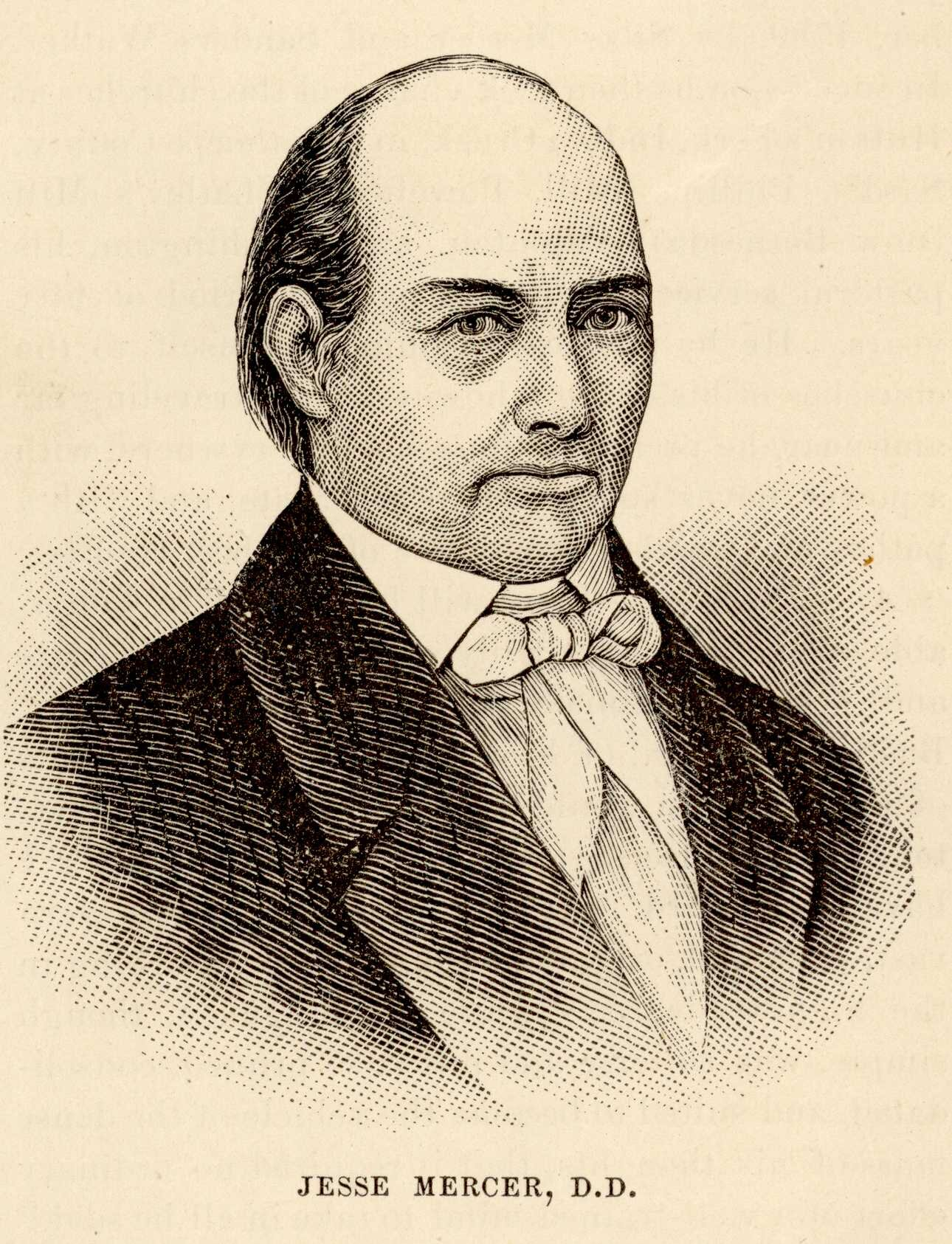

Personal life
- Born: December 16, 1769 Province of North Carolina
- Died: September 6, 1841 (aged 71) Butts County, Georgia
- Known for: Helping found Mercer University

Religious life
- Religion: Protestant Christianity
- Denomination: Baptist
- Founder of: Georgia Baptist Convention
- Profession: Minister
- Ordination: Age 20 (1789)

Senior posting
- Post: President Georgia Baptist Convention
- Period in office: 1822–1841

Jesse Mercer (1769–1841) was an American Baptist minister and eponym of Mercer University in the U.S. state of Georgia.

== Early life ==
Born in the Province of North Carolina on December 16, 1769, he was the son of Silas Mercer, a Baptist minister who moved his family to Wilkes County, Georgia, in the early 1770s. Silas Mercer founded several pioneer churches and convinced his son to follow him into the ministry.

== Entering the ministry ==
Jesse Mercer was baptized by his father at the age of 17, married Sabrina Chivers of Wilkes County at age 19, and was formally ordained into the ministry at age 20. Sardis Church, originally called Hutton's Fork, was his first charge. In 1796, Mercer succeeded his father as pastor of the Phillips' Mill Church, which he served for 37 years. He also served as pastor of Bethesda Church (1796-1827), Powell's Creek Church, in Hancock County, Georgia (1797-1825), and the Baptist Church at Eatonton, Putnam County, Georgia (1820–26). In 1798, as a delegate to one of Georgia’s constitutional conventions, he wrote the section of the state constitution that secures religious liberty. Mercer was president of the Georgia Baptist Convention for 19 years, from its founding in 1822 until his death in 1841.

== Marriages ==
Mercer's first wife died on September 23, 1826. He then moved to Washington, Georgia, and in December 1827 married Nancy Simons, a wealthy widow who joined him in making large gifts to Mercer Institute, a boys' manual labor school organized by the Georgia Baptist Convention in Penfield, Georgia. Mercer provided a founding endowment and served as the first chairman of the school's board of trustees. In return, the school was named in his honor. The institute was renamed Mercer University in 1838 after the Georgia General Assembly granted a university charter.

== Published works ==
Mercer published a popular hymnal titled Cluster of Spiritual Songs in 1810. In later years, he also published the Christian Index, which became the newspaper of the Georgia Baptist Convention. Mercer published a temperance newspaper in Washington, Georgia, though he at first was against the temperance movement. In 1811 he wrote the circular letter for the Georgia Baptist Association in which he defended the Baptist rejection of alien immersion (immersions performed in non-Baptist churches) on the basis of Baptist successionism. In 1828, Mercer became the first pastor of Washington Baptist Church where he served until his death. Mercer died in 1841 and is buried in Penfield Cemetery, Penfield, Georgia.

== Bibliography ==
- Anthony L. Chute (2011). Father Mercer: The Story of a Baptist Statesman. Mercer University Press. ISBN 978-0-88146-262-3.
- Anthony L. Chute (2005). A Piety Above the Common Standard: Jesse Mercer and the Defense of Evangelistic Calvinism. Mercer University Press. ISBN 978-0-86554-984-5.
- Charles Dutton Mallary (1844). Memoirs of Elder Jesse Mercer. J. Gray.
- Jesse Mercer (1871). The Cluster of Spiritual Songs, Divine Hymns, and Sacred Poems (5 ed.).
- "Obituary". 22. Baptist Missionary Magazine. 1842: 19.
