= Marquart =

Marquart is a surname. Notable people with the surname include:

- Josef Markwart (1864–1930) also known as Josef Marquart, German historian and orientalist
- Johannes Marquart (1909–?), German actuarial mathematician and cryptanalyst
- Kyle Marquart, American politician
- Ludwig Clamor Marquart (1804–1881), German pharmacist and entrepreneur
- Michael Marquart, American musician
- Paul Marquart (born 1957), American politician
- William Marquart (1915–1960), Canadian boxer

== See also ==
- Variant spellings of the surname:
  - Marquard (disambiguation)
  - Marquardt
  - Markwart
