= Penfield, Georgia =

Coordinates: 33°40′02″N 83°10′39″W

Penfield, Georgia, United States was established shortly after 1829 in Greene County, and named in honor of Josiah Penfield (1785–1828), a Savannah merchant and silversmith from Fairfield, Connecticut, who bequeathed $2,500 and a financial challenge to the Georgia Baptist Convention to match his gift for educational purposes. The convention, led by Billington Sanders, organized a manual labor school which opened in 1833 as Mercer Institute (renamed Mercer University in 1837), in honor of Rev. Jesse Mercer of Greene County, a major contributor to the matching gift request.

As the university grew, a Female Academy (1838), post office, bank, mercantile stores, print shops, Male Academy Preparatory School (1847), hosiery mill, and cotton warehouses opened on the 450 areas that surrounded the campus. Residential housing, influenced by the requirement that homes provide housing for students, added to the charm of this typical southern community.

Before long, the Christian Index, Temperance Banner, Georgia Illustrated Magazine and The Orion were all being published in Penfield. Hard times brought on by the American Civil War, however, initiated the school's move to Macon in 1871, and the village of Penfield survived on the strength of the cotton industry.

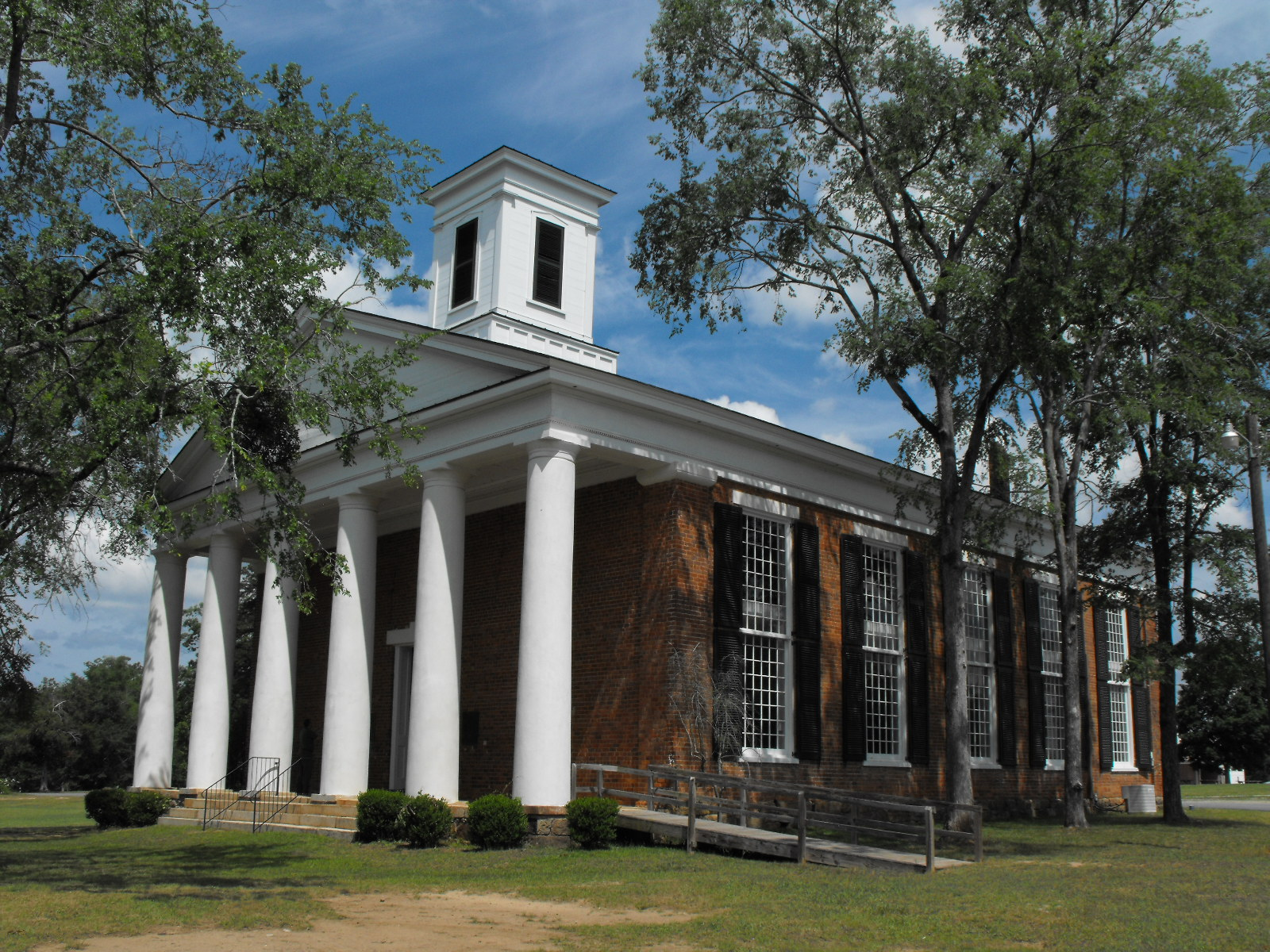
Old Mercer Chapel, built by David Demarest in 1845, now the Penfield Baptist Church

Today, the village of Penfield is distinguished by the Greek Revival architecture of Old Mercer Chapel, community churches, town cemetery, and Victorian homes that flourished until 1919 when the prosperity built during the "cotton era" was ended by the boll weevil.

Ruins of the town's mercantile buildings, bank, post office and Mercer Institute's (science building, dormitory, Phi Delta Literary Society Hall, Ciceronian Hall and others) can be seen next to the still-functioning chapel located just above the old town square along East Main Street. Penfield Cemetery, located a short distance from Penfield Road, on the North end of Cemetery Road, holds the remains of many community leaders. One is noted Baptist minister Jesse Mercer, namesake of the university. Another is (Frances) Etta Colclough Whelchel, a member of the first class of women to graduate from the University of Georgia, who was instrumental in founding the university's first YWCA branch and served as its first president, and later ran the Colclough family's Penfield farm.

In 1976, the village of Penfield was added to the National Register of Historic Places in recognition of its contributions to architecture, education and religion from 1825 to 1874. The area now known as the Penfield Historic District comprises 305 acres (1.2 km^{2}), including Old Mercer Chapel (now Penfield Baptist Church), Sanders Chapel, Penfield Presbyterian Church, Penfield Cemetery and over a dozen notable houses. Behind the wall of the Penfield Cemetery lies a slave cemetery. There are some markers still standing, mostly indentations on the ground. The road to it has been blocked.

The Penfield Historic District is located seven miles (11 km) north of Greensboro on GA 5925 (commonly known as Penfield Road).
