= Stephen R. Marquardt =

American surgeon

- Born: Southern California
- Education: University of California; Loma Linda University
- Occupations: Physician, surgeon

Stephen R. Marquardt is an American surgeon born and raised in Southern California. He received his medical degree from UCLA and completed his residency on Oral and Maxillofacial surgery at the UCLA Medical Center. His university appointments have included Assistant Research Oral Surgeon and Chief of Facial Imaging at UCLA, and professorships at Loma Linda University as well as the University of Southern California.

He retired from active surgical practice after 27 years and currently conducts his research on human attractiveness in Orange County, California. Marquardt is an active member of the Societies of Maxillofacial Surgeons.

He is known for the "Marquardt face mask" or "repose frontal mask", a drawing which is said to represent the proportions of an ideal human face and which makes use of the golden ratio.

== See also ==
Physical attractiveness
