= Marquard (disambiguation) =

Marquard is a small farming town in South Africa.

Marquard may also refer to:

== Surname ==
- Jürg Marquard (born 1945), Swiss journalist and businessman
- Odo Marquard (1928–2015), German philosopher
- Rube Marquard (1886–1980), American pitcher in Major League Baseball
- Urania Marquard Olsen (1856–1932), Danish-Norwegian actress and theatre director

== Given name ==
- Marquard Bohm (1941–2006), German actor
- Marquard Gude (1635–1689), German archaeologist and classical scholar
- Marquard Herrgott (1694–1762), German Benedictine historian and diplomat
- Marquard Schwarz (1887–1968), American freestyle swimmer
- Marquard Sebastian von Schenk von Stauffenberg (1644–1693), Prince-Bishop of Bamberg

== Single name ==
- Marquard of Randeck (1296–1381), Patriarch of Aquileia
- Marquard von Berg (1528–1591), Prince-Bishop of Augsburg
- Marquard von Salzbach (d.1410), Teutonic Knight

== See also ==
- Marquand (disambiguation)
- Variant spellings of the surname Marquard:
  - Marquart
  - Marquardt
  - Markwart
