= Edward Chandler Moore =

American silversmith and art collector

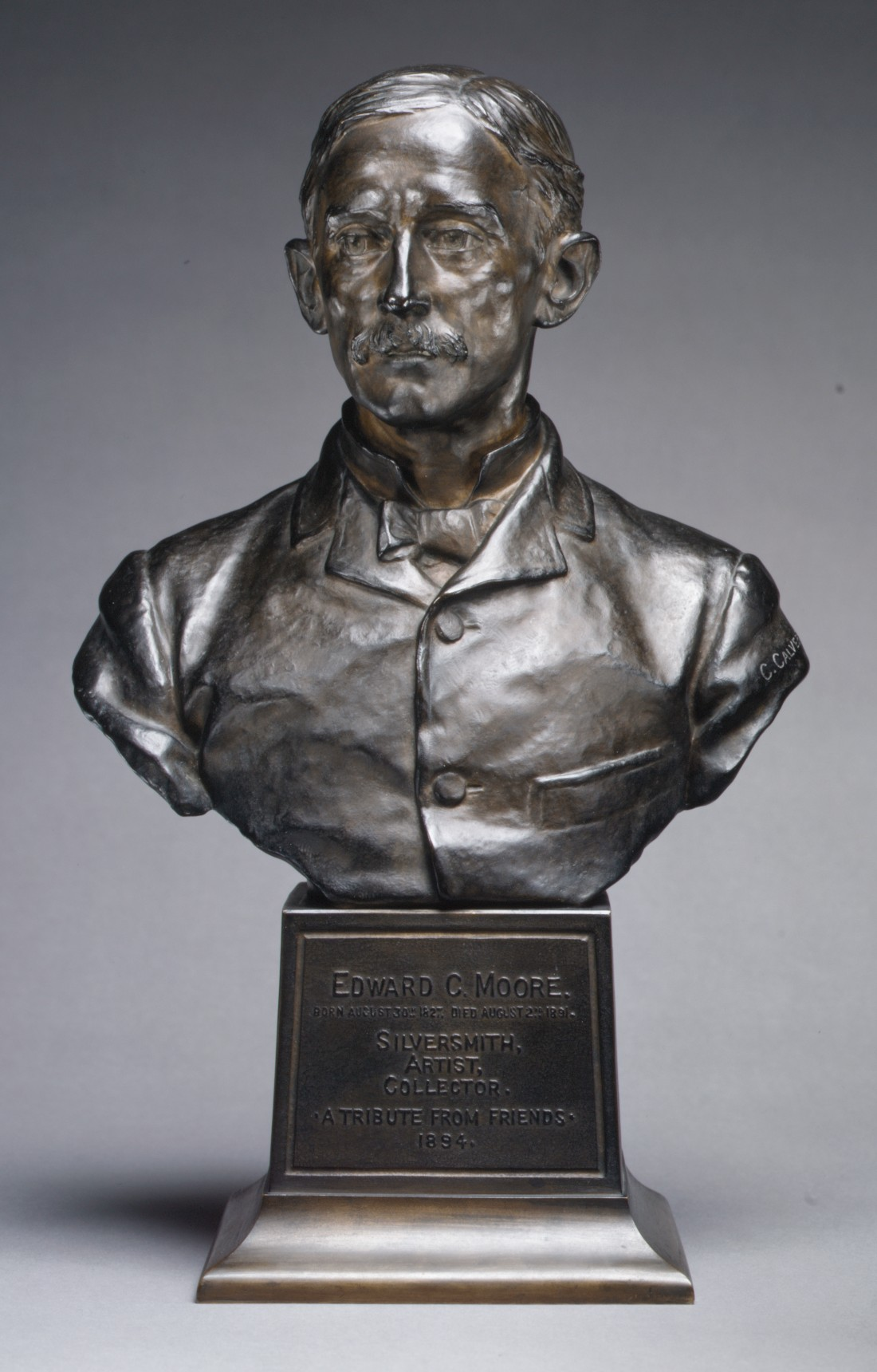
Edward C. Moore by Charles Calverley, 1894

Edward Chandler Moore (August 30, 1827 – August 2, 1891) was an American silversmith, art collector, and benefactor of the Metropolitan Museum of Art.

== Early life ==
Moore was born in New York City where his father, John Chandler Moore, was a silversmith, and learned his craft in his father's shop. From 1848 to 1851 he was a partner in the business, and when his father retired, Moore inherited the business.

== Career ==
Moore entered an exclusive contract with Tiffany & Co. under which he would work exclusively for Tiffany's as an independent, outside craftsman. In 1868 he joined the firm, working as the firm's chief silver designer until his death 1891. Moore made many improvements in manufacturing processes, adding flatware to Tiffany's silver catalog in 1869.

He won a gold medal at the Exposition Universelle in 1867 for his exhibit of silverware, another medal at the Centennial Exposition in 1876, and a special gold medal in 1878 in Paris. In 1889 he was awarded the Legion of Honor.

== Art collection ==
Moore amassed a collection of art, with a focus on art from Japan, the Islamic world and ancient Greece and Rome.

His collection contains somewhere between 1,600 and 1,700 pieces. He first began to study objects to help inform his designs, and subsequently began to collect them. At one time he devoted his attention to Japanese and Chinese porcelains, and later old Persian wares. Over time he became interested in old glass and lusterware porcelains which now form an especially rich part of the collection. His collection includes antique Roman, Cyprian, Etruscan, Merovingian, Venetian, Persian, Arab, German, and Spanish glass; Chinese, Japanese, Korean, Hispano-Moresque, Rhodian, Damascus, and Persian ceramics; Persian, Turkish, and Indian metalwork, including Saracenic metal work of the twelfth and thirteenth centuries, as well as Chinese and Japanese bronzes, swords and sword-guards; Japanese inro, netsuke, lacquer ware, and wood and ivory carvings; and Oriental jewelry, Persian lacquer, antique French and Venetian inlaid straw work, and a fine collection of Tanagra figurines.

He bequeathed many objects from his collection to New York's Metropolitan Museum of Art.

The Metropolitan Museum of Art hosted an exhibition of Moore's work in 2020, describing Moore as "the creative force who led Tiffany & Co. to unparalleled originality and success during the second half of the nineteenth century." In 2024, the Museum exhibited Collecting Inspiration: Edward C. Moore at Tiffany & Co., an exhibit that paired works designed under his direction with those of his collection. The exhibit was accompanied by a catalog by Medill Higgins Harvey (ISBN 978-1-588-39690-7)

He died in his summer house at Hastings-on-Hudson, New York.
