= Isaac Marquand =

American silversmith (1766–1838)

- Born: March 10, 1766; Fairfield, Connecticut, U.S.
- Died: November 24, 1838 (aged 72); Brooklyn, New York, U.S.
- Occupations: Silversmith, clockmaker
- Relatives: Frederick Marquand (son); Henry Gurdon Marquand (son); Josiah Penfield (nephew)

Isaac Marquand (March 10, 1766 – November 24, 1838) was an American silversmith and clockmaker.

== Early life and career ==
Marquand was born in 1766 in Fairfield, Connecticut, to Henry Marquand and Lucretia Jennings Redfield. His father's family emigrated from Guernsey five years previously. His father died when Isaac was six.

In 1787, aged 21, Marquand was in a clockmakers' partnership with Gamaliel Bradford Whiting in Fairfield. He moved shortly thereafter to Edenton, North Carolina, where he worked as a goldsmith, silversmith, watchmaker and clockmaker on Broad Street until 1796.

Between 1801 and 1810, Marquand was living and working in Savannah, Georgia, in partnership with his son, Cornelius. Hezekiah Lord later joined, as did his nephew, Josiah Penfield. He also spent large amounts of time at their office in New York City, at 183 Front Street, where Orlando Harriman also worked. Between 1815 and 1823, Marquand was in partnership with Erastus Barton, as E. Barton & Co., at 166 Broadway.

He established Marquand and Co., a silverware firm, in 1804. In 1824, his son, Frederick, took over the flourishing company, which was headquartered at 166 Broadway, and over time became regarded as "the principal jewelers in the country", as stated in the obituary of Tiffany and Co. secretary Edward C. Moore. Marquand's brother, Henry, joined as a partner in the mid-1830s. The business moved to 181 Broadway in 1833. The business was renamed Ball, Tompkins & Black in 1839, a year after the brothers sold the firm.

== Personal life ==
In 1796, Marquand married fellow Fairfield native Mehitable "Mabel" Perry, with whom he had eight children: Henry, Frederick, Gordon, Cornelius, Josiah, Sarah, Julia and Henry. The second Henry, Henry Gurdon Marquand, was born in 1819, a year after the death of the earlier one, aged 21.

== Death ==
Marquand died in 1838 in Brooklyn, New York, aged 72. He was interred in Oak Lawn Cemetery in Fairfield, alongside his wife, who survived him by 17 years.
