= Henry Gurdon Marquand =

American financier, philanthropist and art collector

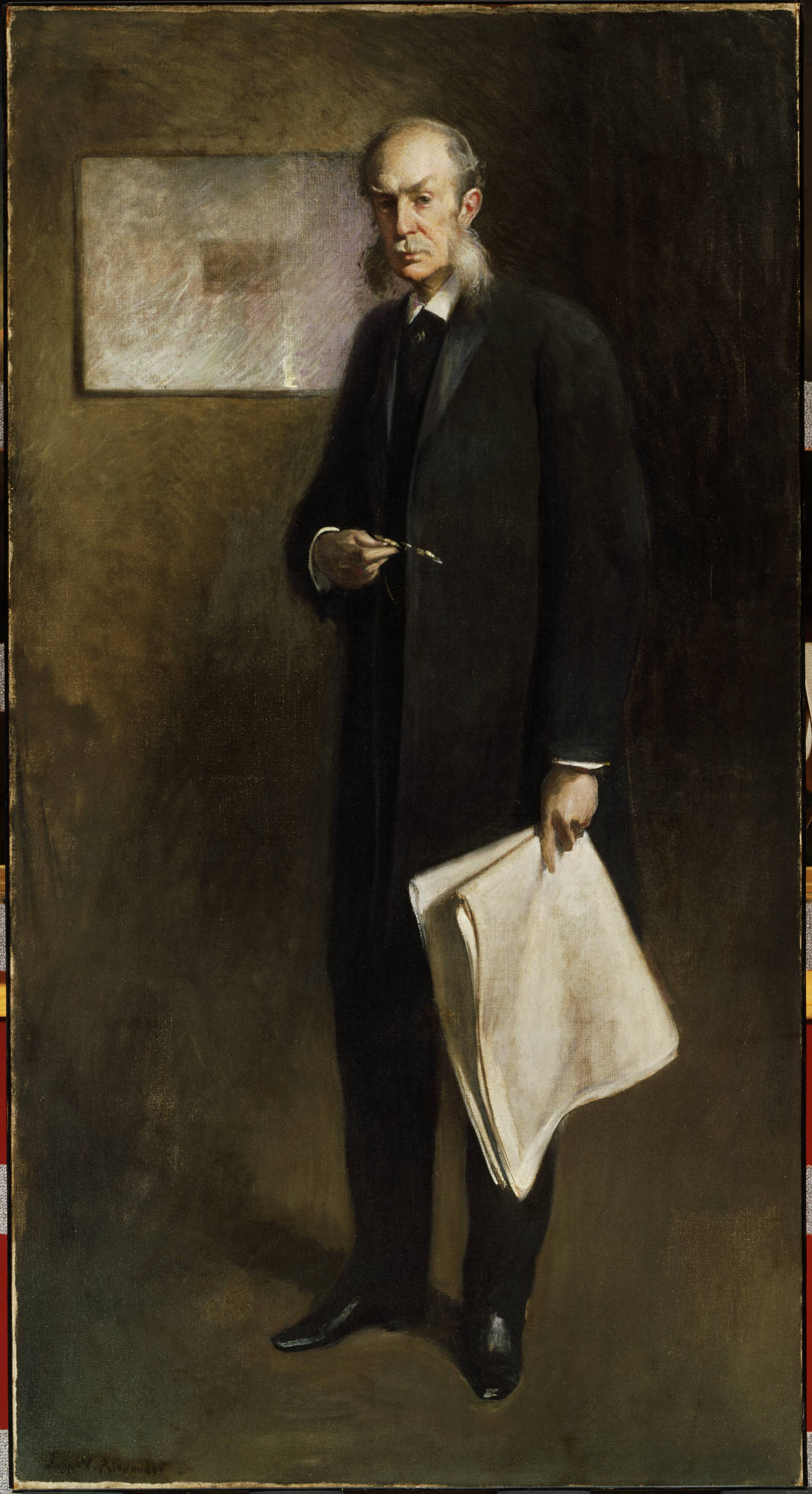
- John White Alexander, Henry G. Marquand, 1896, in the Princeton University Art Museum
- Born: April 11, 1819; New York City
- Died: February 26, 1902 (aged 82); New York City
- Occupation: Financier
- Known for: Philanthropy to Princeton University and Metropolitan Museum of Art, Marquand Collection
- Spouse: Elizabeth Allen Allen (m. 1851; died 1895)
- Children: 6, including Allan Marquand
- Parent(s): Isaac Marquand; Mehitable "Mabel" Perry
- Relatives: Frederick Marquand (brother) Adam Hochschild (great-grandson)

Henry Gurdon Marquand (April 11, 1819 – February 26, 1902) was an American financier, philanthropist and art collector known for his extensive collection.

== Early life ==
Marquand was born in New York City on April 11, 1819, not long after the death of his brother Henry Marquand in Havana, Cuba, in October 1818. He was the second youngest of the eleven children of Mehitable "Mabel" (née Perry) Marquand (1778–1855) and silversmith Isaac Marquand (1766–1838), whose family immigrated from Guernsey, one of the Channel Islands. Among his other siblings were Frederick Marquand, Cornelius Paulding Marquand, Josiah Penfield Marquand, Sarah Elizabeth (née Marquand) Trask, and Julia Perry Marquand.

At the age of fifteen, Henry began working for his family's prestigious jewelry business, Marquand & Co. At the time, the business was headed by his older brother Frederick, a liberal benefactor of Yale College and Union Theological Seminary.

== Career ==
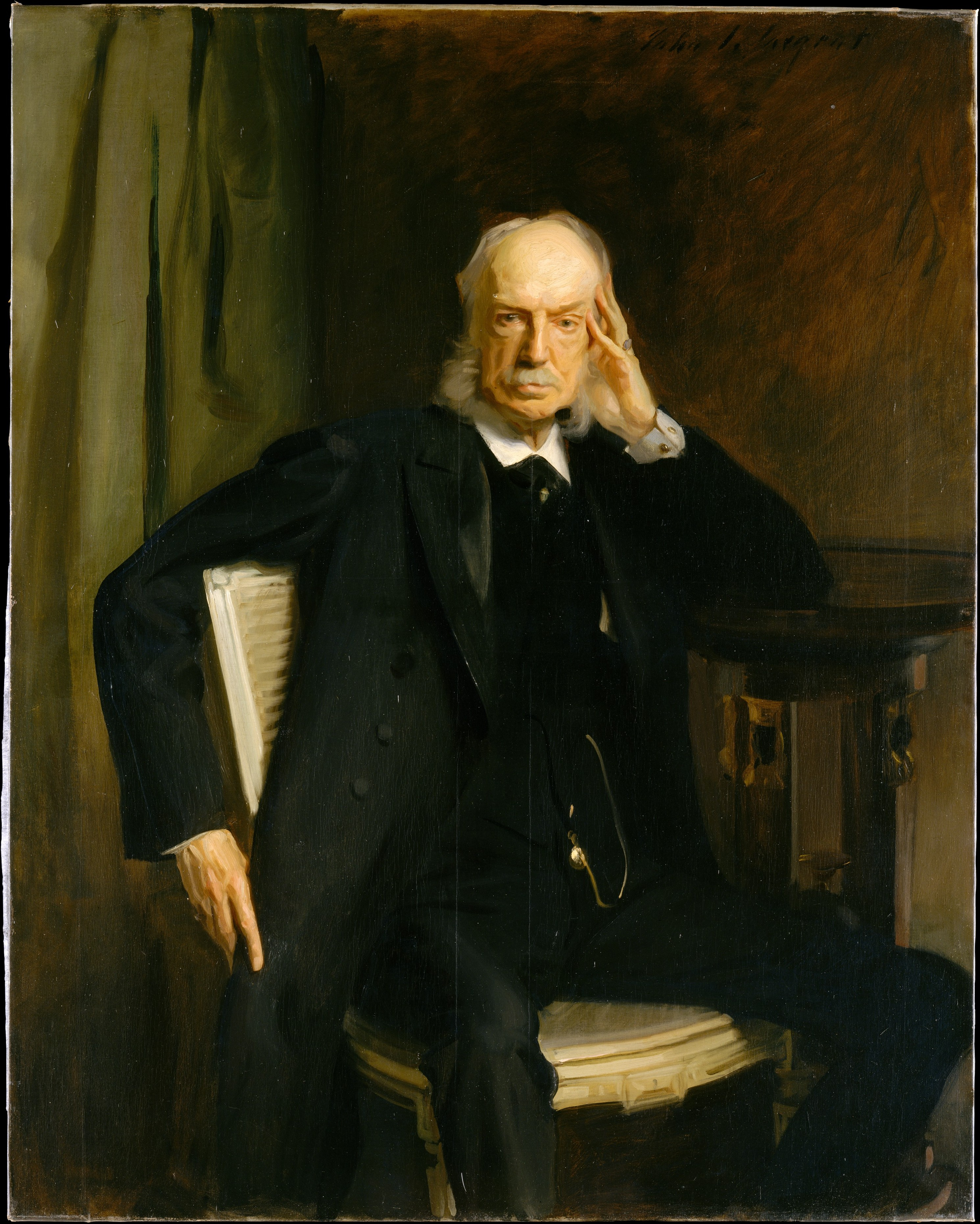
Portrait of Marquand, by John Singer Sargent, 1897

Following the death of their father in 1838, Frederick sold the business, which was then renamed Ball, Tompkins & Black, and took up real estate investment and other financial ventures, and Henry was his brother's agent. After selling the company, Frederick later became instrumental in the establishment of Southport's Pequot Library, a special collections institution. Henry established himself as a banker on Wall Street, became Director of the Equitable Life Insurance Company, and eventually made a fortune speculating on foreign currency exchange and railroads. In 1867, Henry and his brother-in-law, Thomas Allen, bought a chief interest in the St. Louis, Iron Mountain and Southern Railway which ran from St. Louis to southeast Missouri and to Arkansas and Texas. The two were ultimately pushed out of their investment by Jay Gould, whose monopoly on the southwestern railroad system forced them to sell. With a profit of one million dollars, Marquand effectively retired from the business world in 1880 and focused his energies on the acquisition of art and the management of the fledgling Metropolitan Museum of Art.

=== Philanthropy and art collection ===
Marquand was a member of the Provisional Committee of fifty men assembled in 1869 to establish a museum of art in New York City. As a member of the building committee and president of the museum's board of trustees, he witnessed the physical growth of the Metropolitan Museum of Art from various temporary quarters to its permanent home on the eastern edge of Central Park. Marquand, a personal friend and client of museum architect Richard Morris Hunt, was in large part responsible for the realization of the project to extend and reorient the distinctive Beaux-Arts façade entrance east to Fifth Avenue, pushing for the plans to be carried out by Hunt's son (Richard Howland Hunt) after the death of the renowned architect. He was also the first honorary member of the American Institute of Architects. Marquand was also a significant contributor to the museum's collection, particularly in the area of European paintings. This donation included, among other old master works, Johannes Vermeer's Woman with a Water Jug, the first Vermeer to enter a United States collection and which scholars now agree is one of only thirty-seven known works by the artist.

Marquand was also a benefactor of the Metropolitan Museum of Art Schools and Princeton University, donating funds for the creation of the Bonner-Marquand Gymnasium and the Marquand Chapel (the latter designed by Richard Morris Hunt).

== Personal life ==
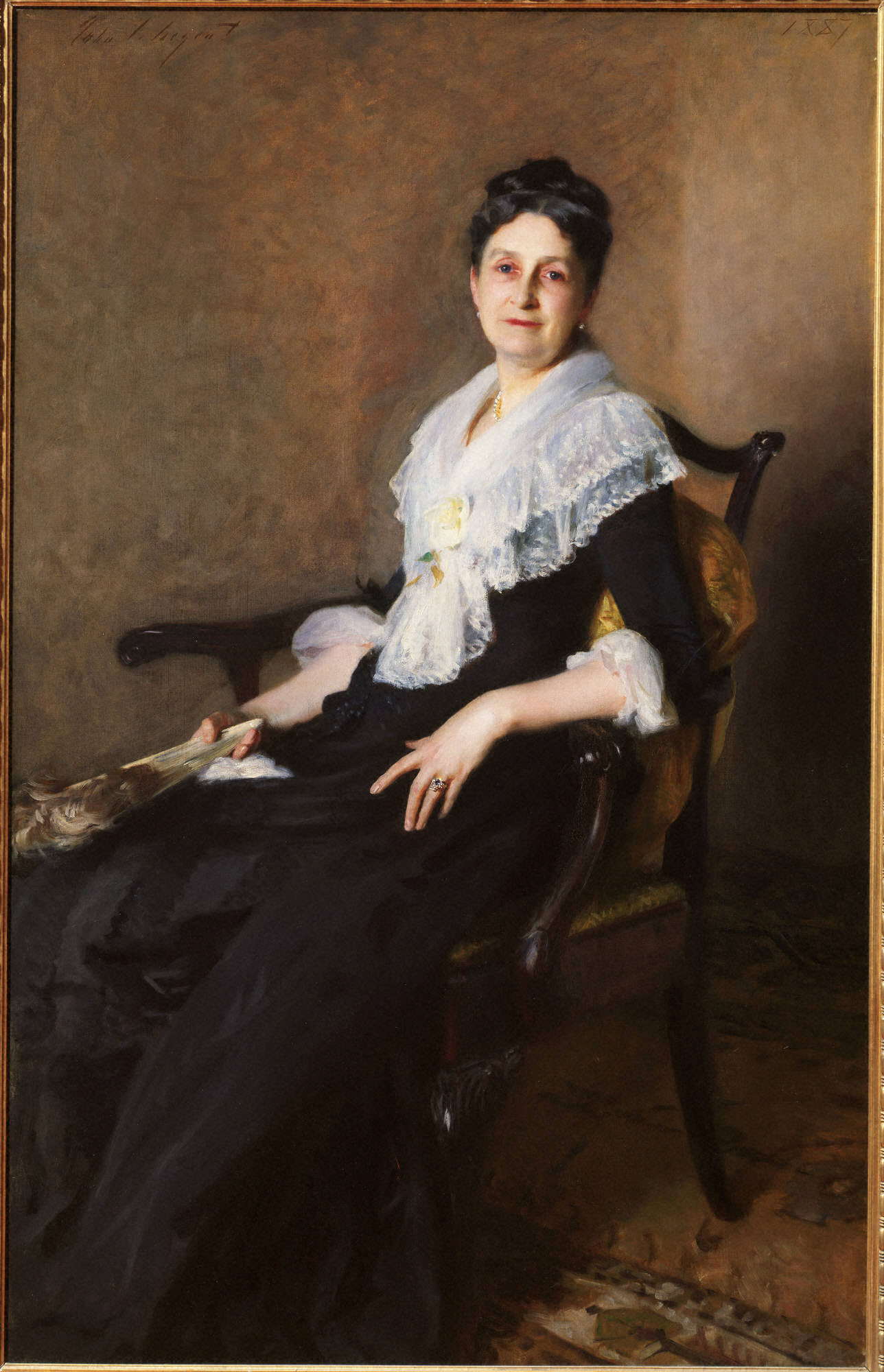
Portrait of his wife, Elizabeth Allen Marquand, by John Singer Sargent, 1887

On May 20, 1851, Marquand was married to Elizabeth Love Allen. She was a daughter of Jonathan Allen and Eunice Williams (née Larner) Allen of Pittsfield, Massachusetts. Together, they were the parents of six children, including:

- Linda Marquand (1852–1931), who married the Rev. Dr. Roderick Terry, son of banker John T. Terry.
- Allan Marquand (1853–1924), who graduated from Princeton in 1874 and became professor of archaeology and art in 1883; he married Eleanor Cross, daughter of Richard James Cross, in 1896.
- Frederic Alexander Marquand (1855–1885), a who married Alice Ogston, daughter of George William Ogston. After his death, she married Graeme Harrison.
- Henry Marquand (1857–1921), a banker who married Katherine Cowdin, a daughter of New York State Assemblyman Elliot Cowdin.
- Mabel Marquand (1860–1896), who married Justice Henry Galbraith Ward, in 1891.
- Elizabeth Love Marquand (1862–1951), who married Harold Godwin, a son of journalist Parke Godwin; she founded the Roslyn District Nursing Association.

He was a member of the Century Association, the Metropolitan Club, the Grolier Club and Princeton Club.

His wife Elizabeth died of pneumonia at their home in Manhattan on February 3, 1895. Marquand died on February 26, 1902, in New York City at the age of 82. His varied, and valuable art collection and rare books were sold in 1903. He was a significant financial benefactor of The Metropolitan Museum of Art, Princeton University, and other institutions. His son, Allan Marquand (b. 1853), graduated from Princeton in 1874, and in 1883 became professor of archaeology and art.

== Residences ==
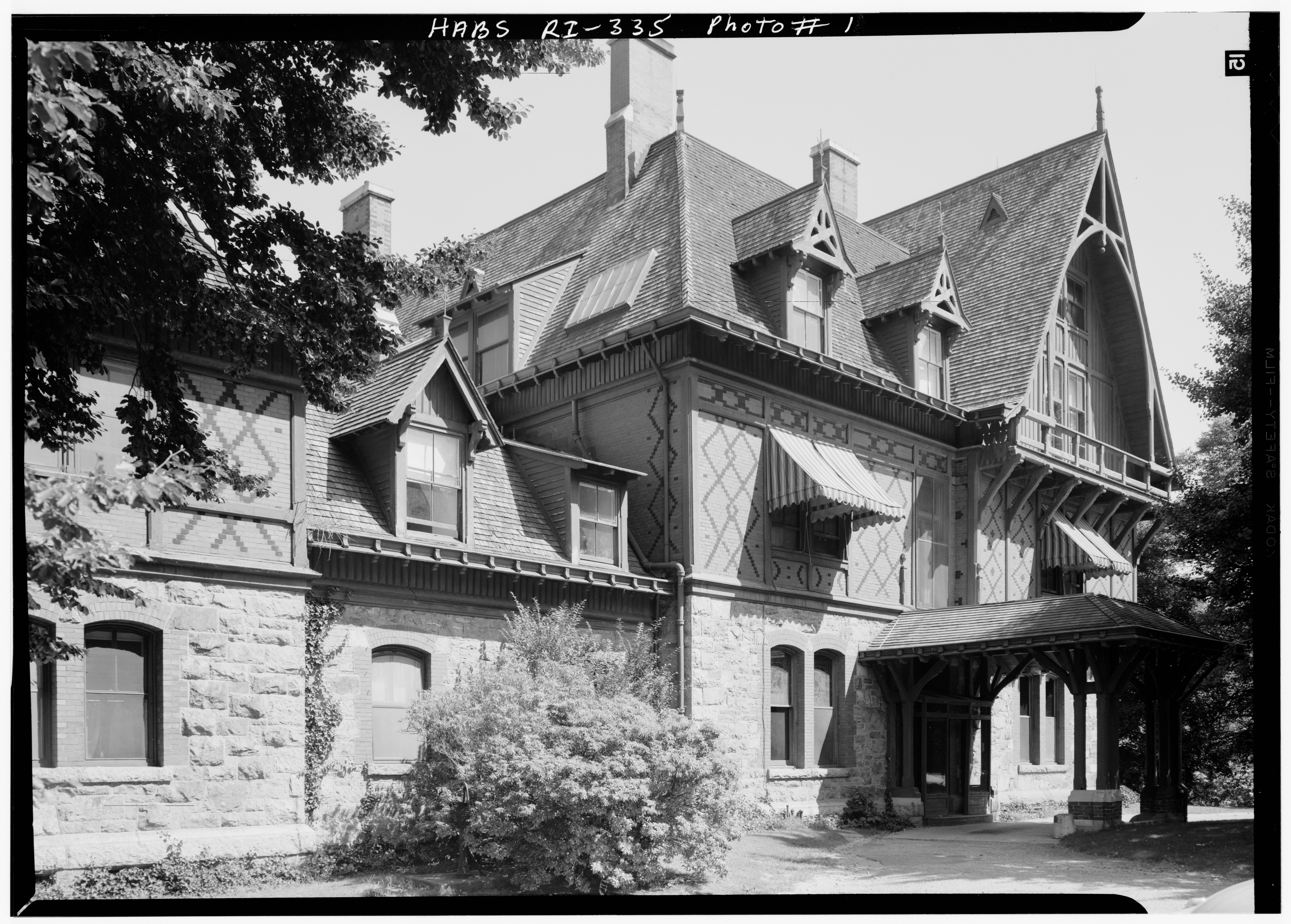
Linden Gate, Marquand's home in Newport.

=== Newport ===
In the early 1870s, Marquand hired Richard Morris Hunt to design and build a home for him in Newport, Rhode Island, which became known as Linden Gate, on the corner of Rhode Island Avenue and Old Beach Road. The elaborate stone, brick and wooden house that featured five red brick fireplaces was built by C.H. Burdick for Marquand between 1872 and 1873 and is representative of Hunt's earlier work. He had bought the property, a parcel that was originally a part of the 'Perry Farm", from Mary Gibbs, widow of George Gibbs for $32,165 in July 1871. Another parcel was bought for $22,000 in June 1876 and a third parcel for $34,000 in April 1881. In 1883, Marquand had Hunt remodel the original interiors together with enlarging the dining room and adding the service wing. He also built a brick lodge at the northeast corner of the estate. In 1913, the music room was added to the east and another entrance was added to the south.

After his death, the estate was purchased by the Rev. Dr. Roderick Terry, husband of his eldest daughter Linda, for $100,000 in December 1914. They were noted for their entertaining in Newport. Both Linda and Roderick died at Linden Gate, and the house was inherited by their son and Marquand's grandson, lawyer Roderick, who owned the home until his death in 1951. It was later divided into an apartment house before being destroyed by a fire in 1973.

=== New York City ===
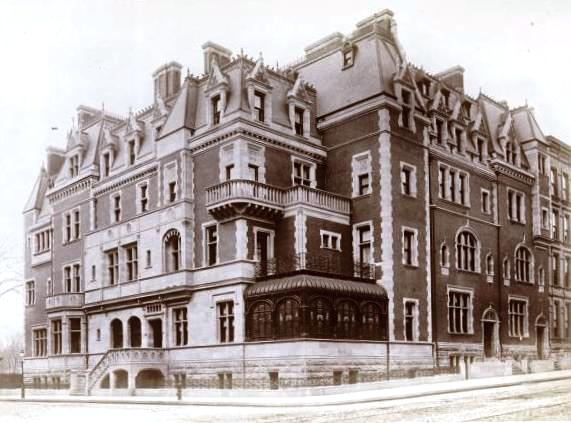
Marquand's house on Madison Avenue

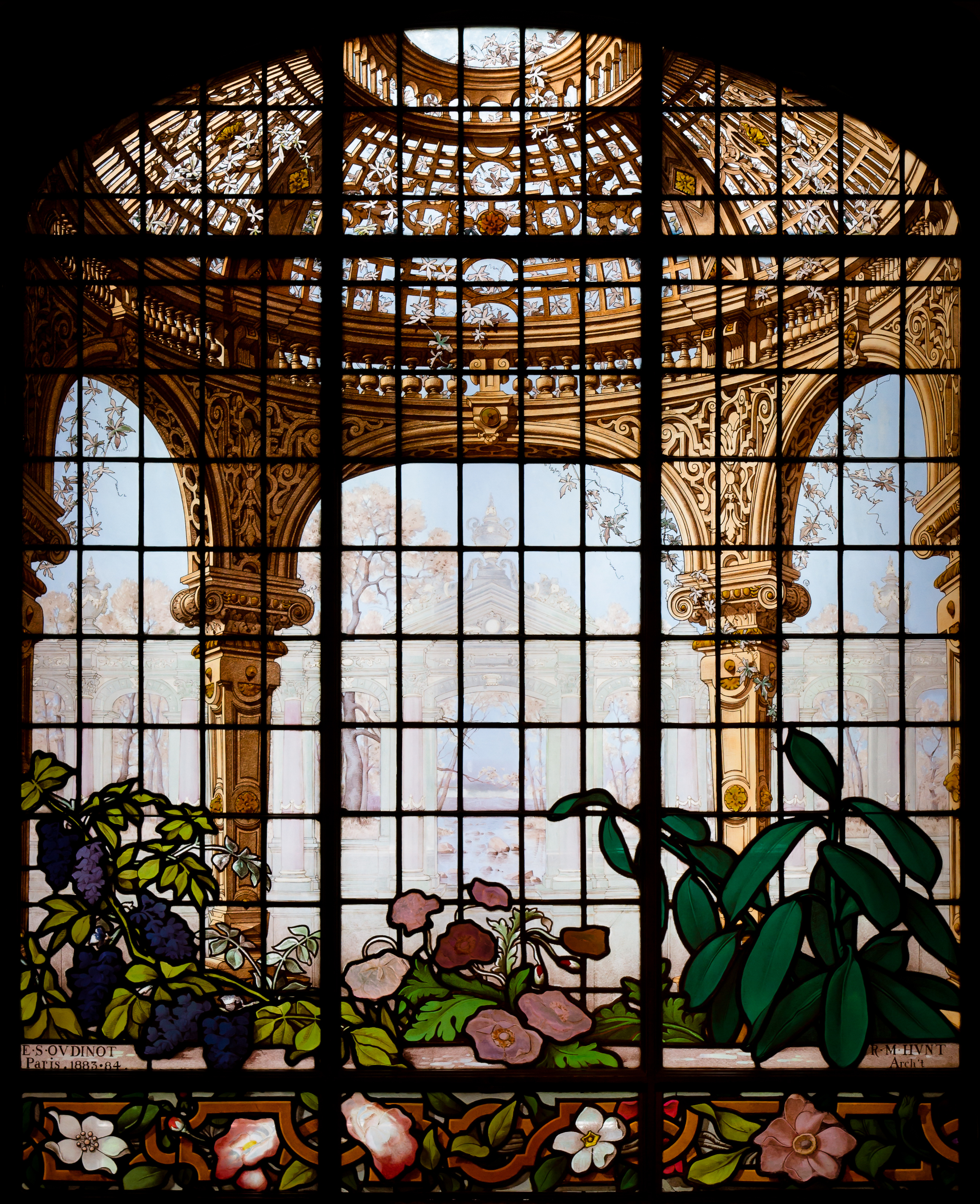
A trompe l'oeil glass, c. 1884, Eugène Stanislas Oudinot, designed by Hunt for Marquand's New York home

Marquand again hired architect Richard Morris Hunt to design his home, and two smaller homes, on the northwest corner of Madison Avenue and 68th Street in New York City. His residence occupying a large plot 42 1/2 feet on the Avenue and 120 feet on the Street, faced 68th Street with the two smaller houses opening on to Madison Avenue with the three residences blending into a unified whole with balconies, gables, and multi-level mansard roofs. The large red brick with limestone trim home was designed in the "French transitional" style, melding elements of Renaissance and Gothic Revival, took three years to build and was completed in 1884 to accommodate his extensive art collection. The mansion was decorated in the Victorian fashion and was heavily influenced by Aestheticism. Marquand hired Sir Frederick Leighton (president of the Royal Academy), Louis Comfort Tiffany, John La Farge, Ellin & Kitson, Sir Edward Poynter, and Sir Lawrence Alma-Tadema to design the lush themed rooms and furniture. He filled the hallways and galleries of the home his renowned collection of antiquities and artworks, including works by the old masters including Anthony van Dyck, Frans Hals, Rembrandt, and Johannes Vermeer.

After being vacant for five years, 816 Madison Avenue, one of the adjacent homes was rented by Marquand to former President Grover Cleveland. It was later the home of his youngest daughter Elisabeth and her husband Harold Godwin. The other adjoining house, 814 Madison Avenue, was occupied by Marquand's daughter, Mabel Marquand Ward. After his death, the house sat vacant for seven years before it was sold for $500,000 to a syndicate led by former New York State Senator George B. Agnew and torn down in April 1912. In May 1912, a syndicate led by architect Herbert Lucas acquired 814 and 816 Madison Avenue from Marquand's daughters, which were also torn down. All three were replaced by one large 12-story apartment building at 11 East 68th Street, today owned by HFZ Capital Group and known as The Marquand, home to many prominent people, including William H. Force, sculptor Evelyn Beatrice Longman, and Elie Hirschfeld.

Cultural offices
Preceded by John Taylor Johnston	President of the Metropolitan Museum of Art; 1889–1902	Succeeded by Frederic W. Rhinelander
