= William Garret Forbes =

American silversmith

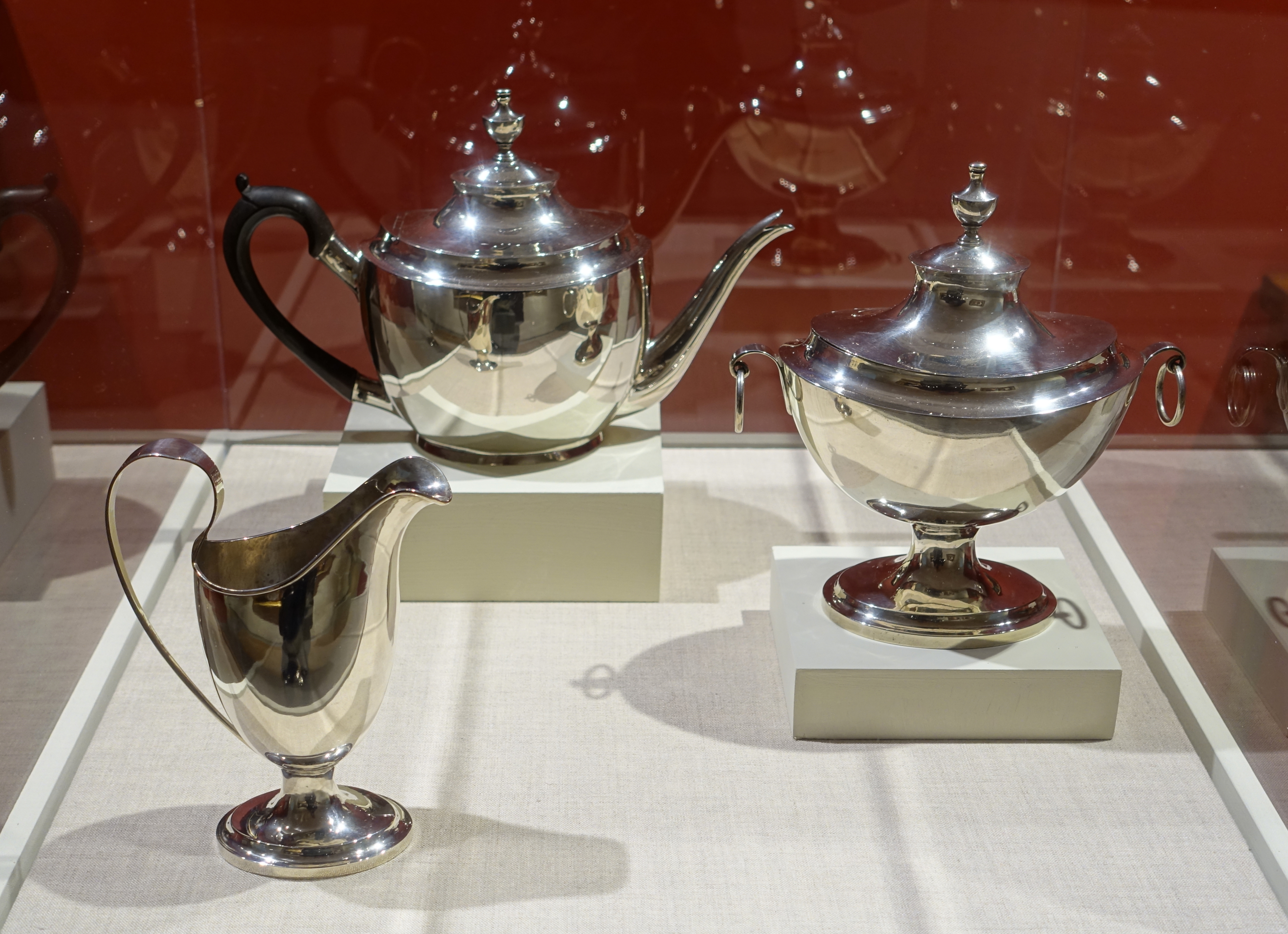
Creamer, teapot, and sugar bowl with cover, by William G. Forbes, c. 1780

William Garret Forbes (December 13, 1751 - January 1, 1840) was an American silversmith, active in New York City from 1773-1809.

Forbes was born in New York City, where he was made a freeman on February 3, 1773. In 1786 he was recorded in the New York Directory as a member of the Gold and Silver Smiths' Society, and joined the Mechanic's Institute in 1802. His shop was listed at 88 Broadway until 1789, then from 1805-1809 at 90 Broadway with his son Garret Forbes. On February 7, 1816, he joined others in petitioning the New York State Senate to request the creation of an office in New York City to assay and stamp silverware. Forbes had four sons, three of whom were also silversmiths (Colin Van Gelder Forbes, John Wolfe Forbes, and Garret Forbes).
