= Josiah Penfield =

- Born: June 6, 1785; Fairfield, Connecticut, U.S.
- Died: 1828 (aged 43); Rye, New York, U.S.
- Occupation: Silversmith
- Relatives: Isaac Marquand (uncle) Frederick Marquand (cousin)

Josiah Penfield (June 6, 1785 – 1828) was an American silversmith based in Savannah, Georgia. Penfield, Georgia, is now named for him.

== Early life ==
Penfield was born in 1785 in Fairfield, Connecticut, to Nathaniel and Rachel Marquand Penfield. He was the middle child of three brothers.

== Career ==
Penfield moved to Savannah, Georgia, around the turn of the 19th century. He worked with the firm of his uncle, Isaac Marquand (1800–1801); Marquand and (Isaac's son, Cornelius) Paulding (1801–1810); Marquand, Paulding and Penfield (1810–1816); Penfield (1816–1820); and J. Penfield and Company (1820–1828). He worked with his cousin Frederick Marquand from around 1821 to 1825 and with Moses Eastman from 1826 to 1828. From around 1813, Marquand, Paulding and Penfield operated locations in Savannah, New York City and New Orleans.

== Personal life ==
In 1808, Penfield was baptized at Savannah's First Baptist Church, where he became a deacon.

He married Sarah B. Pettibone in 1813. She died around a year into their marriage. He married again, a decade later, to Elizabeth Letitia Russell.

A letter dated 1873, by Penfield's nephew, wrote a short biography of his uncle, while in 1874, Frederick Marquand wrote about Penfield's life in Savannah.

== Death and legacy ==
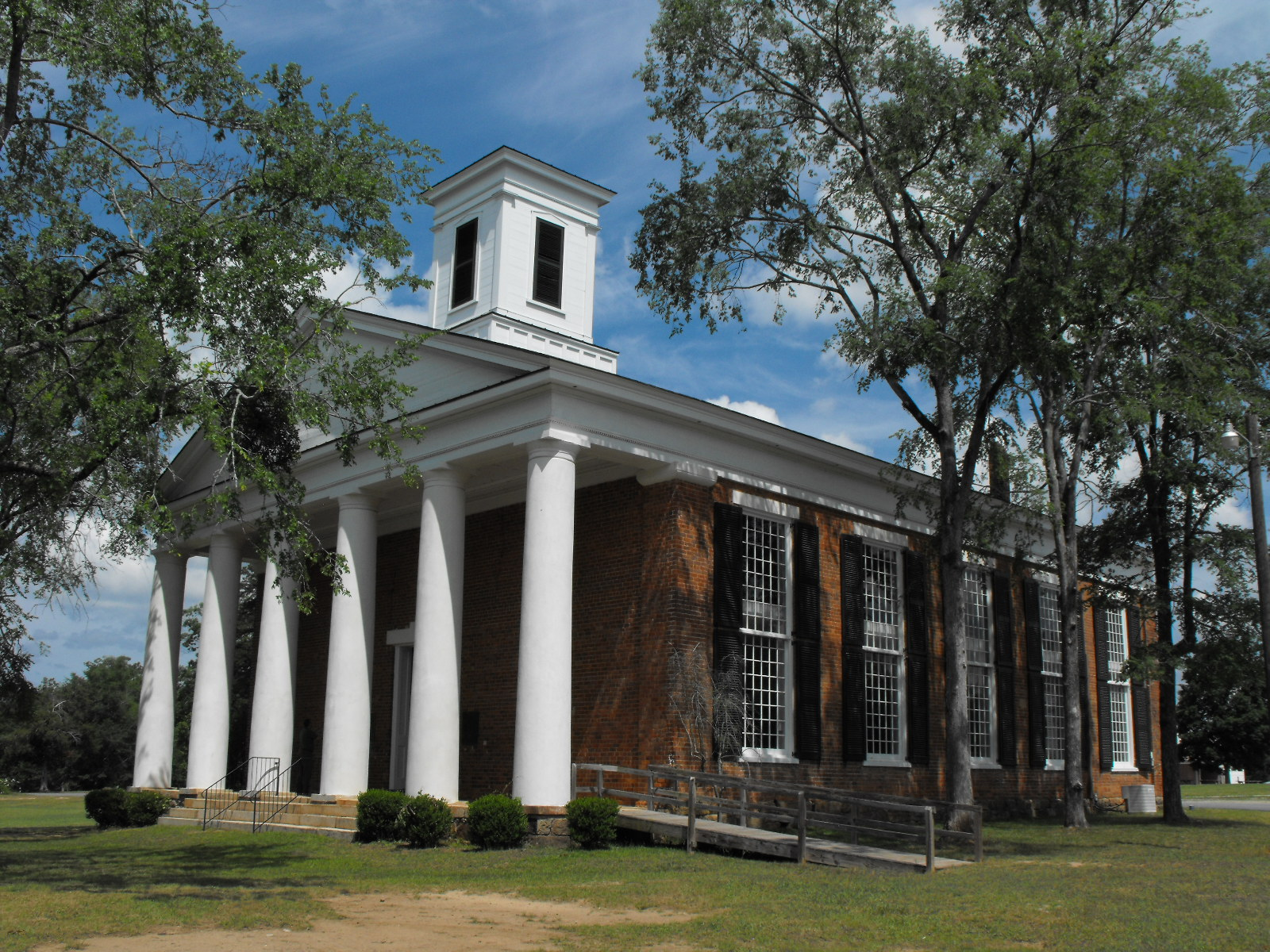
Penfield Baptist Church in Penfield, Georgia

Penfield died in the second half of 1828, aged 43, in Rye, New York. Upon his death, he bequeathed $2,500 to the Georgia Baptist Convention, with the stipulation that they match the amount. The funds helped establish, in 1833, the Mercer Institute in Penfield, Georgia, which was named for him. In 1950, the Convention installed a bronze plaque on Broughton Street in Savannah, outside Penfield's former business.

He also provided funds for the erection of a "House for the religious worship of seaman in the city of Savannah." In December 1832, a brick-built Penfield Mariners' Church was consecrated on Bay Street. It existed for twelve years.
