= Front line (disambiguation) =

Front line refers to the forward-most forces on a battlefield.

Front line, front lines or variants may also refer to:

== Arts, entertainment, and media ==
=== Books and publications ===
- Front Lines (novel), young adult historical novel by American author Michael Grant
- Frontlines series, a novel series by Marko Kloos
- Frontline (journal), journal produced in support of the Scottish Socialist Party
- Frontline (magazine), English-language Indian news magazine
- Frontline Combat, 1950s war comic anthology
- Front Line, fictional Marvel Comics newspaper that eventually replaced the Daily Bugle
- Civil War: Front Line, comic book series (2006–2007)

=== Film ===
- Front Line (film), 1981 documentary
- The Front Line (2006 film), Irish thriller
- The Front Line (2009 film), Italian crime drama
- The Front Line (2011 film), Korean war drama

=== Television ===
- Frontline (Australian TV series), 1990s satirical series
- Frontline (American TV program), PBS documentary program launched in 1983
- The Front Line (British TV series), 1980s British sitcom
- The Frontline (Irish TV programme), 2009 topical debate programme
- BBC Scotland Investigates, current affairs program previously known as Frontline Scotland
- Frontline (The Bill), storyline in the British television series The Bill
- Frontline Pilipinas, Philippine television newscast broadcast by TV5

=== Video games ===
- Front Line (video game), 1982 arcade game by Taito
- Frontlines: Fuel of War, 2008 video game
- Medal of Honor: Frontline, 2002 video game
- Frontlines (Roblox experience), 2022 video game

=== Music ===
- Frontline Records, Christian music record label
- Front Line (record label), reggae subsidiary of Virgin Records
- Frontline (album), Redgum album (1984)

=== Songs ===
- "Front Line" (song), by Stevie Wonder (1983)
- "Frontlines" (song), by Nonpoint (2010)
- "Frontlines", song by Soulfly in the Dark Ages (album)
- "Frontline", song by DJ Shaun Baker (2010)
- "Frontline", song by The Selecter, from the album Daylight (2017)
- "Frontline", single by American singer Kelela, from the album Take Me Apart (2017)

== Bands ==
- Frontline (band), New Zealand hip-hop group
- The Frontline, California rap duo
- The Front Line, New Jersey punk band that eventually became U.S. Chaos
- The Front Line, 1960s band with a song on Love Is the Song We Sing: San Francisco Nuggets 1965–1970
- Frontline, New York punk band formed in 1981, featuring future members of Cro Mags, Bad Brains, and the Icemen, and have had a song covered by Beastie Boys.

== Organizations ==
- Frontline Ltd., shipping company
- Frontline Systems Australia, IT company
- Frontline Foundation, Los Angeles nonprofit organization
- Frontline Club, British media correspondents' club
- Frontline Television News, co-operative of news cameramen
- Front Line (political party) in Greece
- Front Line Defenders, Irish-based human rights organisation
- Frontline States, organization of African nations
- Prima Linea (Front Line), Italian terrorist group (active 1976–1983)
- Primera Línea, 2019–21 loose association of Chilean protestors
- Frontline (ministry), young adult ministry based in Washington, D.C.
- The TNA Front Line, professional wrestling stable
- Frontline, an imprint of American publisher Charisma Media

== Other uses ==
- Front Line (CRI), English-language Chinese news radio program
- Operation Front Line, U.S. national security operation
- Frontline (product) is used for the control of fleas and ticks in animals
