= Woman in the World of Jesus =

1978 book by Evelyn Stagg and Frank Stagg

- Title page for Woman in the World of Jesus (1978)
- Author: Evelyn Stagg and Dr. Frank Stagg
- Subject: Women in the Bible
- Publisher: Westminster Press
- Publication date: 1978
- Media type: Print
- Dewey Decimal: 261.83412
- LC Class: BS2545.W65

Woman in the World of Jesus is a book written by classicist Evelyn Stagg and renowned Baptist theologian Dr. Frank Stagg. It was published in 1978 by Westminster Press in Philadelphia, Pennsylvania.

This book explores women's role in the church today by examining what it was like for woman in the world into which Jesus was born. The authors show how woman was perceived, how she was treated, and how she saw herself.

The book describes:

- the status of woman in the world Jesus entered;
- the position of Jesus with respect to women; and
- the status of women in the church as reflected in the New Testament.

The three divisions of the book:

- Part I describes the Jewish-Greek-Roman world that bears most directly upon the world in which Jesus lived.
- Part II is concerned with Jesus' manner, teaching, and post-resurrection appearances to women.
- Part III investigates perspectives on woman in the writings of Paul, the early Domestic Code embedded in the New Testament, the Synoptic Gospels, the book of Acts of the Apostles, and the writings of the Apostle John.

== Overview ==
The book opens with an in-depth probe of the ancient world to see how woman fared in the eras leading up to the birth of Jesus.

The book is written from a Christian perspective. The basic concern behind the book is to understand the intention of Jesus for woman, in which light the past performance of the church may be tested and directions for the church today may be sought. The authors expressed their intent to make Jesus the heart of the book. Their basic assumption in the book is that the New Testament, in particular the tradition centering in Jesus himself, as revealed in the Synoptic Gospels, remains for Christians their basic and authoritative witness for seeking direction.

The Staggs write that although Jesus founded the church, from the first it has struggled to understand him and to follow him. As examples, they cite Jesus' teaching that "whoever does the will of God is my mother, and my brother, and my sister," and the proclamation that "in Christ there is no male nor female."

In marked contrast, in the early Christian church women were told to wear veils when praying or prophesying and to keep silent in church. In the non-canonical Gnostic Gospel of Thomas, Peter says to Jesus: "Tell Mary to leave us, "for women are not worthy of life." That book was widely circulated in the early church. Many church fathers began to preach that Jesus had died to rid the world of Adam’s sin. The source of that sin, said the clerics, was Eve. In the third century, the prolific defender of the orthodox church, Tertullian, wrote: "On account of [women]…even the Son of God had to die."

The Staggs believe that the six antitheses ("You have heard it was said...but I say unto you...") of Matthew 5:21–48 are evidence that Jesus intended to correct his heritage.

The radical correctiveness of Jesus to his religious heritage are apparent throughout the Gospels, and there should be no surprise that this holds for what he did for woman. The Christian hermeneutic which sees Jesus as both respectful of his heritage and exercising a lordship over it is both compelled by the New Testament and visible to the piety today which esteems and cherishes all Scripture yet worships Christ the Lord above all. By the same token, Jesus must be Lord over his church, the one by whom it is to be measured and corrected today." (pp. 10-11)

== The authors ==
Evelyn and Frank Stagg are a husband and wife team who coauthored this book. Dr. Frank Stagg was Senior Professor of New Testament Interpretation at Southern Baptist Theological Seminary in Louisville, Kentucky. He also taught at New Orleans Baptist Theological Seminary.

== See also ==
- Christian egalitarianism
- Christian views about women
