= Mark E. Biddle =

American theologian (born 1957)

Mark E. Biddle (born 1957) is the Russell T. Cherry Professor of Hebrew Bible/Old Testament at the Baptist Theological Seminary at Richmond in Richmond, Virginia. He is editor of the Review & Expositor journal.

== Education ==
Biddle, a native of Fort Payne, Alabama, was educated in the public schools of DeKalb County, Alabama and Orange County, Florida. Biddle received a B.A. from Samford University in Homewood, Alabama, an M.Div. from the Southern Baptist Theological Seminary in Wake Forest, North Carolina, a Th.M. from International Baptist Theological Seminary of the European Baptist Federation in Prague, Czech Republic and a Dr. Theol. from the University of Zurich in Zürich, Switzerland.

== Books ==
- A Redaction History of Jeremiah 2:1-4:2, Abhandlungen zur Theologie des Alten und Neuen Testaments 77. Zürich: TVZ, 1990.
- Polyphony and Symphony in Prophetic Literature: A Literary Analysis of Jeremiah 7-20, Studies in Old Testament Interpretation 2. Macon, GA: Mercer University Press, 1996.
- Deuteronomy, Smyth & Helwys Bible Commentary 4. Macon: Smyth & Helwys, 2003.
- Missing the Mark: Sin and Its Consequences in Biblical Theology. Nashville: Abingdon, 2005.
- Judges: Reading the Old Testament. Macon: Smyth & Helwys, 2012.
- A Time to Laugh: Humor in the Bible. Macon: Smyth & Helwys, 2013.

== Articles in journals and collected works ==
- "The Literary Frame Surrounding Jeremiah 30:1-33:26," Zeitschrift für Alttestamentliche Wissenschaft 100 (1988): 409–413.
- "The 'Endangered Ancestress' and Blessing for the Nations," Journal of Biblical Literature (=JBL) 109 (1990): 599–611.
- "Christian Interpretation of the Old Testament: A Methodological Problem," Faculty Studies (Carson Newman College) 1990: 27–43.
- "The Figure of Lady Jerusalem: Identification, Deification and Personification of Cities in the Ancient Near East," in The Canon in Comparative Perspective, Scripture in Context IV, B. Batto, W. Hallo, and L. Younger, eds. Lewiston: New York: Mellen Press, 1991. pp. 173–194.
- "Bible Study Guide: The Book of Micah," Pulpit Digest 73/517 (1992): 77–81.
- "Lady Zion's Alter Egos: Isaiah 47:1-15 and 57:6-13 as Structural Counterparts," in New Visions of the Book of Isaiah, JSOTSup 214, R. Melugin and M. Sweeney, eds. Sheffield: JSOT Press, 1997. pp. 124–139.
- "The City of Chaos and the New Jerusalem: Isaiah 24-27 in Context," Perspectives in Religious Studies 22 (1995): 5–12.
- "Amos: Introduction," in Interpreting Amos for Teaching and Preaching. Macon: Smyth and Helwys, 1996.
- "Laboratory for Learning: Promoting Community Learning Across Curricular and Co-Curricular Functions," (with E. Lee and W. McDonald) in Who Teaches? Who Learns? Authentic Student/Faculty Partners, R. Jenkins and K. Romer, eds. Providence, RI: Ivy Publishers, 1998. pp. 69–76.
- "Literary Structures in the Book of Joshua," Review & Expositor (=RE) 95 (1998): 189–202.
- "'Israel' and 'Jacob' in the Book of Micah: Micah in the Context of the Twelve," in Society of Biblical Literature 1998 Seminar Papers Part Two. Atlanta: Society of Biblical Literature, 1998. pp. 850–871.
- Sermon ideas/summaries on select texts in Genesis for the 2001 edition of Abingdon's Ministers Manual.
- "Ancestral Motifs In 1 Samuel 25: Intertextuality and Characterization," JBL 121 (2002): 617–638.
- "Contingency, God, and the Babylonians: Jeremiah on the Complexity of Repentance," RE 101 (2004): 247–65.
- "A Word About Separation of Church and State," RE 101 (2004): 583–586.
- "Genesis 3: Sin, Shame and Self-Esteem," RE 103 (2006): 359–370.
- "Obadiah-Jonah-Micah in Canonical Context: The Nature of Prophetic Literature and Hermeneutics," Interpretation 61 (2007): 154–166.
- "Song of Songs: A Brief Annotated Bibliography," RE 105 (2008): 481 – 490.
- "Teaching Isaiah Today," PRS 36 (2009): 257–272.
- "The Biblical Prohibition Against Usury," Int 65 (2011): 117–127.
- "Joshua 24:1-3a, 14-25," Lectionary Homiletics 22/6 (October/November 2011): 41–42.
- "Judges 4:1-7," Lectionary Homiletics 22/6 (October/November 2011): 49–50.
- "Dominion Returns to Jerusalem: An Examination of Developments in the Kingship and Zion Traditions as Reflected in the Book of the Twelve with Particular Attention to Micah 4-5," in Perspectives on the Formation of the Book of the Twelve: Methodological Foundations, Redactional Processes, Historical Insights, BZAW 433. R. Albertz, J. Wöhrle, and J. Nogalski, eds.; Berlin: de Gruyter, 2012. pp. 253–267.

== Dictionary articles ==
- "Murder," in The Mercer Dictionary of the Bible, Watson E. Mills, ed. Macon: MercerUniversity Press, 1990.
- "Redaction Criticism: Hebrew Bible," in Dictionary of Biblical Interpretation, John H. Hayes, ed. Nashville: Abingdon, 1999. pp. 373–376.
- "Jeremiah, Letter of Jeremiah, Baruch," Oxford Annotated Bible. New York: Oxford University Press, 2001.
- "Execration," "Flesh in the OT," "Humor" and "Perish" in New Interpreter's Dictionary of the Bible, 5 vols., K. D. Sakenfeld, et al., eds. Nashville: Abingdon 2006–2009.
- "Sin," in Dictionary of Scripture and Ethics. Grand Rapids: Baker Academic (2009).
- "Deposit and Pledge," in The Oxford Encyclopedia of Bible and Law (forthcoming).

== Translations ==
- Ernst Jenni and Claus Westermann, eds. Theological Lexicon of the Old Testament. 3 vols. Peabody, MA: Hendrickson, 1997. (= Theologisches Handwörterbuch zum Alten Testament. 2 vols. Munich: Kaiser, 1984).
- Hermann Gunkel. Genesis. Mercer Library of Biblical Studies. Macon, GA: Mercer University Press, 1997.
- Martin Hengel. The Septuagint as Christian Scripture: Its Prehistory and the Problem of Its Canon. Edinburgh: T. & T. Clark, 2002. (= Die Septuaginta: Zwischen Judentum und Christentum. Tübingen: Mohr/Siebeck, 1994).
- Julius Wellhausen. The Pharisees and the Sadducees: An Examination of Internal Jewish History. Mercer Library of Biblical Studies. Macon, GA: Mercer University Press, 2001 (= Die Pharisäer und die Sadducäer: Eine Untersuchung zur inneren jüdischen Geschichte. 3rd ed. Göttingen: Vandenhoeck & Ruprecht, 1967).
- Otto Kaiser. The Old Testament Apocrypha: An Introduction to the Fundamentals. Peabody, MA: Hendrickson, 2004 (= Die alttestamentlichen Apokryphen: Eine Einleitung in Grundzügen. Gütersloh: Kaiser, 2000).
- Contributing translator to Religion, Past and Present (= Religion in Geschichte und Gegenwart, Leiden: Brill) Leiden: Brill, 2007ff.
- M. Hauger, "'But We Were in the Wilderness, and There God Speaks Quite Differently': On the Significance of Preaching in the Theology and Work of Gerhard von Rad" in Int 62 (2008): 278–292.
- Gerhard von Rad, "Sermon on Luke 24:13-35" in Int 52 (2008): 294–303.
- Reinhard Feldmeier and Hermann Spieckermann, God of the Living. Waco: Baylor, 2011. (= Der Gott der Lebendigen: Eine biblische Gotteslehre. Tübingen: Mohr/Siebeck, 2011.)
- Sigmund Mowinckel, Psalm Studies. 2 vols. SBL History of Biblical Studies 2, 3. Atlanta: SBL Press, 2014. (= Psalmenstudien. 6 vols. Kristiania: Dybwad, 1921–1924).
- Andreas Schüle, Die Urgeschichte (forthcoming).

== Book reviews ==
- W. Werner, Studien zur alttestamentlichen Vorstellung vom Plan Jahwes, in JBL 109 (1990): 512–514.
- G. Fleischer, Von Menschenverkäufern, Baschankühen, und Rechtsverkehren and S. Rosenbaum, Amos of Israel (cluster review), in Critical Review of Books in Religion, E. J. Epp, ed. Atlanta: Scholars Press, 1991. pp. 133–136.
- W. Dever, Recent Archaeological Discoveries and Biblical Research, in Interpretation 46 (1992): 197–198.
- R. Ginn, The Present and the Past, J. Wilcox, The Bitterness of Job, and W. Farley, Tragic Vision and Divine Compassion (cluster review), in Perspectives in Religious Studies 18 (1991): 261–264.
- J. Sasson, Jonah, in Horizons in Biblical Theology 13 (1991): 77–78.
- H. Niehr, Der höchste Gott: Alttestamentlicher JHWH-Glaube im Kontext syrisch-kanaanäischer Religion des 1. Jahrtausends v. Chr., in Catholic Biblical Quarterly (= CBQ) 54 (1992): 120–121.
- J. van Ruiten, Een Begin Zonder Einde: De doorwerking van Jesaja 65:17 in de intertestamentaire literatuur en het Nieuwe Testament, in CBQ 54 (1992): 549–550.
- D. H. Bak, Klagender Gott – Klagende Menschen, in CBQ 55 (1993): 108–109.
- B. Bozak, Life 'Anew': A Literary-Theological Study of Jer. 30-31, in CBQ 55 (1993): 324–325.
- Y. Goldman, Prophétie et royauté au retour de l'exil, in CBQ 55 (1993): 758–759.
- R. Albertz, Religionsgeschichte Israels in alttestamentlicher Zeit, in CBQ 56 (1994): 312–314.
- T. Lescow, Das Stufenschema: Untersuchungen zur Struktur alttestamentlicher Texte, in CBQ 56 (1994): 767–768.
- H. Nobel, Gods gedachten tellen: Numerike structuuranalyse en de elf gedachten Gods in Genesis – 2 Koningen, in CBQ 56 (1994): 774–776.
- J. Lundbom, The Early Career of the Prophet Jeremiah, in CBQ 57 (1995): 150–151.
- B. Lang, Eugen Drewermann, interprète de la Bible: Le paradis. Le naissance du Christ, in CBQ 57 (1995): 560–561.
- G. Fischer, Das Trostbüchlein: Text, Komposition un Theologie von Jer 30-31, in Religious Studies Review (= RSR) 21 (1995): 224.
- J. Jeremias, Der Prophet Amos, in JBL 116 (1997): 548-550 (=http://www.bookreviews.org/pdf/2644_1586.pdf).
- R. Bergen, ed., Biblical Hebrew and Discourse Linguistics, in CBQ 58 (1996): 370–372.
- K. Pfisterer Darr, Isaiah's Vision and the Family of God, in RSR 22 (1996): 60.
- Jun-Hee Cha, Micha und Jeremia, in CBQ 59 (1997): 339–340.
- D. Penchansky, The Politics of Biblical Theology, in CBQ 59 (1997): 133–135.
- K. Schmid, Buchgestalten des Jeremiabuches: Untersuchungen zur Redaktions- und Rezeptionsgeschichte von Jer 30-33 im Kontext des Buches, in CBQ 60 (1998): 344–345.
- D. Rotzoll, Studien zur Redaktion und Komposition des Amosbuches, in Review of Biblical Literature, M. Sweeney, el al, eds. Atlanta: Society of Biblical Literature, 1999. pp. 158–159 (=http://www.bookreviews.org/pdf/2534_1756.pdf).
- B. Zapff, Redaktionsgeschichtliche Studien zum Michabuch im Kontext des Dodekapropheton, in CBQ 61 (1999): 569–570.
- J. P. Fokkelman, Major Poems of the Hebrew Bible, Volume I: Ex. 15, Deut 32, and Job 3: At the Interface of Hermeneutics and Structural Analysis, in RSR 25 (1999): 285.
- C. Seitz and K. Greene-McCreight, eds., Theological Exegesis: Essays in Honor of Brevard S. Childs, in CBQ 62 (2000): 190–91.
- B. Janowski, Stellvertretung: Alttestamentlich Studien zu einem theologischen Grundbegriff, in RSR 24 (1998): 289.
- W. Harrelson, The Ten Commandments and Human Rights, in RevExp 95 (1998): 288–289.
- P. Kelley, Journey to the Land of Promise: Genesis – Deuteronomy, in RevExp 95 (1998): 292.
- K. King, ed., Women and Goddess Traditions: In Antiquity and Today, in RevExp 95 (1998): 296.
- R. Ulmer, trans., Maaserot – Zehnte, Maaser Sheni – Zweiter Zehnt, in RevExp 95 (1998): 293–294.
- G. Ashby, God Out and Meet God: A Commentary on the Book of Exodus, in RevExp 95 (1998): 449.
- F. Gorman Jr. Divine Presence and Community: A Commentary on the Book of Leviticus, in RevExp 95 (1998): 453.
- T. Longman, III. The Book of Ecclesiastes, in RevExp 95 (1998): 454.
- J. Oswalt, The Book of Isaiah: Chapters 40-66, in RevExp 95 (1998): 456.
- E. Tiffany, The Image of God in Creation, in RevExp 95 (1998): 456–457.
- G. Fackre, The Doctrine of Revelation: A Narrative Interpretation, in RevExp 95 (1998): 458.
- R. Farmer, Beyond the Impasse: The Promise of a Process Hermeneutic, in RevExp 95 (1998): 459.
- A. Porterfield, The Power of Religion: A Comparative Introduction, in RevExp 95 (1998): 461–462.
- H. Utzschneider, Michas Reise in die Zeit, in CBQ 62 (2000): 739–740.
- J. Watts, Reading Law: The Rhetorical Shaping of the Pentateuch, in RevExp 97 (2000): 107–08.
- J. Eaton, Mysterious Messengers: A Course on Hebrew Prophecy From Amos Onwards, in RevExp 97 (2000): 514.
- F. Holmgren, The Old Testament and the Significance of Jesus: Embracing Change – Maintaining Christian Identity, in RevExp 97 (2000): 514–515.
- G. Fee, Listening to the Spirit in the Text, in RevExp 97 (2000): 516–517.
- J. G. Millar, Now Choose Life: Theology and Ethics in Deuteronomy, in RevExp 97 (2000): 513–514.
- P. D. Miller, Israelite Religion and Biblical Theology: Collected Essays, in RSR (2000).
- Francis I. Andersen and David Noel Freedman, Micah: A New Translation With Introduction and Commentary, in CBQ 63 (2001): 507–508.
- E. Ben Zvi, Micah in CBQ 63 (2001): 132–34.
- J. R. Lundbom, Jeremiah 1-20: A New Translation With Introduction and Commentary in Interpretation 55 (2001): 316.
- R. S. Wallace, The Story of Joseph and the Family of Jacob in RevExp 98 (2001): 280–81.
- J. L. Crenshaw, The Psalms: An Introduction in RevExp 98 (2001): 281–82.
- D. Ewert, How to Understand the Bible, in RevExp 98 (2001): 442–43.
- R. J. Coggins, Joel and Amos, in RevExp 98 (2001): 445–47.
- J. Blenkinsopp, Isaiah 1-39, in RevExp 98 (2001): 444–45.
- K. Jobes and M. Silva, Invitation to the Septuagint, in RevExp 98 (2001): 443–44.
- M. Fox, Proverbs 1-9, in RevExp 99 (2002): 110–11.
- W. Brueggemann, Deuteronomy, Abingdon Old Testament Commentaries, in Interpretation 56 (2002): 328.
- D. Gowan, Daniel, Abingdon Old Testament Commentaries, in RevExp 99 (2002): 277–8.
- J. Barton, Joel and Obadiah, The Old Testament Library, in RevExp 99 (2002): 279–80.
- T. Longman III, Song of Songs, The New International Commentary on the Old Testament, in RevExp 99 (2002): 284–85.
- G. Fee, To What End Exegesis? in RevExp 99 (2002): 287.
- W. Janzen, Exodus, Believers Bible Commentary, in RevExp 99 (2002): 455–56.
- W. Brueggemann, Ichabod Toward Home: The Journey of God's Glory, in RevExp 99 (2002): 458.
- P. Quinn-Miscall, Reading Isaiah: Poetry and Vision, in RevExp 99 (2002): 460–61.
- C. Seitz, Figured Out: Typology and Providence in Christian Scripture, in RevExp 99 (2002): 456–57.
- V. Matthews, Social World of the Hebrew Prophets, in RevExp 99 (2002): 461.
- K. R. Nemet-Nejat, Daily Life in Ancient Mesopotamia, in RevExp (forthcoming).
- Stephan Davis, The Antithesis of the Ages: Paul's Reconfiguration of the Torah in RevExp 99 (2002): 623–24.
- Paul Hooker, First and Second Chronicles, in RevExp 99 (2002): 625.
- David L. Petersen, The Prophetic Literature: An Introduction, in RevExp 99 (2002): 627.
- "Reading the Prophets," a cluster review of A. Heschel, The Prophets; W. Brueggeman, The Prophetic Imagination; and C. Dempsey, The Prophets, in Christian Reflection (2003): 82–86.
- Steven Tuell, First and Second Chronicles, in RevExp 100 (2003): 131–132.
- Mark S. Smith, Untold Stories: The Bible and Ugaritic Studies in the Twentieth Century, in RevExp 100 (2003): 136–37.
- Duane A. Garrett, A Modern Grammar for Classical Hebrew, in RevExp 100 (2003): 135–36.
- Jonathan Goldstein, Peoples of an Almighty God Competing Religions in the Ancient World in RevExp 100 (2003): 283–84.
- Wojciech Pikor, La Comunicazione Profetica alla Luce di Ez 2-3, in CBQ 66 (2004): 299–300.
- Martin Kessler, Battle of the Gods: The God of Israel Versus Marduk of Babylon: A Literary/Theological Interpretation of Jeremiah 50-51 in RBL (http://www.bookreviews.org/pdf/4019_4302.pdf).
- Philippe Guillaume, Waiting for Josiah: The Judges, in Perspectives in Religious Studies 33 (2006): 512–513.
- Louis Stulman, Jeremiah, Abingdon Old Testament Commentaries, in Int 60 (2006): 97–98.
- Abraham Joshua Heschel, Heavenly Torah: As Refracted through the Generations, in Perspectives in Religious Studies 33 (2006): 511–512.
- Bruce A. Little, A Creation-Order Theodicy: God and Gratuitous Evil, in RevExp 102 (2005): 532–33.
- J. Neusner, Rabbinic Literature: An Essential Guide in RevExp 102 (2005): 536–38.
- Carl E. Braaten and Christopher R. Seitz, eds., I Am the Lord Your God: Christian Reflections on the Ten Commandments in RevExp 102 (2005): 743–45.
- Jacob Neusner, Transformations in Ancient Judaism: Textual Evidence for Creative Responses to Crisis in RevExp 103 (2006): 638–640.
- Gary N. Knoppers, I Chronicles 1-9: A New Translation with Introduction and Commentary, AB 12; I Chronicles 10-20: A New Translation with Introduction and Commentary, AB 12A in RevExp 103 (2006): 836–39.
- Athalya Brenner, ed., Are we Amused? Humour About Women in the Biblical Worlds, in PRS (forthcoming).
- Elisabeth Tetlow, Women, Crime, and Punishment in Ancient Law and Society: Vol. 1, The Ancient Near East in PRS 34 (2007): 241–245.
- Walter Brueggemann, Solomon: Israel's Ironic Icon of Human Achievement in Int (2006).
- Cheryl Anderson, Women, Ideology and Violence: Critical Theory and the Construction of Gender in the Book of the Covenant and the Deuteronomic Law in PRS 34 (2007): 241–245.
- William Yarchin, History of Biblical Interpretation: A Reader in RevExp 103 (2006): 428–29.
- Kiss, Jenö, Die Klage Gottes und des Propheten: Ihre Rolle in der Komposition und Redaktion von Jer 11-12, 14-15 and 18 in RBL 3 (2007) (http://www.bookreviews.org/pdf/5346_5636.pdf).
- Mary Shields, Circumscribing the Prostitute: The Rhetorics of Intertextuality, Metaphor and Gender in Jeremiah 3.1-4.4 in RBL 8 (2008): 198-200 (=http://www.bookreviews.org/pdf/4503_4563.pdf).
- Waltke, B, A Commentary on Micah in Int 62 (2008): 334–35.
- Hjelde, Sigurd, Sigmund Mowinckel und seine Zeit: Leben und Werk eines norwegischen Alttestamentlers in RBL 9 (207) (http://www.bookreviews.org/pdf/5794_6117.pdf).
- Neil B. MacDonald, Metaphysics and the God of Israel: Systematic Theology of the Old and New Testaments in RevExp 104 (2007): 823–825.
- Georg Fischer, Jeremia: Der Stand der theologischen Diskussion in CBQ 70 (2008): 339–341.
- Patrick Miller, The Way of the Lord: Essays in Old Testament Theology in RevExp 105 (2008): 153–54.
- Brian Block, Singing the Ethos of God in RevExp 105 (2008): 519–521.
- Susan Niditch, Judges: A Commentary in RevExp (forthcoming).
- J. Gordon Harris, et al., Joshua, Judges, Ruth in RevExp (forthcoming).
- Kenneth Berding and Jonathan Lunde, eds., Three Views on the New Testament Use of the Old Testament in RevExp 106 (2009): 275–77.
- T. Longman III, Jeremiah, Lamentations in RevExp 106 (2009): 501–02.
- R. Smend, From Astruc to Zimmerli: Old Testament Scholarship in Three Centuries in CBQ 71 (2009): 149–150.
- J. Crenshaw, Prophetic Conflict: Its Effect on Israelite Religion in RevExp 106 (2009): 635–37.
- H. Bezzel, Die Konfessionen Jeremias: Eine redaktionsgeschichtliche Studie in CBQ 71 (2009): 600–602.
- L. Allen, Jeremiah: A Commentary in Int 64 (2010): 86–88.
- Gary A. Anderson, Sin: A History in Int 65 (2011): 206–208.
- Reinhard Kratz and Herrmann Speickermann, eds., Zeit und Ewigkeit als Raum göttlichen Handelns in CBQ 72 (2010): 630–631.
- T. Niklas, K. Zamfir, and H. Braun, eds. Theologies of Creation in Early Judaism and Ancient Christianity: In Honour of Hans Klein in CBQ 74 (2012): 411–13.
- W. Brown, The Seven Pillars of Creation: The Bible, Science, and the Ecology of Wonder in RevExp 108 (2011): 110–111.
- Lemche, N.P. The Old Testament between Theology and History: A Critical Survey in RevExp 108 (2011): 320-321 (with Kathryn Camp).
- Dearman, J. Andrew. The Book of Hosea in Int 66 (2012): 211–212.
- Spinks, D. Christopher. The Bible and the Crisis of Meaning: Debates on the Theological Interpretation of Scriptures in RevExp 108 (2011): 606–608.
- Seitz, Christopher D. The Goodly Fellowship of the Prophets: The Achievement of Association in Canon Formation in Journal of Hebrew Scriptures 12 (2012). (http://www.jhsonline.org/reviews/reviews_new/review596.htm)
- Jackson, Melissa A. Comedy and Feminist Interpretation of the Hebrew Bible: A Subversive Collaboration in RevExp 110 (2013): 142–144.
- Mobley, Gregory. The Return of the Chaos Monster — And Other Backstories of the Bible in Int 67 (2013): 438–239.
- Segal, Alan F. Sinning in the Hebrew Bible: How the Worst Stories Speak for Its Truth in Int (forthcoming).
- Humphreys, W. Lee. The Character of God in the Book of Genesis: A Narrative Appraisal in RevExp (forthcoming).
- Anderson, Cheryl B. Ancient Laws & Contemporary Controversies: The Need for Inclusive Biblical Interpretation in RevExp (forthcoming).

== Papers and lectures ==
- "The Figure of Lady Jerusalem: Identification, Deification and Personification of Cities in the Ancient Near East" (1991 SBL Southeastern Regional Meeting, Atlanta).
- "Lady Zion's Alter Egos: Isaiah 47:1-15 and 57:6-13 as Structural Counterparts" (1991 SBL Annual Meeting, Kansas City).
- "The City of Chaos and the New Jerusalem: Isaiah 24-27 in Context" (1992 SBL Annual Meeting, San Francisco).
- "Confessional Materials in Jeremiah 7-10" (1993 SBL Annual Meeting, Washington, DC).
- 1993 Russell Bradley Jones Lecturer, Carson Newman College.
- "Liturgical Materials in Jeremiah 7-20: The Question of the Genre of a Prophetic Book" (1994 SBL Annual Meeting, Chicago).
- Response to P. Willey, "The Servant of YHWH and Daughter Zion: Alternating Visions of YHWH's Community" (1995 SBL Annual Meeting, Philadelphia).
- "A Joel-Layer of Redaction in the Book of the Twelve? A Response to J. Nogalski's Redaction Critical Assessment" (panel presentation, Formation of the Book of the Twelve Consultation, 1995 SBL Annual Meeting, Philadelphia).
- "Intertextuality, Micah, and the Book of the Twelve: A Question of Method" (1996 SBL Annual Meeting, New Orleans).
- 2001 Keynote Address, Lasker Sacred Music Festival, Lasker, NC
- "Obadiah-Jonah-Micah in Canonical Context: The Nature of Prophetic Literature and Hermeneutics" (The Book of the Twelve Prophets Section, SBL Annual Meeting, Washington, DC, November 19, 2006)
- "Dominion Returns to Jerusalem: An Examination of Developments in the Kingship and Zion Traditions as Reflected in the Book of the Twelve with Particular Attention to Micah 4-5" (paper read at the "Perspectives on the Formation of the Book of the Twelve" conference at the University of Münster, January 14–16, 2011).
- "Die (Wieder)Herstellung der Ordnung: Sünde und Aus-der-Ordnung-Sein nach der priesterlichen Auffassung und in den Lehren und Taten Jesu" (invited guest lecture in the "Götterbilder – Gottesbilder – Weltbilder" graduate colloquium at the University of Göttingen, June 21, 2012).

== Editor ==
- W. Brueggemann, 1 and 2 Kings, Smyth & Helwys Bible Commentary. Macon: Smyth & Helwys, 2000.
- T. Fretheim, Jeremiah, Smyth & Helwys Bible Commentary. Macon: Smyth & Helwys, 2002.
- L. Bailey, Leviticus-Numbers, Smyth & Helwys Bible Commentary. Macon: Smyth & Helwys, 2005.
- S. Balentine, Job, Smyth & Helwys Bible Commentary. Macon: Smyth & Helwys, 2007.
- J. Nogalski, The Minor Prophets, Smyth & Helwys Bible Commentary. Macon: Smyth & Helwys, forthcoming.
- J. Sanderson, Judges, Smyth & Helwys Bible Commentary. Macon: Smyth & Helwys, forthcoming.
- Editorial board member, Review and Expositor.
- General editor, Reading the Old Testament, Macon: Smyth & Helwys, forthcoming.
- Issue editor of Review and Expositor volumes on Genesis and Song of Songs, RE 105/3 (2008) (both with Nancy de-Classe Walford) and "Left Behind."
- Issue editor, Apocalypse Now? RE 106/1 (2009).
- Crenshaw, James. Job, ROT (Macon: Smyth & Helwys, 2011).
- Managing editor, Review & Expositor. 2010–2011.
- Bos, Johanna. 1 and 2 Samuel, Reading the Old Testament (=ROT). Macon: Smyth & Helwys, 2012.
- Fretheim, Terrance. Minor Prophets I, ROT. Macon: Smyth & Helwys, 2013.
- Tuell, Steven. Minor Prophets II, ROT. Macon: Smyth & Helwys, 2013.
- Sweeeney, Marvin. Ezekiel, ROT. Macon: Smyth & Helwys, 2013.
- Cook, Stephen. Deuteronomy, ROT. Macon: Smyth & Helwys, 2014.
- Johnstone, William. Exodus, Smyth & Helwys Bible Commentary (=SHBC). Macon: Smyth & Helwys, 2013.
- O'Connor, Kathleen. Genesis, SHBC. Macon: Smyth & Helwys, forthcoming.
- Associate editor, Review & Expositor. 2011–2012.
