= New Orleans Baptist Theological Seminary =

Southern Baptist seminary in Louisiana, USA

Coordinates: 30.005°N 90.044°W

- Motto: Prepare here. Serve anywhere.
- Type: Southern Baptist seminary
- Established: 1917
- Religious affiliation: Southern Baptist Convention
- Endowment: $47 million
- President: James K. Dew
- Provost: Norris C. Grubbs
- Faculty: 70 full-time; 100+ adjunct
- Students: 2,004 (2021-2022)
- Undergraduates: 792
- Postgraduates: 1,212
- Doctoral students: 480
- Location: New Orleans, Louisiana, United States
- Campus: 70+ acres - 70 buildings
- Colors: Purple & Gold
- Nicknames: NOBTS, School of Providence and Prayer
- Website: www.nobts.edu

New Orleans Baptist Theological Seminary (NOBTS) is a Baptist theological institute in New Orleans, Louisiana. It is affiliated with the Southern Baptist Convention. Missions and evangelism are core focuses of the seminary.

NOBTS offers doctoral, master, bachelor, and associate degrees. The seminary has 13 graduate centers in 5 states, 11 undergraduate centers in 5 states, and 13 on-campus research centers. The main campus is situated on over 70 acres with more than 70 buildings.

== History ==
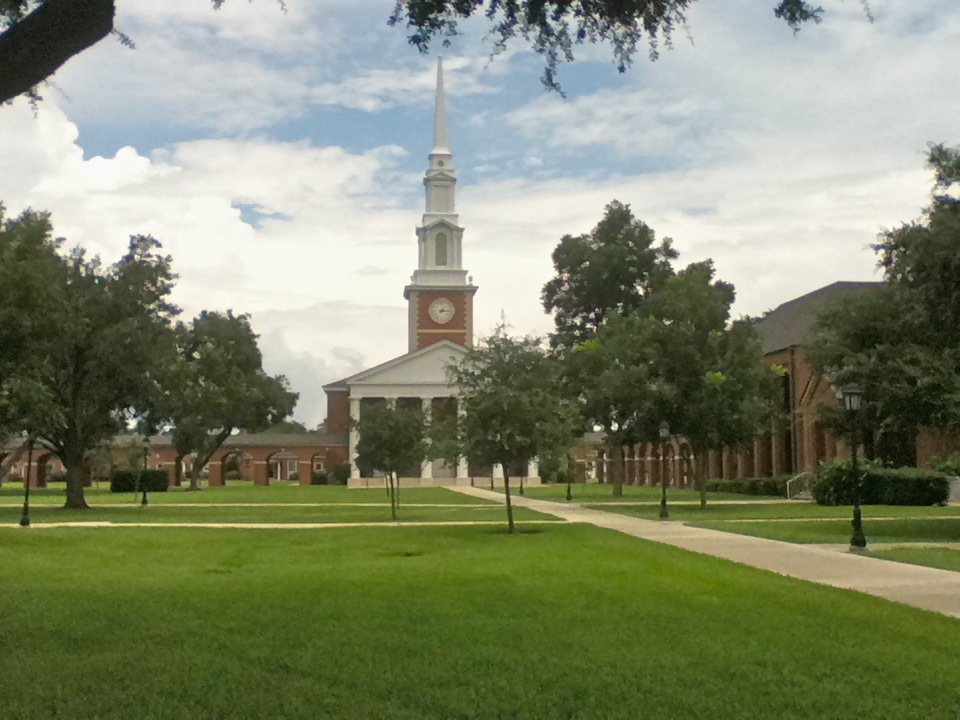
NOBTS's Chapel

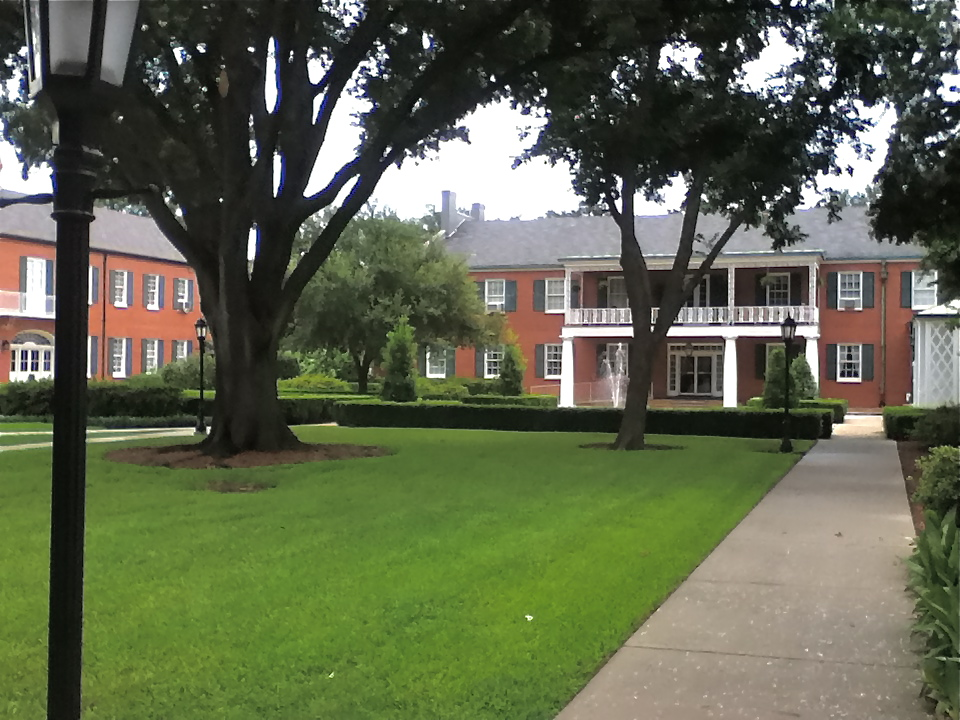
NOBTS courtyard

The Southern Baptist Convention founded the institution as the Baptist Bible Institute during the 1917 convention meeting in New Orleans. New Orleans Baptist Theological Seminary, or NOBTS for short, was the first institution created as a direct act of the Southern Baptist Convention. The institutes's purpose was centered on missionary work, and initially established as gateway to Central America. The Seminary started as the Baptist Bible Institute in the Garden District and later relocated to the current location in the heart of Gentilly.

On May 17, 1946, the SBC revised the institutes' charter to enable it to become a seminary, and the name was changed to New Orleans Baptist Theological Seminary. Missions and evangelism have remained the core focus of the seminary.

In 1953, it relocated from Washington Avenue in the Garden District to a more spacious campus in the Gentilly neighborhood of New Orleans. The school purchased a 75-acre (300,000 m^{2}) pecan orchard and transformed it into what is now a bustling campus over 100 buildings, including academic buildings, faculty and staff housing, and student housing. The new campus was designed by noted Louisiana architect A. Hays Town.

In 1995, a campus was established at the Louisiana State Penitentiary following an invitation from the prison warden, Burl Cain. The school has contributed to a significant reduction in the rate of violence in the prison.

By 2022, it had opened six campuses in prisons in different states.

For the year 2021-2022, it had 2,004 students.

=== Presidents ===
NOBTS has had nine presidents since its founding:

No.	President	Years of service
1	Byron H. Dement	1917–1928
2	William W. Hamilton Sr. (Note: Hamilton was initially appointed acting president before being named to the full position shortly thereafter.)	1928–1942
3 (Note: Robert G. Lee, pastor of Bellevue Baptist Church in Memphis, Tennessee, was initially elected to be the third president, but he declined the position.)	Duke Kimbrough McCall	1943–1946
–	John Jeter Hurt (Note: Served as acting president until Leavell took office.)	1946
4	Roland Q. Leavell	1946–1958
–	J. Washington Watts (Note: Served as acting president)	1958–1959
5	H. Leo Eddleman	1959–1970
–	James Mosteller (Note: Served as acting president from January to October, 1970)	1970
6	Grady C. Cothen	1970–1974
–	Ray P. Rust (Note: Rust served as acting president from March 1, 1974, to January 1, 1975.)	1974–1975
7	Landrum P. Leavell II (Note: Although Leavell retired effective December 31, 1994, he remained interim presient through December 31, 1995.)	1975–1995
8	Charles S. Kelley	1996–2019
9	James K. Dew	2019–present

== Academics ==
=== Accreditation ===
New Orleans Baptist Theological Seminary is accredited by the Commission on Colleges of the Southern Association of Colleges and Schools to award associate, bachelor's, master's, and doctoral degrees. The graduate programs are also accredited by the Association of Theological Schools in the United States and Canada. NOBTS is also an accredited institutional member of the National Association of Schools of Music and has authorization to operate in the State of Florida.

=== Extension centers ===
Graduate Centers	Undergraduate Centers
Clinton, Mississippi	
Birmingham, Alabama	Birmingham, Alabama
Atlanta, Georgia	Atlanta, Georgia
Blue Mountain, Mississippi	

== Archaeology ==
=== Timnah ===
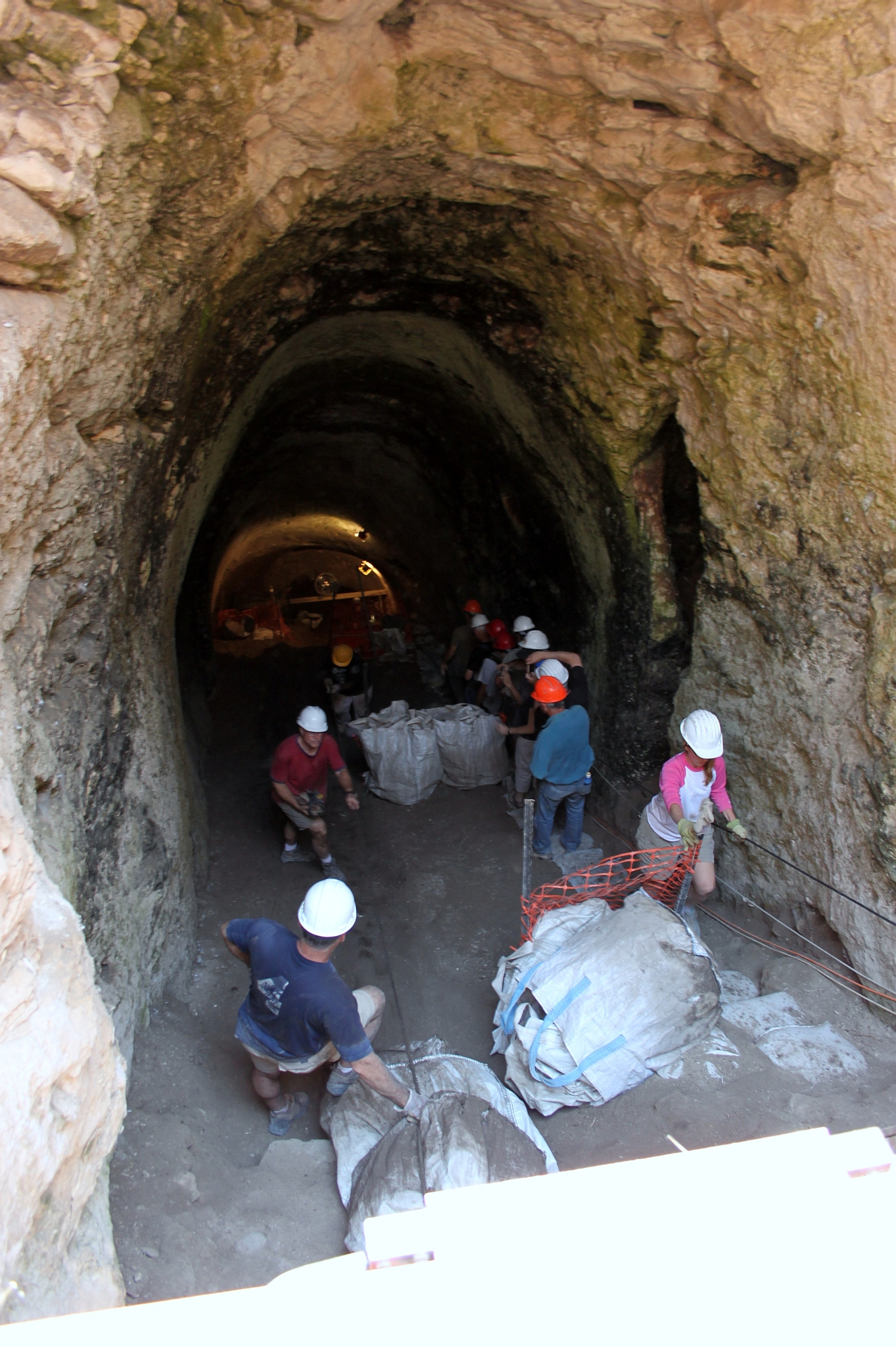
June 3, 2011, ongoing works to clear the Bronze Age water system at Gezer, originally excavated by Macalister.

Between 1977 and 1979, George L. Kelm was serving as professor of Biblical Backgrounds and Archaeology at NOBTS when he and Amihai Mazar uncovered biblical Timnah, Tel Batash in the Sorek Valley of Israel.

=== Gezer ===
In 2010 a team from NOBTS launched an effort to clear a Canaanite water shaft at Tel Gezer in Israel in cooperation with the Israeli Nature and Parks Authority and the Israeli Antiquities Authority. Gezer was first explored by R.A. Stewart Macalister over a hundred years earlier, but he did not complete a study of the water system because a freak storm refilled the system with debris and Macalister abandoned the effort.

The NOBTS excavation has been chronicled in multiple sources including the Biblical Archaeology Review and the Baptist Press. In 2011 Dennis Cole, Dan Warner and Jim Parker from NOBTS led another team in an attempt to finish the effort.

== Notable alumni ==
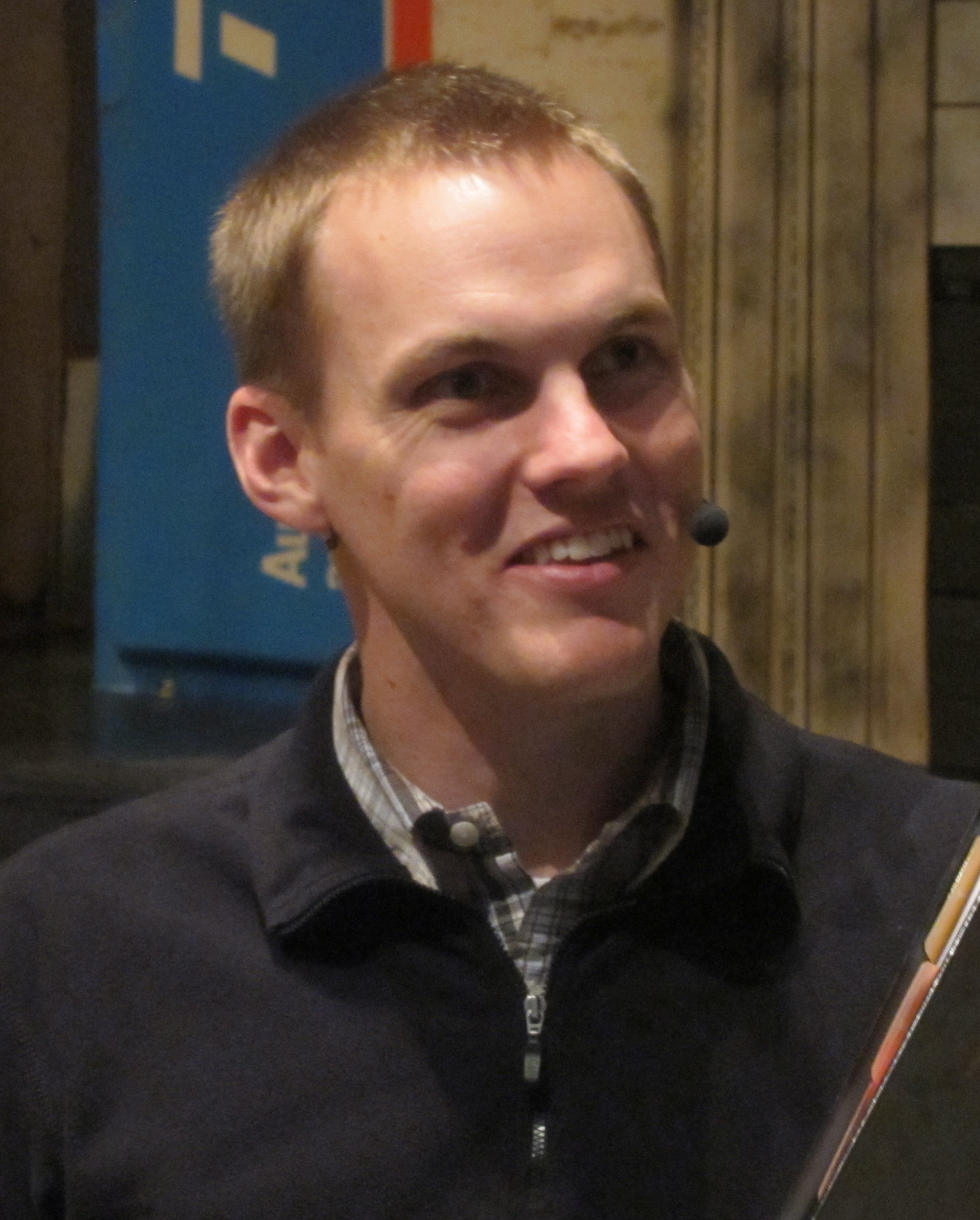
David Platt - former president of the International Mission Board, American Pastor and author of Radical

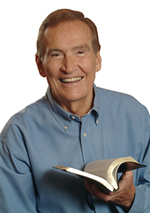
Adrian Rogers, former president of the Southern Baptist Convention, pastor of Bellevue Baptist Church

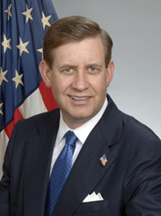
David A. Sampson, former United States Deputy Secretary of Commerce, president and CEO of the Property Casualty Insurers Association of America (PCI).

- William Leon Clark, deputy chief of chaplains of the United States Air Force 1966-1968.
- Grady C. Cothen, author, university and seminary president, pastor, state convention executive secretary-director of the Southern Baptist Convention
- Raleigh Kirby Godsey, president of Mercer University (1979–2006)
- G. Earl Guinn (1912-2004), president Louisiana College from 1951 to 1975
- Richard Land, former president of Southern Evangelical Seminary outside Charlotte, North Carolina
- Russell D. Moore, former president of the Ethics & Religious Liberty Commission of the Southern Baptist Convention
- J. Randall O'Brien, president of Carson-Newman College in Jefferson City, Tennessee
- Paige Patterson, former president of Southwestern Baptist Theological Seminary
- David Platt, former president of the International Mission Board (2014-2017); pastor-teacher of McLean Bible Church (2017-); pastor of The Church at Brook Hills (2006-2014); author of Radical
- Adrian Rogers, former president of the Southern Baptist Convention (1979–1980 and 1986–1988); pastor of Bellevue Baptist Church (1972-2005); founder of Love Worth Finding
- Anis Shorrosh (1933–2018), Palestinian Evangelical Christian author, speaker, and pastor
- Argile Smith (born 1955), former J. D. Grey professor of preaching at NOBTS
- Jerry Vines, former president of the Southern Baptist Convention (1989–1990); pastor of First Baptist Church of Jacksonville (1982-2006).

=== Politics ===
- Doug Collins, member of the United States House of Representatives from Georgia, chaplain in the U.S. Air Force Reserve.
- Mike Keown, member of the Georgia House of Representatives
- Stacey Pickering (born 1968), former state auditor of Mississippi
- David A. Sampson, former United States deputy secretary of commerce; president and CEO of the Property Casualty Insurers Association of America (PCI).
- Laurie Schlegel, member of the Louisiana House of Representatives
- Jeremy Lee Yancey, former Mississippi state senator and unsuccessful candidate for state treasurer of Mississippi.

== Notable faculty ==
- John T. Christian, Baptist preacher, author and educator
- Benjamin Harlan, internationally-known arranger and composer of choral and keyboard works
- George L. Kelm, discovered and excavated ancient Timnah between 1977 and 1979 while at NOBTS
- Clark Pinnock, Christian theologian, apologist and author. He was Professor Emeritus of Systematic Theology at McMaster Divinity College.
- Frank Stagg, theologian
