= Frontline (ministry) =

- Location: 8925 Leesburg Pike, Vienna, VA
- Country: United States
- Denomination: Non-denominational, Evangelical Christian
- Website: www.frontlinedc.com

History
- Founded: 1994
- Founder(s): Ken Baugh, Lon Solomon

Clergy
- Pastor(s): Todd Phillips, John McGowan

Frontline was the young adult ministry of McLean Bible Church, a non-denominational evangelical Christian church with campuses throughout the Washington, DC metropolitan area. Frontline was started in 1994 and has an average weekly attendance of over 2500 between its multiple campuses. John McGowan is the current Director and Teaching Pastor for Frontline. In early 2011 John stepped up for Todd Phillips, Frontline's previous Teaching Pastor. Todd Phillips taught at Lake Pointe Church; a multi-site church outside of Dallas, Texas, from 2011 to 2013, after which he deconstructed from Christianity and became an agnostic atheist.

== History ==
McLean Bible Church, one of the largest churches in the Washington, DC region, launched Frontline in October 1994 as a Sunday evening worship service. Since inception, the goal of Frontline is to minister to young adults, ages 18 – 35, in the nation’s capital region through worship, small group fellowship and volunteer opportunities.

Initially, Lon Solomon, the senior pastor of McLean Bible Church, preached during the services . During the summer of 1995, the director of Frontline, Ken Baugh, began to preach during the services while Solomon was on vacation for the summer. Baugh, the former Young Adults Pastor at Saddleback Church in California, was a success and remained the permanent teaching pastor. Baugh oversaw steady growth of this new ministry from an average attendance of 300 in 1995 to 2000 in 2000. The new worshippers credited this growth to Baugh’s efforts to make Frontline relevant to young adults through music, sermons and videos.

Ken Baugh became pastor of Coast Hills Community Church in California, which led to Todd Phillips’ promotion to pastor of Frontline in January 2005. Phillips had launched successful young adult ministries in Austin, Kerrville and San Antonio, Texas for the previous 10 years. Frontline continues to grow in membership, number of small groups, regular events and volunteer opportunities.

== Community Campuses ==
In spite of a large campus in Vienna, VA, McLean Bible Church realized that a single location might not effectively reach the entire region. Under a new growth strategy, the church began to start “community campuses” for both Frontline and McLean Bible Church. The first of these campuses opened at the Rosslyn Spectrum in Arlington, VA for a Frontline Arlington Monday evening service in January 2007 and in May 2009 launched a campus in Silver Spring. Frontline holds three services weekly between the three campuses. The Sunday evening service at the Tysons Campus averages 2,000 people and the Monday evening service at the Arlington Campus averages 500 people. There is also an internet campus that broadcasts the Frontline Service each Sunday, along with the 9:00 am, 10:45 am and 12:30 pm services.

== Ministries ==
Frontline is different from the young adult ministries in many other churches in that it has its own distinct ministry teams, small groups and missions trips.

- Global Impact – Frontline’s Global Impact ministry began in 1997 and offers 20 – 25 international short-term mission trips annually. Global Impact also offers 15 -20 short-term trips to inner-city Washington, DC called “Intencity Trips.”
- Small Groups – Small Groups are groups of 8-12 people who meet usually once a week to study the Bible together. Frontline regularly promotes Small Groups as a way to get connected and develop relationships.
- The Gathering – The Gathering is Frontline’s College Ministry. The Gathering has regular services on the campuses of American University in Washington, DC, George Mason University in Fairfax, VA and the University of Maryland in College Park, MD. The Gathering also has a presence on the campuses of George Washington University and Georgetown University, both in Washington, DC.
- One of Frontline’s largest ministry events is the annual Turkey Outreach right before Thanksgiving. The Turkey Outreach collects, packages and distributes free turkey dinners to needy families throughout the Washington, DC region for the Thanksgiving Holiday. It was originally started by a single person and their small group and has grown to feeding 7,000 families in 2008.
