= David Platt (pastor) =

American Southern Baptist pastor (1978-)

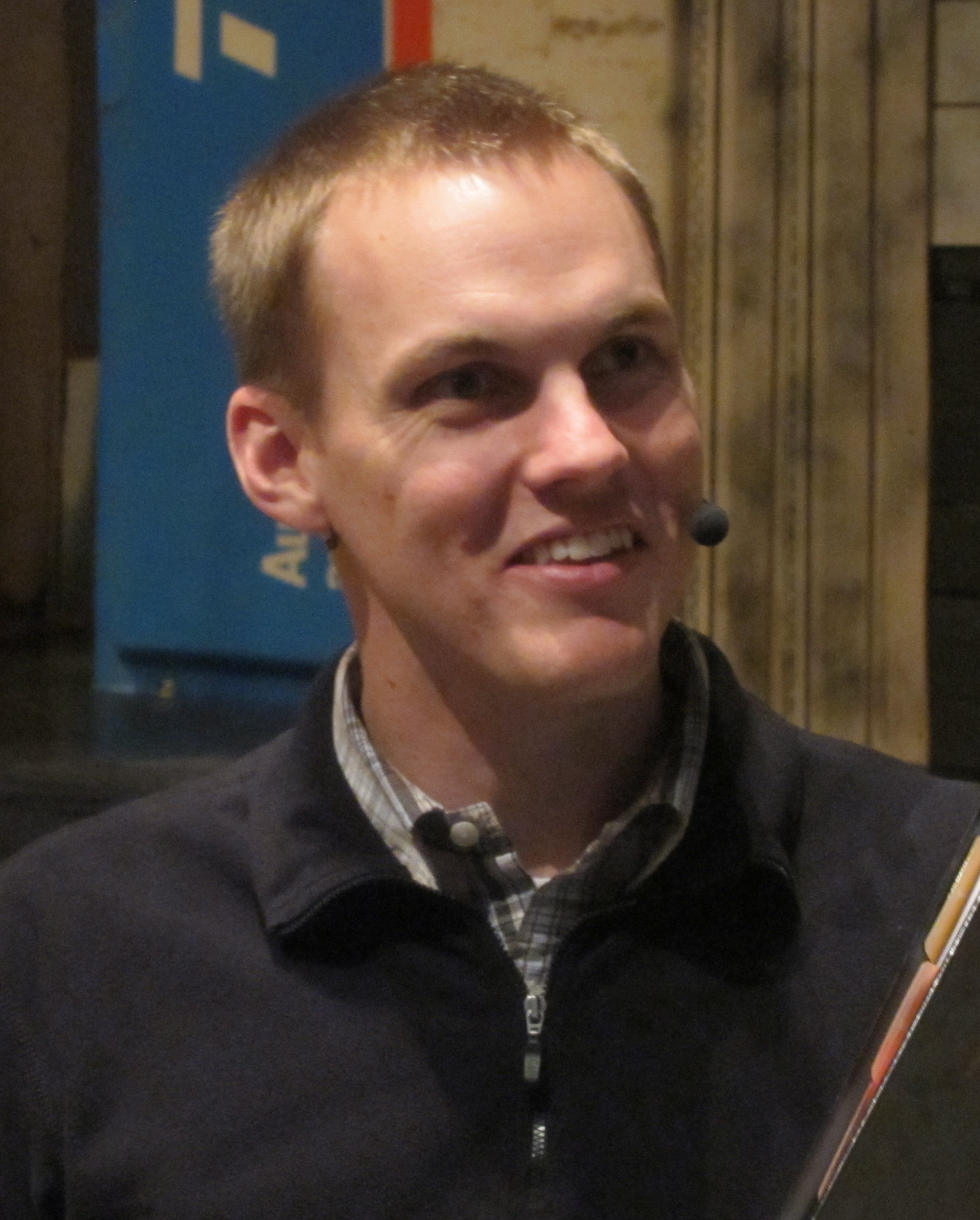
- Platt in 2010
- Born: David Joseph Platt; July 11, 1978 (age 48); Atlanta, Georgia, U.S.
- Occupations: Pastor, religious writer, university teacher
- Years active: 2005–present
- Notable work: Radical
- Spouse: Heather
- Children: 6
- Theological work
- Era: Early 21st century
- Tradition or movement: Baptist (Southern Baptist)

David Platt (born July 11, 1978) is an American evangelical Baptist pastor. He was senior pastor at the Church at Brook Hills in Birmingham, Alabama, from 2006 to 2014. At the time he was the youngest megachurch pastor in the United States. From 2014 to 2017, Platt was president of the International Mission Board. He became pastor-teacher at McLean Bible Church in 2017. In late 2025 he is lead pastor at McLean. He is the author of the 2010 New York Times Best Seller Radical: Taking Back Your Faith from the American Dream.

== Early life and education ==
David Joseph Platt was born on July 11, 1978 in Atlanta, Georgia.

Platt earned a B.A. in journalism from the University of Georgia; he then studied at New Orleans Baptist Theological Seminary, where he earned a Ph.D.

== Career ==
David Platt served at New Orleans Baptist Theological Seminary as Dean of Chapel and Assistant Professor of Expository Preaching and Apologetics. He was serving at Edgewater Baptist Church in New Orleans when the parsonage where he lived flooded during Hurricane Katrina.

In 2006, Platt was introduced as the new senior pastor of The Church at Brook Hills in Birmingham, Alabama. At age 27, he became the youngest megachurch pastor in the United States.

In 2014, Platt was elected president of the Southern Baptist Convention's International Mission Board. The International Mission Board is one of the largest missionary sending organizations in the world.

In February 2017, Platt began serving as interim teaching pastor at McLean Bible Church in Vienna, Virginia. During this time he continued in his primary role as president of the International Mission Board. In September of that year, Platt was introduced as pastor-teacher of McLean Bible Church. In February 2018, he announced his resignation from the IMB on the hiring of his successor.

In June 2019, Platt made national headlines when then president Donald Trump visited McLean Bible Church unannounced, during a Sunday service, and Platt prayed for him on stage. During Platt's tenure at McLean, the church underwent a legal dispute regarding Platt's leadership, including with regard to its financial ties and partnership with the Southern Baptist Convention.

A two-part documentary about Platt was released in 2024.

=== Published works ===
Platt’s publications include;

- Platt, David (2010). Radical: Taking Back Your Faith from the American Dream.
- Radical Together (2011)
- A Radical Idea: Unleashing the People of God for the Purpose of God (2011)
- The Radical Question and a Radical Idea (2012)
- Follow Me (with Francis Chan (2013)
- What Did Jesus Really Mean when He said Follow Me? (2013)
- A Compassionate Call to Counter Culture in a World of Poverty, Same-Sex Marriage, Racism, Sex Slavery, Immigration, Abortion, Persecution, Orphans and Pornography (2015)
- Something Needs to Change: A Call to Make Your Life Count in a World of Urgent Need (2019)
- Before You Vote: Seven Questions Every Christian Should Ask
- Exalting Jesus series
- How to Read the Bible
- All you want for Christmas
- The Counter Culture series of books
- Don’t Hold Back
- The Name of Jesus

== Awards and recognition ==
Platt's book, Radical: Taking Back Your Faith from the American Dream, is an Evangelical Christian Publishers Association bestseller.

== Personal life ==
David is married to Heather and they have six children.
