= Grady C. Cothen =

- Born: August 2, 1920; Poplarville, Mississippi, USA
- Died: May 19, 2017 (aged 96); Ridgeland, Mississippi
- Resting place: Roseberry Cemetery in Mascot, Tennessee
- Education: Mississippi College, New Orleans Baptist Theological Seminary
- Occupations: Clergyman: Southern Baptist Convention
- Spouse: Martha E. "Betty" Major Cothen
- Children: 2

Grady C. Cothen Sr. (2 August 1920 – 19 May 2017) was an American pastor, state convention executive secretary-director for the Southern Baptist Convention, author, university president, and seminary president.

Cothen was born in Poplarville, Mississippi, to the Reverend and Mrs. J. H. Cothen. He married Martha E. (Bettye) Major and had two children.

He attended Hattiesburg High School, graduated from Baptist-affiliated Mississippi College in Clinton, and received his master's degree from New Orleans Baptist Theological Seminary. He was ordained into Baptist ministry in 1939 in Richton, Mississippi. Cothen died on 19 May 2017 in Ridgeland, Mississippi, at the age of ninety-six.

== Service ==
- Chaplain, U. S. Navy, 1944–46
- Pastor: White Oak Baptist Church, Chattanooga, Tn. 1946-48
- Olivet Baptist Church, Oklahoma City, Ok. 1948-59
- First Baptist Church, Birmingham, Al. 1959-61
- Executive Secretary, Southern Baptist General Convention of Ca. 1961 – 1966.
- President of Oklahoma Baptist University 1966-70
- President of New Orleans Baptist Theological Seminary 1970-74
- President of Southern Baptist Sunday School Board 1975-84

== Awards ==
- Distinguished Alumnus Award, New Orleans Baptist Theological Seminary
- Order of The Golden Arrow, Mississippi College
- E. Y. Mullins Denominational Service Award, Southern Baptist Theological Seminary
- Listed in Who's Who in America from 1970 until retirement.

== Honorary degrees ==
- Doctor of Divinity, Mississippi College
- Doctor of Divinity, California Baptist College
- Doctor of Laws, William Jewell College
- Doctor of Humanities, University of Richmond
- Doctor of Humane Letters, Campbell University
- Doctor of Humane Letters, Oklahoma Baptist University

== Books ==
- The God of The Beginnings
- Faith and Higher Education
- Unto All The World: Bold Mission
- What Happened to The Southern Baptist Convention?
- The New SBC: Fundamentalism's Impact on The Southern Baptist Convention

== President of OBU ==
During Cothen's tenure as president the Howard Residence was completed, the Oklahoma Baptist University Authority was incorporated, the National Council for Accreditation of Teacher Education accredited all OBU programs, and The Geiger Center for University Life was completed.

Preceded by James R. Scales	Oklahoma Baptist University President; 1966 - 1970	Succeeded by William G. Tanner
