= J. Randall O'Brien =

American Author

J. Randall O'Brien is an American author. He was the twenty-second president of Carson-Newman College in Jefferson City, Tennessee after being unanimously elected by the board of trustees in July 2008. He was the executive vice-president and provost at Baylor University. He was a popular theology professor and received many teaching awards during his tenure at Baylor. O'Brien retired from Carson-Newman in 2018 and was succeeded by Charles Fowler.

During an interview in January 2009 with the Knoxville News-Sentinel, O'Brien identified five priorities to help make Carson-Newman become the top Christian university in the world: clarify and fulfill the mission and vision, visionary leadership, accountable management, relationship building, and fundraising. O'Brien was awarded the George W. Truett Distinguished Church Service Award by Baylor University's Alumni Association, which honored those connected to Baylor who demonstrate Truett's love of Christ and churches.

== Biography ==
O'Brien is a native of McComb, Mississippi. He graduated from Mississippi College. He received his doctor of theology degree from New Orleans Baptist Theological Seminary and a masters of sacred theology from Yale University Divinity School. O'Brien was a full-time pastor most recently at Calvary Baptist Church in Little Rock, Arkansas.

O'Brien has written many articles and books on theology. He published I Feel Better All Over Than I Do Anywhere Else...: and Other Stories to Tickle Your Soul in 2022, and Set Free By Forgiveness: The Way to Peace and Healing in 2005.

O'Brien is married to Kay Donaho O'Brien who is a social work professor. They have two daughters named Alyson Elise and Shannon, and a son named Kris. He served in Vietnam in the 101st Airborne Division and received the Bronze Star and United States Air Medal.
