= Review & Expositor =

- Discipline: Theology, biblical studies
- Language: English
- Edited by: Mark E. Biddle

Publication details
- History: 1904-present
- Publisher: SAGE Publishing for Review & Expositor, Inc. (United States)
- Frequency: Quarterly

Standard abbreviations
- ISO 4: Rev. Expo.

Indexing
- ISSN: 0034-6373
- OCLC no.: 1696862

Links
- Journal homepage

Review & Expositor is a Baptist academic journal of theology.

== History ==
Review & Expositor was first published in 1904. Until 1996, it was published by the faculty of the Southern Baptist Theological Seminary, but after that it was published by an independent board, sponsored by three seminaries: McAfee School of Theology at Mercer University, Baptist Theological Seminary at Richmond and Truett Seminary at Baylor University. After an issue of Review & Expositor in 2001 on the subject of sexuality was deemed by its faculty to be "irresponsible" and "contrary to sound theological scholarship", Truett Seminary cut its ties with the journal. Campbell University Divinity School became the third sponsor, but in 2019 BTSR closed due to financial problems.
