= Benjamin Harlan =

Benjamin Harlan is a Professor of Church Music at New Orleans Baptist Theological Seminary. He became the second dean of the School of Church Music at Southwestern Baptist Theological Seminary in 1995. He is an internationally known arranger and composer of choral, keyboard and handbell works. He is also known for his hymn arrangements for organ, choir, and congregation.
