= Evelyn Stagg =

American scholar on classical studies (1914-2011)

Evelyn Stagg (née Evelyn Owen) (July 9, 1914 – February 28, 2011) was a trailblazer for Southern Baptist women in ministry. She was an authority on classical studies, which led to her extensive research on the cultural/historical status and treatment of women in the ancient world, and in the world into which Jesus was born. Married to eminent Baptist theologian Dr. Frank Stagg for 66 years, she was a native of Ruston, Louisiana.

She was co-author of the book Woman in the World of Jesus, which the authors intended to address women's role in the church today by exploring:

- the status of woman in the world Jesus entered;
- the position of Jesus with respect to women; and
- the status of woman in the church as reflected in the New Testament.

The book was said to have inspired a generation of women preparing for ministry in the Southern Baptist Convention until more conservative voices seized control of the denomination and went on record against women’s ordination.

As a young woman, Evelyn wanted to pursue a seminary degree and become ordained. When husband Frank was enrolled in the Master of Divinity program at Southern Seminary in Louisville in the 1930s, Evelyn was permitted to take the same classes and sit for all the exams, but she could not receive credit since the seminary did not grant degrees to women. However, she performed so well that she was asked to grade the papers of the beginning students in New Testament Greek. Sarah Frances Anders wrote that the course report would list the men by name and add that "one unnamed woman" made one of the few A's. Throughout her marriage, she worked behind the scenes as the first reader and unofficial editor for dozens of journal articles and 10 books written by her husband. Evelyn graduated from Louisiana College in 1934. In later years Mercer University awarded her an honorary degree to recognize her early scholastic achievement and lifetime of shared ministry.

In 1983 she was one of 33 women who helped found an organization known today as Baptist Women in Ministry. Pam Durso, the group’s current executive director, called her a “strong advocate for Baptist women ministers.”

Evelyn taught in the public schools of New Orleans, LA and served as a reader for the Publishing House for the Blind, Louisville. She was a founding member of Women in Ministry, a group created to help women ordained for the pastorate.
