= Frank Stagg (theologian) =

American theologian, author and pastor (1911–2001)

Frank Stagg (October 20, 1911 – June 2, 2001) was a Southern Baptist theologian, seminary professor, author, and pastor over a 50-year ministry career. He taught New Testament interpretation and Greek at New Orleans Baptist Theological Seminary from 1945 until 1964 and at the Southern Baptist Theological Seminary in Louisville, Kentucky from 1964 until 1978. His publications, recognitions and honors earned him distinction as one of the eminent theologians of the past century. Other eminent theologians have honored him as a "Teaching Prophet."

No one...has ever taken the New Testament more seriously than Frank Stagg, who spent his entire life wrestling with it, paying the price in sweat and hours in an unrelenting quest to hear the message expressed in a language no longer spoken and directed toward a cultural context so foreign to the modern reader.

— Malcolm Tolbert, Southeastern Baptist Theological Seminary

== Personal ==
Dr. Frank Stagg was born October 20, 1911, on his grandfather's rice farm near the small community of Eunice, Louisiana. Although the family name comes from an English ancestor, the Stagg family was of French Catholic descent, commonly called Cajuns. His grandfather and his uncle were the first of the Staggs to become Evangelical Christians. His uncle became a preacher who ministered in the native "Cajun" dialect. Frank was proud of his Louisiana French heritage and of his upbringing in the home of a Baptist deacon and Sunday School teacher.

In his junior year at Louisiana College, Frank met his wife: Evelyn Owen of Ruston, Louisiana, who would become an integral part of his future endeavors. They married in 1935 and raised three children.

== Beliefs ==
Counted among the "best-known progressive activists," Stagg addressed a variety of contemporary issues. These included civil rights, gender equity, Vietnam, the First Gulf War, ecumenism and aging. He also argued for the Bible's relevance. "The Bible is relevant," Stagg said. "We don't have to make it relevant." He said that the First Gulf War presented the ideal opportunity for Southern Baptists to "reassess and reject" the just war doctrine and embrace pacifism as the appropriate Christian response to all wars. He opposed Reformed points of doctrine such as predestination and other Calvinist beliefs in Southern Baptist life.

== Library collection ==
Through the years, Dr. Stagg amassed an extensive library and wealth of knowledge and scholarship in the form of correspondence, writings, articles, speeches, commentaries, book reviews, photographs, sermon notes and even private musings. The papers of Dr. Frank Stagg (1938–1999) now reside at Samford University in Birmingham, Alabama.

== Recognition and honors ==
Frank Stagg is included in various lists of distinguished twentieth century Baptist theologians: E. Y. Mullins, W. T. Connor, W. O. Carver, Frank Stagg, W. W. Stevens, Dale Moody, Dallas Roark, James Wm. McClendon, Morris Ashcraft, E. Frank Tupper, Warren McWilliams, A. J. Conyers, and Curtis Freeman. He also has been called "one of the foremost interpreters of the New Testament among Baptists in the twentieth century."

At the Louisville seminary he held the James Buchanan Harrison Chair of New Testament Theology.

The Stagg-Tolbert Forum for Biblical Studies is an annual event named in his honor. It is designed to make excellence in biblical scholarship accessible to the lay person.

== Education ==
1934	B. A. Louisiana College
1938	Th.M., Southern Baptist Theological Seminary
1943	Ph.D., Southern Baptist Theological Seminary
1955	LL.D., Louisiana College
1948	Advanced Study, Union Theological Seminary in the City of New York, New York
1953-54	Advanced Study, University of Edinburgh, Scotland and University of Basel, Switzerland
1967-68	Advanced Study, University of Tübingen, Germany

== Professional ==
1941-44	Pastor; First Baptist Church, DeRidder, Louisiana
1945-64	Professor of New Testament and Greek; New Orleans Baptist Theological Seminary
1964-77	James Buchanan Harrison Professor of New Testament; The Southern Baptist Theological Seminary
1977-82	Senior Professor of New Testament; The Southern Baptist Theological Seminary
1982	Emeritus Professor; The Southern Baptist Theological Seminary

== Publications ==
=== Books ===
The Book of Acts: The Early Struggle for an Unhindered Gospel. Nashville: Broadman Press, 1955.

Exploring the New Testament. Nashville: Convention Press, 1961.

New Testament Theology. Nashville: Broadman Press, 1962.

Studies in Luke's Gospel. Nashville: Convention Press, 1967.

The Holy Spirit Today. Nashville: Broadman Press, 1973.

Polarities of Man's Existence in Biblical Perspective. Philadelphia: Westminster Press, 1973.

Woman in the World of Jesus, with Evelyn Stagg. Philadelphia: Westminster Press, 1978.

Galatians and Romans. "Knox Preaching Guides," ed. John H. Hayes. Atlanta: John Knox Press, 1980.

The Bible Speaks on Aging. Nashville: Broadman Press, 1981.

=== Contributions to other books ===
"He that Judgeth Me." In More Southern Baptist Preaching, ed. H. C. Brown Jr., pp. 104–112. Nashville: Broadman Press, 1964.

"How I Prepare My Sermons." In More Southern Baptist Preaching, ed. H. C. Brown Jr., pp. 104–106. Nashville: Broadman Press, 1964.

"What and Where Is the Church?" In What Can You Believe? ed. David K. Alexander and C. W. Junker, pp. 27–34. Nashville: Broadman Press, 1966.

"Glossolalia in the New Testament." In Glossolalia: Tongue Speaking in Biblical, Historical, and Psychological Perspective by Frank Stagg, E. Glenn Hinson, and Wayne E. Oates, pp. 20–44. Nashville: Abingdon Press, 1967.

"Matthew." In The Broadman Bible Commentary, ed. Clifton J. Allen, vol. 8, pp. 612–653. Nashville: Broadman Press, 1969.

"Rights and Responsibilities in the Teachings of Paul." In Emerging Patterns of Rights and Responsibilities Affecting Church and State, pp. 37. Washington D.C.: Baptist Joint Committee on Public Affairs, 1969.

"Authentic Morality and Militarism." In Proceedings of the 1970 Christian Life Commission Seminar, pp. 45–50. Nashville: Christian Life Commission of the Southern Baptist Convention, 1970.

"Explain the Ending of the Gospel of Mark, Mark 16:17-18." In What Did the Bible Mean, ed. Claude A. Frazier, pp. 122–125. Nashville: Broadman Press, 1971.

"Philippians." In The Broadman Bible Commentary, Clifton J. Allen, pp. 178216. Nashville: Broadman Press, 1971.

"Playing God with Other People's Minds." In Should Preachers Play God, ed. Claude A. Frazier, pp. 115–129. Independence: Independence Press, 1973.

"The English Bible." In How to Understand the Bible, by Ralph Herring, Frank Stagg, et al., pp. 148–163. Nashville: Broadman Press, 1974.

"Interpreting the Bible." In How to Understand the Bible, by Ralph Herring, Frank Stagg, et al., pp. 49–61. Nashville: Broadman Press, 1974.

"Sources in Biblical Writings," In How to Understand the Bible, by Ralph Herring, Frank Stagg, et al., pp. 134–147. Nashville: Broadman Press, 1974.

"The Text and Canon of the Old Testament." In How to Understand the Bible, by Ralph Herring, Frank Stagg, et al., pp. 106–117. Nashville: Broadman Press, 1974.

"The Text and Canon of the New Testament." In How to Understand the Bible by Ralph Herring, Frank Stagg, et al., pp. 118–133. Nashville: Broadman Press, 1974.

"A Continuing Pilgrimage." In What Faith Has Meant to Me, cd. Claude A. Frazier, pp. 146–156. Philadelphia: Westminster Press, 1975.

"Adam, Christ, and Us." In New Testament Studies: Essays in Honor of Ray Summers in His Sixty-Fifth Year, ed. Huber L. Drumwright and Curtis Vaughan, pp. 115–136. Waco: Baylor University Press, 1975.

"Establishing a Text for Luke-Acts." In 1977 Seminar Papers, Society of Biblical Literature Book of Reports, pp. 45–58. Missoula, Montana: Scholars Press, 1977.

"A Whole Man Made Well." In The Struggle for Meaning, ed. by William Powell Tuck, pp. 71–79. Valley Forge PA: Judson Press, 1977.

"Biblical Perspectives on Women" (with Evelyn Stagg). In Findings of the Consultation on Women in Church-Related Vocations, ed. Johnni Johnson, pp. 716. Nashville: Southern Baptist Convention, 1978.

"What is Truth?" In Science, Faith and Revelation, An Approach to Christian Philosophy, ed. Robert E. Patterson, pp. 239–260. Nashville: Broadman Press, 1979.

"Understanding Call to Ministry." In Formation for Christian Ministry, ed. Anne Davis and Wade Rowatt Jr., pp. 23–38. Louisville: Review & Expositor, 1981.

"Preaching from Luke-Acts." In Biblical Preaching: An Expositor's Treasury ed. James W. Cox, pp. 296–305. Philadelphia: Westminster, 1983.

"Preaching from the Sermon on the Mount." In Biblical Preaching: An Expositor's Treasury, ed. James W. Cox, pp. 212–229. Philadelphia: Westminster, 1983.

=== Encyclopedia article ===
"Women in New Testament Perspective" (with Evelyn Stagg). In Encyclopedia of Southern Baptists, ed. Lynn Edward May Jr., Vol. 4, pp. 255–260. Nashville: Broadman Press, 1982.

=== Journal articles ===
"The Purpose and Message of Acts." Review & Expositor 44 (1947) 321.

"The Motif of First Corinthians." Southwestern Journal of Theology 3 (1960) 15–24.

"The Christology of Matthew." Review & Expositor 59 (1962) 457–468.

"The Farewell Discourses: John 13-17." Review & Expositor 62 (1965) 459–472.

"The Gospel in Biblical Usage." Review & Expositor 63 (1966) 513.

"The Holy Spirit in the New Testament." Review & Expositor 63 (1966) 135–147.

"The Journey Toward Jerusalem in Luke's Gospel." Review & Expositor 64 (1967)499-512.

"An Analysis of the Book of James." Review & Expositor 66 (1969) 365–368.

"Exegetical Themes in James 1 and 2." Review & Expositor 66 (1969) 391–402.

"The Lord's Supper in the New Testament." Review & Expositor 66 (1969) 514.

"Orthodoxy and Orthopraxy in the Johannine Epistles." Review & Expositor 67(1970)423-432.

"The Abused Aorist." Journal of Biblical Literature 91 (1972) 222–231.

"Salvation in Synoptic Tradition." Review & Expositor 69 (1972) 355–367.

"Freedom and Moral Responsibility without License or Legalism." Review & Expositor 69 (1972) 483–494.

"Introduction to Colossians." Theological Educator 4 (1973) 716.

"A Teaching Outline for Acts." Review & Expositor 71 (1974) 533–536.

"The Unhindered Gospel." Review & Expositor 71 (1974) 451–462.

"Interpreting the Book of Revelation." Review & Expositor 72 (1975) 331–343

"The Great Words of Romans." Theological Educator 7 (1976) 941–1002.

"The Plight of the Jew and the Gentile in Sin: Romans 1:18-3:20." Review & Expositor 73 (1976) 401–413.

"Prophetic Ministry Today." Review & Expositor 73 (1976) 179–189.

"Rendering to Caesar What Belongs to Caesar: Christian Engagement with the World." Journal of Church and State 18 (1976) 951–1013.

"Rendering to God What Belongs to God: Christian Disengagement from the World." Journal of Church and State 18 (1976) 217–232.

"Biblical Perspectives on the Single Person." Review & Expositor 74 (1977) 519.

"Southern Baptist Theology Today: An Interview," Theological Educator 3 (1977) 15–36.

"Textual Criticism for Luke-Acts." Perspectives in Religious Studies 5 (1978) 152–165.

"The Domestic Code and Final Appeal: Ephesians 5:21—6:24." Review & Expositor 76 (1979) 541–552.

"The New International Version: New Testament." Review & Expositor 76 (1979) 377–385.

"The Mind in Christ Jesus." Review & Expositor 77 (1980) 337–347.

"The New Testament Doctrine of the Church." Theological Educator 12 (1981) 42–56.

"Reassessing the Gospels." Review & Expositor 78 (1981) 187–203.

"Eschatology: A Southern Baptist Perspective." Review & Expositor 79 (1982) 381–395.

=== Southern Baptist curriculum and periodical articles ===
Syllabus for Study and Questions for Examination on New Testament 112: From Jesus to Paul. Nashville: Seminary Extension Department, 1954.

"Nature of the Church—Conditions of Admission." The Baptist Student 43 (February 1964) 53–56.

Nature of the Church—Constituents." The Baptist Student 43 (February 1964) 50-53.

"Nature of the Church—Individuality and Corporateness." The Baptist Student 43 (February 1964) 56–58.

"Church As the Body of Christ—the Ecclesia." The Baptist Student 43 (March 1964) 50–53.

"The Church As the Body of Christ—the Local Embodiment." The Baptist Student 43 (March 1964) 56–58.

"The Church As the Body of Christ—Unity and Diversity." The Baptist Student 43 (March 1964) 53–56.

"The Church As the Koinonia of the Spirit—Demands." The Baptist Student: 43 (April 1964) 54–56.

"The Church As the Koinonia of the Spirit—Dimensions." The Baptist Student 43 (April 1964) 52–54.

"The Church as the Koinonia of the Spirit—Primacy." The Baptist Student 43 (April 1964) 56–58.

"The Church in the World—the Church and the World." The Baptist Student 43 (May 1964) 55–57.

"The Church in the World—the Life and work of the Church." The Baptist Student 43 (May 1964) 52–54.

"The Church in the World—the Ministry of the Church." The Baptist Student 43 (May 1964) 50–52.

The Study Guide for Seminary Extension Course New Testament. Theology 436 (Teacher's Edition). Nashville: Seminary Extension Department, 1964.

"1965: The Church Proclaiming." Church Administration 1 (February 1965) 22–24.

"Speaking in Tongues ... A Biblical Interpretation." The Baptist Student 45 (May 1966)43-45.

The Study Guide for Seminary Extension Course New Testament 202: The Gospel According to Luke. Nashville: Seminary Extension Department, 1967.

"The Radicality of Jesus Christ." The Baptist Student 49 (June 1970) 79.

"Facts About Civil Disorder." The Baptist Program 30 (August 1970) 30–35.

The Study Guide for Seminary Extension Course New Testament Theology 436. Nashville: Seminary Extension Department, 1971.

"The Bible Speaks on Poverty." Outreach 1 (July, 1971) 24–25, 30.

"The Book of Acts" Advanced Bible Study 2 (April–June 1972) [13 lessons on Acts].

"The Gospel of Paul in First Corinthians." Outreach 3 (September 1973) 30–31.

"The Gospel in Romans 18." Outreach 4 (October 1973) 30–31.

"The Gospel According to Paul Applied in Romans 12-14." Outreach 4 (November 1973) 42–43.

"The Radicality of Jesus Christ." The Student (January 1975) 811 (reprinted from The Baptist Student, June 1970).

"The Church—God's New People." Adult Bible Teacher 5 (April–June 1975) [13 lessons on Ephesians].

"The Kingdom of God: Freedom and Fulfillment Under the Rule of God." Come Alive 6 (January–March 1976) 22–33.

"Free to Be: Salvation: Becoming A Person in Christ." Come Alive 6 (April–June 1976) 44–55.

"First Century Demons." Illustrator 4 (Winter 1977) 58–60.

"The Kingdom of Heaven in Matthew." Illustrator (1978) 36ff.

"What We Believe About Sin." Source 9 (January 1979) 14–39.

"Eschatology." One in Christ 17 (1981) 255–270.

"The Bible Speaks on Aging." Search 12 (Summer 1982) 611.

"Humanism and a Free Society." Report from the Capital 37 (September 1982) 45.

=== Book reviews ===
An Introduction to New Testament Textual Criticism, by J. Harold Greenlee. Review and Expositor 62 (Spring 1965) 230–231.

The Text of the New Testament: Its Transmission, Corruption and Restoration, by Bruce M. Metzger. Review and Expositor 62 (Spring 1965) 230.

Only the House of Israel? by T. W. Manson. Review and Expositor 62 (Spring 1965) 231.

A Beginner's Reader Grammar for New Testament Greek, by E. C. Colwell and E. W. Tune. Review and Expositor 62 (Fall 1965) 485–487.

The Central Message of the New Testament, by Joachim Jeremías. Review and Expositor 63 (Winter 1966) 98–99.

Colossians: The Church's Lord and the Christian's Liberty - An Expository Commentary with a Present-Day Application, by Ralph P. Martin. Review & Expositor 71 (Winter 1974) 107.

Trajectories Through Early Christianity XII, by James M. Robinson. Review & Expositor 71 (Summer 1974) 395–397.

Milton and the Book of Revelation: the Heavenly Cycle, by Austin Dobbins. Review & Expositor 73 (Winter 1976) 77–78.

Anti-Semitism in the New Testament, by Samuel Sandmel. Review & Expositor 76 (Spring 1979) 258–261.

The Crucifixion of the Jews: The Failure of Christians to Understand the Jewish Experience, by Franklin H. Littell. Review & Expositor 84 (Winter 1987) 122–123.

The Jewish Reclamation of Jesus. by Donald A. Hagner. Review & Expositor 84 (Winter 1987) 123–124.
