= Radical (Platt book) =

2010 book by David Platt

Radical: Taking Back Your Faith from the American Dream
- Author: David Platt
- Language: English
- Genre: Christian literature
- Publisher: Multnomah Books
- Publication date: 2010
- Publication place: United States
- Pages: 240
- ISBN: 978-1-60142-221-7

Radical: Taking Back Your Faith from the American Dream is a 2010 Christian book written by David Platt, and is a New York Times Bestseller.

== Reception ==
Radical is an Evangelical Christian Publishers Association bestseller.

Publishers Weekly said,

WaterBrook Multnomah Publishing Group’s Radical: Taking Back Your Faith from the American Dream by David Platt, is now in its 14th print run, with 250,000 copies in print. Since its May 4 publication date, Radical has been on the New York Times Paperback Advice list for eight weeks, reaching #5. The book also has appeared on the CBA Top 50 bestsellers list at #3 and at #2 on the CBA Christian Living list
