= Frontline (The Bill) =

"Frontline" was a three-part storyline in the long-running police procedural British television series The Bill. Broadcast in 2008, the storyline is significant in the show's history as it was the final plot to feature the death of an on-screen character, PC Emma Keane, which came in the first part of the plot.

== Prelude ==
Unlike storylines during the serialized era of 2002-2005, the Frontline plot did not have multiple long-running plots in the buildup. However, one ongoing storyline was that of the posse run by Sergeant Callum Stone. While Stone was not borderline corrupt, he used certain methods that were not legal. He was seen as a maverick when he arrived, but one of his biggest secrets came weeks after his arrival in the Fall of 2007. Stone was part of a uniform search for a missing girl, Chloe Parks, but the search came to a tragic end when she was found dead at the bottom of a fire escape at an abandoned hospital. Things got personal for Stone when footage emerged of the girl several years earlier stating she was sexually abused by her father Martin (Chris Walker). When he failed to confess in the interview, PC Will Fletcher, Family Liaison Officer for the Parks family in the case of Chloe's death, went after him when he assaulted his wife. Finding Martin atop the fire escape where Chloe committed suicide, Stone forces Fletcher off the negotiation before goading Martin into jumping. Fletcher was mortified, but Stone callously told him "What goes around, comes around". After initial harsh feelings between the two, Fletcher sought Stone's help in the Spring of 2008 when PC Sally Armstrong demanded justice for a suspected rapist who attacked the sister of one of Armstrong's friends. Reminding Stone of his "alternative methods", Fletcher got him on his side, and after the man gave evidence against a suspected drug dealer, Stone joined the arrest team before telling the suspect who was responsible for calling the cops. Taking Fletcher, Armstrong, and PC Benjamin Gayle to the home of the suspected rapist, they lay in wait until a group of thugs burst in and savagely assaulted him, responding to the callout and arresting the men responsible. Happy with their alternative justice, the four officers formed a posse. A few weeks later, Armstrong was paired with PC Emma Keane when a burglar was seriously assaulted during a home invasion. Dejected that the victims may end up being prosecuted for defending their home, Armstrong took Keane to Stone to ask if there were any alternatives. Stone was furious that Armstrong asked Keane to get involved, as her father was a DCI at the DPS. Keane, however, thought Stone was harboring a crush on her and began undermining him. After forcing her way onto an undercover operation, Stone laid down the law as she put herself in danger, attempting to kiss him before pulling out as he was drawn in, stating that her suspicions about him fancying her were confirmed.

== Synopsis ==
=== Part 1: Shockwave ===
The events of Shockwave take place the day after the undercover operation, Armstrong notices Keane tease Stone as he told her to be careful whilst out on patrol. As Armstrong tried to get Keane to talk about their interaction, an explosion is heard nearby, turning onto a street to witness a second blast take out a street market. As they tended to the casualties, Armstrong called in for assistance. During the rescue efforts, Keane found a man masquerading as a doctor who sexually assaulted a woman trapped in a car during the blast. Keane was then assaulted during her attempts to arrest the man, leaving Stone determined to track the man down, who also gave false medical advice to a victim who was rushed into the hospital unconscious as a result. The relief was left in shock by the events, drawing similarities to the 7/7 attacks 3 years earlier. As the day progressed, Armstrong and Keane paired to track down the phony doctor but ended up arguing when Keane pressed for details on Stone's posse. Splitting up, they found the man and apprehended him, although Stone arrived to witness him assault Keane once again. As they argued about the legality of Stone's actions, Keane accused him of being corrupt and stormed off. Whilst patrolling, Keane discovered smoke pouring from a building and started an evacuation. As she evacuated, DCI Jack Meadows called her to inform her that SO15 (Counter-Terrorism) revealed the bombs that detonated were fertilizer-based. In the series, as backup rushed to her aid, Keane came across a man with a suspicious package. As her colleagues closed in, the bomb detonated, finding Keane seriously injured. As Stone battled in vain to save her life, her devastated colleagues watched on as Keane succumbed to her injuries.

=== Part 2: Aftershock ===
The events of Aftershock take place the morning after Keane's death. The uniform relief is in shock, none more so than Sergeant Stone and PC Armstrong. Superintendent John Heaton introduces DI Karen Lacy (Liz May Brice) of SO15 to DCI Meadows and the rest of CID, who has been tasked with investigating what was a total of 8 deaths between the first two bombings and the third that killed Keane. The first clue comes in the form of a letter delivered to the station "To the friends and colleagues of PC Keane, wrong place, wrong time". The second was James Marfield (Henry Miller), a friend of the first victim, Michael Gilcrest, whose nightclub was blown up by the first of the two bombs. Discovering a link to a pornography site, it was revealed that Gilcrest had links to the owner of the photocopy shop that was a target of the second bombing. DC Mickey Webb investigated the owner of the business blown up where Keane died, Jeff Bowman (Mark Moraghan), and later discovered he was linked to right-wing extremism, despite his business being an immigration charity, found via a clue from the bomber captioned "Lesson Two: Fascist in Hiding". A note to victim Gilcrist was traced to an internet café, and a suspect was soon arrested, however, Sergeant Stone had to stop an emotional PC Armstrong from attacking the man; later in the day, Stone's own aggressions came to the fore when he tried attacking Sergeant Dale Smith for suggesting he was attracted to Keane. In the series, the man arrested was paranoid and twitchy, refusing to comment, and a new clue emerged with a letter pointing them in direction of a delivery made to their suspect's neighbor. However, the house was empty, but they soon realized they had been ambushed when DC Kezia Walker stood on a pressure pad that triggered a bomb. As the bomb squad attended to defuse the device, they discovered the device was meant to frame their man in custody, now revealed to be convicted identity thief Carl Adams (Mark Bagnall). When DC Grace Dasari linked a repeated clue, "The Elvis Four", she realized it was an anagram of the four evils, a belief of the four worst things made more prevalent by the internet (pornography, racism, identity theft, and pedophilia). Realizing 3 of the 4 had been targeted, the investigating officers concluded that the bomber had one more attack planned.

=== Part 3: End Game ===
The events of End Game take place a week after Keane's death. With the criminal's ideals identified, DC Dasari invited bomb targets Jeff Bowman and Carl Adams to the station to be questioned about their links, along with Michael Gilcrest's friend James Marfield. Out on the streets, PCs Fletcher, Gayle, and Armstrong attended a break-in at an industrial unit, and when Fletcher tried calling the person who made the report, he unintentionally set off a flour bomb that left Armstrong shaken but unharmed. A memory stick found at the scene was used to tell the investigating team they had four hours to find a bomb before a sex offender would be blown up. Stone, back at work after his attack on Smithy, joined his posse as they investigated a software company that was linked to Bowman and Marfield. A name came from their searches, Colin Moore, and Smithy paired with DC Webb to put surveillance on his brother Bill. As he was arrested, Webb identified Colin Moore as James Marfield, making DCI Meadows realize the prime suspect was under their noses all along. With Colin already gone from the station, the need to find him heightened. The Child Exploitation and Online Protection division sent a list to Sun Hill, which they cross-referenced with Colin Moore's clients, and they discovered the name Peter Waverley on both lists. In the series, as his home and business were searched, Bill Moore revealed Colin searched pedophilia online to ensnare sex offenders, but Bill's wife caught him and assumed the wrong thing, and that the last bomb was personal. Waverley revealed his wife had the package and was heading to collect their children from school. Stone ducked out of Keane's funeral to find Mrs. Waverley, and as he and Webb found her car, they worked to rescue her baby from the back seat. As Meadows and Dasari found Colin, they tried to talk him down, but he set the bomb off anyway, however, Stone was able to rescue the baby before Mrs. Waverley's car exploded. Stone then attended Keane's funeral, telling her friends, family, and colleagues that her killer had been brought to justice.

== Aftermath ==
The aftermath of the events lead to two-character exits, one immediately after and the other later in the year. PC Reg Hollis was mentioned to have resigned in Lucky Lucky Lucky, the episode that came after Frontline: End Game. Actor Jeff Stewart was due to be written out in 2008 after controversially being axed by show producers, but Stewart was so devastated at losing a role he'd been in for 24 years that he attempted suicide by slitting his wrists on set. While Stewart's last on-screen scene came weeks earlier, his exit was explained away by a decision to resign in the wake of Keane's death. The other exit was that of Inspector Gina Gold; having been a hard-as-nails, iron-fisted manager during her time on the show, the character of Gold began to crumble under pressure out of fear of losing another officer, having been close friends with Keane. This came to light in the episode Lifesaver in the series, in which Sgt. Stone and PC Armstrong rescued a suicidal woman from her car that had crashed into the River Thames, and again in the episode Demolition Girl when Armstrong is almost crushed by the debris of an imploding tower block tried to stop a woman running back into the building. In An Honour to Serve- Part 2, Gold was mortified to think Sergeant Dale Smith, her best friend, was killed in an armed siege. After Smithy was rescued by SO19 to end the siege, Gold handed in her resignation and retired.

== Cast ==
- Supt. John Heaton - Daniel Flynn
- DCI Jack Meadows - Simon Rouse
- Insp. Gina Gold - Roberta Taylor
- DI Karen Lacy - Liz May Brice
- DI Samantha Nixon - Lisa Maxwell
- Sgt. Callum Stone - Sam Callis
- Sgt. Dale Smith - Alex Walkinshaw
- PC Emma Keane - Melanie Gutteridge
- PC Sally Armstrong - Ali Bastian
- PC Will Fletcher - Gary Lucy
- PC Benjamin Gayle - Micah Balfour
- DC Kezia Walker - Cat Simmons
- DC Mickey Webb - Chris Simmons
- DC Grace Dasari - Amita Dhiri
- Colin Moore - Henry Miller
- Jeff Bowman - Mark Moraghan
- Carl Adams - Mark Bagnall
