= Lon Solomon =

American Christian pastor and evangelist

Lon Solomon is American evangelical Christian pastor and the founder of Lon Solomon Ministries, a non-profit ministry.

== Early life ==
Lon Solomon was born and raised in a Jewish home in Portsmouth, Virginia.

Solomon earned a B.S. degree in chemistry (1971) from the University of North Carolina at Chapel Hill, a Th.M. degree in Hebrew and Old Testament (1975, summa cum laude) from Capital Bible Seminary, an M.A. degree (1978) in Near Eastern Studies from Johns Hopkins University and a Doctorate of Divinity degree (2005) from Liberty Baptist Theological Seminary.

== Ministry ==
In 1980, Solomon became the senior pastor at McLean Bible Church in the Virginia suburbs of Washington, D.C. He served in that capacity until September 2017. The birth of Solomon's disabled daughter Jill led to his initiating and organizing Jill's House, a ministry to serve the needs of disabled children and their families.

Solomon has been on the board of Jews for Jesus since 1987, where he now serves as chairman of the board's executive committee.

In September 2002, Solomon was appointed by President George W. Bush to serve in his administration as a member of the President's Committee on Intellectual Disabilities, a position which he held until 2006.

== Bibliography ==
- Brokenness: How God Redeems Pain and Suffering
- The 23rd Psalm for the 21st Century
- Future Hope: A Jewish Christian Look at the End of the World
