= Operation Front Line =

U.S. national security operation

- Location: United States
- Type: Law enforcement operation
- Budget: Unknown
- Organised by: ICE
- Outcome: Unknown
- Arrests: Unknown
- Limited public information available

Operation Front Line was an initiative of U.S. Immigration and Customs Enforcement (ICE), a division of the Department of Homeland Security, that operated from the months leading up to the 2004 presidential election through the 2005 Presidential Inauguration.

== Overview ==
Limited information about the program has been publicly disclosed. A cost–benefit analysis by the Office of Management and Budget described the program as being implemented "to address potential vulnerabilities in immigration and trade systems relative to the national security of the United States." An ICE spokesperson stated that the program "focused on immigration violators that may have imposed an enhanced public safety or national security threat."

The program's cost, arrest criteria, and overall scope remain undisclosed.

== See also ==
- Illegal immigration to the United States
