= Louis Stulman =

Louis Stulman (born 1953 in Baltimore, Maryland) is a professor of religious studies and chair of the Religious Studies and Philosophy Department at the University of Findlay, Findlay, Ohio. He earned an M.Phil. and Ph.D. in Hebrew Bible from Drew University and has done post-doctoral work at the University of Michigan. He has served as an instructor in Hebrew at Drew University, the Gale and Harriette Ritz Professor of Old Testament at Winebrenner Theological Seminary, as well as the positions noted above at The University of Findlay.

Stulman has served on the SBL Award Committee, A. R. Pete Diamond Award for Integrative Scholarship, Society of Biblical Literature, 2019–2021; general editor (Old Testament), Core Biblical Studies Series, Abingdon Press, 2012–20; Writing/Reading Jeremiah Steering Committee, Society of Biblical Literature, 2018–21; associate editor, Journal of Biblical Literature, 2007–2009, 2010–2012; president, Eastern Great Lakes, Society of Biblical Literature, 2013–14; vice president, Eastern Great Lakes, Society of Biblical Literature, 2012–13; steering committee, Writing/Reading Jeremiah Group, Society of Biblical Literature, 2010–17; co-chairperson, Writing/Reading Jeremiah Group, Society of Biblical Literature, 2007–2009; founding co-chairperson with Kathleen M. O'Connor: The Book of Jeremiah Consultation/Group, Society of Biblical Literature, 1992–1999.

Stulman’s awards for teaching include the “Outstanding Educator, the “Founder’s Academic Excellence Award for Faculty,” and "Excellence in Education."

Stulman's recent work on the Hebrew Bible is influenced by art criticism, trauma studies, and postcolonialism. He has written/edited numerous books and articles. His scholarly articles have appeared in the Journal of Biblical Literature, among others, and he has been a contributor to the New Interpreter’s Dictionary of the Bible (Abingdon), Feasting on the Word (WJK), Eerdmans Dictionary of the Bible, and the New Oxford Annotated Bible, 5th Edition. He served as a translator and author of study notes on the book of Jeremiah in the Common English Bible (CEB). He is also general editor (Old Testament) of the Abingdon Press series Core Biblical Studies.

Stulman also formerly played guitar for The Star Sapphires And The Primes, a soul band based in Baltimore.

== Publications ==
- The Oxford Handbook of Jeremiah. Edited with Edward Silver (New York: Oxford University Press, 2021).
- “The Book of Jeremiah,” in the New Oxford Annotated Bible, 5th Edition, Michael Coogan, eds. et al. (Oxford University Press, 2018), 1069–1161.
- “The Book of Jeremiah,” Common English Study Bible, (Nashville, TN; Christian Resources Development Corp, 2013), 1205–1300.
- Jeremiah (Dis)Placed: New Directions in Writing/Reading Jeremiah. Edited with A. R. Pete Diamond (New York and London: T & T Clark, 2011).
- You are My People: An Introduction to Prophetic Literature. With Hyun Chul Paul Kim (Nashville: Abingdon Press, 2010).
- Inspired Speech: Prophecy in the Ancient Near East. Essays in Honour of Herbert B. Huffmon. Edited with John Kaltner (New York and London: T & T Clark, 2004, 2005, 2008 paperback).
- Abingdon Old Testament Commentaries: Jeremiah. (Nashville: Abingdon Press, 2005).
- Troubling Jeremiah. Edited with A. R. Pete Diamond and Kathleen M. O’Connor (Sheffield: Sheffield Academic Press, 1999).
- Order Amid Chaos. (Sheffield: Sheffield Academic Press, 1998).
- The Prose Sermons of the Book of Jeremiah: A Redescription of the Correspondences with Deuteronomistic Literature in the Light of Recent Text-Critical Research. (Atlanta: Scholars Press, 1986; reprinted, 1996).
- The Other Text of Jeremiah. A Reconstruction of the Hebrew Text Underlying the Greek Version of the Prose Sections of Jeremiah. (New York and London: University Press of America, 1985).
- Recent Scholarly Articles and Essays
- “Writing to Survive: The Voice Returns in Jeremiah’s Subversive Sefer,” in Historical Settings, Intertextuality, and Biblical Theology: Essays in Honor of Marvin A. Sweeney, ed., Paul Kim et al. (Mohr Siebeck, 2022), 285–302.
- “A Critical Introduction,” (with Edward Silver), in The Oxford Handbook of Jeremiah, eds. Louis Stulman and Edward Silver (Oxford University Press, October 2021), 1–22.
- “De historiske taberes Gud,” in Gud og os – Teologiske læsninger af Det Gamle Testamente i det 21. Århundrede (in English: God and Us: Theological Readings of the Old Testament in the 21. Century). Edited by Jan Dietrich and Anne Katrine Gudme (Oslo; Bibelselskabets Forlag, 2021), 493–512.
- “Trauma not Triumph: Reading the Hebrew Bible as Disaster and Resilience Literature,” in Orthodoxy and Orthopraxis, Essays in Tribute to Paul Livermore, eds. Douglas R. Cullum and J. Richard Middleton (Pickwick Press, 2020), 65–83.
- “An Introduction,” Walter Brueggemann, Truth and Hope: Essays for a Perilous Time (WJK, February 2020).
- “The Book of Jeremiah,” in the New Oxford Annotated Bible, 5th Edition, Michael Coogan, eds. et al. (Oxford University Press, 2018), 1069–1161.
- “Prophetic Words and Acts as Survival Literature,” in The Oxford Handbook of the Prophets, edited by Carolyn J. Sharp (Oxford University Press, 2016), 319—333.
- “Reflections on the Prose Sermons in Jeremiah: Duhm and Mowinckel’s Contribution to Contemporary Trauma Readings,” in The Bible through the Lens of Trauma, eds., Christopher Frechette and Elizabeth Boase (Semeia Studies: Atlanta: Society of Biblical Literature, 2016), 125–139.
- “My Father was a Syrian Refugee” Deuteronomy 26:5,” Journal for Preachers 40/1 (2016) 9–14.
- “Ezekiel as Disaster/Survival Literature: Speaking on Behalf of the Losers,” in The Prophets Speak on Forced Migration, eds. Mark Boda, Mark A. Leuchter et al. (SBLAIL; 2015), 133–145.
- “Art and Atrocity, and the Book of Jeremiah,” in Jeremiah Invented. Constructions and Deconstructions of Jeremiah, eds., Else K. Holt and Carolyn J. Sharp (LHBOT; New York and London, T & T Clark, 2015), 92–103.
- “First-Person Figurations of Servant and Suffering in Isaiah and Jeremiah: A Response to Mary Mills and Kathleen O’Connor,” with A. R. Pete Diamond, in Jeremiah Invented. Constructions and Deconstructions of Jeremiah, eds., Else K. Holt and Carolyn J. Sharp (LHBOT; New York and London, T & T Clark, 2015), 87–91.
- “Reading the Bible through the Lens of Trauma and Art,” in Trauma and Traumatization in Individual and Collective Dimensions: Insights from Biblical Studies and Beyond, Eve-Marie Becker et al., eds. (Studia Aarhusiana Neotestamentica; Göttingen: Vandenhoeck & Ruprecht, 2014), 176–191.
- “Foreword” to Walter Brueggemann’s Reality, Grief, Hope: Three Urgent Prophetic Tasks (Grand Rapids, Michigan and Cambridge, U.K.; Eerdmans, 2014), ix–xiii.
- “Reading the Prophets as Trauma Literature: The Legacy of the Losers,” Eastern Great Lakes Biblical Society Presidential Address; Conversations with the Biblical World 34 (2014), 1–13.
