= McLean Bible Church =

McLean Bible Church (MBC)
- MBC's Logo
- McLean Bible Church (MBC)
- Location: 8925 Leesburg Pike, Vienna, Virginia
- Country: United States
- Denomination: Non-denominational evangelical, and (allegedly) affiliated with the Southern Baptist Convention
- Website: www.mcleanbible.org

History
- Status: 501(c)(3)
- Founded: 1961; 65 years ago

Clergy
- Priest(s): David Platt, Lead Pastor
- Pastors: Wade Burnett (Executive Pastor); Nathan Reed (Tysons Campus pastor); Todd Peters (Prince William Campus Pastor); Britten Taylor (Loudoun Campus Pastor); Eric Saunders (Arlington Campus Pastor); Andrew Martínez (Montgomery County Campus Pastor)

McLean Bible Church is an evangelical megachurch based in Vienna, Virginia. It is a multi-site church, with several locations in the Washington, DC, metropolitan area. It has historically been a non-denominational church, with more recent reports suggesting affiliation with the Southern Baptist Convention.

== Background ==
McLean Bible Church (MBC) is an evangelical megachurch based in Vienna, Virginia. It is a multi-site church, with several locations in the Washington metropolitan area. It is a 501(c)(3) tax exempt organization. MBC was founded as and has been historically considered a non-denominational church, but there are more recent media and legal claims reporting its close affiliation with the Southern Baptist Convention, a matter that has led to congregational controversy.

== History ==
McLean Bible Church (MBC) was founded in Northern Virginia in 1961, by five families. Its first service was held on Easter Sunday at Chesterbook Elementary School in McLean, led by Pastor J. Albert Ford. Christian Post reporting states that MBC was founded as a nondenominational church.

In 1980, Lon Solomon, a Portsmouth, Virginia native, became the senior pastor, the congregation's fourth. In more than 35 years of leadership (as recorded in reporting by the Christian Post), the church grew from on the order of 200 members early in its history, to a weekly attendance of more than 13,500 in early 2017.

In February of 2017, Solomon stepped down from the senior pastor post. He wrote a letter indicating a continuing commitment to "walking with Christ... praying and reading God's Word... sharing Christ with people, and... preaching the Word", communicated via letter to the congregation, that he was "tired... of trying to run the demanding operations of our large and complex church", stating his fear that absent a senior pastor "fully-engaged in every level of leading our church", he might "end up hurting the very church family that I love so much"; with that letter, he announced to the congregation that he was stepping down as senior pastor (while staying on "as senior teaching pastor and a member of the Board of Elders").

In September 2017, David Platt was confirmed as the Pastor (later "Lead Pastor"), replacing Lon Solomon as the sole candidate offered to the membership. Associate Pastor Dale Sutherland was instrumental in bringing Platt to MBC.

According to a church census released in 2018, MBC claimed a weekly attendance of 10,510 people and 5 campuses in different cities. In November 2018, CBS News listed MBC as the 24th largest megachurch in the United States with about 16,500 weekly visitors. Under the leadership of Platt, MBC has created a podcast series.

On June 2, 2019, MBC made national headlines when then-President Donald Trump made an unannounced visit; after playing golf, Trump appeared at the Tyson's Corner campus, coming on stage after communion, at which time, Platt prayed for him.

In 2020, during the global pandemic, MBC moved its services online, and met physical needs for people in the greater Washington, DC area, offering free food and toiletries (where meals provided totaled 5.6 million).

There have been several lawsuits since 2021 concerning the leadership of MBC, and regarding its relationship with the Southern Baptist Convention, a matter that had been reported on since 2017. A two-part documentary about Platt was released in 2024. The documentary noted that church members had a series of concerns including, how race and Critical Race Theory were handled, how finances were handled and lack of transparency in relationships with other denominations, especially SBC.

Average weekly attendance for 2021 was 8,858, according to MBC's March 2022 Congregational Meeting Report.

As reported in the fall of 2023, a shared leadership structure for MBC was introduced featuring two lead pastors, David Platt and Mike Kelsey, the latter being the primary leader of the pastor team, with Platt focusing on "Gospel mobilization".

In late 2025 David Platt is lead pastor at McLean.

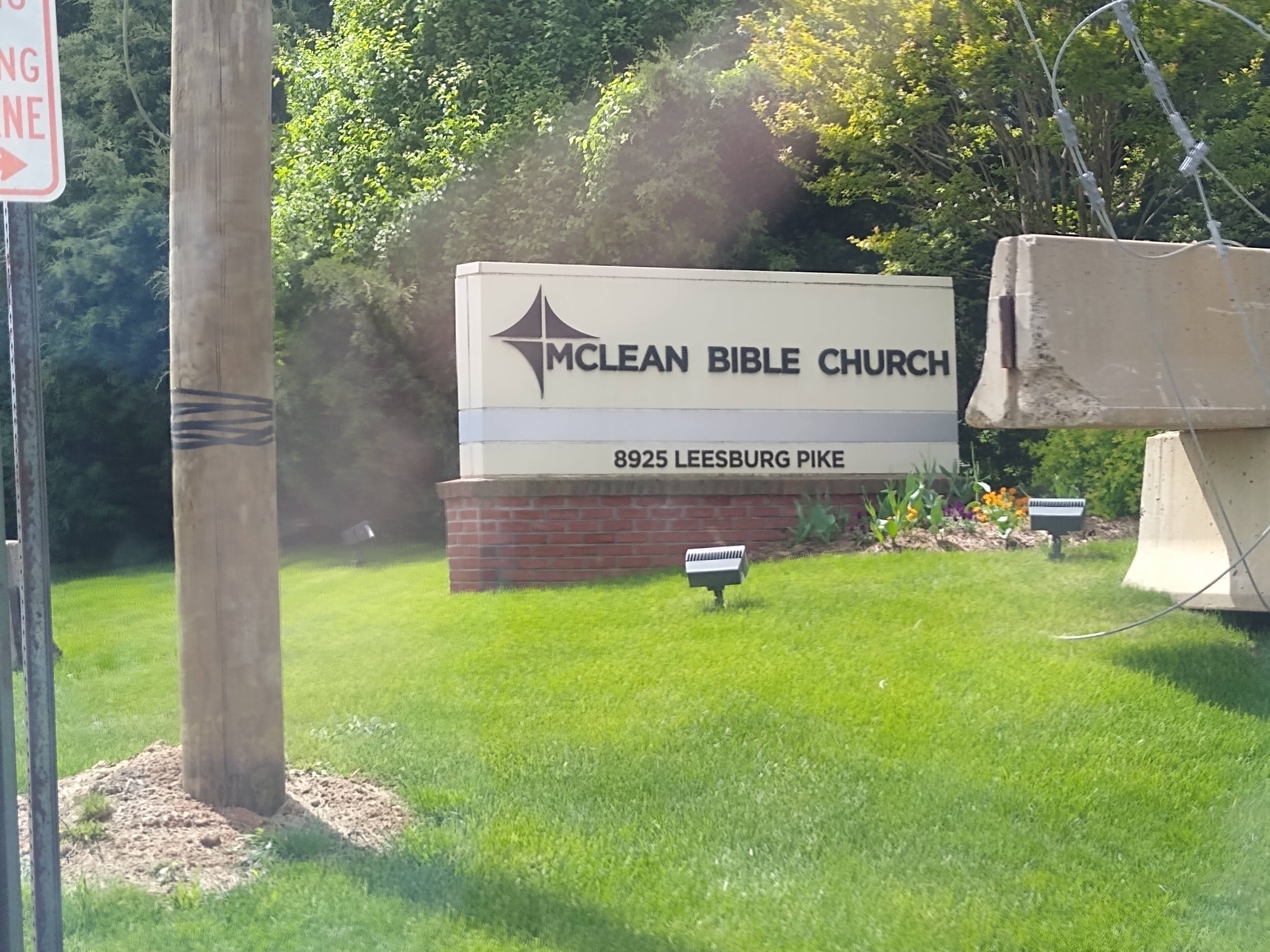
Signage at Tysons Corner Campus

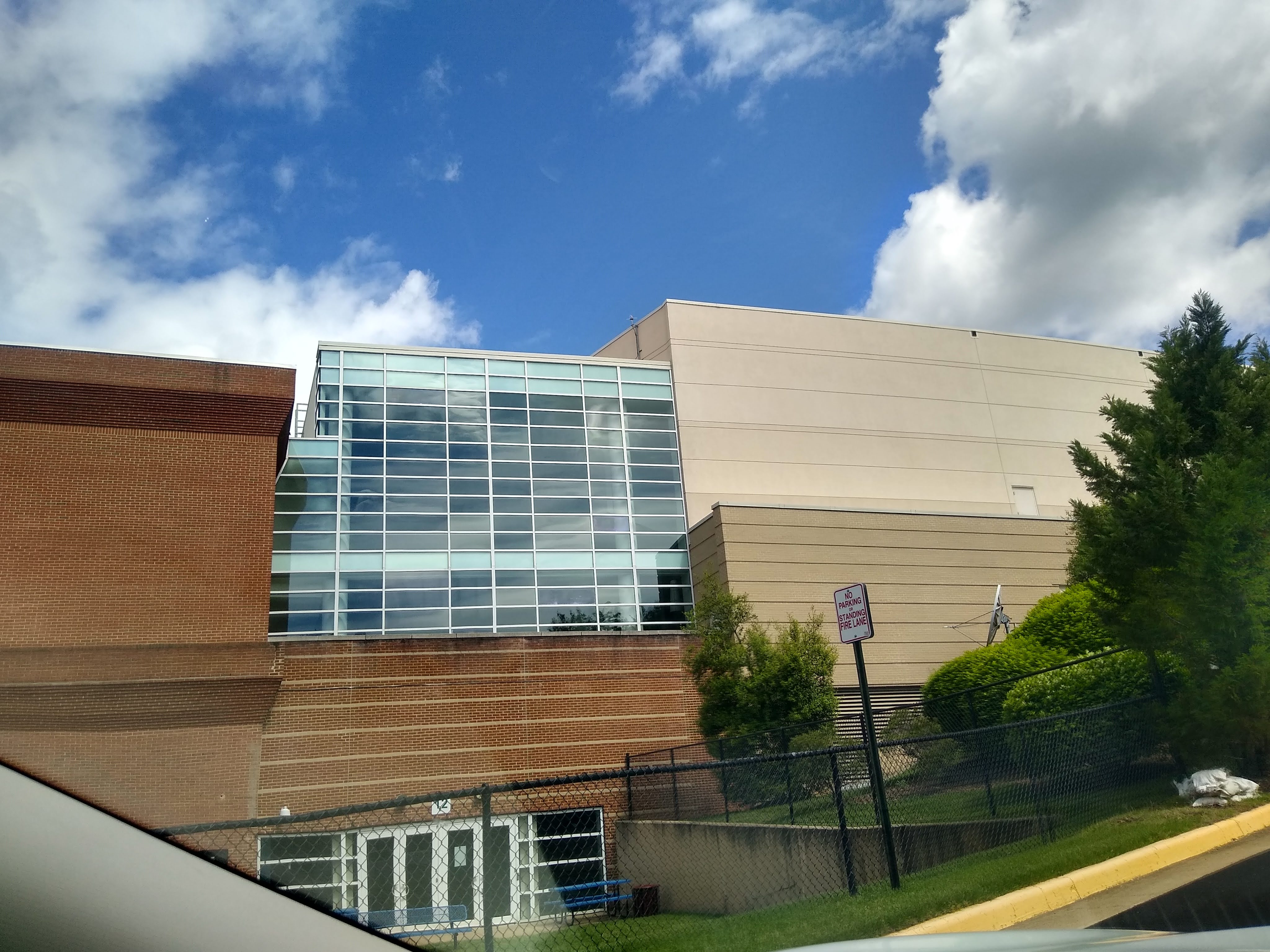
Rear view of Tyson's Campus facility

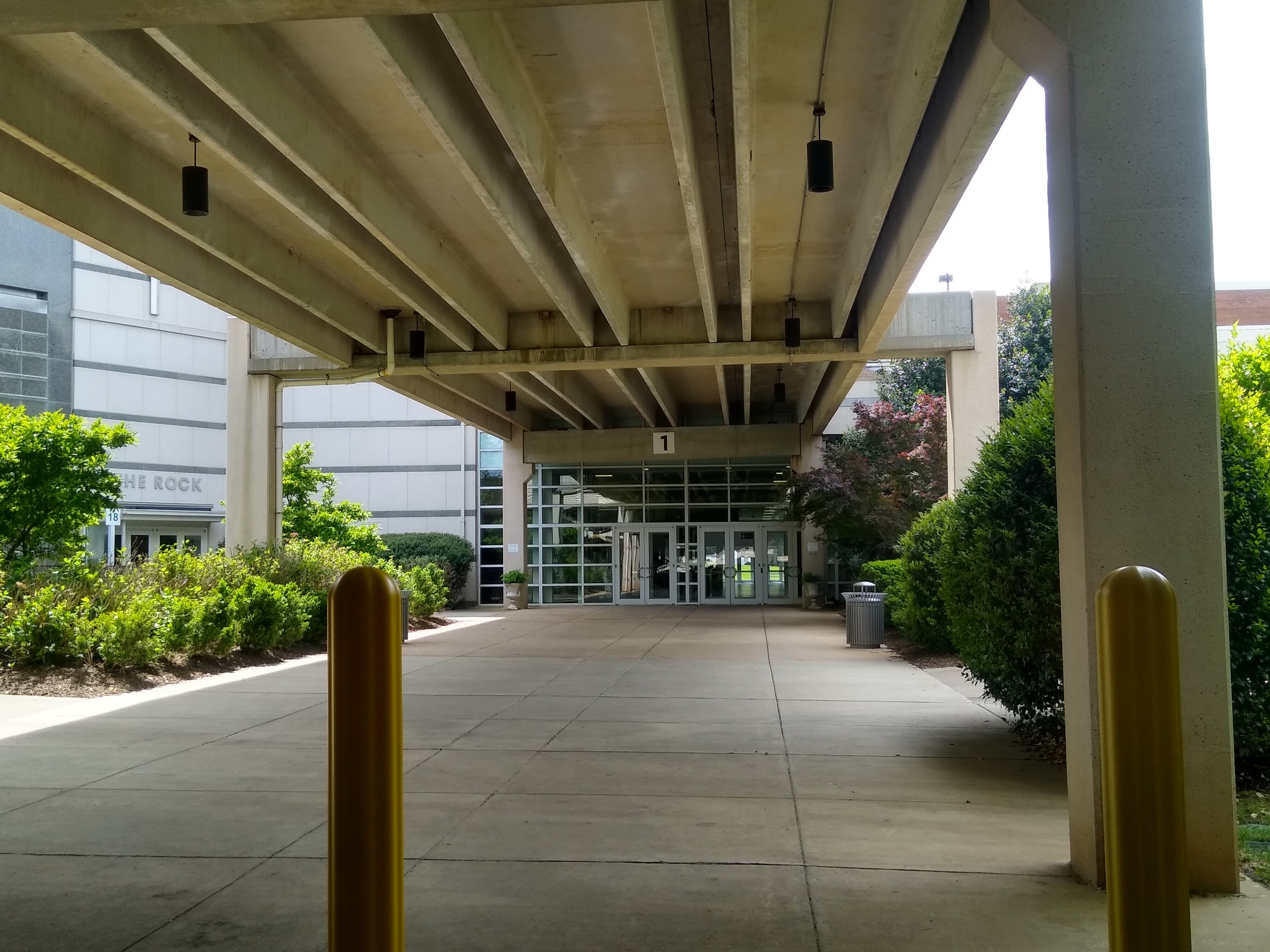
Tyson's Campus Lower Front Entrance with awning-covered walkway

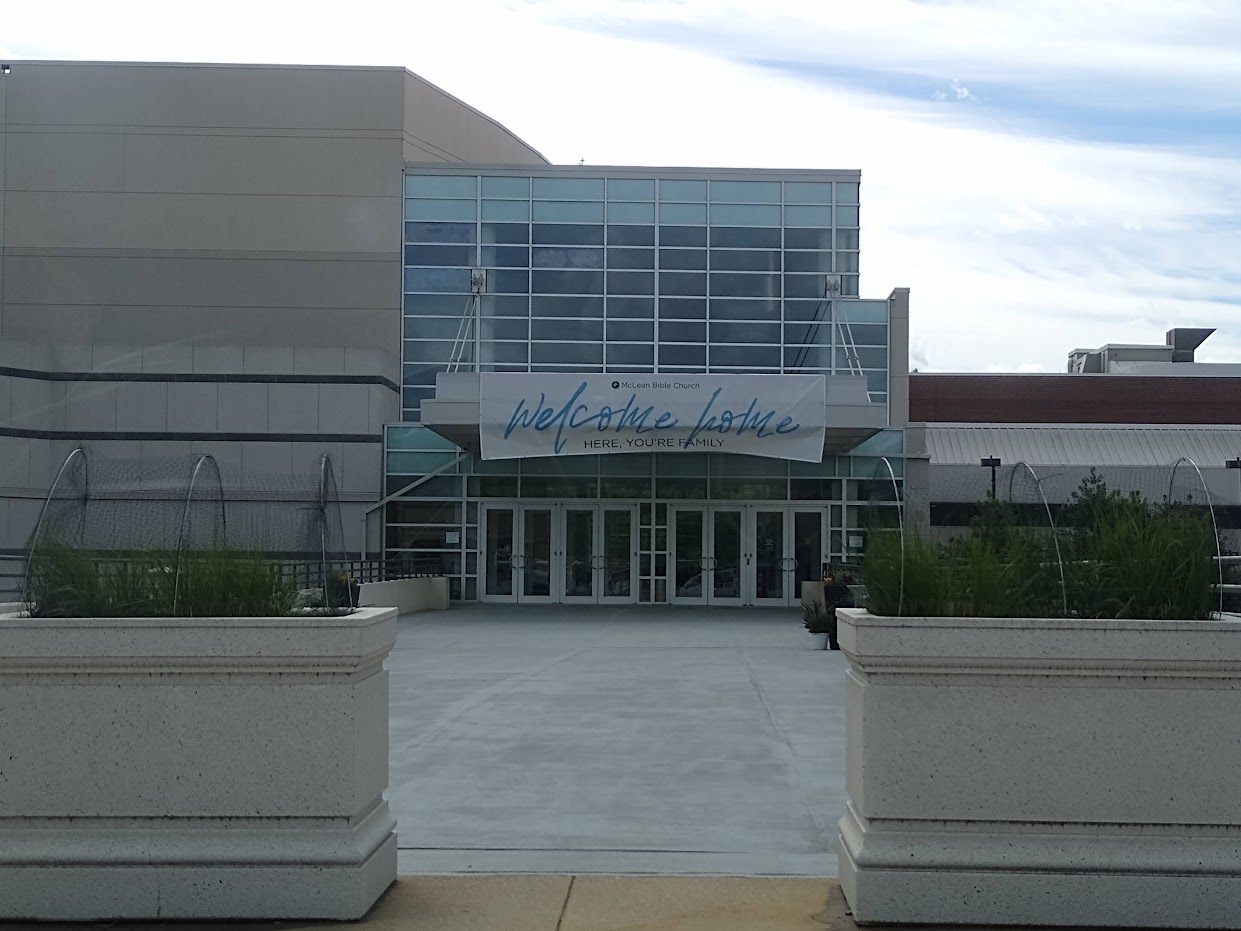
Front, upper entrance at Tyson's Corner Campus
