= Baptist Theological Seminary at Richmond =

Former seminary in Richmond, Virginia

Coordinates: 37°34′43.5″N 77°27′6.2″W

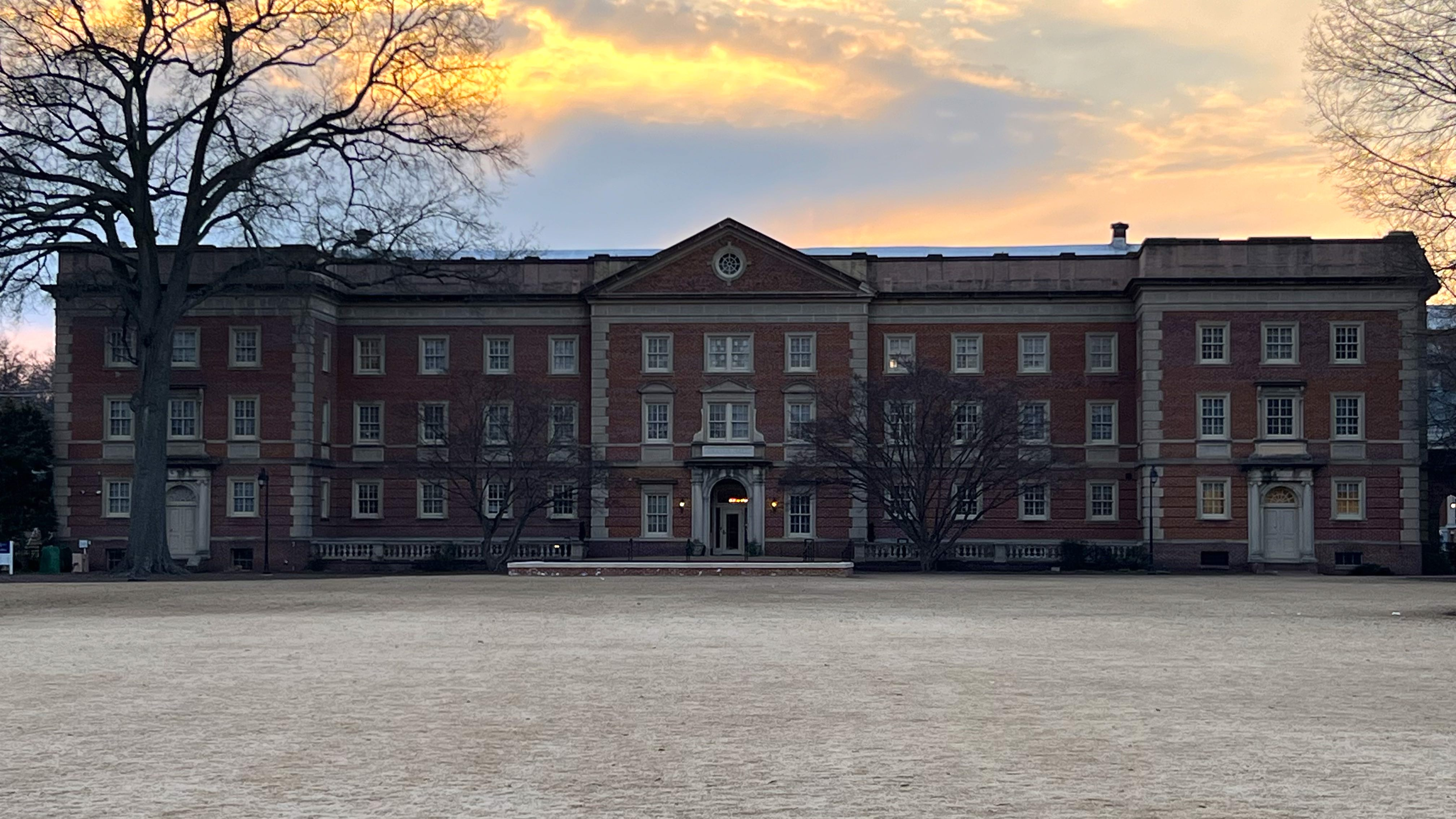
Graves Hall, of the former Baptist Theological Seminary.

Baptist Theological Seminary at Richmond (BTSR) was a free-standing seminary in Richmond, Virginia. It was founded in March 1989 by Virginia Baptists related to the Southern Baptist Alliance (now the Alliance of Baptists) and Baptist General Association of Virginia. In the late 1980s, as the situation began to change in Southern Baptist Convention during the conservative resurgence/fundamentalist takeover, others in the region joined them in seeing the need for alternative options for theological education among Baptists. BTSR was also affiliated with the Cooperative Baptist Fellowship. Accredited by the Association of Theological Schools in the United States and Canada, BTSR offered degrees including the Master of Divinity (M.Div.), Master of Theological Studies (MTS), and Doctor of Ministry (D.Min.).

On November 13, 2018, the BTSR Trustees announced that the school would close, effective June 30, 2019. The trustees cited financial pressure as the reason for the closure, and said that the school would work with students to transfer their credits to other seminaries.
