= Eddie Williams (American football) =

American football player (born 1987)

No. 40, 43, 44
- Positions: Fullback, running back

Personal information
- Born: August 22, 1987 (age 39); San Mateo, California, U.S.
- Listed height: 6 ft 2 in (1.88 m)
- Listed weight: 249 lb (113 kg)

Career information
- High school: Aragon (San Mateo)
- College: Idaho
- NFL draft: 2009: 7th round, 221st overall pick

Career history
- Washington Redskins (2009); Chicago Bears (2010−2011)*; Cleveland Browns (2011)*; Seattle Seahawks (2011); Cleveland Browns (2011−2013)
- * Offseason or practice squad member only

Career NFL statistics
- Rushing attempts: 2
- Rushing yards: 2
- Receptions: 1
- Receiving yards: 17
- Stats at Pro Football Reference

Eddie James Williams (born August 22, 1987) is an American former professional football player who was a fullback in the National Football League (NFL). He played college football for the Idaho Vandals, and was selected by the Washington Redskins in the seventh round of the 2009 NFL draft. He was also a member of the Chicago Bears, Cleveland Browns, and Seattle Seahawks.

== College career ==
Williams was a first-team All-WAC selection in 2008, and a SI.com honorable mention All-American. Williams is Idaho's 1-A all-time tight ends single-season receptions leader with 54. He also attended the NFL Scouting Combine in February 2009.

== Professional career ==
=== Washington Redskins ===
Williams was selected by the Washington Redskins in the seventh round of the 2009 NFL draft with the 221st overall pick. He was waived by the Redskins on September 5, 2009. He was then signed to the practice squad. Williams was activated to the Redskins' 53-man roster on November 2.

After the 2009 season, Williams was released by the team on March 4, 2010.

=== Chicago Bears ===
On March 10, 2010, Williams was signed by the Chicago Bears. He was waived on September 4, but signed to the Bears' practice squad the next day.

Williams was waived on September 2, 2011, before the start of the 2011 regular season.

=== Cleveland Browns (first stint) ===
Williams was signed to the practice squad of the Cleveland Browns on September 7, 2011.

=== Seattle Seahawks ===
Williams was signed off the Browns' practice squad by the Seattle Seahawks on September 13. He started six games.

=== Cleveland Browns (second stint) ===
Williams was re-signed to the Browns on November 8, 2011. He was promoted to the active roster on December 16 and started the remaining three games of the 2011 season. He primarily saw the field as a fullback, but also contributed as an h-back and on special teams.

On August 14, 2012, Williams was waived-injured by the team. After not being claimed off waivers following back surgery, he was put on the team's injured reserve list. He saw action in 2013, playing in fifteen of the Browns' sixteen games, starting six.

== Post-football career ==
Williams has been a motivational speaker for businesses and organizations.

=== Ministry ===
Following his NFL career, Williams served as lead pastor at the Bay City Church in San Francisco. The congregation sought to become a part of the Acts 29 Network, a church planting organization founded by Mark Driscoll. The church ceased operations in late 2020 amidst the COVID-19 pandemic.

Williams currently serves as lead pastor of Doxa Church, previously located in Bellevue, Washington at the former main campus of the Driscoll-led Mars Hill Church. Following the resignation of Driscoll and the dissolution of Mars Hill, the church changed its name and eventually moved to Redmond, Washington.

== Personal life ==
Williams grew up in the Bay Area and is married with four children.
