= The Rise and Fall of Mars Hill =

American Christian podcast

- Genre: Religion and spirituality podcast
- Language: American English

Cast and voices
- Hosted by: Mike Cosper

Production
- Length: 60 Minutes

Publication
- No. of episodes: 15
- Original release: June 21, 2021 – November 10, 2022
- Provider: Christianity Today

Related
- Related shows: Inside the Driscoll Cult
- Website: www.christianitytoday.com/ct/podcasts

The Rise and Fall of Mars Hill is a podcast that discusses the popularity, and later scandal associated with Mars Hill Church and Mark Driscoll. The show is hosted by Mike Cosper and produced by Christianity Today.

== Background ==
The podcast discusses Mark Driscoll's resignation from Mars Hill Church in Seattle. Mars Hill Church was founded in 1996 and later collapsed in 2014. Mars Hill Church had twelve thousand weekly attendance, roughly six thousand members, and twelve different locations. The first episode emphasizes that pastors like Driscoll have a lot of charisma and natural speaking ability, but they lack the character needed to properly use those abilities. The show focuses on the culture surrounding megachurches and evangelicalism. The show is produced by the evangelical magazine Christianity Today and it is hosted by a former pastor, Mike Cosper. The show discusses Mars Hill's emphasis on church growth. The show draws out the connections between Mars Hill Church and the Southern Baptist Convention.

The show discusses how the Acts 29 network was co-founded by Driscoll. The podcast focuses heavily on masculinity and opines that Driscoll's approach to motivating men is a form of toxic masculinity. The show discusses Driscoll's Calvinist approach to theology and his emphasis on the need for men to stand and fight against things like feminism, LGBTQ culture, Islam, and secularism. Driscoll is grouped with other celebrity pastors who have lost public support such as Ravi Zacharias and Bill Hybels.

== Format ==
The series has twelve episodes as well as several bonus episodes. In every episode, there is an interview with a guest from a variety of disciplines—historians, theologians, sociologists, and anthropologists—in order to better understand Mars Hill and Mark Driscoll. Episode 5 included an interview with Dr. Rose Madrid-Swetman. One of the bonus episodes is dedicated specifically to Joshua Harris. The show contains interviews with Yuval Levin, Roger Berkowitz from the Hannah Arendt Center for Politics and Humanities, and Russell Moore who previously served as the former president of the ERLC. There are also multiple interviews with a counselor named Aundi Kolber, Christian therapist Dan Allender, and pastor Timothy Keller. Several reviewers have noted that the podcast's title and journalistic style resemble the true crime genre.

== Reception ==
The podcast received four out of five mics from Podcast Magazine. Concerns have been raised by Brad Hambrick of the Center for Faith & Culture regarding whether a podcast like The Rise and Fall of Mars Hill Church is healthy or not. Trevin Wax of The Gospel Coalition, noted that "Christian podcasts in the journalism genre will stand in the shadow of this one, much like Serial changed the game for narrative podcasts nationwide" and the show's production quality has been noted by others.
