= Mark Driscoll =

American pastor and author (born 1970)

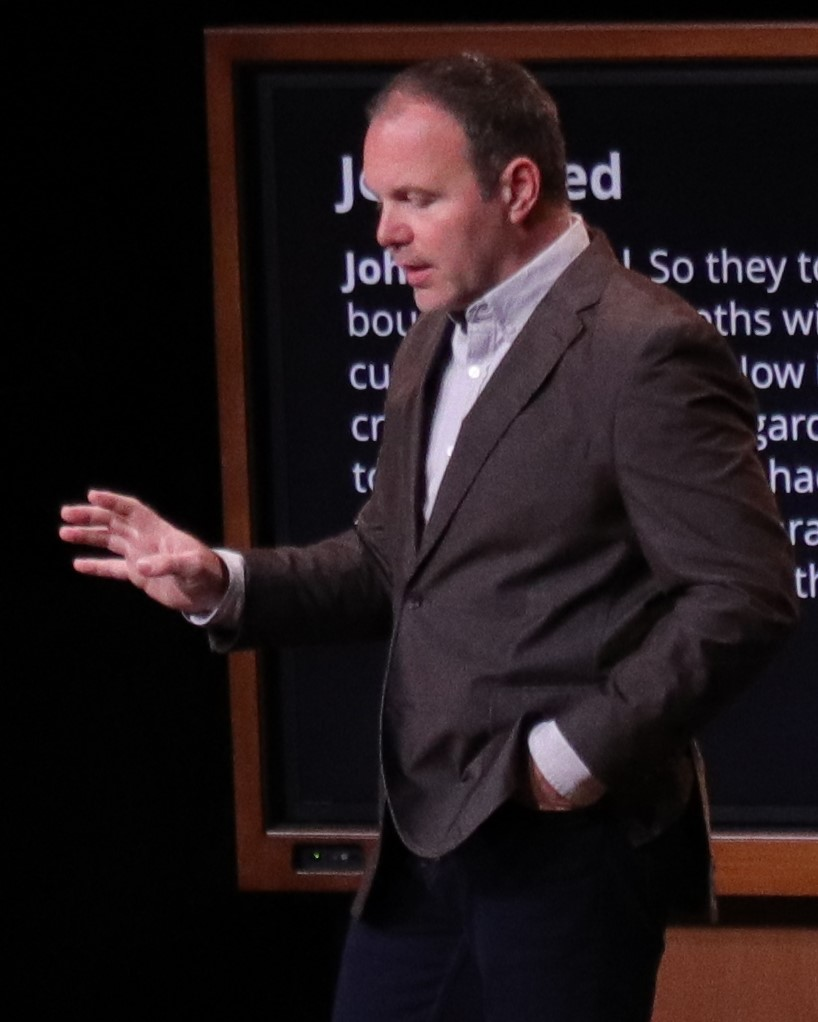
- Driscoll preaching at The Trinity Church
- Born: Mark A. Driscoll; October 11, 1970 (age 56); Grand Forks, North Dakota, US
- Education: Washington State University (BA); Western Seminary (MA)
- Occupations: Pastor; author
- Years active: 1990–present
- Spouse: Grace Driscoll (née Martin)

Ecclesiastical career
- Religion: Christianity (evangelical)
- Church: Mars Hill Church (1996–2014); The Trinity Church (since 2016)
- Website: www.realfaith.com

Mark A. Driscoll (born 1970) is an American evangelical pastor, author, and Bible teacher. He is the co-founder of RealFaith Ministries, a Christian media ministry established in 2016 that distributes Bible teaching, sermons, podcasts, and other religious resources through digital platforms. Driscoll co-founded RealFaith alongside his wife, Grace, and their daughter, Ashley. He is also the senior and founding pastor of Trinity Church in Scottsdale, Arizona, which was established in 2016.

In 1996, Driscoll co-founded Mars Hill Church in Seattle, Washington. By March 2014, Mars Hill Church had approximately 14,000 members across fifteen locations in five states. He also founded The Resurgence, a theological cooperative, and co-founded several other Christian organizations, including Acts 29 Network, Churches Helping Churches, and The Gospel Coalition. Driscoll has contributed to The Seattle Times, OnFaith, and Fox News and has authored numerous Christian books, including A Call to Resurgence.

Driscoll is known for his conservative evangelical theology and direct, often confrontational preaching style. His teachings on gender roles and leadership have attracted both support and criticism. During his tenure at Mars Hill Church, he also faced controversy over plagiarism and allegations concerning the church's leadership practices and organizational culture.

In 2014, Driscoll faced public criticism and formal complaints from Mars Hill staff members and congregants regarding his leadership and conduct. In August of that year, Acts 29 Network removed Mars Hill Church from its network and called for Driscoll's resignation. Driscoll resigned from Mars Hill on October 14, 2014. The church subsequently dissolved, with its campuses closing or becoming independent congregations. In 2021, Mark Driscoll was the subject of a popular podcast called The Rise and Fall of Mars Hill.

== Early life ==
Driscoll was born on October 11, 1970, in Grand Forks, North Dakota. He was "raised "Roman Catholic in a rough neighborhood on the outskirts of Seattle", in the Riverton Heights area of SeaTac, Washington. As Driscoll has written, it was "a very rough neighborhood", where, Driscoll had noted, serial killer Ted Bundy had picked up victims. He is the oldest of five children and the son of a union drywaller. He has described a difficult family history of abuse and crime, writing: "The men on my father's side include uneducated alcoholics, mental patients, and women beaters. ... One of the main reasons my parents moved from North Dakota to Seattle was to get away from some family members when I was a very young boy."

In high school, he met his future wife, Grace Martin. Martin is the daughter of evangelical pastor Gib Martin. In 1989, Driscoll graduated from Highline High School in Burien, Washington, where he served as student body president, captain of the baseball team, and editor of the school newspaper. He was named as the student "most likely to succeed" in his graduating class. At age 19, as a college freshman, Driscoll converted to evangelical Christianity. The same year, according to Driscoll, "God spoke to me ... He told me to marry Grace, preach the Bible, train men, and plant churches ... I began preparing to devote my life to obey [God's] call for me." He earned a Bachelor of Arts degree in communication from Washington State University with a minor in philosophy. Driscoll holds a Master of Arts degree in exegetical theology from Western Seminary.

== Career at Mars Hill Church ==
After graduation, Mark and Grace relocated to Seattle, where they attended Antioch Bible Church and worked with that church's college ministry as volunteers. Mark was hired as an intern a few months later. Through his internship, Mark met Mike Gunn, who worked for an Athletes in Action ministry at the University of Washington, and Lief Moi, a radio show host. The three men began to discuss planting an "urban, postmodern" church in Seattle. Greg Kappas, the pastor responsible for Antioch Bible Church's new church planting ministry, mentored the three and helped them develop their plans.

=== Founding Mars Hill Church ===
Driscoll, Lief Moi, and Mike Gunn founded Mars Hill Church in spring 1995 and officially launched it in fall 1996. The church first met in the Driscolls' home. By spring 1997, the church had relocated and expanded to two services. Driscoll later reflected that he was "not ready" when he planted Mars Hill at age 25.

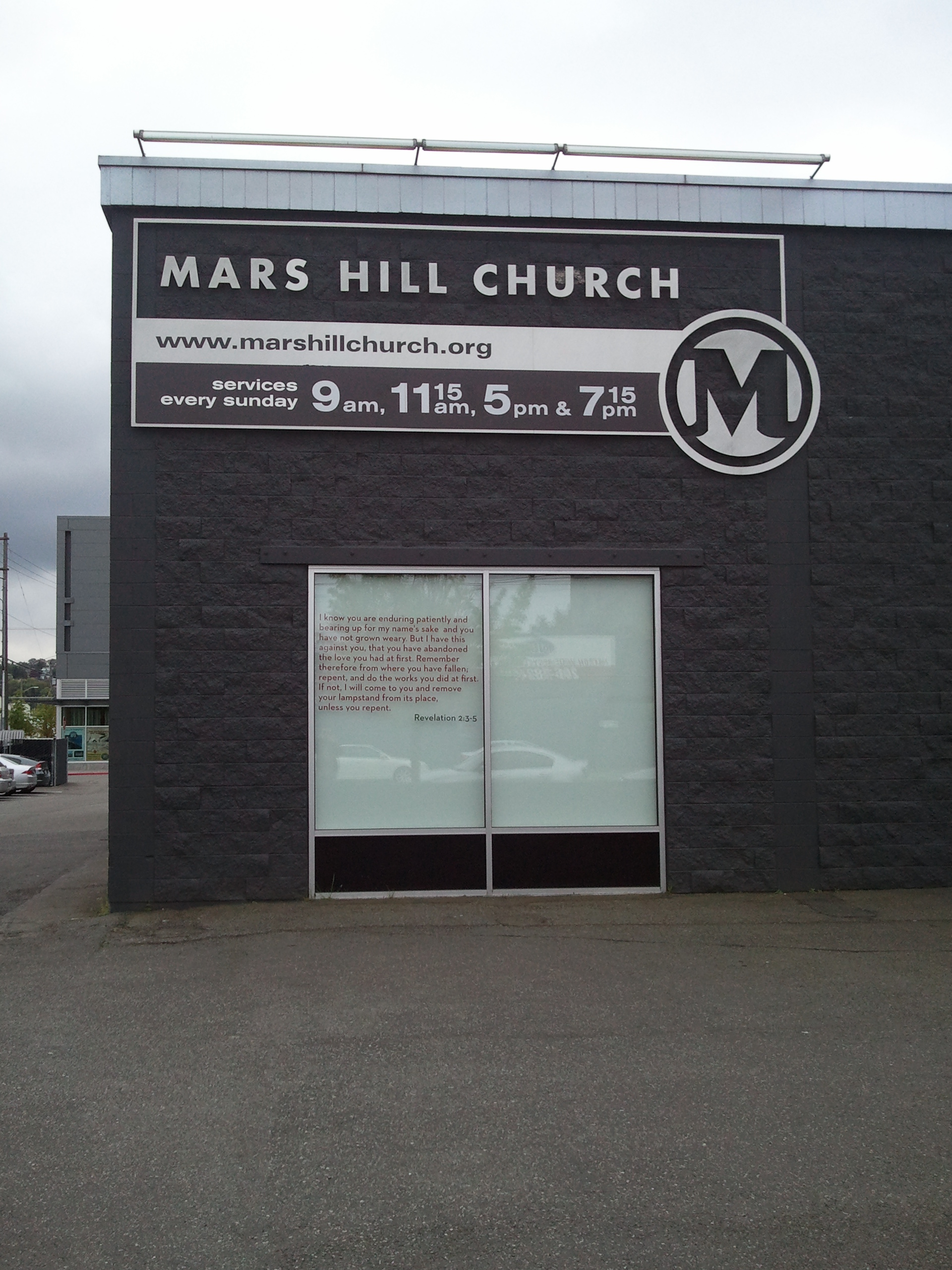
Mars Hill Church's main campus in Seattle's Ballard neighborhood

Later in 1997, he was invited to speak at a Leadership Network pastors' conference in California. The speech he made inspired many within the nascent emerging church movement and, according to Driscoll, shifted the movement's focus from reaching Generation X to reaching the postmodern world. As a result, Mars Hill Church and Driscoll were thrust into the national spotlight: he was interviewed on National Public Radio, and Mother Jones magazine published a feature on the church. Mars Hill Church grew from 160 members in 1996 to 350 in 1999.

=== Founding the Acts 29 Network ===
In 1998, Driscoll and David Nicholas founded the Acts 29 Network ("Acts 29"), a church planting network, in response to people approaching Driscoll for advice on planting churches. The goal of this parachurch organization was to plant 1000 new churches around the world "through recruiting, assessing, training, funding, and coaching." Acts 29 started slowly under Driscoll's tenure, with 11 churches at its inception and 17 by 2003. At that point, it began to grow rapidly, reaching 50 churches by 2006 and 410 churches by 2011. The majority are still located in the U.S., with 38 churches in 16 other countries.

According to Salon, Driscoll structured Acts 29 to match his own "strict orthodoxy and views" on theology and politics, while allowing latitude in cultural specifics.

=== Mars Hill Church reorganization (2006–2007) ===
==== Rationale ====
Driscoll, Mars Hill's first paid pastor, had been its main preaching pastor and public face since its inception. As the church grew, he began to train other elders and deacons, moving himself into a more executive role in setting vision and continuing to preach. By 2006, the church counted 4000–5000 weekly attendees at three campuses in the Seattle region. In that year, Driscoll claimed that he had reached a personal crisis due to his "overwhelming workload"—at this time he was the principal authority in Mars Hill, president of Acts 29, president of The Resurgence, an author, and an international traveler with speaking engagements. He was, by his own account, sleeping only two to three hours per night and began to fear that he would die early from a heart attack. Ultimately, in 2006–2007, he began to restructure the church and claimed he was going to divest power. Within Mars Hill, he publicly stated that he resigned as "legal president", president of the elder board, and chief of staff, while retaining his roles as public face and preaching pastor.

Prior to the reorganization, Mars Hill was governed by a full council of two dozen church elders (including Driscoll) who had equal voting authority and voted on major decisions, and a five-member council of "executive elders" (also including Driscoll) who handled daily operations but deferred to the full council for major decisions. According to then-Mars Hill pastor Paul Petry, in summer 2007, Driscoll "replaced the [executive council] with yes-men" and began to make major decisions—such as purchasing a $4 million new building—without consulting the full council.

==== Proposed bylaw changes ====
Driscoll proposed changes to the bylaws that would grant indefinite terms of office to the "executive elders". Driscoll and proponents of the changes argued that the church had outgrown its original governing structure, while opponents contended that the changes consolidated power with Driscoll and his trusted lieutenants. Paul Petry and another pastor, Bent Meyer, both dissented from the changes. In response, Driscoll fired both from their jobs. A Mars Hill forum posting reported—without naming the pastors—that one was fired for "displaying an unhealthy distrust in the senior leadership" and the other for "disregarding the accepted elder protocol for the bylaw deliberation period" and "verbally attacking the lead pastor [Driscoll]."

The morning after Petry and Meyer were fired, Driscoll said to his pastors and other church leaders at a conference: "Yesterday we fired two elders for the first time in the history of Mars Hill. ... They were off mission, so now they're unemployed. This will be the defining issue as to whether or not you succeed or fail. I've read enough of the New Testament to know that occasionally Paul puts somebody in the wood chipper."

In addition to the loss of their jobs, both were put on ecclesiastical trials to review their church membership. Petry was charged by Driscoll and the other elders with "lack of trust and respect for spiritual authority" and "improper use of confidential information", the latter charge because Petry had discussed the bylaw changes with church deacon Rob Smith, who was not part of the council of elders but had been asked to join. Petry was permitted to respond to the charges, but was not allowed to attend his full trial. The elders came to a unanimous conclusion that Petry was no longer qualified to be a church elder. Driscoll urged his congregation to shun Petry's family.

Meyer was given a "gentler" ecclesiastical trial but chose to resign. Rob Smith had written an email to the elders calling for a fair trial for Petry and Meyer; Smith said that in response, Driscoll told his congregants to stop giving to Agathos, an independent economic development charity that Smith also ran, causing donations to drop by 80 percent.

==== Repercussions ====
In 2014, Petry, Smith, and Moi all joined—and, in some cases, organized—online protests against Driscoll. Commentators linked the summer 2014 "unrest" at Mars Hill to the structural changes of 2007, along with other developments in Driscoll's career.

=== ABC Nightline special (2009) ===
In March 2009, Driscoll was involved in an ABC Nightline debate entitled, "Does Satan Exist?" Driscoll and Annie Lobert, founder of the Hookers for Jesus Christian ministry, argued for the existence of the devil against the author Deepak Chopra and Carlton Pearson, a former fundamentalist minister and author of The Gospel of Inclusion. A commentator described the debate as "contentious", with all participants taking "uncompromising" positions. Driscoll argued that a belief in both Satan and God was an essential tenet of Christianity. Driscoll has also been featured on the program discussing other topics including the Ten Commandments and sex.

=== Haiti relief (2010) ===
After the 2010 Haiti earthquake, Driscoll and James MacDonald founded Churches Helping Churches to help churches rebuild after catastrophic natural disasters. They helped to rebuild dozens of churches in Haiti and Japan. Driscoll first flew to Haiti shortly after the earthquake, and set up a partnership between his church and Jean F. E. St. Cyr, a Haitian pastor. Mars Hill Church donated $1.7 million in medical supplies.

=== Resignation from Acts 29 and The Gospel Coalition (2012) ===
On March 29, 2012, Driscoll resigned as President of Acts 29 and from the Council of The Gospel Coalition, turning his responsibilities over to Matt Chandler. Commenting on the transition, Chandler said, "[the Acts 29 board was] running a network of 422 churches on six continents the same way when it was 80 to 100 churches on one continent." Chandler also planned to disentangle Acts 29 from Mars Hill Church; prior to Driscoll's departure, Acts 29 was primarily funded by Mars Hill. By mid-2014, Driscoll was no longer on the board of Acts 29.

Driscoll was a founding member of The Gospel Coalition, a fellowship of reformed evangelical churches. On his departure, he wrote he had no "relational conflict with anyone and no disagreement theologically"; rather, he explained that he was reorganizing his priorities and could not keep up with all of his commitments. Driscoll indicated that he intended to devote more of his efforts to Mars Hill Church, more time to his family, and less time to travel.

=== Formal charges filed by former elder Dave Kraft (2013) ===
Dave Kraft, a participant and elder at Mars Hill from 2005 to 2013, also served as Driscoll's personal "coach" during that time. In May 2013, Kraft filed formal charges (under Mars Hill Church bylaws) of "mistreatment" against Mark Driscoll and other leaders at Mars Hill. He specifically accused Driscoll of being "domineering, verbally violent, arrogant, and quick-tempered." Kraft further argued that this "established pattern of ... behavior" disqualified Driscoll from church leadership. (Note: Specifically, Kraft said that Driscoll's behavior violated three different Bible passages that give the qualifications for church elders; under Mars Hill bylaws, Driscoll was required to meet the biblical standards of a church elder. The passages are: 1 Timothy 3, Titus 1, and 1 Peter 5.) Mars Hill Church's Board of Advisors and Accountability responded, saying that they sent 100 letters to former elders and staff in an effort to substantiate Kraft's charges. They received 18 responses, which they reviewed, and determined them to be "non-disqualifying" with respect to Driscoll's leadership position. However, the board did initiate a "reconciliation process" to address "many offenses and hurts that are still unresolved."

=== Former leaders and members protest Driscoll (2014) ===
Michael Paulson, writing for The New York Times, wrote that while Driscoll has faced criticism from the American political left and liberal Christianity for many years, the years leading up to and including 2014 saw the rise of criticism from conservative Christians, including Driscoll's former "allies and supporters". According to The Seattle Times, accusations of plagiarism by talk radio host Janet Mefferd were a "crucial turning point" that drew outside interest into Mars Hill's internal affairs, and prompted inquiries from new critics about the church and how it handled its finances. After hearing of Mefferd's plagiarism accusations, evangelical Christian and Grove City College psychology professor Warren Throckmorton took interest and became a critic of Driscoll and Mars Hill, documenting other examples of perceived plagiarism, abuse reported by former Mars Hill members, and questionable uses of church finances.

==== "Repentant Pastors" ====
On March 29, 2014, four former Mars Hill elders (Kyle Firstenberg, Dave Kraft, Scott Mitchell, and co-founder Lief Moi) created a blog titled "Repentant Pastor" and posted online "confessions ... and apologies" related to their leadership roles in Mars Hill. In a joint statement, they wrote, "we recognize and confess that Mars Hill has hurt many people within the Mars Hill community, as well as those outside the community". Salon summarized the statements, writing that the former leaders emphasized their failures to "rein Driscoll in" and their complicity with Driscoll's "autocratic" management style. Firstenberg's concerns included that while the church appeared to flourish, employees lived in constant stress, and "success was to be attained regardless of human and moral cost." He was quoted as saying:

The reputation Driscoll got for being the cussing pastor simply because he used harsh language from the pulpit was nothing compared to the swearing and abusive language he used daily with staff. When people asked me how I liked working at Mars Hill, I would simply say, "It is a great church to attend, but I wouldn't recommend working here." It was well known with the staff that what was preached on Sunday was not lived out Monday morning with the staff.

==== Driscoll addresses former members' complaints ====
In a recorded message shown to church members on July 27, 2014, Driscoll discussed the various controversies of 2014. He said that he could "not address some members' discontent ... because the complaints were anonymous." According to Rob Smith, former program director at the church, the anonymity assertion "really touched a nerve" with former members. In response, dissenters organized a Facebook group called "Dear Pastor Mark & Mars Hill: We Are Not Anonymous".

==== Public demonstration at Mars Hill Church ====
The following Sunday, "dozens of demonstrators" organized and picketed the Mars Hill Church Bellevue campus (where Driscoll preached live), calling for Driscoll's resignation. Demonstrators carried placards reading "We Are Not Anonymous" and "Question Mark", and accused Driscoll of bullying, misogyny, inadequate transparency in church finances, and harsh discipline of members. Driscoll was away for his annual summer vacation. A church elder, Anthony Iannicielo, responded that the criticism of Driscoll and Mars Hill "goes with the territory" of running a large church with a long history. In a pre-recorded message, Driscoll said that he had been deliberately "rather silent" during the criticism, that he found it "a little overwhelming and a bit confusing", and indicated that he had no intention of resigning.

==== Removal from Acts 29 Network ====
On August 8, 2014, the board of Acts 29 removed both Driscoll and Mars Hill Church from membership. Chairman Matt Chandler wrote, "It is our conviction that the nature of the accusations against Mark, most of which have been confirmed by him, make it untenable and unhelpful to keep Mark [Driscoll] and Mars Hill [Church] in our network." The board of directors of Acts 29 expressed gratitude for Driscoll's work with the Network as co-founder and former President, but declared his recent actions "ungodly and disqualifying behavior". To Driscoll, they wrote, "our board and network have been the recipients of ... dozens of fires directly linked to you ... we are naturally associated with you and feel that this association discredits the network and is a major distraction." They further advised him to "step down from ministry for an extended time and seek help."

Acts 29 had attempted to "lean on" the Mars Hill's Board of Advisors and Accountability (BOAA) to discipline Driscoll, but lost confidence in the board. The BOAA had been set up by Driscoll as his accountability board, rather than the elders of the church. (Members of the BOAA were for the most part professional clergy and businessmen who were not members of the church and hand picked by Driscoll.) The previous month, evangelical leaders and Acts 29 associates Paul Tripp and James MacDonald resigned from the BOAA. Religion correspondent Sarah Pulliam Bailey described Acts 29's decision as "unusual" since "ministries usually leave matters of church discipline up to local churches."

BOAA Chairman Michael Van Skaik responded, "Men, I told the lead pastors ... that we are making real progress in addressing the serious reconciliation and unhealthy culture issues that have been part of Mars Hill Church for way too long. And we are." He further added that Acts 29 leaders did not contact Mars Hill before acting, and that Driscoll had "changed his ways", and described Acts 29's actions as "divisive". Van Skaik also addressed the formal charges brought against Driscoll under the Mars Hill bylaws, writing "the formal charges that were filed were serious, were taken seriously, and were not dismissed by the board lightly."

==== Hiatus from ministry ====
On August 24, 2014, Driscoll announced he would take a six-week "extended focus break" from his pastorship while charges against him were investigated. Later that week, a letter signed by nine current Mars Hill pastors which severely criticized Driscoll was leaked to the public. The letter, written days before Driscoll stepped down, urged him to step down from all aspects of ministry. It included a quote from "internationally recognized" author, pastor and former BOAA member Paul Tripp saying, "This is without a doubt, the most abusive, coercive ministry culture I've ever been involved with." One of the pastors who signed the letter was fired five days later for "rebellion against the church". By September 9, eight of the nine pastors who signed the letter had resigned or been terminated, including worship director Dustin Kensrue. The last of the nine pastors was demoted from pastor to lay elder.

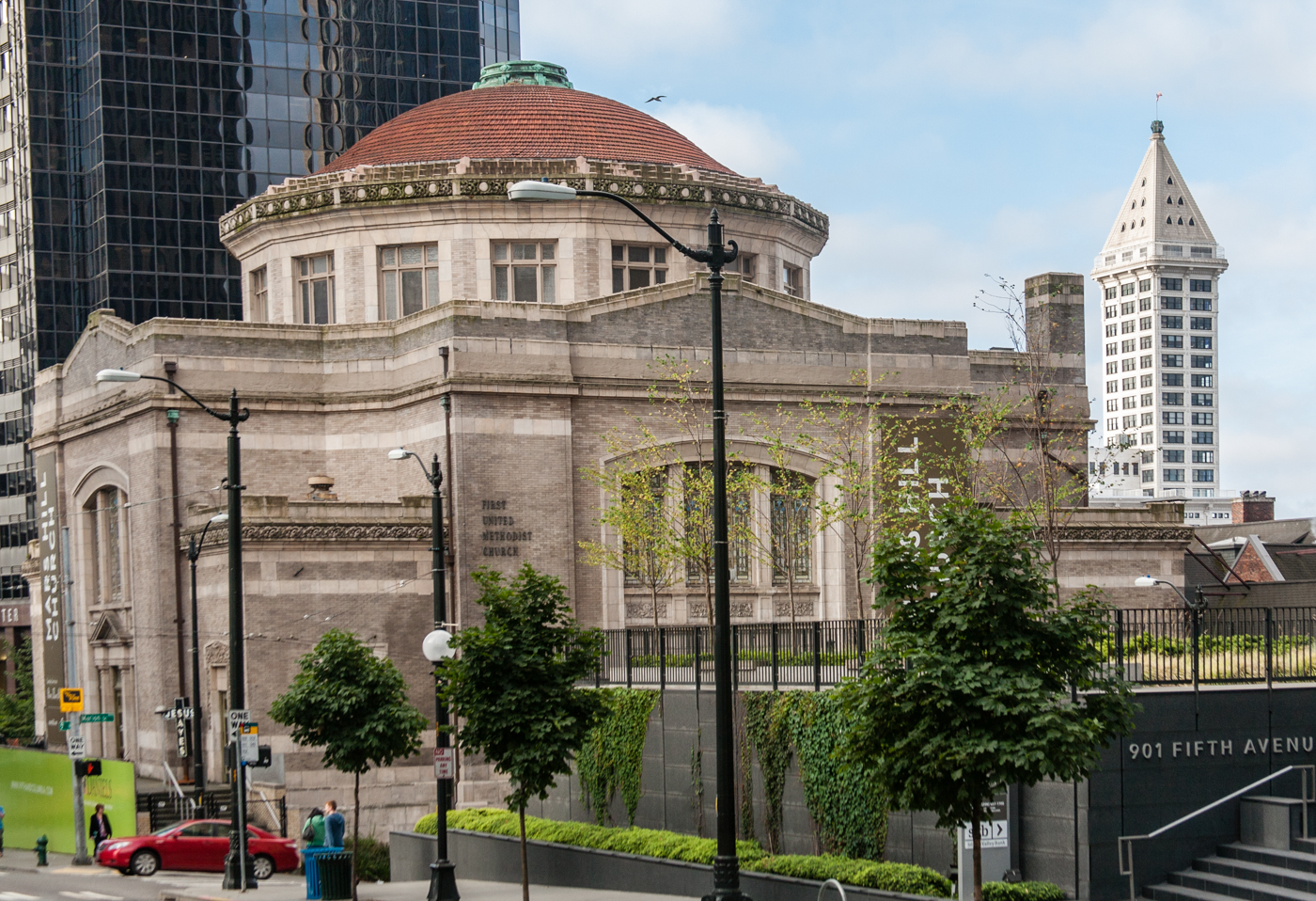
Mars Hill Church's downtown Seattle campus, one of the first locations to close prior to Driscoll's resignation. The building is the historic Daniels Recital Hall, a former Methodist Episcopal church.

==== Other repercussions ====
LifeWay Christian Resources, a Christian bookseller and publishing arm of the Southern Baptist Convention, announced on August 10, 2014, that they suspended sales of Driscoll's books. Marty King, communications director for LifeWay, said, "[we] are not selling Mark Driscoll's books while we assess the situation regarding his ministry." King identified Acts 29's call for Driscoll to step down as "certainly a part" of their decision, along with the "cumulative effect" of other allegations against Driscoll.

Driscoll was removed from the speaker roster of several planned Act Like Men conferences, which includes other Acts 29 speakers and past Driscoll associates, including James MacDonald and Matt Chandler. He was also removed as closing speaker at the Gateway Church Conference, an annual gathering of thousands of evangelical pastors. Mars Hill Church also cancelled their own Resurgence 2014 conference, planned for October 2014, since several planned speakers had cut ties with Driscoll.

=== Resignation from Mars Hill ===
In the fall of 2014, a group of elders released a report on an investigation into accusations of bullying and intimidating behavior by Driscoll made by 21 former church elders. The investigation involved "some 1,000 hours of research, interviewing more than 50 people and preparing 200 pages of information." The report concluded that Driscoll had never been charged with "immorality, illegality or heresy", and considered "some of the accusations against Pastor Mark to be altogether unfair or untrue." Additionally, the report found that many of the "other charges had previously been addressed by Pastor Mark, privately and publicly. Indeed, he had publicly confessed and apologized for a number of the charges against him, some of which occurred as long as 14 years ago." However, elders did find "bullying" and "patterns of persistent sinful behavior" by Driscoll. The board also concluded that Driscoll had "been guilty of arrogance, responding to conflict with a quick temper and harsh speech, and leading the staff and elders in a domineering manner", but was not charged with anything immoral or illegal. Driscoll maintained that he had not disqualified himself from ministry.

Church leadership crafted a "restoration" plan to help Driscoll and save the church. Instead, Driscoll declined the restoration plan and resigned on October 14, 2014, citing concerns for his health and safety. On October 20, 2014, Driscoll publicly stated that prior to his resignation, he and his family were harassed and he had received death threats. His resignation came as a "surprise" to the church's Board of Overseers, who said in a statement that they had not asked Driscoll for his resignation.

The journalist Ruth Graham wrote that "there was no single disgrace or crime that brought Driscoll down. Instead, it was a series of accusations: of plagiarism, crudeness, a bullying management style, unseemly consolidation of power, and squishy book-promotion ethics, to name a few." Theology professor Anthony Bradley remarked that while denominational churches have continuity after the departure of prominent leaders, Mars Hill Church was nondenominational and largely built on Driscoll's personal charisma.

== The Trinity Church in Scottsdale, Arizona ==
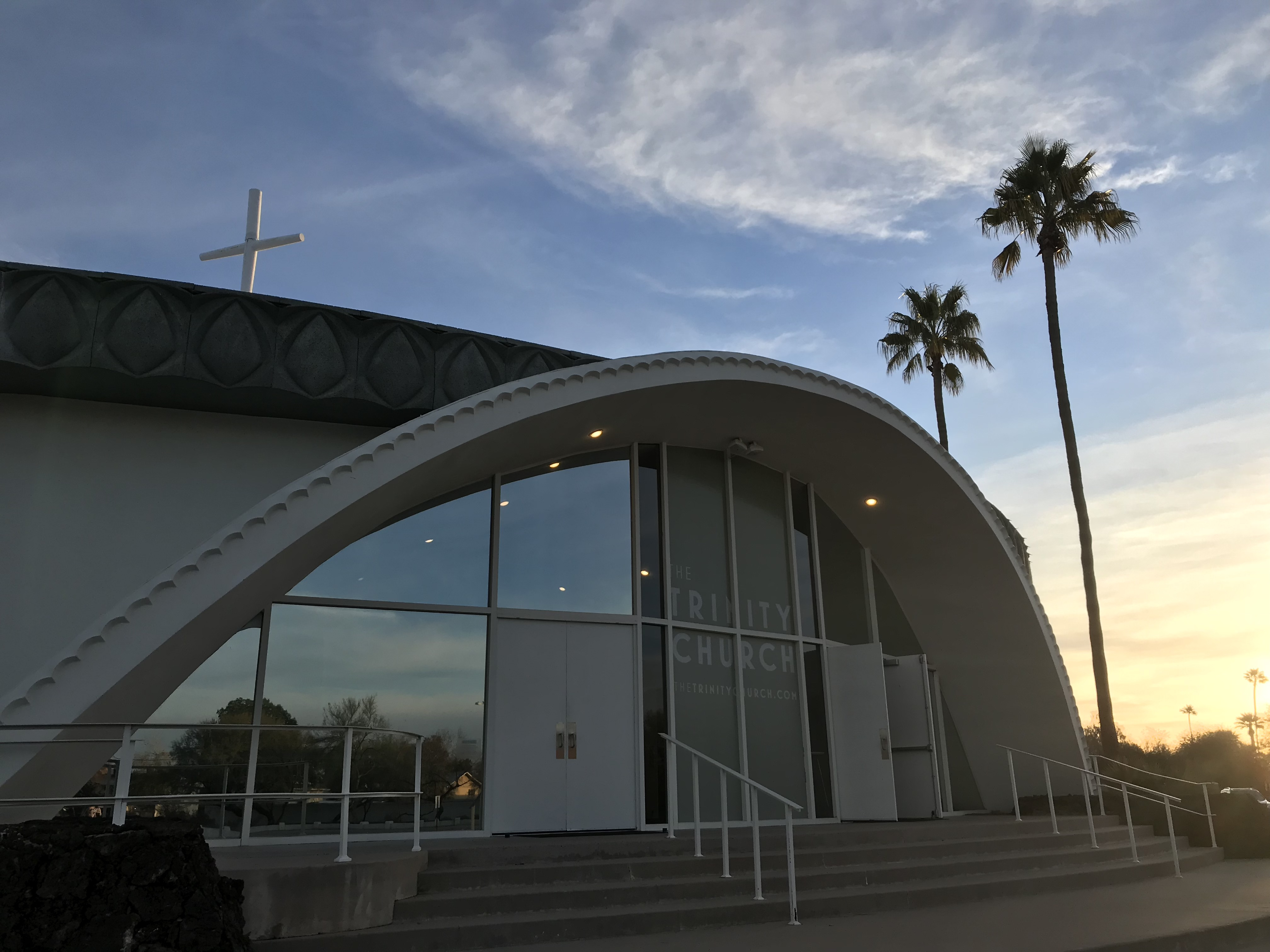

On July 27, 2015, Driscoll announced that his new ministry had purchased the mailing list and assets of The Resurgence from Mars Hill Church and that he and his family had moved to the Phoenix area. On February 1, 2016, Driscoll announced the opening of his new church: The Trinity Church in Scottsdale, Arizona. As of February 2016, the staff roster included two former Mars Hill employees. Texas megachurch pastors Robert Morris and Jimmy Evans were on the church's board.

In July 2021, a letter surfaced from 41 elders who served alongside Mark in the Mars Hill years, calling for him to resign from the Trinity Church and step away from ministry completely. In the letter, they detailed concerns that the abuse and behavioral concerns had continued at the Trinity Church, and that Mark had proven himself unfit to lead in a ministry setting.

== Public image ==
According to The Seattle Times, "preaching and communicating lies at the heart of Driscoll's draw." In another Seattle Times article, Driscoll is described as a "hipster preacher" who used "charisma and combativeness".

Driscoll has been described as a "gifted orator" and "charismatic leader". People call him a very compelling speaker, "gifted" and "dynamic and funny, with a potent mix of reverence for Jesus and irreverence for everything else." His public speaking style, he says, is influenced by stand-up comedians like Chris Rock. Crosscut.com described his presentation style as follows:

Pacing the stage at the main Ballard campus, he delivered a sermon on marriage roles as he saw them set forth in the Song of Solomon. He told stories from his own marriage, offered statistics, and dropped jokes without their feeling forced. Every few minutes he would sniff in a thoughtful, practiced sort of way. This untucked, down-to-earth demeanor was the opposite of a huckster televangelist, but polished in its own way. It makes the guy easy to listen to.

Rob Wall, a professor at Seattle Pacific University, links the success of Mars Hill Church to Mark Driscoll's direct answers to complicated spiritual questions: "His style of public rhetoric is very authoritative. Whether it's about the Bible, or about culture, he is very clear and definitive."

In 2009, The New York Times Magazine called Driscoll "one of the most admired—and reviled—figures among evangelicals nationwide." In 2011, Preaching magazine named him one of the 25 most influential [English-speaking] pastors of the past 25 years.

Driscoll is described in a 2014 profile by Salon as being the center of a cult of personality, and of using controversy to increase his visibility. Salon has also described "[sex] talk fused with God talk, or titillation more broadly, [as] a key component of the Driscoll brand", adding: "Driscoll's stage persona at times has included tight jeans and an extra button open on the shirt. He once greeted a crowd at the University of Washington by reporting that he had gotten his genitals caught in his zipper before the show and that he would be stopping on time because his wife was at home waiting for him with a cream pie."

== Controversies ==
=== Comments on sexuality and gender ===
When the evangelical pastor Ted Haggard resigned from church leadership in 2006, after a sex scandal involving a male escort, Driscoll provoked an uproar by posting the following comment on his blog: "A wife who lets herself go and is not sexually available to her husband in the ways that the Song of Songs is so frank about is not responsible for her husband's sin, but she may not be helping him either." Driscoll later apologized for his statement, stating that he did not intend for his comment to reflect on Haggard's wife personally. After the incident, the Seattle Times discontinued Driscoll as one of its religion columnists.

On July 30, 2014, dissenters released a "controversial, vulgar" rant Driscoll had written under the pseudonym "William Wallace II" in 2000, dubbed the "Pussified Nation" rant. The rant contained "blunt and emotional comments critical of feminism, homosexual behavior, and 'sensitive emasculated' men", and called for "real men" to rise up in the spirit of Scottish warrior William Wallace as depicted in the film Braveheart. Mars Hill Church had long since deleted their unmoderated "Midrash" discussion board where the forum postings occurred. Driscoll referenced the incident in his 2006 book Confessions of a Reformission Rev; in that book, he stated that he believed his intentions were good, but regretted having written the rant. He wrote in 2006, "I had a good mission, but some of my tactics were born out of anger and burnout, and I did a lot of harm and damage while attracting a lot of attention." Driscoll responded to the release of the rant in a letter to his congregation, writing that "the content of my postings to that discussion board does not reflect how I feel or how I would conduct myself today." On September 8, 2014, blogger Libby Anne republished other examples of material written by "William Wallace II" in 2001, and remarked she had "rarely seen an evangelical man assert male superiority and prominence this directly."

=== Accusations of plagiarism in A Call to Resurgence (2013) ===
On November 21, 2013, radio host Janet Mefferd accused Driscoll of plagiarism. Mefferd claimed that 14 pages of Driscoll's book A Call to Resurgence quoted "extensively and without citation" from Peter Jones's 1999 book, Gospel Truth/Pagan Lies: Can You Tell the Difference? and Jones's 2010 book One or Two: Seeing a World of Difference. Driscoll's publisher Tyndale House stated that they performed a "thorough in-house review" and disagreed that this was a case of plagiarism. Neil Holdway, a plagiarism expert with the American Copy Editors Society, concluded that "Driscoll had not adequately indicated the extent to which he had borrowed Jones's work."

More allegations of plagiarism in other Driscoll works soon surfaced, including passages from a sermon series companion text, Trial: 8 Witnesses From 1&2 Peter, which were copied verbatim from passages written by David Wheaton in the New Bible Commentary. InterVarsity Press, publisher of the New Bible Commentary, stated that Driscoll failed to properly provide quotation or attribution for the material. The relevant passages were posted online. The allegations soon expanded to include claims that Driscoll used ghostwriters and researchers without giving them proper attribution. As of December 2013, neither Peter Jones, D.A. Carson, nor Janet Mefferd had made any further statements pertaining to the case.

Syndicator Salem Radio subsequently removed both the broadcast interview with Driscoll and associated materials from Mefferd's program website and apologized for raising the matter in a broadcast interview. This attempt to shut down the story provoked the resignation of Mefferd's producer, Ingrid Schlueter. In explaining her resignation, Schlueter wrote the following regarding herself and Mefferd:

I was a part-time, topic producer for Janet Mefferd until [December 3, 2013] when I resigned over this situation. All I can share is that there is an evangelical celebrity machine that is more powerful than anyone realizes. You may not go up against the machine. That is all. Mark Driscoll clearly plagiarized and those who could have underscored the seriousness of it and demanded accountability did not. That is the reality of the evangelical industrial complex.

Schlueter, who worked with family-owned VCY America until 2011, and was a freelance producer for Mefferd, previously charged Driscoll for his use of vulgarity in church.

At a time when American young people are hit in the face with graphic sexuality in every facet of our culture, the church should be a safe haven where the sacredness and privacy of the act of marriage is respected by pastors. Those with sexual issues need to receive private counseling — not sex seminars in a church auditorium.

For generations, Christian pastors have managed to convey the Scripture’s teachings on fornication, adultery and the beauty of sexuality within marriage without sullying and cheapening it. Mark Driscoll is a sad product of our times. While waving his orthodox doctrinal credentials, he has simultaneously embraced the spirit of the age when it comes to his treatment of sex. In the process, he is pornifying the church and only adding to the moral squalor of our culture.

Driscoll apologized for "mistakes" related to the allegations in a statement released to The Christian Post on December 18, 2013.

=== New York Times Bestseller List and Driscoll's Real Marriage (2014) ===
On March 5, 2014, evangelical magazine World published an article claiming that Mars Hill Church paid a $25,000 fee to marketing firm ResultSource, to manipulate sales numbers of Mark Driscoll's book Real Marriage and thereby attain a place on the New York Times bestseller list. ResultSource accomplished this objective—the book briefly reached #1 in the "Advice How-to" category—by buying 11,000 copies of the book, using $210,000 of Mars Hill Church's money, from a variety of online sources and payment methods.

The Evangelical Council for Financial Accountability stated that buying a place on bestseller lists violates its ethical standards, but that, because this happened before Mars Hill Church joined, they were unable to take action. Christianity Today described the arrangement as "ethically questionable", and Carl Trueman of religion journal First Things decried the revelation, writing, "the overall picture is one of disaster" and "[it] has raised questions not simply about personal integrity but also the very culture of American Evangelicalism."

Driscoll had used the apparent success of Real Marriage to negotiate a multi-book deal with Christian publisher Tyndale House. The first book under Driscoll's "Resurgence" imprint was A Call to Resurgence, with plans to publish five to seven books per year. Tyndale House defended Driscoll's alleged plagiarism in A Call to Resurgence, and affirmed their continuing relationship with Driscoll.

Mars Hill Church responded with a statement, writing, "while not uncommon or illegal, this unwise strategy [of buying one's own books to drive up book sales figures] is not one we had used before or since, and not one we will use again." Mars Hill also claimed that the "true cost" of the effort was less than "what has been reported".

On March 17, 2014, Driscoll posted an open letter of apology in response to this controversy and others, writing that he will no longer claim to be a New York Times bestselling author, and that he now sees the ResultSource marketing campaign as "manipulating a book sales reporting system, which is wrong." He wrote that he was giving up his status as a "celebrity pastor", that he considered his "angry young prophet" days to be over, and that he was reducing his public presence in speaking engagements and on social media.

=== Planned appearance at Hillsong Conference 2015 ===
Driscoll was scheduled to appear at Hillsong Church's 2015 Australian and UK conferences. A petition against Driscoll's appearance at the conference collected 3000 signatures, prompting Hillsong Church Senior Pastor Brian Houston to cancel Driscoll's planned speaking event. Instead, the Hillsong conference presented a 30-minute taped interview of Mark and Grace Driscoll interviewed by Houston at the conference.

== Beliefs ==
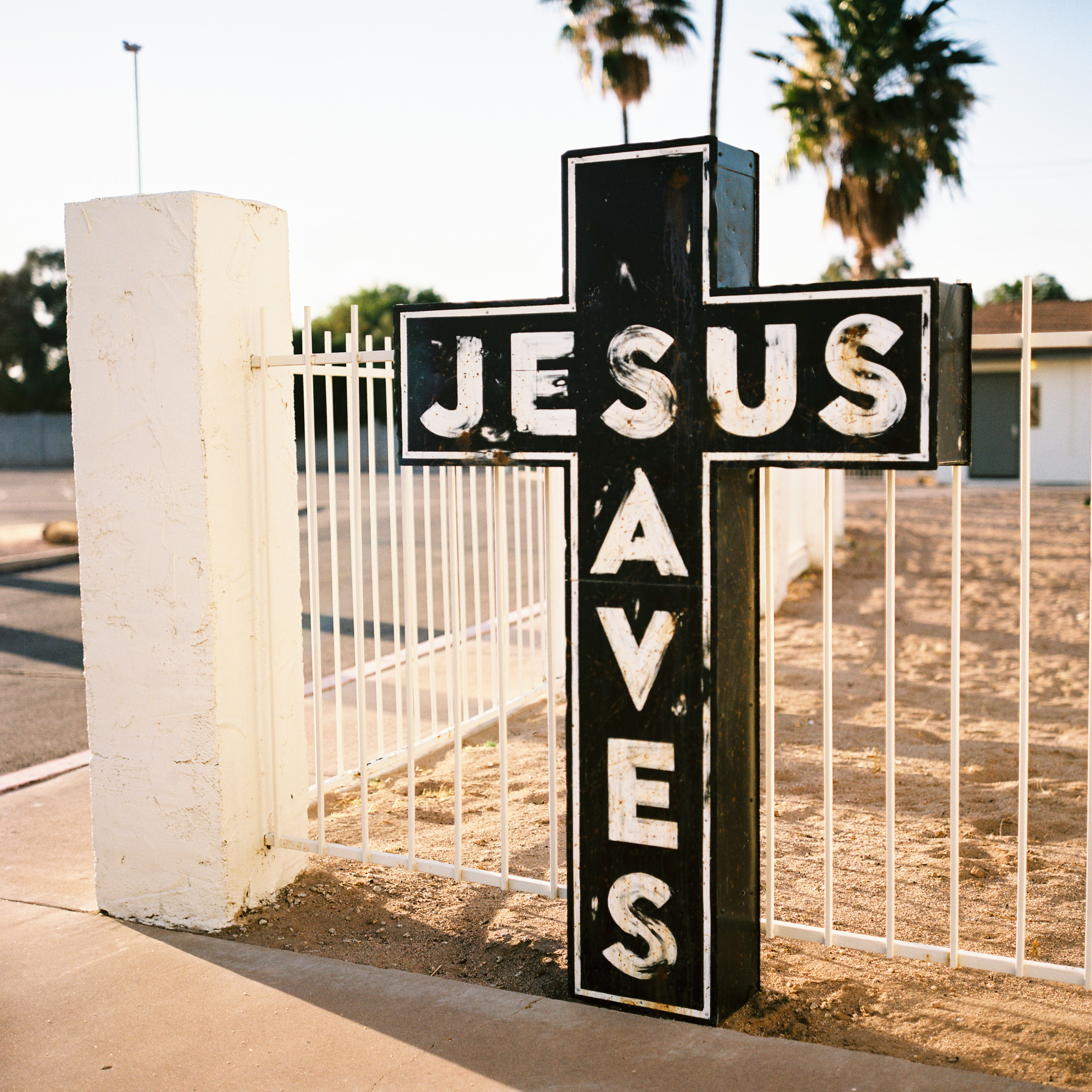
Jesus Saves cross outside The Trinity Church

Driscoll is an evangelical Christian. Within that broad movement, he is theologically and socially conservative. On the Bible, he is a literalist and inerrantist. Driscoll's theology draws inspiration from historical theologians, including Augustine of Hippo, John Calvin, and Martin Luther, along with the Puritans, Jonathan Edwards, and Charles Spurgeon. He also respects evangelical leaders such as Billy Graham, J. I. Packer, Francis Schaeffer, and John Stott. His contemporary influences include Lesslie Newbigin and the group he terms the "Missional Reformed Evangelicals": Don Carson and John Piper for theology, and Tim Keller and Ed Stetzer for missiology. Driscoll's combination of theological conservatism and his "missional" embrace of contemporary culture contribute to controversies. In his younger years, Molly Worthen wrote: "Conservatives call Driscoll 'the cussing pastor' and wish that he'd trade in his fashionably distressed jeans and taste for indie rock for a suit and tie and placid choral arrangements. Liberals wince at his hellfire theology and insistence that women submit to their husbands."

Regarding spiritual gifts, Driscoll is a continuationist. Regarding creation, he is a "Historic Creationist". In his book Doctrine: What Christians Should Believe, Driscoll expressed his respect for John Sailhamer's book Genesis Unbound; Driscoll is skeptical of evolution as a part of creationism. Driscoll believes that homosexual behavior is sinful and that marriage is between one man and one woman. Regarding ecclesiastical polity, Driscoll favors an elder-led approach.

=== Calvinism ===
Driscoll formerly adhered to four point Calvinist theology called Amyraldism, although he characterized his position specifically as new Calvinism to differentiate himself from the more cessationist and non-missional aspects associated historically with Calvinism.

Driscoll denies the orthodox Calvinist view of limited atonement and believes instead that Jesus died for all people in some sense, and for some people (the elect) in another sense. He thinks this position was what John Calvin believed, saying in a humorous tone: "Calvinism came after Calvin ... I will argue that the Calvinists are not very Calvin. I will argue against Calvinism with Calvin ... What kind of Calvinist are you? I'm a Calvin, not a Calvinist, that came later". Driscoll also believes that this position (or slight variations thereof) was held by men like Charles Spurgeon, John Bunyan, Martin Luther, and Richard Baxter.

Driscoll distinguished between double and single predestination, and said that unlike John Calvin, he believes only in single predestination.

Driscoll has since labelled the "five points" of Calvinism as "garbage".

=== Christian nationalism ===
Driscoll has expressed support for Christian nationalism, going as far as saying "Jesus is a Christian nationalist" and that critiques of the movement are rooted in Satan "because unified unbelievers are stronger and more powerful than divided believers."

=== Emerging church ===
Driscoll was associated with the emerging church movement. He described the movement as follows:

The emerging church is a growing, loosely connected movement of primarily young pastors who are glad to see the end of modernity and are seeking to function as missionaries who bring the gospel of Jesus Christ to emerging and postmodern cultures. The emerging church welcomes the tension of holding in one closed hand the unchanging truth of evangelical Christian theology (Jude 3) and holding in one open hand the many cultural ways of showing and speaking Christian truth as a missionary to America (1 Cor 9:19–23). Since the movement, if it can be called that, is young and is still defining its theological center, I do not want to portray the movement as ideologically unified because I myself swim in the theologically conservative stream of the emerging church.

Driscoll later distanced himself from the movement:

In the mid-1990s I was part of what is now known as the emerging church and spent some time traveling the country to speak on the emerging church in the emerging culture on a team put together by Leadership Network called the Young Leader Network. But, I eventually had to distance myself from the emergent stream of the network because friends like Brian McLaren and Doug Pagitt began pushing a theological agenda that greatly troubled me. Examples include referring to God as a chick, questioning God's sovereignty over and knowledge of the future, denial of the substitutionary atonement at the cross, a low view of Scripture, and denial of hell which is one hell of a mistake.

=== Masculinity and gender roles ===
Driscoll's detractors associate him with the concept of hypermasculinity. Driscoll believes that Christianity has been "feminized". In a 2006 interview with Desiring God, he said, "The problem with the church today, it's just a bunch of nice, soft, tender, 'chickified' [sic] church boys. Sixty percent of Christians are chicks, and the forty percent that are dudes are still sort of chicks. ... The whole architecture and the whole aesthetic [of church buildings and services] is really feminine." He believes that in order to be innovative, the church needs to get entrepreneurial young men involved, who will "make the culture of the future."

On gender roles, Driscoll is a complementarian, believing that men and women have equal worth, but have different roles within the family and the church. He endorses male headship of the home and church. According to a Mother Jones profile on Driscoll in 1998, he may have held egalitarian views at one time. He offered church courses in "evangelical feminism" and is quoted as saying "the Bible is clear that men and women are both created by God in His image and likeness and totally equal in every way." In 2003, Driscoll said that he wished he could change the parts of the Bible that he believes restrict women from being pastors.

Driscoll interprets the Apostle Paul as writing that women are encouraged to be an active part of life and ministry in the church, but that only men can teach other men or become "elder-pastors" (the terms being synonymous). Since Paul's prohibition of female elder-pastors appeals to the Genesis creation story (1 Timothy 2:14) for its rationale, Driscoll argues that the restriction is permanent and cannot be adjusted for changing culture.

When the Episcopal Church elected Katharine Jefferts Schori as its first female Presiding Bishop, Driscoll wrote on his blog that "if Christian males do not man up soon, the Episcopalians may vote a fluffy baby bunny rabbit as their next bishop to lead God's men."

=== Sexuality ===
According to Salon.com, "Driscoll has been a key advocate for candid conversations about sexuality among conservative Christians".

In Christians Might Be Crazy, Driscoll defends marriage as being between a man and a woman saying "It is clear that Jesus saw the male-female marriage bond of Genesis 1-2 as the prototype for human sexual relationships. Anything outside those boundaries was off limits. Despite this strong evidence, supporters of homosexuality nevertheless often appeal to Jesus, claiming that 'Jesus never condemned homosexuality' or even 'He never mentioned homosexuality'. [...] Jesus was no coward when it came to speaking up in order to rattle conventional thinking and effect change. If He was silent, it was because He saw no need to challenge the position His listeners already held."

Mark and Grace Driscoll published their first book together, entitled Real Marriage: The Truth About Sex, Friendship, and Life Together, in January 2012. It includes a chapter entitled "Can We ___?", discussing a biblical rationale for specific sexual acts that evangelical pastors are considered reluctant to discuss. Driscoll said that the book was written because "only two [Christian] books go into depth on sexuality ... a lot of Christian teaching about sex is answering questions of a previous generation." The Driscolls and Mars Hill Church heavily promoted the book, taking interviews with The View, Fox & Friends, and Piers Morgan Tonight.

The Daily Beast described the book as controversial, writing that "evangelicals of all stripes [were] outraged ... from conservatives shocked by the graphic sex descriptions to liberals who hate its degrading of women." Christian author and blogger Rachel Held Evans wrote, "Grace [Driscoll] is often cast as the damaged and sinful wife who withholds sex from her deserving husband, Mark the hero who is justified in leaving his wife but instead comes along to rescue her." Driscoll responded to criticism in a post to CNN's Belief Blog, writing: "You try to write a book on marriage and sex with your wife and next thing you know there are a lot of ants crashing your picnic." He wrote that he and Grace anticipated criticism "from all sides" but felt it would be worthwhile anyway, because "we want to help marriages and single people aspiring to marry. ..."

In a 2007 sermon he preached in Edinburgh, Scotland, Driscoll asserted that Song of Solomon 2:3 in which the female narrator says "his fruit is sweet to my taste" refers to oral sex, adding "'Men, I am glad to report to you that oral sex is biblical. ... The wife performing oral sex on the husband is biblical ... Ladies, your husbands appreciate oral sex. They do. So, serve them, love them well'". During the same sermon, Driscoll stated that he had once advised a woman that she ought to perform oral sex upon her husband, and to apologize for her past unwillingness to do so; Driscoll added that later, the woman's husband was influenced to become a Christian because she had followed this advice.

== Works ==
=== Books ===
- Driscoll, Mark; Ashley, Jennifer; Bickle, Michael 'Mike'; Howerton, Michael 'Mike' (2004). The Relevant Church: A New Vision For Communities of Faith. Relevant Books. ISBN 0-9746942-4-X.
- ——— (2004). The Radical Reformission. Zondervan. ISBN 0-310-25659-3.
- ——— (2006). Confessions of a Reformission Rev. Zondervan. ISBN 0-310-27016-2.
- ———; et al. (2007). Piper, John (ed.). The Supremacy of Christ in a Postmodern World. Crossway Books. ISBN 978-1-58134-922-1.
- ———; et al. (2007). Webber, Robert E (ed.). Listening to the Beliefs of Emerging Churches. Zondervan. ISBN 978-0-310-27135-2.
- ———; Breshears, Gerry (2008). Death by Love: Letters from the Cross. Crossway Books. ISBN 978-1-4335-0129-6.
- ——— (2008). On the New Testament (Book You'll Actually Read). Crossway Books. ISBN 978-1-4335-0134-0.
- ——— (2008). On the Old Testament (Book You'll Actually Read). Crossway Books. ISBN 978-1-4335-0135-7.
- ——— (2008). On Church Leadership (Book You'll Actually Read). Crossway Books. ISBN 978-1-4335-0137-1.
- ——— (2008). On Who Is God? (Book You'll Actually Read). Crossway Books. ISBN 978-1-4335-0136-4.
- ———; Breshears, Gerry (2008). Vintage Jesus: Timeless Answers to Timely Questions. Crossway Books. ISBN 978-1-58134-975-7.
- ———; Breshears, Gerry (2009). Vintage Church: Timeless Truths and Timely Methods. Crossway Books. ISBN 978-1-4335-0130-2.
- ——— (2009). Religion Saves: And Nine Other Misconceptions. Crossway Books. ISBN 978-1-4335-0616-1.
- ———; Breshears, Gerry (2010). Doctrine: What Christians Should Believe. Crossway Books. ISBN 978-1-4335-0625-3.
- ———; Driscoll, Grace (2012). Real Marriage: The Truth About Sex, Friendship, and Life Together. Thomas Nelson. ISBN 978-1-4002-0383-3.
- ——— (2013a). Who Do You Think You Are?: Finding Your True Identity in Christ. Thomas Nelson. ISBN 978-1-4002-0385-7.
- ——— (2013b). A Call To Resurgence: Will Christianity Have a Funeral or a Future?. Tyndale House. ISBN 978-1-41438362-0.
- ——— (2018). Spirit-Filled Jesus: Live by His Power. Charisma House. ISBN 978-1-62999522-9.
- ——— (2018). Christians Might Be Crazy: Answering the Top 7 Objections to Christianity. Charisma House. ISBN 978-1-94246466-2.
- ——— (2019). Win Your War. Charisma House. ISBN 978-1-62999625-7.

=== eBooks ===
- ——— (2009b). Pastor Dad: Scriptural Insights on Fatherhood. Re:Lit. ISBN 978-1-25713438-0.
- ——— (2008). Porn-Again Christian: A Frank Discussion on Pornography & Masturbation. Re:Lit.

=== Documentaries ===
- Hellbound? (2012), appears as self

== See also ==
- Cafe church
- The Rise and Fall of Mars Hill
- Thaddeus Matthews (another "cussing pastor")
