= Real Marriage =

2012 book by Mark and Grace Driscoll

Real Marriage: The Truth About Sex, Friendship, and Life Together
- First edition hardcover
- Author: Mark Driscoll, Grace Driscoll
- Language: English
- Genre: Christian Life
- Publisher: Thomas Nelson
- Publication date: January 3, 2012
- Publication place: United States
- Media type: Print (Hardback & e-book)
- Pages: 272 pp (first edition, hardback)
- ISBN: 140020383X (first edition, hardback)

Real Marriage: The Truth About Sex, Friendship, and Life Together is a 2012 marriage book written by Christian author Mark Driscoll and his wife, Grace, and published by Thomas Nelson. The book spent one week on the New York Times Best Seller list for advice books, however, controversy arose when it was later reported that a former pastor of Mars Hill Church had contracted with the marketing firm Result Source to affect metrics on the best-seller list shortly before resigning. The church also created a Real Marriage sermon series based on the book.

== Content ==
In the preface, Mark and Grace Driscoll state that they developed the book after they had counseled many couples—many of them facing challenges on how to apply the Bible to their marriage. According to the authors, many of the couples they counseled were afraid of asking questions, and the book sought to address those questions. The book holds to the complementarian view of marriage between one man and one woman. The book is divided into three parts: Marriage, Sex, and The Last Day. In part one, the Driscolls share their personal stories, including their individual upbringings, their years as a dating couple, and conflict in their marriage. In part two, the authors deal with three different views of sex—sex as god, sex as gross, and sex as gift. In part three, the authors lay out how to "reverse engineer" one's marriage, by examining how to "finish well" on its last day.

== Real Marriage Series ==
The book was later turned into a sermon series, featuring Mark Driscoll and his wife Grace, with question and answers at the end of each sermon. Paralleling the book's content, the series is divided into:

- "New Marriage Same Spouse"
- "Friend with Benefits" Driscoll cites the story of Martin Luther and Katharina von Bora to discuss friendship in the context of marriage.
- "Men and Marriage" Driscoll cites the book of Genesis, stating that when Eve sinned, God called on Adam, not Eve. Driscoll states that men are responsible for their wife and family.
- "The Respectful Wife" Driscoll states that this chapter was written by his wife Grace, and that he is "just delivering the mail." Driscoll refers to the book of Ephesians stating that a "respectful wife" consists of praying for her husband, "respecting him thereby making him respectable," but not enabling him with silent compliance.
- "Taking Out the Trash"
- "Sex: God, Gross, or Gift?"
- "Disgrace and Grace"
- "The Porn Path" Mark and Grace Driscoll invite a former employee of the porn industry to discuss her life and experience from that line of work.
- "Selfish Lovers and Servant Lovers"
- "Can We________"
- "Reverse-Engineering Your Life and Marriage"

== Reception ==
Critical reception for the book has been mixed, with Publishers Weekly praising the book's "boldly refreshing approach". Relevant wrote that "Though it's certainly not all bad, the helpful and the harmful in Real Marriage are too thoroughly intertwined to be helpful."

=== Criticism ===
The book has faced criticism due to the Driscolls' detailed and frank discussion of sex in Real Marriage. The Driscolls have stated that they did not write the book for people looking to read the book for "voyeuristic" intents, but because they viewed sex as an important part of marriage and that the majority of marriage help books were written for people who had not "experienced sexual assault or been abused or exposed to pornography or sexual sins". The book has also been criticized for content such as chapters entitled "The Respectful Wife", with critics stating that the book was "an astoundingly unbelievable work of disrespect for women" and that "the book focuses so much on sex that it can create the impression that it's the most important element of marriage".

Mark Driscoll has replied to these criticisms, stating that he was aware that the book's content would "catch flak" and that "accommodating everyone would be impossible".

== New York Times Bestseller controversy ==
In March 2014, The Los Angeles Times reported that Mars Hill Church contracted with Result Source "to conduct a bestseller campaign for your book, 'Real Marriage' on the week of January 2, 2012. The bestseller campaign is intended to place 'Real Marriage' on the New York Times bestseller list for the Advice How-to list." To achieve this, the contract stated that "RSI will be purchasing at least 11,000 total orders in one-week." This took place and as a result, the book was successfully ranked #1 on the hardcover advice bestseller list on January 22, 2012.

On March 28, 2015, a former elder of the church revealed that Mark Driscoll had not been involved in initiating nor signing the contract with the marketing firm Result Source. The elder stated that the business relationship with Result Source was initiated by a pastor who resigned shortly thereafter, and remaining church leaders disagreed over the completion of the contract stating that it would reflect badly on the church and Mark Driscoll.

== See also ==
- Mars Hill Church
- Acts 29 Network
