= Handbook for Mortals =

2017 novel by Lani Sarem

- First edition book cover
- Author: Lani Sarem
- Language: English
- Genre: Young adult Romantic fantasy
- Published: August 15, 2017
- Publisher: Geeknation Press
- Publication place: United States
- ISBN: 978-1-5456-1145-6

Handbook for Mortals is a 2017 young adult fantasy romance novel by Lani Sarem, first published by Geeknation Press in 2017 and subsequently mass-printed as a hardcover book.

The title received media attention for its placement on The New York Times Best Seller list in 2017, despite the book being relatively unknown to most readers, not readily available in brick-and-mortar stores, and its author having never published any other works before. An investigation into the novel by author Phil Stamper showed evidence that the book's placement was achieved through manipulation, such as unusual bulk ordering sales. The New York Times subsequently removed the book from its rankings.

== Plot summary ==
The novel follows the adventures of Scheherazade "Zade" Esther Holder, a twenty-five-year-old woman who comes from a family of folk magic practitioners in a small Tennessee town. She decides to leave home in the hopes of discovering her identity and breaking away from an overprotective mother, in the process joining a Las Vegas troupe of eccentric stage magicians and performers. She forges romantic connections with several men, both her fellow troupe members and other men such as Carrot Top, relishing having several men "constantly fawning over" her. The one exception is Zeb, a magician with whom she is constantly at odds. While alluring to men, Zade questions the prospects of a "mixed" relationship with a mortal man, and fails to get along with Sophia, one of the female performers, whom she calls ugly and treats with disdain.

During a magic show, Zade performs a stunning illusion but then falls into a coma after exerting herself without her "anchor" and lover, Mac, a fellow performer, who suspected that Zade was having an illicit affair with the elderly head stage magician, Charles Spellman. This is proven to be false, particularly as Zade discovers that Charles is actually her long-lost father.

== Development ==
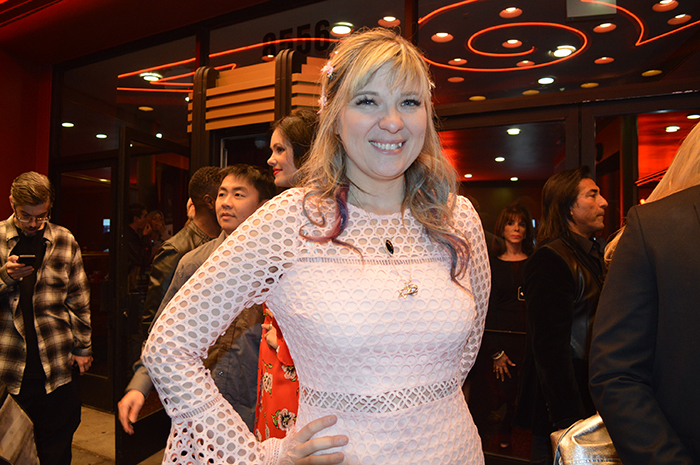
Lani Sarem, the book's author

Lani Sarem initially wrote Handbook for Mortals as a screenplay for a film proposal. She eventually re-wrote it as a novel, while also still intending for it to have a film adaptation.

== Publication ==
The Knife Thrower III by Gill Del Mace, the original work that was allegedly plagiarized for the cover art of Handbook for Mortals

Handbook for Mortals was first published in ebook and hardback formats through Geeknation Press on August 16, 2017. The cover featured artwork that critics claimed was plagiarized from Australian artist Gill Del Mace's The Knife Thrower III, as the artwork appeared to have been traced over and recoloured.

== New York Times Bestseller List placement ==
On August 27, 2017, Handbook for Mortals appeared on The New York Times Bestseller list, in the number one ranking. The book displaced Angie Thomas's The Hate U Give, which had previously held that rank for several months. Such placement received scrutiny from readers and media outlets, as no one had previously heard of the book and that it had released the week prior. Of the copies reported sold, The Guardian noted that "Industry monitor Nielsen BookScan recorded 18,597 sales of Handbook for Mortals in one weekend". Young adult fiction writer Phil Stamper, who was skeptical of the book's placement, noted that it was a rarity for most books to sell more than 5,000 copies in their first week of publication, and that Handbook for Mortals was not stocked by any major book retailer. Stamper would later post screenshots on Twitter of a conversation he had with a bookstore employee who reported receiving bulk orders for the novel; others would go on to post similar conversations they had with bookstore employees, all of whom worked in locations that reported their sales to The New York Times.

Sarem stated that she had pre-sold approximately 5,000 copies of the novel through her website and 13,000 through appearances at Wizard World and comic-con conventions alongside her collaborator, actor Thomas Ian Nicholas, for an average of about 2,100 per appearance. This was also met with skepticism, as publisher Spike Trotman and bookstore owner Maryelizabeth Yturralde noted that sales of this magnitude at conventions would be unusual and would draw attention, citing that authors Neil Gaiman and George R. R. Martin would typically only sell hundreds of copies of their novels on their best days.

The New York Times investigated the sales for Handbook for Mortals and subsequently removed the title altogether from the rankings, reporting that "After investigating the inconsistencies in the most recent reporting cycle, we decided that the sales for 'Handbook for Mortals' did not meet our criteria for inclusion". Blues Traveler band member John Popper commented on the media coverage and Sarem's prior employment with the band, stating that he found it in keeping with his experiences with her and that these experiences had led to her being fired. Sarem's response to her book's removal from its bestseller ranking was that "there has been no official explanation to what happened other than The New York Times reported inconsistencies. Nobody talked to us." She denied claims that she had gamed the system or knew of anyone doing it on her behalf. Sarem also criticized the book industry, stating that the criticism and skepticism towards her was a result of her not following "the normal YA rules" and "do[ing] it the way that they think it's supposed to be done". In an interview published on Vulture.com, Sarem later admitted that she and Nicholas had hired a company, likely ResultSource, to bulk buy copies of her book but that her sales via her website and conventions were legitimate.

A year after media outlets reported on Handbook for Mortals' appearance and removal from the bestseller list, BookRiot's Priya Sridhar reported that Sarem had never apologized and was still trying to adapt her novel into a film. Sridhar criticized Sarem for not realizing "the racist implications of what it means to knock down Angie Thomas to Number 2 and Nicola Yoon completely off the New York Times bestseller list. In addition, she doesn't realize that Young Adult readers are smart, and can tell when a story doesn't work." In 2019, writer Michael Seidlinger referenced the novel in relation to a similar situation with Oobah Butler's How to Bulls*t Your Way to #1: An Unorthodox Guide to 21st-Century Success, noting that Sarem was not the first author to try rank manipulation, citing Donald Trump purchasing bulk copies of his book The Art of the Deal to get it onto bestseller book lists when it was first published as an example. That same year, Laura Miller also mentioned Sarem and the novel in a retrospective of YA literature throughout the 2010s in an article for Slate, citing the investigation into the bestseller list controversy as an example of the "sophisticated networking of YA's adult fans".

== Reception ==
Jennifer Armintrout obtained a 2011 copy of the screenplay of Handbook for Mortals and reviewed it on her website in 2018, criticizing its characters and plotting, elements she said were also issues with the novel. She also wrote a chapter-by-chapter review.

== See also ==
- Small press publishing
