= Doug Pagitt =

American pastor & author (born 1966)

Doug Pagitt (born July 5, 1966) is a progressive evangelical pastor and author associated with the emerging church movement.

== Ministry ==
Pagitt is the founding pastor of Solomon's Porch in South Minneapolis and the executive director of Vote Common Good.

During weekly "gatherings" of Solomon's Porch, instead of giving traditional sermons, Pagitt facilitates dialogical talks, encouraging questions and participation from the congregation.

Pagitt founded Emergent Village in 1999, a generative friendship of missional church leaders around the world and is a leading architect of the emergent church discussion. He sees the emergent movement not as one organization but as an "incubation center" that has influenced hundreds of organizations by inspiring new ways of thinking of the Christian faith. In recent years, he has come to advocate for a what is termed a "Generous Christianity" through his involvement with Cana Initiative/Convergence.

In 2010, Pagitt launched the Doug Pagitt Radio Program on AM950 to discuss theology and culture.

Pagitt's recent endeavor, Greater Things, encompasses his unwavering passion to share the good news of a more just, generous and inclusive Christianity among those seeking to follow God in the way of Jesus.

In 2018, Pagitt founded Vote Common Good, a nonprofit political organization working with progressive, religiously-motivated voters. He currently serves as the group's Executive Director.

== Bibliography ==
- Reimagining Spiritual Formation: A Week in the Life of an Experimental Church (Zondervan, 2003) ISBN 9780310256878
- Preaching Re-Imagined: The Role of the Sermon in Communities of Faith (Zondervan, 2005) ISBN 0-310-26363-8.
- Church Re-Imagined: The Spiritual Formation of People in Communities of Faith (Zondervan, 2005) ISBN 0-310-26975-X.
- Listening to the Beliefs of Emerging Churches: Five Perspectives by Webber, Robert E. (General Editor) and John Burke, Dan Kimball, Doug Pagitt, Mark Driscoll, Karen M. Ward (Zondervan, 2007) ISBN 978-0-310-27135-2
- A Christianity Worth Believing: Hope-filled, Open-armed, Alive-and-well Faith for the Left Out, Left Behind, and Let Down in us All, (Jossey-Bass, 2008) ISBN 0-7879-9812-5
- BodyPrayer: The Posture of Intimacy with God with Kathryn Prill and Colleen Shealer Olson (Crown Publishing, 2013) ISBN 1-4000-7148-8
- Evangelism in the Inventive Age (Abingdon Press, 2014) ISBN 9781630880828
- Community in the Inventive Age (Abingdon Press, 2014) ISBN 9781630880842
- Church in the Inventive Age (Abingdon Press, 2014) ISBN 9781630880781
- Preaching in the Inventive Age (Abingdon Press, 2014) ISBN 9781630880804
- Flipped: The Provocative Truth That Changes Everything We Know About God (Convergent Books, 2015) ISBN 9781601426383 ISBN 9781601426376
- Outdoing Jesus: Seven Ways to Live Out the Promise of "Greater Than" (Eerdmans, 2019) ISBN 978-0802874405 ISBN 9781467456975
