= Vote Common Good =

American political advocacy organization

Vote Common Good is an American 501(c)(4) non-profit organization aimed at influencing religiously motivated voters. The group was founded by its executive director, Doug Pagitt.

During a national bus tour leading up to the 2018 midterm elections, the group held rallies with progressive candidates. In 2019 and 2020, the group was focused on encouraging religious voters to oppose the Trump administration through coordination with groups such as The Lincoln Project.

According to the group's website, they host events in-person, as well as online podcasts and video programs to influence voters. The group also conducts training events for candidates and claims to work with a number of prominent American religious leaders including Brian McLaren, Nadia Bolz-Weber, Shane Claiborne, John Pavlovitz and Diana Butler Bass.
