= Sexual identity therapy =

Psychotherapeutic framework

Sexual Identity Therapy (SIT) is a framework to "aid mental health practitioners in helping people arrive at a healthy and personally acceptable resolution of sexual identity and value conflicts." It was invented by Warren Throckmorton and Mark Yarhouse, professors at small conservative evangelical colleges. It has been endorsed by former American Psychological Association president Nick Cummings, psychiatrist Robert Spitzer, and the provost of Wheaton College, Stanton Jones. Sexual identity therapy puts the emphasis on how the client wants to live, identifies the core beliefs and helps the client live according to those beliefs. The creators state that their recommendations "are not sexual reorientation therapy protocols in disguise," but that they "help clients pursue lives they value." They say clients "have high levels of satisfaction with this approach". It is presented as an alternative to both sexual orientation change efforts and gay affirmative psychotherapy.

Work for developing the framework began with the establishment of the Institute for the Study of Sexual Identity in 2004. The announcement of the framework for Sexual Identity Therapy were first released on April 16, 2007. In June 2007, the guidelines were presented at the American Psychological Association convention in San Francisco. In 2008 the authors announced they were going to review the framework because of "continual changes that are occurring in the area of therapy for individuals experiencing same-sex attractions." In 2009, the APA released a report stating that such an approach is ethical and may be beneficial for some clients.

== Endorsements ==
Gay psychologist Lee Beckstead spoke about his "middle-ground" approach to working with those in conflict with their sexual orientation and religion. He spoke about his approach along with others who spoke about Sexual Identity Therapy at an APA conference. Robert L. Spitzer, who was instrumental in removing homosexuality from the DSM in 1973, endorsed the project, saying it was "a work that transcends polarized debates about whether gays can change their sexual orientation." Michael Bussee, an outspoken critic of the ex-gay movement endorsed the project. It has also been endorsed by several other professionals, including keynote speaker at the controversial organization National Association for Research & Therapy of Homosexuality (NARTH).

== Steps ==
Its purpose is to help clients align their sexual identity with their beliefs and values, which in some cases means celibacy, if chosen by the client. At any point during the therapy, a previous step may be revisited for further investigation or to explore a new direction in the therapy.

=== Assessment ===
The first step is to discover the reasoning of a client requesting therapy. Clinicians should determine whether the motivation is internal or external, followed by an open dialogue about motivations while respecting the client's world view. They should assist the client to clarify their values in order to determine their preferred course of action. This must be individualized.

=== Advanced informed consent ===
Clinicians should stay up to date on literature concerning the causes of homosexuality, but if the client asks about it, they should see how that would affect their course of action.

=== Psychotherapy ===
Sexual Identity Therapy gives a framework for existing techniques rather than a specific method of psychotherapy. If a therapist's value position is in conflict with the client's preferred direction, a referral to a more suitable mental health professional may be indicated. The goal of therapy is to help the person explore and eventually live more comfortably within a sexual identity that is consistent with personal values and beliefs. This may not be quick or complete, and the client should feel free to pursue other directions.

=== Sexual identity synthesis ===
As clients synthesize a new identity, the therapist should make them aware of the consequences. Therapeutic interventions can be employed to assist clients pursue valued behavior while avoiding unvalued behavior. While the decision is the clients, clients are advised against sexual behavior until they are comfortable with their new identity. Many clients find it helpful to attend support groups and avoid social situations that do not support the new identity.

== See also ==
- Conversion therapy
