= The Discipline of Market Leaders =

Non-fiction book about business

- Softcover edition
- Author: Michael Treacy; Fred Wiersema
- Language: English
- Subject: Business strategy
- Publisher: Addison-Wesley
- Publication date: 1995
- Publication place: United States
- Media type: Print
- Pages: 224 pp.
- ISBN: 978-0201407198

The Discipline of Market Leaders is a 1995 non-fiction book written by Michael Treacy and Fred Wiersema and published by Addison-Wesley. The book discusses competitive business strategies. It made The New York Times Best Seller list after the authors placed orders for thousands of copies of their own book.

== Content ==
The core of the book is based on five years of research by the authors into companies such as Wal-Mart, Dell, Southwest Airlines, Cott, Airborne Express, Atlantic Richfield, Home Depot, Intel, and Sony. It opens with several business questions, such as "Why is it that Casio can sell a calculator more cheaply than Kellogg's can sell a box of corn flakes? Does corn cost that much more than silicon?" The book raises questions about American business management and practices and then attempts to answer them. It also examines the financial benefits for companies that focus primarily on customer satisfaction rather than shareholder profits.

The book provides a business model based on three dimensions (called 'Value Disciplines"):

1. Customer intimacy
2. Product leadership
3. Operational excellence

and postulates that any successful business needs to maintain at least "acceptable" levels of performance in each of the three dimensions but would need to choose one of them to become a market leader in its field. The model suggests that if you truly want to excel in any of the three disciplines you will have to make sacrifices in the other two as these become mutually exclusive.

=== Customer intimacy ===
Treacy and Wiersema did not present a formal definition of customer intimacy, but used the term to refer to a business strategy that is focused on building deep customer relationships by understanding their specific needs and tailoring offerings to meet those needs exactly.

The first formal definition and empirical assessment of customer intimacy was done by Zhou and Brock in 2012, following the widespread adoption and use of the concept in industries worldwide such as IBM. According to them customer intimacy is a customer's perception of having a very close and valuable relationship with a supplier, characterized by high levels of mutual understanding. As such customer intimacy has three dimensions:

- mutual understanding, defined as: a customer's perception of comprehending each other – the seller’s and the buyer’s firm – on various attributes relevant to the business relationship.
- closeness, defined as: a customer's perception of the firm having extensive person-to-person contact with a supplier, at different functional levels, characterized by open personal and working relationships.
- value perception, defined as: a customer's perception of the firm deriving value from the relationship with the supplier, whereas value is understood as rational, economic, as well as, emotional, felt advantages arising out of the relationship.

Their subsequent empirical tests supported their definition and conceptualization of the customer intimacy construct in the Business-to-business context.

== Reception ==
The book debuted on The New York Times Best Seller Non-Fiction list on February 26, 1995, and remained on the list for 15 weeks, peaking at No. 4. The book also debuted at No. 1 on the Bloomberg Businessweek best-seller list on April 1. In 2012 it was reported to have sold over 250,000 copies.

Lois Weisberg stated the book "Provides great insight into the linkage of product value, operating excellence and customer focus," and Dale Dauten from the Chicago Sun-Times also spoke highly of it.

== Allegations ==
An August 1995 article in Bloomberg Businessweek by Will Stern first alleged the authors had manipulated sales of their book. Treacy and Addison-Wesley denied trying to manipulate sales, though Stern states according to his sources the campaign was orchestrated by Treacy and carried out with the help of Wiersema, Addison-Wesley and CSC Index, an international consulting firm Treacy regularly consulted for. It was revealed that the names of the bookstores that would be used to gauge book sales for The New York Times Best Seller list had become known, and that orders for the book had been placed at those stores. Stern states he interviewed dozens of book store owners, including one who took a suspicious order for 125 copies of the book shortly after it was published. After also interviewing over 100 book industry representatives, Stern concludes the authors spent over $250,000 buying over 10,000 copies of their own book. The authors admitted to buying "fewer than 10,000" copies of the book for clients and prospective clients. Stern also states CSC Index was used to covertly purchase an additional 30,000 to 40,000 copies. He traced many purchases of the book to CSC employees and affiliates. Most CSC affiliates refused to comment on the issue; however, the President of Paragon Co, a database marketing firm in Oxford, Ohio, confirmed that CSC had reimbursed him for over 10,000 copies of the book that he ordered for his firm, costing over $200,000. It was reportedly boasted around the office at Paragon Co that the company was involved in a scheme to make the book a best-seller, and so many copies of the book arrived at the firm they were stored in a tractor trailer. An independent book store in Manhattan sold 2,500 copies of the book to a consulting firm in Chicago.

The New York Times initially stated they were aware of the bulk book sales, and that they were confident the bulk sales had not increased the books position on the best-seller list. After reviewing the article in Bloomberg Businessweek, however, the editor of The New York Times book review section stated it was possible that the result had been manipulated, but that the process "would be so expensive that [they'd] have to have another reason for doing it beyond simply boosting book sales.

It is alleged the authors spent money on their own book in order to gain the benefits that are common from making The New York Times Best Seller list, such as speaking engagements and consulting opportunities, as well as further book sales, as chart success often begets more chart success. Treacy was said to be giving around 80 speeches a year, increasing his speaking fee from $25,000 to $30,000 after featuring on the best-seller list. While it is uncertain if the practice is illegal, the tactic has been described by publishers and booksellers as highly unethical. Following the incident The New York Times improved their methods for filtering bulk sales from affecting the list and made a better effort to hide the names of stores that were reporting for them.

== Impact ==
The success of the book — despite its controversies due to manipulated sales numbers — led to over 2,200 citations according to Google Scholar (July 16th, 2025), and various published academic investigations and applications of the concept in industry such as:

- Xavier, M.J. (2003), "Customer Insight and Intimacy in the Silent Commerce Era," IIMB Management Review, September.
- Akçura, M. Tolga and Kannan Srinivasan (2005), "Customer Intimacy and Cross-Selling Strategy," Management Science, 51 (6), 1007-1012.
- Yim, Chi Kin (Bennett), Tse, D.K., & Chan, K.W. (2008), "Strengthening Customer Loyalty Through Intimacy and Passion: Roles of Customer–Firm Affection and Customer–Staff Relationships in Services," Journal of Marketing Research, 45(6):741-756.
- Ponder, Nicole, Betsy Bugg Holloway, and John D Hansen (2016), “The Mediating Effects of Customers’ Intimacy Perceptions on the Trust-Commitment Relationship,” The Journal of services marketing 30, no. 1: 75–87.
- Liu, Qianhua, Ka-Ching Chan, and Ranga Chimhundu (2024), “From Customer Intimacy to Digital Customer Intimacy,” Journal of Theoretical and Applied eElectronic Commerce Research 19, no. 4: 3386–3411.
- Industry examples: Hubspot, Salesforce, and Zendesk.

== See also ==
- Rapport in Business

== Bibliography ==
- Treacy, Michael and Fred Wiersema (1993), "Customer Intimacy and Other Value Disciplines," Harvard Business Review, Jan-Feb, 84-93.
- Treacy, Michael and Fred Wiersema (1995). The Discipline of Market Leaders: Choose Your Customers, Narrow Your Focus, Dominate Your Market. Addison-Wesley.
