= Bob Buford =

American writer

- Born: September 16, 1939; Okmulgee, Oklahoma, U.S.
- Died: April 18, 2018 (aged 78); Dallas, Texas, U.S.
- Occupations: Social entrepreneur, Author
- Spouse: Linda

Bob Buford (September 16, 1939 – April 18, 2018) was an American cable-TV pioneer, social entrepreneur, author, and venture philanthropist. He co-founded Leadership Network in 1984 and later the Halftime Institute in 1998. Bob became founding chairman in 1988 of what was initially called The Peter F. Drucker Foundation for Nonprofit Management and popularized the concept of Halftime through several books he authored.

Buford was a graduate of the University of Texas at Austin and of the Owner Managed Program at Harvard. He played active roles in the Young Presidents' Organization and the World Presidents' Organization and served on the board of the Hauser Center for Nonprofit Organizations at Harvard Business School.

In the fall of 1999, Bill Pollard of ServiceMaster, Nan Stone, former editor of the Harvard Business Review, and several other people agreed that it was vitally important to preserve the writings and management ideas of Peter Drucker for the future leaders of business and nonprofit organizations. In connection with Claremont Graduate University, The Drucker Institute was created. Buford served on the board and in 2008 was appointed chairman of its board of advisors.

In 2014, Buford authored Drucker & Me (Worthy Publishing ISBN 978-161795-276-0) about Buford's 23-year relationship with Drucker. Believing non-profit organizations change lives, they worked with Rick Warren, Bill Hybels, and others to design a new management model for non-profits in the 20th century. Bob has been featured in Forbes Magazine (April 2014), Christianity Today (April 2014), and The Christian Broadcasting Network (April 2014) about his relationship and business ventures with Peter Drucker.

Bob was the recipient of Christian Management Association's 2005 Christian Management Award. Bob lived in Dallas with his wife, Linda. He died in 2018 at the age of 78.

== Publications ==
- Halftime: Changing Your Game Plan from Success to Significance (1997) ISBN 0-310-21532-3
- Game Plan (1999) ISBN 0-310-22908-1
- Stuck in Halftime: Reinvesting Your One and Only Life (2001) ISBN 0-310-23583-9
- Finishing Well: What People Who Really Live Do Differently! (2004) ISBN 1-59145-110-8
- Beyond Halftime: Practical Wisdom for Your Second Half (2008) ISBN 0-310-28423-6
- Drucker and Me (2014) Worthy Publishing ISBN 978-161795-276-0
