= The New York Times Best Seller list =

List of best-selling books in the United States

The New York Times Best Seller list is a ranking of best-selling books, published weekly by The New York Times Book Review. Widely considered the preeminent list of bestsellers in the United States, the list has been published weekly since October 12, 1931. In the 21st century, it has evolved into multiple lists, grouped by genre and format, including fiction and nonfiction, hardcover, paperback and e-books.

The list is based on a proprietary method that uses sales figures, other data and internal guidelines that are unpublished—how the Times compiles the list is a trade secret. In 1983, during a legal case in which the Times was sued, the Times argued that the list is not mathematically objective but rather an editorial product, an argument that prevailed in the courts. In 2017, a Times representative said that the goal was that the lists reflect authentic best sellers. The list has been a source of controversy. When the Times believes a book has reached the list in a suspicious way—such as through bulk purchases—the book's entry on the list is marked with a dagger symbol (†).

== History ==
External image
- New York Times best-seller list Oct. 12, 1931 The first best-seller list was published with little fanfare for books sold in New York City only.

Although the first best seller list in America was published in 1895, in The Bookman, a best seller list was not published in The New York Times until October 12, 1931, 36 years later, with little fanfare. It listed five fiction and four nonfiction books for New York City only. The next month, the list was expanded to eight cities, each with its own list. By the early 1940s, fourteen city-lists were included. A national list was created on April 9, 1942, in the Sunday New York Times Book Review as a supplement to the Monday edition regular city lists. The national list was ranked according to how many times the book appeared in the city lists. Eventually the city lists were eliminated, leaving only the national ranking list, which was compiled according to "reports from leading booksellers in 22 cities". Ranking by bookseller sales figures continues today, although the process has remained proprietary.

By the 1950s, The Times's list had become the leading best-seller list for book professionals to monitor, along with that of Publishers Weekly. In the 1960s and 1970s, shopping-mall chain bookstores B. Dalton, Crown Books, and Waldenbooks came to the forefront with a business model of selling newly published best-sellers with mass-market appeal. They used the best-selling status of titles to market the books and not just as a measure of sales, thus placing increased emphasis on the New York Times list for book readers and book sellers.

== Composition ==
The list is compiled by the editors of the "News Surveys" department, not by The New York Times Book Review department, where it is published. It is based on weekly sales reports obtained from selected samples of independent and chain bookstores and wholesalers throughout the United States. The sales figures are widely believed to represent books that have actually been sold at retail, rather than wholesale, as the Times surveys booksellers in an attempt to better reflect what is purchased by individual buyers. Some books are flagged with a dagger indicating that a significant number of bulk orders had been received by retail bookstores.

The New York Times reported in 2013 that "we [generally do not] track the sales of classic literature," and thus, for example, new translations of Dante's Inferno would not be found on the bestseller list.

The exact method for compiling the data obtained from the booksellers is classified as a trade secret. Book Review staff editor Gregory Cowles explained the method "is a secret both to protect our product and to make sure people can't try to rig the system. Even in the Book Review itself, we don't know (the news surveys department's) precise methods." In 1992, the survey encompassed over 3,000 bookstores as well as "representative wholesalers with more than 28,000 other retail outlets, including variety stores and supermarkets." By 2004, the number was 4,000 bookstores as well as an unstated number of wholesalers. Data is adjusted to give more weight to independent book stores, which are underrepresented in the sample.

The lists are divided among fiction and nonfiction, print and e-book, paperback and hardcover; each list contains 15 to 20 titles. The lists have been subdivided several times. "Advice, How-To, and Miscellaneous" debuted as a list of five on January 1, 1984. It was created because advice best-sellers were sometimes crowding the general nonfiction list. Its inaugural number one bestseller, The Body Principal by Victoria Principal, had been number 10 and number 12 on the nonfiction lists for the two preceding weeks. In July 2000, the "Children's Best Sellers" was created after the Harry Potter series had stayed in the top spots on the fiction list for an extended period of time. The children's list was printed monthly until February 13, 2011, when it was changed to once an issue (weekly). In September 2007, the paperback fiction list was divided into "trade" and "mass-market" sections, in order to give more visibility to the trade paperbacks that were more often reviewed by the newspaper itself. In November 2010, The New York Times announced it would be tracking e-book best-seller lists in fiction and nonfiction starting in early 2011. "RoyaltyShare, a San Diego–based company that tracks data and aggregates sales information for publishers, will ... provide [e-book] data". The two new e-book lists were first published with the February 13, 2011, issue, the first tracks combined print and e-book sales, the second tracks e-book sales only (both lists are further sub-divided into Fiction and Nonfiction). In addition a third new list was published on the web only, which tracks combined print sales (hardcover and paperback) in fiction and nonfiction. On December 16, 2012, the children's chapter books list was divided into two new lists: middle-grade (ages 8–12) and young adult (age 12–18), both which include sales across all platforms (hard, paper and e-book).

== Statistics ==
According to an EPJ Data Science study that used big data to analyze every New York Times bestselling book from 2008 to 2016, of the 100,000 new, hardcover print books published each year, fewer than 500 make it on to The New York Times Best Seller list (0.5 percent). Many novels (26 percent) appear on the list for only one week. To make the list, it is estimated that novels sell from 1,000 to 10,000 copies per week, depending on competition. Median sales fluctuate between 4,000 and 8,000 in fiction, and 2,000–6,000 in nonfiction. The majority of New York Times bestselling books sell from 10,000 to 100,000 copies in their first year.

During the period studied (August 6, 2008, to March 10, 2016), Dan Brown's book The Lost Symbol held the record with 3 million copies sold in one year followed by The Girl Who Kicked the Hornets' Nest by Stieg Larsson and Go Set a Watchman by Harper Lee which sold 1.6 million copies each. In nonfiction, more than half of the hardcover books that make the list are in the biography category. The autobiography of George W. Bush, Decision Points, sold the most copies in one year followed by the biography Steve Jobs by Walter Isaacson.

== Criticisms ==
The list has been criticized by authors, publishers, book industry executives, and others for not providing an accurate accounting of true best-seller status. These criticisms have been ongoing ever since the list originated. A book industry report in the 1940s found that best-seller lists were a poor indicator of sales, since they were based on misleading data and were only measuring fast sales. A 2004 report quoted a senior book marketing executive who said the rankings were "smoke and mirrors"; while a report in Book History found that many professionals in the book industry "scoffed at the notion that the lists are accurate".

Specific criticisms include:

- Fast sales. A book that never makes the list can actually outsell books on the best-seller list. This is because the best-seller list reflects sales in a given week, not total sales. Thus, one book may sell heavily in a given week, making the list, while another may sell at a slower pace, never making the list, but selling more copies over time.
- Double counting. By including wholesalers in the polls along with retail bookstores, books may be double-counted. Wholesalers report how much they sell to retailers, and retailers report how much they sell to customers, thus there can be overlap with the same reported book being sold twice within a given time frame. In addition, retailers may return books to wholesalers months later if they never sell, thus resulting in a "sale" being reported that never came to fruition. For example, mass-market paperbacks can see as high as 40% return rates from the retailer back to the wholesaler.
- Manipulation by authors and publishers. In 1956, author Jean Shepherd created the fake novel I, Libertine to illustrate how easy it was to manipulate the best-seller lists based on demand, as well as sales. Fans of Shepherd's radio show planted references to the book and author so widely that demand for the book led to claims of it being on the Times list. Author Jacqueline Susann (Valley of the Dolls) attempted to "butter-up" Times-reporting booksellers and personally bought large quantities of her own book. Author Wayne Dyer (Your Erroneous Zones) purchased thousands of copies of his own book. Al Neuharth (Confessions of an S. O. B.), former head of Gannett Company, had his Gannett Foundation buy two thousand copies of his own autobiography. In 1995, authors Michael Treacy and Fred Wiersema spent $200,000 to buy ten thousand copies of The Discipline of Market Leaders from dozens of bookstores. Although they denied any wrongdoing, the book spent 15 weeks on the list. As a result of this scandal the Times began placing a dagger symbol next to any title for which bookstores reported bulk orders. However, daggers do not always appear; for example Tony Hsieh's Delivering Happiness was known to have been manipulated with bulk orders but did not have a dagger. Companies that contract with authors to manipulate the bestseller list through "bestseller campaigns" include ResultSource.
- Manipulation by retailers and wholesalers. It happens with regularity that wholesalers and retailers deliberately or inadvertently manipulate the sales data they report to the Times. Since being on the Times best-seller list increases the sales of a book, bookstores and wholesalers may report a book is a best-seller before it actually is one, in order that it might later become a "legitimate" best-seller through increased sales due to its inclusion on the best-seller list, leading to the best-seller list becoming a self-fulfilling prophecy for the booksellers.
- Leading data collection. The Times provides booksellers with a form containing a list of books it believes might be bestsellers, to check off, with an alternative "Other" column to fill in manually. It has been criticized as a leading technique to create a best-seller list based on books the Times thinks might be included. One bookseller compared it to a voting card in which two options for president are provided: "Bill Clinton and Other".
- Self-fulfilling. Once a book makes it onto the list it is heavily marketed as a "best-seller", purchased by readers who seek out best-sellers, given preferential treatment by retailers, online and offline, who create special best-seller categories including special in-store placement and price discounts, and is carried by retailers that generally do not carry other books (e.g., supermarkets). Thus, the list can become self-fulfilling in determining which books have high sales and remain on the list.
- Conflicts of interest. Due to high financial impact of making the list, since the 1970s publishers have created escalator clauses for major authors stipulating that if a book makes the list the author will receive extra money, based on where it ranks and for how long. Authors may also be able to charge higher speaking fees for the status of being a best-seller. As Book History said, "With so much at stake then, it is no wonder that enormous marketing effort goes into getting a book access to this major marketing tool."
- Political bias. A 2024 investigation by The Economist concluded that the list was likely "politically biased", reporting that "accusations of bias against conservative books may have merit".

== Controversies ==
In 1983, author William Peter Blatty sued The New York Times for $6 million, claiming that his book Legion, filmed as The Exorcist III, had not been included in the list due to either negligence or intentional falsehood, saying it should have been included due to high sales. The Times countered that the list was not mathematically objective but rather was an editorial product and thus protected under the Constitution as free speech. Blatty appealed it to the Supreme Court, which declined to hear the case. Thus, the lower court ruling stood that the list is editorial content, not objective factual content, so the Times had the legal right to exclude the book from the list.

In 1995, Michael Treacy and Fred Wiersema, the authors of a book called The Discipline of Market Leaders, colluded to manipulate their book onto the best seller charts. The authors allegedly purchased over 10,000 copies of their own book in small and strategically placed orders at bookstores whose sales are reported to BookScan. Because of the benefits of making The New York Times Best Seller list (speaking engagements, more book deals, and consulting) the authors felt that buying their own work was an investment that would pay for itself. The book climbed to No. 4 on the list where it sat for 15 weeks; it also peaked at No. 1 on the BusinessWeek best seller list. Since such lists hold the power of cumulative advantage, chart success often begets more chart success. Although such efforts are not illegal, publishers consider them unethical.

In 1999, Amazon.com announced a 50% decrease in price for books on the Best Seller List to beat its competition, Barnes & Noble. After a legal dispute between Amazon and The New York Times, Amazon was permitted to keep using the list on condition that it displayed it in alphabetical rather than numerical order. By 2010, this was no longer the case; Amazon now displays the best-seller list in order of best-selling titles first.

In 2013, Forbes published a story titled "Here's How You Buy Your Way Onto The New York Times Bestsellers List." The article discusses how ResultSource, a San Diego–based marketing consultancy, specializes in ensuring books make a bestseller list, even guaranteeing a No. 1 spot for those willing to pay enough. The New York Times was informed of this practice and responded: "The New York Times comprehensively tracks and tabulates the weekly unit sales of all titles reported by book retailers as their general interest bestsellers. We will not comment beyond our methodology on the other questions." The New York Times did not alert its readers to this, unlike The Wall Street Journal, which admitted that books had landed on its bestseller list due to ResultSource's campaign. Soren Kaplan, the source who admitted he had paid ResultSource to land his book, Leapfrogging, on The Wall Street Journal's bestseller list, revealed the methodology on his blog; he posted: "If I could obtain bulk orders before Leapfrogging was released, ResultSource would purchase the books on my behalf using their tried-and-true formula. Three thousand books sold would get me on The Wall Street Journal bestseller list. Eleven thousand would secure a spot on the biggest prize of them all, The New York Times list."

In 2014, the Los Angeles Times published a story titled "Can bestseller lists be bought?" It describes how author and pastor Mark Driscoll contracted the company ResultSource to place his book Real Marriage (2012) on The New York Times Best Seller list for a $200,000 fee. The contract was for ResultSource "to conduct a bestseller campaign for your book, Real Marriage on the week of January 2, 2012. The bestseller campaign is intended to place Real Marriage on The New York Times bestseller list for the Advice How-to list." To achieve this, the contract stated that "RSI will be purchasing at least 11,000 total orders in one week." This took place, and the book successfully reached No.1 on the hardcover advice bestseller list on January 22, 2014.

In July 2015, Ted Cruz's book A Time For Truth was excluded from the list because the "overwhelming preponderance of evidence was that sales [of Cruz's book] were limited to strategic bulk purchases" to artificially increase sales and entry onto the list. In response, Cruz called the Times "a liar" and demanded an apology. The Times said it stood by its statement and evidence of manipulation.

In August 2017, a young adult fiction book, Handbook for Mortals by previously unpublished author Lani Sarem was removed from the list, where it was initially in the No. 1 spot. According to a statement issued by the Times, "after investigating the inconsistencies in the most recent reporting cycle, we decided that the sales for Handbook for Mortals did not meet our criteria for inclusion. We've issued an updated 'Young Adult Hardcover' list for September 3, 2017 which does not include that title." It was uncovered, by author Phil Stamper, that there had been unusual bulk ordering patterns which inflated the number of sales. The book is published by GeekNation, an entertainment website based in Los Angeles. The book was originally written as a script, and was rewritten as a novel in an attempt to launch a film franchise.

In August 2017, conservative publisher Regnery Publishing said it would no longer allow its writers to claim to be "New York Times best-selling authors" due to its belief that the Times favors liberal books on the list. The Times responded that the political views of authors have no bearing on the list and noted conservative authors routinely rank highly on the list. The Associated Press noted the Times is a frequent target of conservatives and Republicans. The Washington Post called Regnery's ban a "stunt" designed to increase sales, "What better way to sell a book to a conservative audience than to promote the idea that the New York Times doesn't like it?" The Post compared the list to best seller lists from Publishers Weekly looking for bias but could not find anything convincing.

In February 2018, the Toronto Star published a story by books editor Deborah Dundas who found that the best-selling book 12 Rules for Life by Jordan Peterson, who topped Publishers Weekly chart list, did not even chart on The New York Times bestsellers list, without reliable answers from the New York Times. The Times stated it was not counted because it was published by a Canadian company. According to Random House Canada, the book was handled properly for the U.S. market. American conservative commentator Dennis Prager wrote an article for National Review titled "The Times Best-Seller List: Another Reason Americans Don't Trust the Media" in which he contends that the issue with Peterson's book, as well his The Rational Bible: Exodus, is their conservative context and the lack of inclusion is the American mainstream media's manipulation. The Times denied any bias.

In 2019, the release of Donald Trump Jr.'s book Triggered was shown to have only reached the best-seller list through approximately $100,000 in behind-the-scenes bulk purchases meant to pump up its sales numbers illegitimately. Vanity Fair reported in October 2020 that this sort of gaming of the system has been a common practice among American conservative political figures, and has also included the use of political campaign funds to purchase the books in bulk in order to boost their rank on the list.

== Studies ==
A Stanford Graduate School of Business analysis suggests that the "majority of book buyers seem to use the Times' list as a signal of what's worth reading". The study concluded that lesser-known writers get the biggest benefit from being on the list, while perennial best-selling authors, such as John Grisham or Danielle Steel, see no benefit of additional sales.

== See also ==
- Lists of The New York Times number-one books
- Lists of The New York Times Manga Best Sellers
- Oprah's Book Club
- Publishers Weekly lists of bestselling novels in the United States
- USA Today Best-Selling Books
