= ResultSource =

Book marketing company

- Industry: Book Marketing
- Founded: 7 August 2006
- Headquarters: San Diego, California, United States

ResultSource was a San Diego–based book marketing company that conducts "bestseller campaigns" on behalf of authors. The company states "We create campaigns that reach a specific goal, like: 'On the bestsellers list', or '100,000 copies sold'." For example, for a negotiated fee ResultSource will guarantee that a book becomes a bestseller. It does this through bulk book buying programs designed to manipulate the metrics used by Nielsen BookScan and the New York Times Best Seller list, among other strategies. As a result of ResultSource's business practices, Amazon.com has stopped doing business with the company. The company was founded by Kevin Small.

The details of ResultSource's business are private and few in the publishing industry will speak openly about it. "It's no wonder few people in the industry want to talk about bestseller campaigns. Put bluntly, they allow people with enough money, contacts, and know-how to buy their way onto bestseller lists." However, some information has come to light. In 2013, author Soren Kaplan discussed the matter with The Wall Street Journal in an article titled "The Mystery of the Book Sales Spike – How Are Some Authors Landing On Best-Seller Lists? They're Buying Their Way". In 2014, the Los Angeles Times published a story titled "Can bestseller lists be bought?" It describes how author and pastor Mark Driscoll contracted with ResultSource to place his book Real Marriage on the New York Times bestseller list for a $200,000 fee. The contract was for ResultSource "to conduct a bestseller campaign for your book, Real Marriage, on the week of January 2, 2012. The bestseller campaign is intended to place Real Marriage on the New York Times bestseller list for the Advice How-to list." To achieve this, the contract stated that "RSI will be purchasing at least 11,000 total orders in one week." This took place and, as a result, the book was successfully ranked No. 1 on the hardcover advice bestseller list on January 22, 2014. Driscoll later published an apology letter.

ResultSource was also implicated in Handbook for Mortals' 23-hour stint at the top of the New York Times Bestseller List.

Due to negative press about the company, it stopped operations in 2014.

== See also ==
- Vanity award
