= Michael Paulson =

American journalist

Michael Paulson is an American journalist. From 2000 to 2010 he covered religion for The Boston Globe. Since 2010, he has worked at the New York Times, where he initially continued his religion coverage. His work there reflected his early political roots and continued to tie religion to national issues. Since April 2015, he has covered theater at the New York Times.

== Personal ==
Paulson is a native of Newton, Massachusetts, and now lives in New York City. He graduated from Newton South High School and obtained his degree from Haverford College.

== Career ==
Mr. Paulson was the National Religion reporter for the New York Times. While working for The Boston Globe, Paulson was responsible for covering the world's faith and spirituality. He began working for The Boston Globe in January 2000. Prior to this, his career included seven years working as a city hall reporter, a state house bureau chief, and as a Washington correspondent at the Seattle Post-Intelligencer. Before that he worked as a political reporter for the San Antonio Light in Texas.

== Books ==
Paulson co-authored the book, "Betrayal: The Crisis in the Catholic Church".

== Awards ==
Paulson won a number of awards which include:

- In 2003, he shared in the Pulitzer Prize for his coverage of child abuse affairs in the archdiocese of Boston. He has also won the Mike Berger, Templeton and Supple awards in 2008, and is a four-time winner of the Religion Communicators Council's Wilbur Award for his coverage of the Boston archdiocese abuse scandal, the elevation of Episcopal Bishop Gene Robinson, closing parishes, and the death of Pope John Paul II.
- Associated Press Managing Editors' Freedom of Information Award
- Goldsmith Prize for Investigative Reporting
- George Polk Award
- A medal from Investigative Reporters and Editors
- Selden Ring Award
- Sigma Delta Chi Award from the Society of Professional Journalists
- Taylor Family Award
- Worth Bingham Award
- The New York Times Company's Punch Sulzberger Award
- His team also won a media award from the Massachusetts Association and the Spirit Award from Jane Doe Inc.

== See also ==
- Catholic sex abuse cases
