= Warren Throckmorton =

American psychologist

Earl Warren Throckmorton (born 1957) is an American psychologist and retired professor of psychology at Grove City College in Grove City, Pennsylvania. He developed the sexual identity therapy framework and was a creator of the documentary I Do Exist, about people who say they have changed their sexual orientation. He is an example of an evangelical Christian who has changed his view about human sexuality, from traditional to more progressive.

== Education ==
Throckmorton received his B.A. in psychology in 1979 from Cedarville University, an M.A. in clinical psychology from Central Michigan University in 1982, and a Ph.D. in counselor education and community counseling from Ohio University in 1992.

== Sexual identity and the Bible ==
Throckmorton's work on sexual identity therapy was endorsed by psychiatrist Robert L. Spitzer. The purpose of these recommendations is to help patients make their sexual identity conform to their beliefs and values.

Throckmorton has been involved in controversy over the origins and treatment of variations in gender identity. The February 2008 issue of Christianity Today carried an article discussing how Throckmorton has advised people who are in agony over being transgender that their desires are not in accord with the Bible. "Even if science does determine differentiation in the brain at birth," Throckmorton says, "even if there are prenatal influences, we can't set aside teachings of the Bible, because of research findings." Throckmorton subsequently argued that these comments were quoted "out of context". On his blog, he stated that people should consult physicians, specialists, and spiritual advisors in resolving their feelings. If someone decides that sexual reassignment violates faith, then this feeling may guide their decisions.

Journalist Jeff Sharlet said that Throckmorton has allowed data and evidence to shape his views "in a way very few people of any ideological or political stripe would." That article goes on to trace Throckmorton's on-going development of his views on human sexuality and the Bible, which he still believes is divinely inspired. To say it more clearly, Throckmorton has blogged: "After working with LGBT people for two decades, I believe some people are inherently gay."

== Books ==
- Throckmorton, Warren (1996). "Mental health counselors and third party reimbursement". In Weikel, William J.; Palmo, Artis J. (eds.). Foundations of mental health counseling (2nd ed.). Springfield, Ill.: Charles C Thomas. pp. 283–312. ISBN 0-398-06669-8.
- Throckmorton, Warren & Coulter, Michael (2012). Getting Jefferson Right: Fact Checking Claims about Our Third President. Salem Grove Press. ISBN 978-0974670614., a rebuttal to The Jefferson Lies by David Barton
