= Acts 29 Network =

Christian network

Acts 29
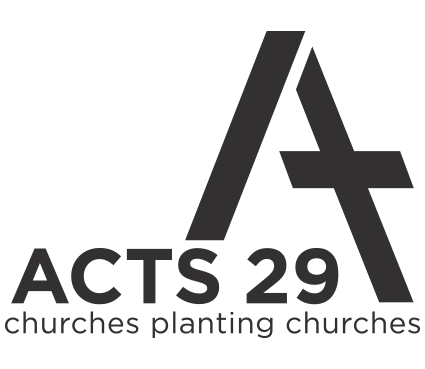
- Classification: Protestant
- Orientation: Evangelical
- Theology: Reformed
- President: Brian Howard
- Executive director: Matt Chandler
- Founder: Mark Driscoll; David Nicholas
- Origin: 1998
- Congregations: 730
- Official website: acts29.com

Acts 29 is a global family of church planting churches that adheres to Reformed or New Calvinist theology. It derives its name from the Book of Acts in the New Testament, which has 28 chapters, making Acts 29 the "next chapter" in the history of the church. A number of other Christian organizations also use the phrase "Acts 29" in their respective names.

== History ==
Acts 29 was founded in 1998 by Mark Driscoll and David Nicholas. Beginning September 17, 2007, with the Raleigh Boot Camp, Acts 29 began using Great Commission Ministries as its mission agency for fundraising and leadership training. Matt Chandler was appointed as the president of Acts 29 Network in 2012. Chandler announced plans to keep the network's objectives intact while reorganizing to address the global scope of the organization. The offices and leadership of Acts 29 moved from Mars Hill Church in Seattle to The Village Church in Texas in March 2012. The offices of Acts 29 are now in Mission Viejo, California.

In August 2014, Acts 29 removed Mark Driscoll and Mars Hill Church from its membership. According to the Acts 29 Board, this was due to "the nature of the accusations against Mark, most of which have been confirmed by him." Subsequent years saw the network restructure, with a focus on diversification, financial accountability and devolved leadership, transforming "from an American-based network to a diverse global family of church-planting churches".

== Board members ==
As of January 28, 2024, its board consisted of:

- Brian Howard — president
- Matt Chandler — executive chairman
- Hunter Beaumont — board member
- Rodney Hobbs — board member
- Chris Lewis — board member

== Character ==
Acts 29 is a global family of church planting churches that originated in North America and now has representation in Europe, Australia and New Zealand, Latin and South America, Africa, and Asia.

Acts 29 has been described as part of the emerging church. However, Darrin Patrick, former vice president of Acts 29 has pointed out "bad things" in the emerging church such as "the fascination with deconstructing almost everything while building almost nothing", and "ugly things" such as "conversing about God's Word [the Bible] to the neglect of obeying it, deviating from historical orthodoxy and the lack of clarity regarding issues of theology and sexuality."

== Reactions ==
Steve Lemke of the New Orleans Baptist Theological Seminary cited interactions with Acts 29 instead of local Baptist churches on the part of Pleasant Valley Community Church in Owensboro, Kentucky, as a reason they were denied acceptance into the Daviess–McLean Baptist Association, saying, "those who want to be accepted should make themselves acceptable."

Roger Moran, a former member of the Southern Baptist Convention's executive committee and head of the Missouri Baptist Layman's Association has criticized Acts 29 on matters of doctrine, vulgarity and drinking. In his view, Acts 29 and other emerging church movements have become a "dangerous and deceptive infiltration of Baptist life".

Christian Piatt of the Huffington Post has criticized the network for disguising the traditional evangelical agenda of conformity and conversion behind the veneer of the new missional church movement. He also criticizes the emphasis on male leadership.

Acts 29 churches have faced criticism for a number of high-profile church discipline issues. On April 13, 2016, then vice president of the network Darrin Patrick was removed from his position at The Journey for misconduct and was required to step down from all external leadership positions. In February 2020, it was announced that Steve Timmis had been removed from the position of CEO of the Acts 29 Network amid allegations of an abusive leadership style; five staff members had previously raised similar concerns with Chandler in 2015, only to be fired and asked to sign non-disclosure agreements. On February 26, 2026, Acts 29 Vice President Tyler Jones, formerly of Vintage Church in Raleigh, North Carolina, was removed from his role after confessing to a "long-term extramarital relationship."

Criticisms have also been made over how church discipline has been conducted. The Village Church in Dallas offered a general apology after a female member was disciplined for annulling her marriage to a man who admitted to viewing child pornography. No elders or leaders were removed from their offices, but the church said in an email that the action taken against the woman was "unbefitting" of a church leader.

== See also ==
- New Calvinism
