= Purity culture =

1990s Christian movement

Purity culture was a youth-focused movement starting in the 1990s within Christianity which emphasized sexual abstinence before marriage, though its definition has recently been used more broadly to be defined as "a multidimensional (religion-unspecific) construct exerting control through behavioral regulation, shame induction, and framing sexual abstinence as a moral imperative."

Prominent in American Christian communities in the 1990s, purity culture emphasizes modest dress for women, strict gender roles, and discouragement of casual dating and masturbation, tying sexual behavior closely to spiritual identity and communal belonging. Practices like purity balls, virginity pledges, and purity rings reinforce these ideals. Though it faded in popularity after the 2000s, its influence persists both in the United States and abroad.

== Components ==
Purity culture places a strong emphasis on abstinence from sexual intercourse before marriage. Women and girls are told to cover up and dress modestly to avoid arousing sexual urges in men and boys. Purity culture also emphasizes traditional gender roles. Casual dating is discouraged entirely to avoid premarital sex. Purity cultures establish comprehensive moral systems in which sexual behavior is closely tied to spiritual identity, gender roles, and communal belonging. They can result in sexual violence that is characterized by the imposition of rigid and often unrealistic standards on individuals, often resulting in adverse physical, emotional and psychological consequences for those who do not conform to these expectations.

=== Abstinence pledges ===
An abstinence pledge is when an adolescent promises not to have sex until marriage. This pledge is typically public. Abstinence pledges are also sometimes referred to as "virginity pledges", as they are pledging to keep their virginity until marriage. It is believed the abstinence pledges decrease the risk of pre-marital pregnancy. Girls who break their abstinence pledges have higher rates of human papillomavirus (HPV) and pre-marital pregnancies, as opposed to those who do not pledge. Even though purity culture as a whole has faded in popularity, it still exists, just as abstinence pledges still exist. As recently as 2017, it was reported that approximately 12% of young women pledge abstinence in the United States alone.

=== Purity balls ===
A purity ball is a formal dance event. The events are attended by fathers and their teenage daughters in order to promote virginity until marriage. Typically, daughters who attend a purity ball make a virginity pledge to remain sexually abstinent until marriage. Fathers who attend a purity ball make a promise to protect their young daughters' "purity of mind, body, and soul." Proponents of these events believe that they encourage close and deeply affectionate relationships between fathers and daughters, thereby avoiding the premarital sexual activity that allegedly results when young women seek love through relationships with young men. Critics of the balls argue that they encourage and engrave dysfunctional expectations in the minds of the young women, making them vulnerable to believing their only value is as property, and teaching them that they must subjugate their own mental, physical, and emotional needs to that of abusive partners.

=== Purity rings ===
Since the 1990s Christian organizations, especially Catholic and evangelical Christian groups, promoting virginity pledges and virginity before marriage, like True Love Waits and Silver Ring Thing, used the purity ring as a symbol of commitment to purity culture.

== History ==
The ideas the movement drew on were much older than the movement itself. In her history of the concept, Hanne Blank defines virginity not as a physical state but as “a human sexual status that is characterized by a lack of any current or prior sexual interaction with others,” and argues that it has never had a single stable physical definition. The expectations attached to it, such as the belief that a bride would bleed on her wedding night, were likewise culturally scripted rather than medically grounded, with women’s accounts of first intercourse tending to conform to what their culture had taught them to expect.

Purity culture had been a facet of Christian writing for some time, but purity culture as a youth movement took hold in the 1990s. A whole industry selling books, rings, and other products emerged around the movement. Specifically, purity culture is heavily promoted by evangelical Christians. It has mostly been aimed towards white women.

Some of the roots of purity culture are in sexism. Women are taught to cover up, as men cannot control their sexual desires and urges. Some other aspects are rooted in the breakdown of the traditional family structure. With the AIDS crisis and teen pregnancy on the rise in the early 1990s, evangelicals saw traditional family values as threatened.

The first purity ball was held in 1998.

Purity culture faded out of popularity after the end of the 2000s.

== Effects and legacy ==
Purity culture is largely an American phenomenon although it has been exported abroad by American religious and government groups. It has also influenced groups like Girl Defined.

Another way that purity culture can still be seen is in abstinence-only sex education. This form of education is heavily emphasized in purity culture. Many schools, including religious schools, teach abstinence-only sex education, or put a heavy emphasis on abstinence while teaching.

Studies on abstinence, premarital sex, and purity culture show various outcomes. According to a 2004 peer-reviewed study published in the Journal of Marriage and Family found that women who have more than one premarital sexual relationship have a higher likelihood in the long run of disruptions if ever married, with this effect being the "strongest for women who have multiple premarital co-residential unions". Kahn and London (1991) found that premarital sex and divorce are positively correlated. Other studies have shown that those who focused on abstinence when they were younger faced anxiety, guilt, and other sexual problems as they became adults. Studies have shown that women who grew up in purity culture reported increased feelings of shame and fear around sex. A number of studies have found that those who take an abstinence pledge "are more likely to delay sexual involvement, have fewer sex partners, and marry earlier."

== See also ==
- Abstinence-only sex education
- Antisexualism
- Born-again virgin
- Celibacy
- Chastity
- Chastity clubs in the United States
