= Born-again virgin =

Person who commits to abstinence after having had sexual intercourse

A born-again virgin (also known as a secondary virgin) is a person who, after having engaged in sexual intercourse, makes some type of commitment not to be sexually active again. Often, this commitment is intended to last until the adherent enters a marriage. It can more broadly refer to any kind of re-identification as a virgin, for whatever reason, and however virginity is defined.

The concept has been taught in abstinence-only sex education courses, and more commonly used among evangelical and fundamentalist Christians, who place a strong emphasis on abstinence from premarital and extramarital relations. Christian organizations such as True Love Waits or Silver Ring Thing have promoted versions that also encouraged born-again virgins to make a virginity pledge, in the form of a "written, web-based, or public ceremonial declaration".

== History ==
The concept of "born-again virginity" was first popularized in the United States in the 1980s, by abstinence-based sex education books; this curricula then gained further exposure in the 1990s and 2000s, particularly with the imposition of abstinence-based sex education on schools as a result of a national welfare reform law passed in 1996.

== In popular culture ==
In season 9 of the popular medical drama Grey's Anatomy, Dr. April Kepner, then an attending physician at Seattle Grace-Mercy West Hospital, announces that she is "revirginizing" after having sex with fellow resident Dr. Jackson Avery. This does not last long, as she has sex with him again at the end of the episode.

In season 3, episode 16 of The Last Man on Earth, Todd reclaimed his virginity prior to his wedding by abstaining from intercourse with his fiancée, Melissa, until their wedding.

In the episode "Luanne Virgin 2.0" of King of the Hill, Luanne and Peggy restore their virginity by participating in a ceremony headed by their minister.

In season 9, episode 8 of Supernatural, Rock and a Hard Place, Sam and Dean both reclaim their virginity in order to investigate a missing persons case revolving around a chastity group, which all the victims were once a part of.

== See also ==
- Born again (Christianity)
- Chastity clubs in the United States
- Fornication
- Hymen reconstruction surgery
- Josephite marriage
- Purity ball
- Purity ring
- Sexual ethics
- Slut shaming
- Virginity test
