= Chastity clubs in the United States =

Chastity clubs in the United States emerged in the 1990s for adolescents (primarily girls) in elementary through high school. The rise of these clubs occurred alongside the rise of purity culture in the U.S. which promoted sexual chastity before marriage, including purity balls, sexual purity organizations, and government-funded abstinence-only sex education. Chastity clubs for adolescents came out of evangelical backlash to what they perceived as a new hyper-sexualized culture and a rise in sexual impurity. Soon, students at universities in the South began to form their own chastity clubs.

In the early 2000s, students at elite colleges in the northeast created purity clubs, beginning with Princeton University's The Anscombe Society, which still exists in 2024. These university clubs sought to counter the culture of casual, normalized, and expected sex at their schools. Unlike chastity clubs for adolescents which promoted chastity on grounds of religion and obedience, university chastity clubs utilized philosophical and scientific explanations. Many university chastity clubs defined marriage as between a man and a woman, some of which explicitly condemned same-sex marriage. They also defined men and women as inherently different. Many university students wrote op-eds critiquing these chastity clubs and scholars have written critiques as well.

== History ==
=== Purity culture in the United States ===
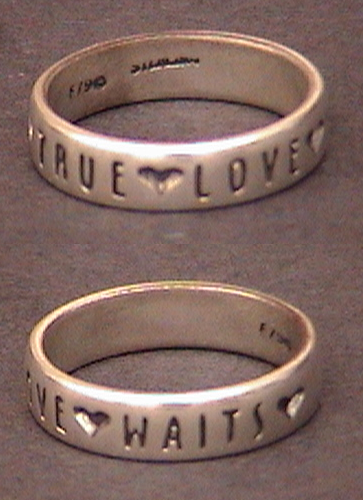
"True Love Waits" chastity rings

While rhetoric about sexual purity and chastity existed throughout the late 19th and 20th centuries, the term purity culture often refers to the rise in government-funded abstinence-only education, purity balls, and chastity clubs in the United States in the 1990s and into the 21st century. Purity movements emerged in largely evangelical Christian contexts in the 1990s, though also existing within broader American contexts through pro-abstinence legislation and chastity clubs at elite universities. Purity culture calls for sexual chastity and abstinence before marriage. Operating with traditional gender roles, purity culture often posits modesty in dress as a way to avoid arousing sexual urges in men and defines marriage as strictly between a man and a woman.

=== HIV/AIDS ===
While HIV/AIDS has a longer history globally, the first cases were reported in the U.S. in 1981. As of 2018, about 700,000 people in the United States had died from HIV/AIDS. Purity culture movements emerged in the 1990s in the context of the HIV/AIDS epidemic, framing sexual purity until marriage as the solution to the epidemic and other sexually transmitted diseases.

=== Bush administration ===
Prior to the Bush administration, the Welfare Reform Act of 1996 introduced government-funded abstinence-only sexual education programs in public schools, with $50 million set aside each year for abstinence education. During George W. Bush's presidency (2001–2009), Congress and the Bush administration continued to build upon the Welfare Reform Act, heavily funding abstinence-only education programs in public middle schools and high schools. Abstinence-only education in schools rose from 2 percent to 23 percent between 1988 and 1999. In 2003, funding for abstinence-only education reached $120 million.

During Bush's presidency, various government websites altered their information about sexual health. In 2002, the Centers for Disease Control and Prevention (CDC) removed information about condom use from its website in connection to Bush Administration regulations.

In 1999, Bush spoke at a True Love Waits rally, stating that "abstinence is 100 percent certain to not only make sure that children avoid pregnancy, but it's 100 percent certain to make sure that children avoid disease." However, amidst this outlook, which also viewed chastity as the solution to HIV/AIDS, promoting abstinence or signing a virginity pledge did not result in a decrease in sexually transmitted diseases, as teenagers who took virginity pledges were much less likely to use condoms when they did have their first sexual experience, according to a 2005 study.

=== Rise of sexual purity organizations ===
Throughout the 1990s and 2000s, various groups promoting chastity and abstinence formed. These were largely evangelical Christian organizations. In 1993, Southern Baptist youth minister Richard Ross founded True Love Waits, a Christian sex-education program promoting premarital sexual abstinence. Focused on presenting the topic of chastity to audiences of teenagers, True Love Waits organized virginity pledges among youth as well as other events and rallies that sold Bible-study materials related to sexual purity.

== Clubs for adolescents ==
Girls in elementary through high school formed the majority of members of chastity clubs. Chastity clubs for adolescents began to grow in the early 1990s, alongside a rise in increased funding for abstinence-only sex education, evangelical Christian backlash to what they understood to be a hyper-sexualized culture, high rates of teen pregnancy, and President Clinton's affair with Monica Lewinsky. Evangelical Christians formed chastity clubs to push back against this culture which they believed taught young people to have sex. These clubs continued to grow with the election of President George W. Bush who funded abstinence-only education, defunded comprehensive sex education, and promoted misinformation about sexual health. These girls were recruited on the grounds of religion and obedience. During this time, millions of teenagers pledged premarital sexual abstinence, largely because of the belief that premarital sex was a sin.

== Clubs at universities ==
Chastity clubs began to form at universities in the South in the early 1990s. They then emerged at elite universities in the Northeast in the early 2000s. Chastity clubs continued to spread among elite universities with the support of groups such as the Love & Fidelity Network, which began in 2007 and worked to establish organizations promoting chastity at college campuses. Chastity clubs for college students were unlike those for adolescents, as the students had more autonomy than young adults. The students formed them in response to what they believed was a hyper-sexualized culture of universities and the rise of a hookup culture.

These clubs, unlike those for girls aged seven to fifteen who were seen as not yet having sexual desires, aimed to encourage sexual restraint to resist the pressures of hook-up culture and sexual exploration. They hosted events, including lectures, discussion panels, and study sessions that promoted abstinence. The clubs encouraged college students to take on a "pure" and "dignified" lifestyle. They stressed the dangers of premarital sex and portrayed marriage as the only way to accomplish a sexually healthy and happy life. Many of the chastity clubs at elite universities also spread inaccurate sexual health information and elicited feelings of fear and intimidation to dissuade students from having premarital sex.

Some examples of chastity clubs at universities include the following:

=== Princeton: The Anscombe Society ===
Princeton University's The Anscombe Society was the first chastity club to be founded at an Ivy League university. The club was founded in 2005 by a group of students, many of whom were Catholic and conservative, who presented the club as secular in order to get credibility from the student body. The club sought to counter the hook-up culture of the university which they believed allowed and expected students to be sexually active. The founders claimed they did not want to morally judge students, but instead provide information about "health and safety issues" associated with premarital and casual sex, and to ultimately promote dignity. They used moral and ethical arguments to support a chaste lifestyle for college students and argue that an unchaste lifestyle leads to "personal unhappiness and social harm."

As of May 2024, the club still exists, aiming to promote "dignified, respectful, and beautiful sex"; "affirming and supportive" relationships "where no one is objectified, instrumentalized, or demeaned"; and marriage between a mother with "authentic femininity" and father with "true masculinity."

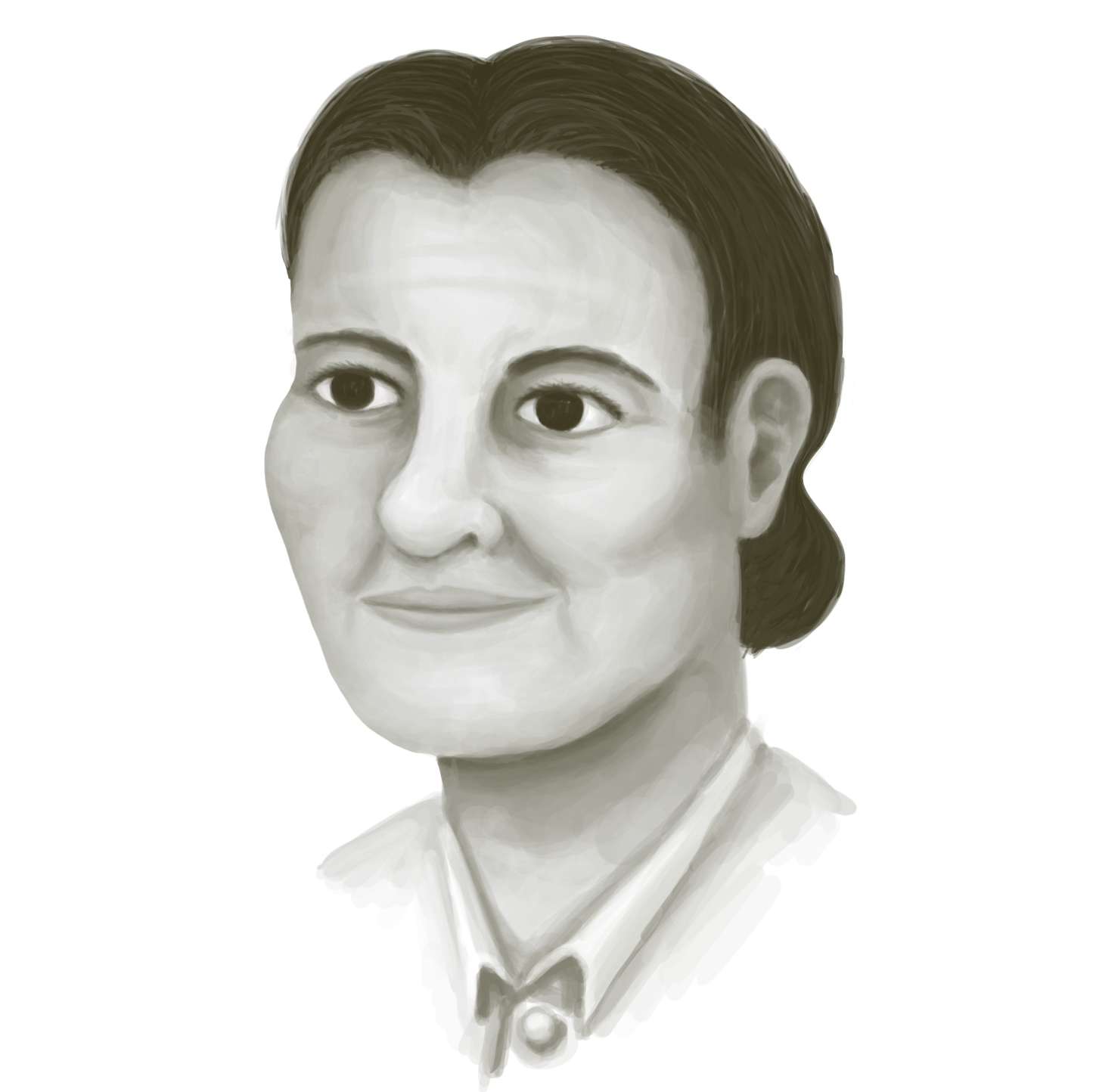
Elizabeth Anscombe

==== Elizabeth Anscombe ====
Beginning with Princeton's The Anscombe Society, many elite university's chastity clubs were named after Elizabeth Anscombe (1919–2001). Anscombe was a British philosopher and Roman Catholic from Cambridge University and student of Austrian philosopher Ludwig Wittgenstein. In a 1977 essay, "Contraception and Chastity", she argued a philosophical defense of the Catholic papacy's strict restrictions on sexual behavior, making her well known among Roman Catholics. Her use of logic to denounce pre-marital sex appealed to the Princeton students who formed the club, then who were followed by other elite university students.

=== Massachusetts Institute of Technology: The Anscombe Society ===
Massachusetts Institute of Technology (MIT) was the second elite university to create a chastity club and followed Princeton's club with their own Anscombe Society in 2006. According to their website, their mission was to promote a life of chastity as "the most beautiful life for a human being" and sought to dispel the negative preconceptions about the chaste life. The club had a chastity pledge which 40 members had signed by 2007, reading, "I commit myself to make an effort to live a chaste lifestyle. A chaste lifestyle involves using the gift of my body honorably and respectfully."

Their method to achieve their mission was largely intellectual, aiming to encourage students to reflect on their views on and beliefs about sex, sexual behavior, and marriage. They sought to promote "intellectual argument" about the relationship between men and women and sexual ethics, welcoming people with all viewpoints to their events. According to their website, in order to create an intellectual defense for chastity and promote discussions and debates about it, they provided members with scholarly articles and brought speakers on campus that discussed chastity.

=== Harvard: True Love Revolution (2006–2012), Harvard College Anscombe Society (2012–2019) ===
In 2006, Harvard's chastity club the True Love Revolution was founded by couple Sarah Kinsella and Justin Murray in 2006. Like Princeton's The Anscombe Society, the club did not mention God or religion in promoting abstinence in order to appeal to a wider audience. Unlike Princeton's club, the True Love Revolution sought to promote premarital sexual abstinence through scientific rather than philosophical arguments, utilizing scholarly journals to support the importance of abstinence.

Harvard's club promoted the idea that, according to their website, "safe sex is not safe," emphasizing that contraception can fail and that premarital sex leads to dangerous physical and mental health consequences. Much of their website and claims utilized misinformation, including claims that early sexual activity often caused a greater likelihood of marital infidelity, divorce, maternal poverty, and depression. Their website also falsely claimed that abstinence was the only way to avoid sexually transmitted infections and that condoms did not work to prevent HPV and many other STIs. They emphasized that abstinence improves relationships before marriage, as it creates trust and respect.

The club's events gained notoriety, as founders Sarah Kinsella and Justin Murray were interviewed in multiple major news outlets. The club's first event caused negative reactions on campus, when they sent valentines to every female freshman that said, "Why wait? Because you're worth it" which many students perceived as perpetuating the idea that women who participate in premarital sex are worth less and spread sexist stereotypes.

In 2008, Janie Fredell took leadership over the club, and along with speaking to many news outlets, eventually also toured colleges across America to speak about the True Love Revolution. After Fredell took over the club, on Valentine's Day of 2008, the club sent the same "Why wait? Because you're worth it" valentines to both male and female freshmen. Fredell believed there was a double standard that belittled women while appraising men who had premarital sex. She identified as an "unconventional feminist" who, rather than teaching women to use their bodily autonomy to have sex ("sex like a man"), taught women to use their bodily autonomy to choose not to have sex ("by telling men no, absolutely not").

Over time, the club shifted toward political advocacy and changed its name to Harvard College Anscombe Society in 2012. In 2009, the club published public position statements declaring same-sex marriage as harmful and affirming heterosexual "traditional" marriage. They also promoted the essential differences between men and women. According to an article by the Harvard Crimson in 2012, many students reacted negatively to these changes, including past members.

The club gradually became less popular and ended in 2019.

=== Stanford: Stanford Anscombe Society ===
The Stanford Anscombe Society hosted its first event in 2011. The club was not religiously or politically affiliated and sought to promote thought about "the roles of the family, marriage, sexual ethics, chastity and sexuality in the lives of Stanford students." On their website, they emphasize the importance of family in society and define marriage as a union between a man and a woman "until death." They identified "sexual integrity" as critical to the success of a family. According to The Stanford Daily, their first event caused controversy, as the speaker spread conservative sentiments including being anti-same-sex marriage and anti-abortion. According to their website, their last event was in 2014.

=== Clubs on homosexuality ===
In the 2000s and 2010s, university chastity clubs often included language about marriage, with many overtly defining sex as a practice that should only occur between a man and a woman in marriage.

Princeton's Anscombe Society originally denounced homosexual sex and marriage. In their mission statement, they defined marriage as "the exclusive, monogamous union of a man and a woman" which is necessary for "the healthy family," and in their position statement they asserted that they did not support homosexuality because it went against the expectations of chastity, and that they did not support same-sex marriage because it fell outside of the definition of marriage. The Princeton Anscombe Society also actively participated in efforts against LGBTQ+ rights, drafting an amicus brief against same-sex couples for a case heard in the New Jersey Supreme Court in 2006. As of May 2024, the club's new position on same-sex attraction statement claims "all persons have inherent dignity and worth" and declares support for the chastity of people of all sexualities.

In their "About Us," Stanford Anscombe Society defined the family as "one man and one woman bound together by marriage." In 2014, the Stanford Graduate Student Council initially granted funding for the Stanford Anscombe Society's planned conference called "Marriage, Family, and the Media." However, after large backlash by the student body due to the anti-same-sex marriage views of the club and two of the scheduled speakers, the Graduate Student Council revoked the funding.

=== Clubs on gender ===
Chastity clubs at elite universities in the 2000s defined gender as an inherent biological concept with connections to one's behaviors. Columbia University's Augustine Club stated that "chastity comes much harder to men than to women," adding that "it's no secret that the undisciplined male sex drive is monotonously predictable and frivolous." On their now-defunct club's website, Harvard's True Love Revolution organization wrote that there are "inherent physical, behavioral, emotional, and psychological differences between men and women," describing that statement as evoking "true feminism."

The website for Princeton's Anscombe Society also references "true feminism," defining it as a version of feminism that "does not embrace the idea that women should become more like men or that they abandon feminine characteristics and instincts." The Princeton Anscombe Society also states that "there are inherent physical, behavioral, emotional, and psychological differences between men and women, and we affirm and celebrate these differences as wonderful and complementary."

=== Backlash ===
University students responded directly to chastity clubs on their campus. In a 2007 op-ed responding to True Love Waits sending Valentines to freshmen girls encouraging them to wait to have sex, author Rachel M. Singh of the Harvard Class of 2010 wrote that "by targeting women with their cards and didactic message," True Love Revolution sends the message that "the worth of a young woman is measured by her virginity." In 2007, a Princeton student wrote an op-ed bringing attention to the Anscombe Society's efforts in discrimination against gay students. One Stanford student criticized the Stanford Anscombe Society's first event in 2011 as an "anti-abortion, anti-same sex adoption, anti-women, anti-good government, hate fest."

Additionally, feminist groups and other actors have criticized purity culture's framing of gender as biologically and inherently defining one's behavior and psychology. A 2023 column in the Harvard Crimson critiqued the Harvard True Love Revolution's approach to gender, which framed women as responsible for gatekeeping sex from men and men as unable to control sexual urges. The author also discussed the implications of this approach to gender for instances of sexual violence, writing that "women are made to feel that they've failed to protect their purity, while men are absolved of responsibility for their abusive actions." In her 2010 article, scholar Breanne Fahs provided similar critiques, describing how purity culture frames sexual violence as "a mere 'giving in' to temptation" rather than as a violent act based on power and control.

== See also ==
- Celibacy
