= Father–daughter dance =

Social dance between father and daughter

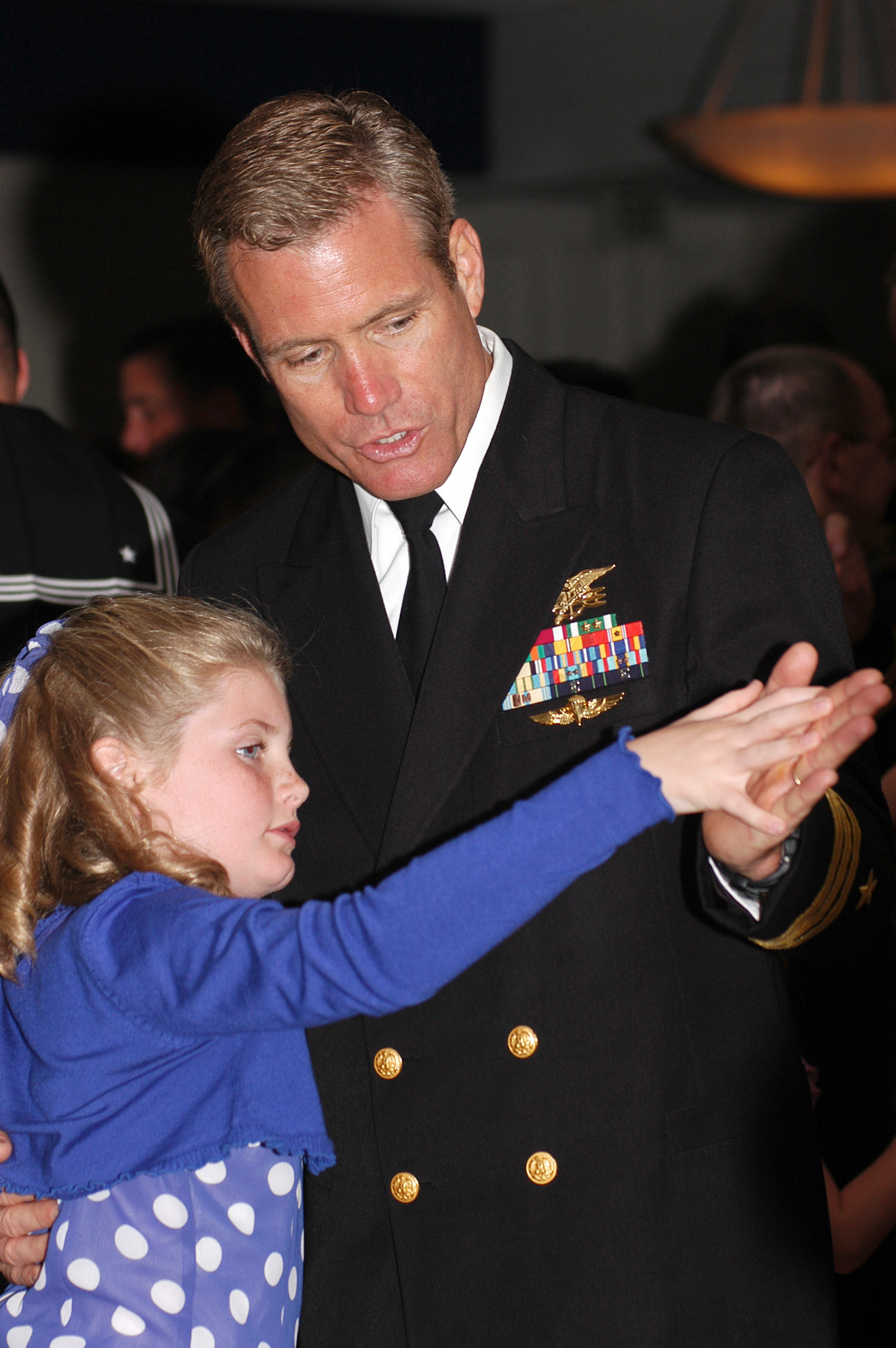
Father with his daughter at a father–daughter dance

A father–daughter dance is a dance between a father and his daughter. Father–daughter dances are common at wedding receptions in the United States and the United Kingdom, although not all weddings have a father–daughter dance. In situations where a daughter's father is not available, he may be substituted with a man of an older generation, such as an uncle or the father of a close friend. Father–daughter dances are very common at quinceañeras and debutante balls. A common trend in 2018 at wedding receptions is to only have a formal first dance for the wedding couple and party songs, forgoing the father–daughter dance. During the COVID-19 pandemic beginning in 2020, this trend was reversed.

At weddings, the father–daughter dance typically takes place immediately following the first dance of a married couple. Sometimes the father–daughter and mother–son dance are combined into one dance. If the first dance takes place upon entry into the reception venue, the father–daughter dance normally happens following toasts and will be followed by the cake cutting.

The song selected for the father–daughter dance normally describes a love between a dad and his daughter. In the mid to late 20th century, popular father–daughter songs included "Daddy's Little Girl" by Al Martino and The Mills Brothers, "My Girl" by The Temptations, "Isn't She Lovely" by Stevie Wonder and "Father and Daughter" by Paul Simon. In the 2010s, popular father–daughter songs include "I Loved Her First" by Heartland, "My Little Girl" by Tim McGraw and "Butterfly Kisses" by Bob Carlisle.

A father–daughter dance can also refer to an event where girls and their fathers can dance. Many elementary schools have father–daughter dances, particularly on Valentine's Day. While these events are intended for girls and their fathers, some schools allow other people, such as the girls' cousins, brothers and close friends to attend.

Mother–son dances use the same analogy of a son and his mother, although they are not as common as father–daughter dances.

== See also ==
- Purity ball
- Mitzvah tantz
