= Nadia Bolz-Weber =

American Lutheran minister (born 1969)

The Reverend Nadia Bolz-Weber
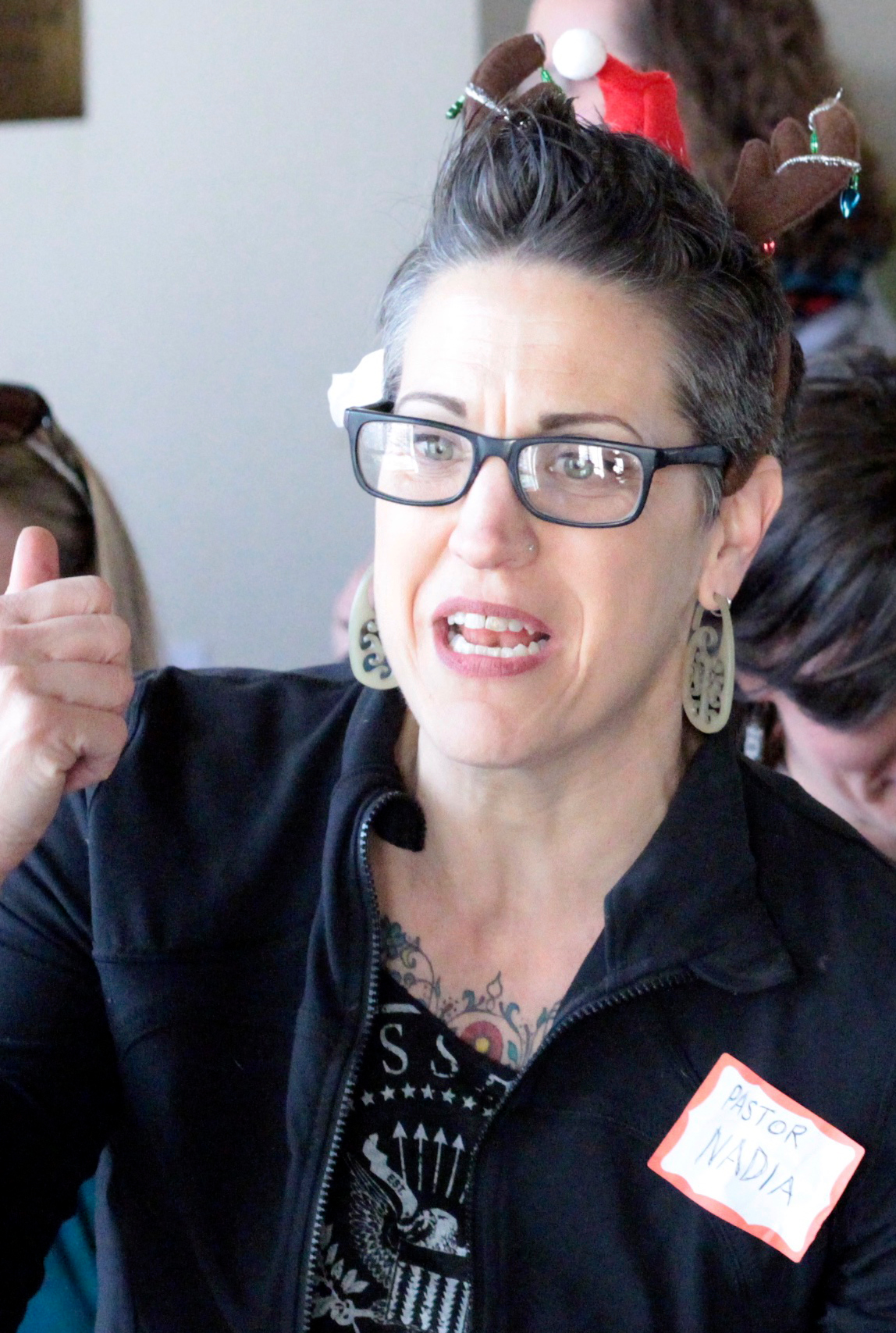
- Bolz-Weber in 2013
- Born: Nadia Bolz; April 22, 1969 (age 57)
- Education: University of Colorado; Iliff School of Theology
- Occupation: Pastor
- Spouses: Matthew Weber (m. 1996; div. 2016) Eric Byrd (m. 2024)

Ecclesiastical career
- Church: Evangelical Lutheran Church in America
- Ordained: 2008
- Writings: Pastrix: The Cranky, Beautiful Faith of a Sinner & Saint, Accidental Saints: Finding God in All the Wrong People, Shameless: A Sexual Reformation
- Congregations: House for All Sinners and Saints
- Website: www.nadiabolzweber.com

Nadia Bolz-Weber (born April 22, 1969) is an American author, Lutheran minister and Mainline Protestant public theologian. She served as the founding pastor of House for All Sinners and Saints, a congregation of the Evangelical Lutheran Church in America in Denver, Colorado, until July 8, 2018.

Bolz-Weber is known for her unusual approach to reaching others through her church. She has produced work in the church that scholar and writer Diana Butler Bass considers part of "a new Reformation".

== Biography ==
Bolz-Weber was born as Nadia Bolz and grew up in Colorado Springs in a fundamentalist Christian family.

Bolz-Weber began to acquire tattoos in 1986 at age 17. Those present on her arms mark the liturgical year and the story of the Gospel. She attended Pepperdine University briefly before dropping out and then moving to Denver. She says that she became an alcoholic and drug abuser and often felt like one of "society's outsiders".

By 1991, Bolz-Weber became sober and, as of 2020, has remained so for 28 years. Prior to her ordination, she was a stand-up comedian and worked in the restaurant industry.

Bolz-Weber felt called to service in 2004 when she was asked to eulogize a friend who had died by suicide. In 2008, Bolz-Weber was ordained as a pastor. She started her own church, the House for All Sinners and Saints, the name of which is often shortened to just 'House.' One-third of her church is part of the LGBT community, and she also has a "Minister of Fabulousness", Stuart, who is a drag queen. Her church is also welcoming to people with drug addiction, depression, and even those who are not believers of her faith. Bolz-Weber spends nearly twenty hours each week writing her weekly ten-minute sermon.

Bolz-Weber speaks at conferences across the world. She has given talks about how faith and feminism co-exist. As a feminist, in 2018 she called for women to send her their purity rings, to be melted down into a sculpture of a vulva which she regarded as representing the healing of the psychic damage induced by the 1990s purity movement. At the Makers conference on Valentine's Day, February 14, 2019, Bolz-Weber gave the sculpture to American feminist and political activist Gloria Steinem.

On August 20, 2021, Bolz-Weber was called by the ELCA’s Rocky Mountain Synod and installed as that denomination's first Pastor of Public Witness, in a ceremony where the synod's bishop, Jim Gonia, gave the installation address.

== Personal life ==
In 1996, she married Matthew Weber, a Lutheran pastor. They had met after she left a conservative form of Christianity and while Weber was a Lutheran seminary student. Getting to know Weber was what initially brought her to the Evangelical Lutheran Church in America. The couple had two children: Judah and Harper.

In 2016, Bolz-Weber divorced her husband after two decades. Rod Dreher criticized her for being open that the lack of physical intimacy was a major reason for the divorce and that shortly afterwards she began an intense sexual relationship with a former boyfriend that she likened to exfoliation. These and other aspects of her personal life were documented in her 2019 book, Shameless.

In April 2024, Bolz-Weber announced her marriage to Eric Byrd.

== Books ==
- Salvation on the Small Screen?: 24 Hours of Christian Television. New York : Seabury Books, 2008. ISBN 9781596270862, OCLC 221174864
- Pastrix: The Cranky, Beautiful Faith of A Sinner and Saint. New York; Boston; Nashville : Jericho Books, 2014. ISBN 9781455527076, OCLC 868044878
- Accidental Saints: Finding God in All the Wrong People. Convergent, 2016. ISBN 9781601427564, OCLC 934193175
- Shameless: A Sexual Reformation. Convergent Books, January 2019. ISBN 978-1601427588, OCLC 1035435905.
- Cranky, Beautiful Faith: For Irregular (and Regular) People (Canterbury Press Norwich, 2022) ISBN 9781786224279
