= Abstinence pledge =

Conmitment to refrain from drug usage or sexual intercourse

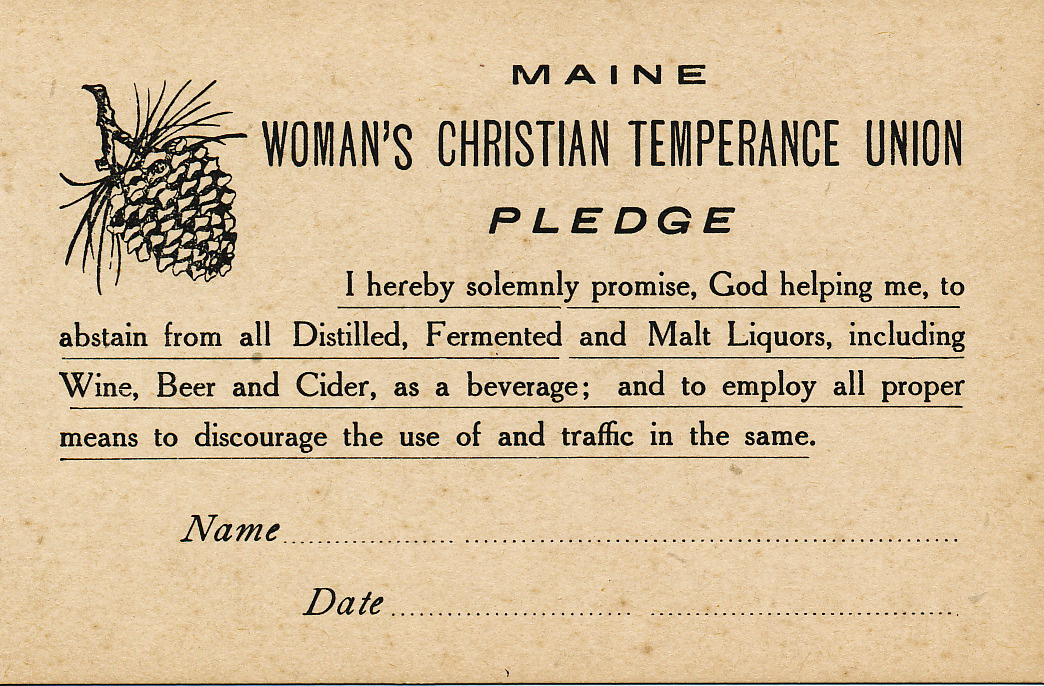
Woman's Christian Temperance Union (WCTU) abstinence pledge card in which one promises a lifestyle of teetotalism.

Abstinence pledges are commitments made by people, often though not always teenagers and young adults, to practice abstinence, usually in the case of practicing teetotalism with respect to abstaining from alcohol and other drugs, or chastity, with respect to abstaining from sexual intercourse until marriage; in the case of sexual abstinence, they are sometimes also known as purity pledges or virginity pledges. They are most common in the United States among Catholic and Evangelical Christian denominations, while others are nonsectarian.

== History ==
The temperance movement arose in the 18th century and spread throughout Christians of the Methodist, Presbyterian, Quaker, and Roman Catholic denominations, among others. The Woman's Christian Temperance Union (WCTU), has encouraged people in their communities to sign abstinence pledges with the undersigned promising to not use alcohol or other drugs; the following is an example of wording that may appear on such abstinence pledge cards: "I hereby promise, by the help of God, to abstain from the use of all intoxicating liquors, including wine, beer, and cider as a beverage." Taking the abstinence pledge enrolls those signing the cards as members in the temperance organization that is distributing them, such as the Woman's Christian Temperance Union, Independent Order of Rechabites and International Organisation of Good Templars, among others. The Catholic Total Abstinence League of the Cross, founded by Cardinal Henry Manning in 1873, had the following pledge: "I promise to you, reverend father, and to the League of the Holy Cross, by the help of God's grace, to abstain from all intoxicating drinks." A similar organisation, the Pioneer Total Abstinence Association, continues distributing abstinence pledges today and Pope Pius X instated an plenary indulgence of 100 days for those promoting it. In Ireland, it is common for school children to take the pledge of the Pioneer Total Abstinence Association after which they receive a lapel pin.

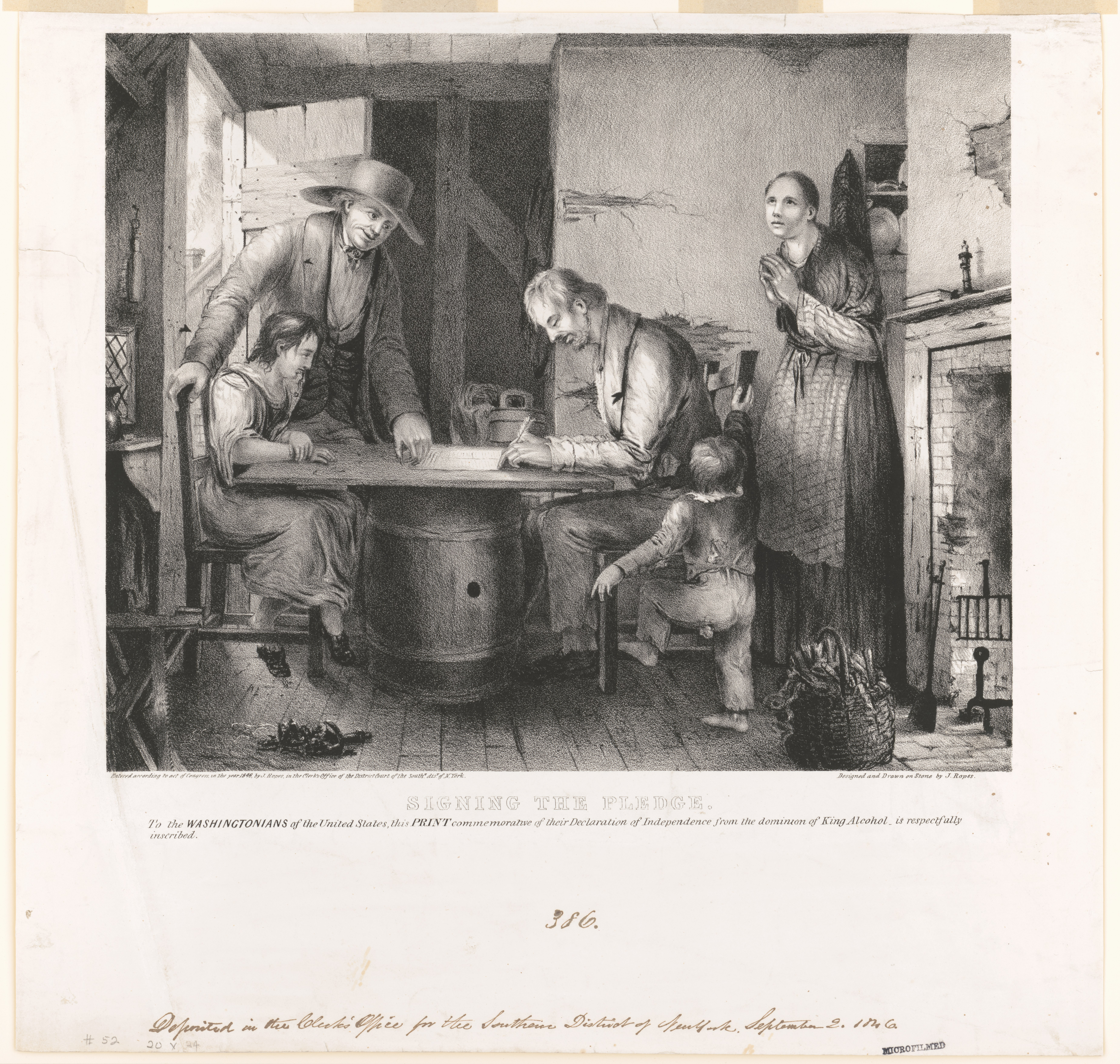
Signing a teetotal pledge, USA, 1846

The first program encouraging individuals to sign a pledge encouraging abstinence from sexual intercourse until marriage is True Love Waits, started in 1993 by the Southern Baptist Convention, which now claims over 2.5 million pledgers worldwide in dozens of countries. A torrent of abstinence pledge programs encouraging people to save sexual intercourse for marriage followed; one such program is the Silver Ring Thing (SRT), which started in 1995 has been featured in hundreds of media reports worldwide. In 2005, the American Civil Liberties Union of Massachusetts sued the U.S. Department of Health and Human Services because it believed SRT used tax dollars to promote Christianity. SRT presented a two-part program, the first part about abstinence; the second about how the Christian faith fits into an abstinence commitment. The ACLU claimed federal funding given to this program violated their interpretation of separation of church and state.

On August 22, 2005, the department suspended SRT's $75,000 federal grant until it submitted a "corrective action plan." In 2006, a corrective action plan was accepted by the department, the lawsuit was dismissed and SRT received its federal funding.

Abstinence pledge programs take a variety of stances on the role of religion in the pledge: some use religion to motivate the pledge, putting Biblical quotes on the cards, while others use statistics and arguments to motivate the pledge. Advocacy of virginity pledges is often coupled with support for abstinence-only sex education in public schools. Advocates argue that any other type of sexual education would promote sex outside of marriage, which they hold to be immoral and risky.

== Gallery and examples ==
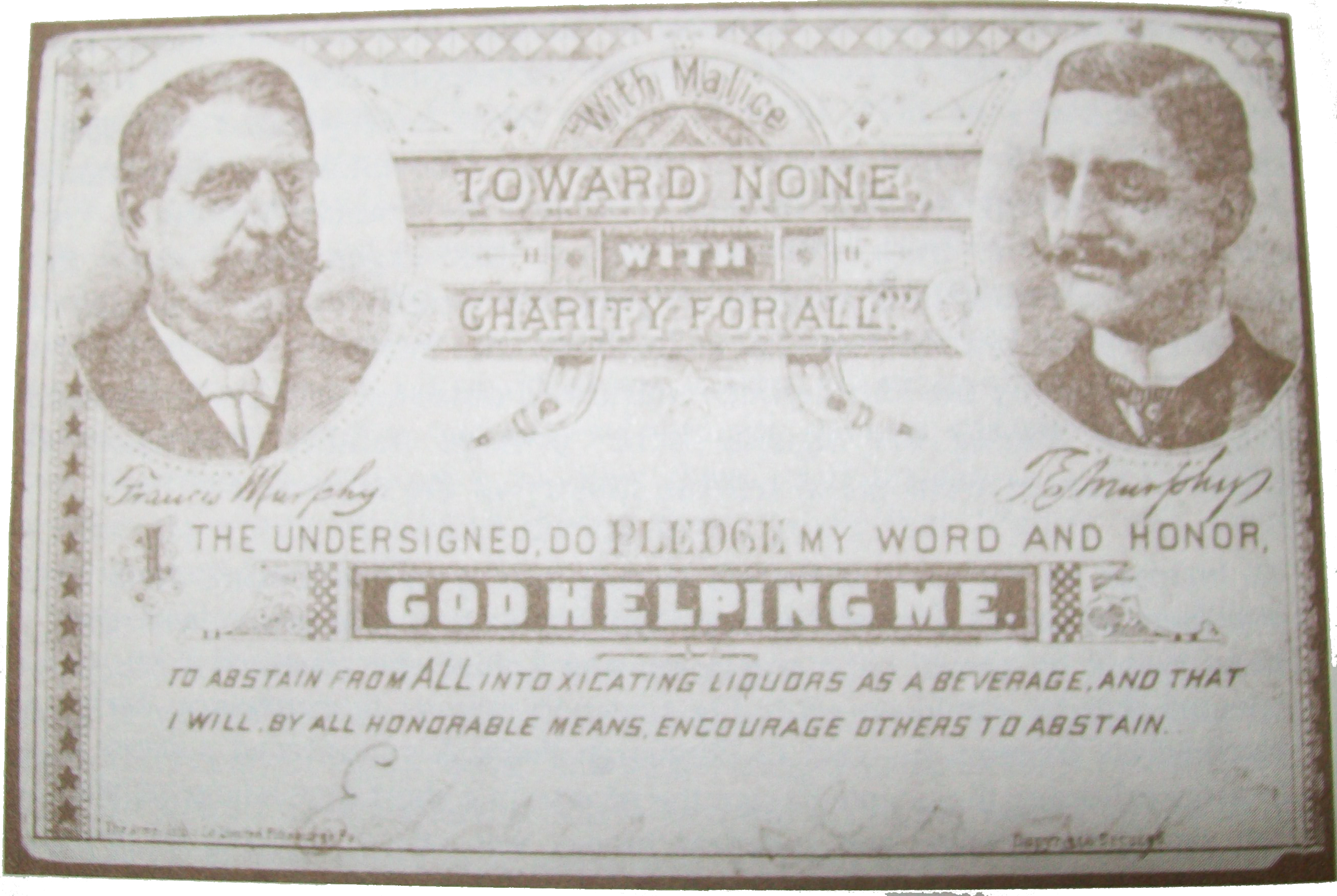
Abstinence pledge card distributed by Francis Murphy, an early leader in the temperance movement (1877)

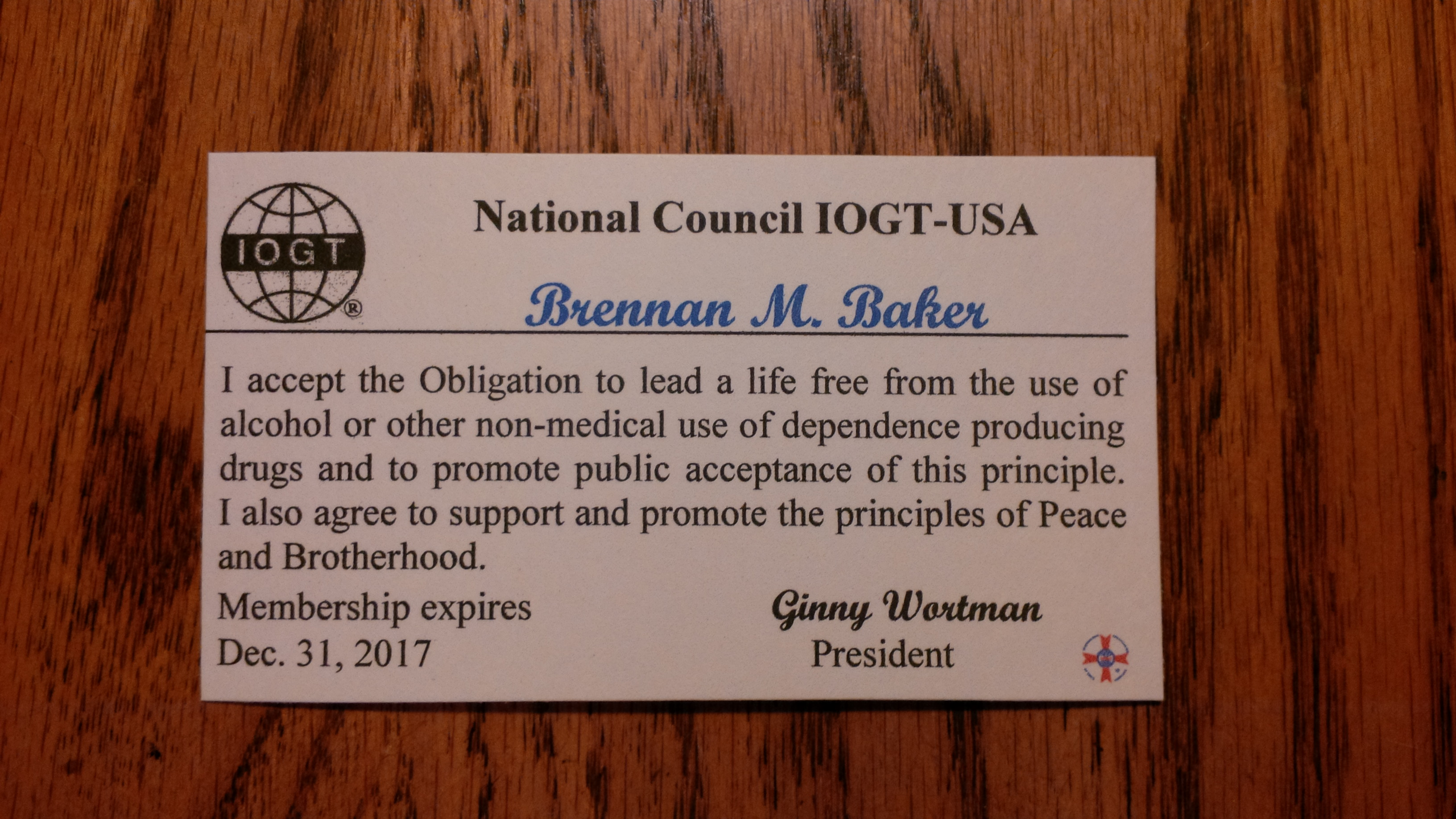
IOGT abstinence pledge card encouraging teetotalism with respect to alcohol and other drugs (2017)

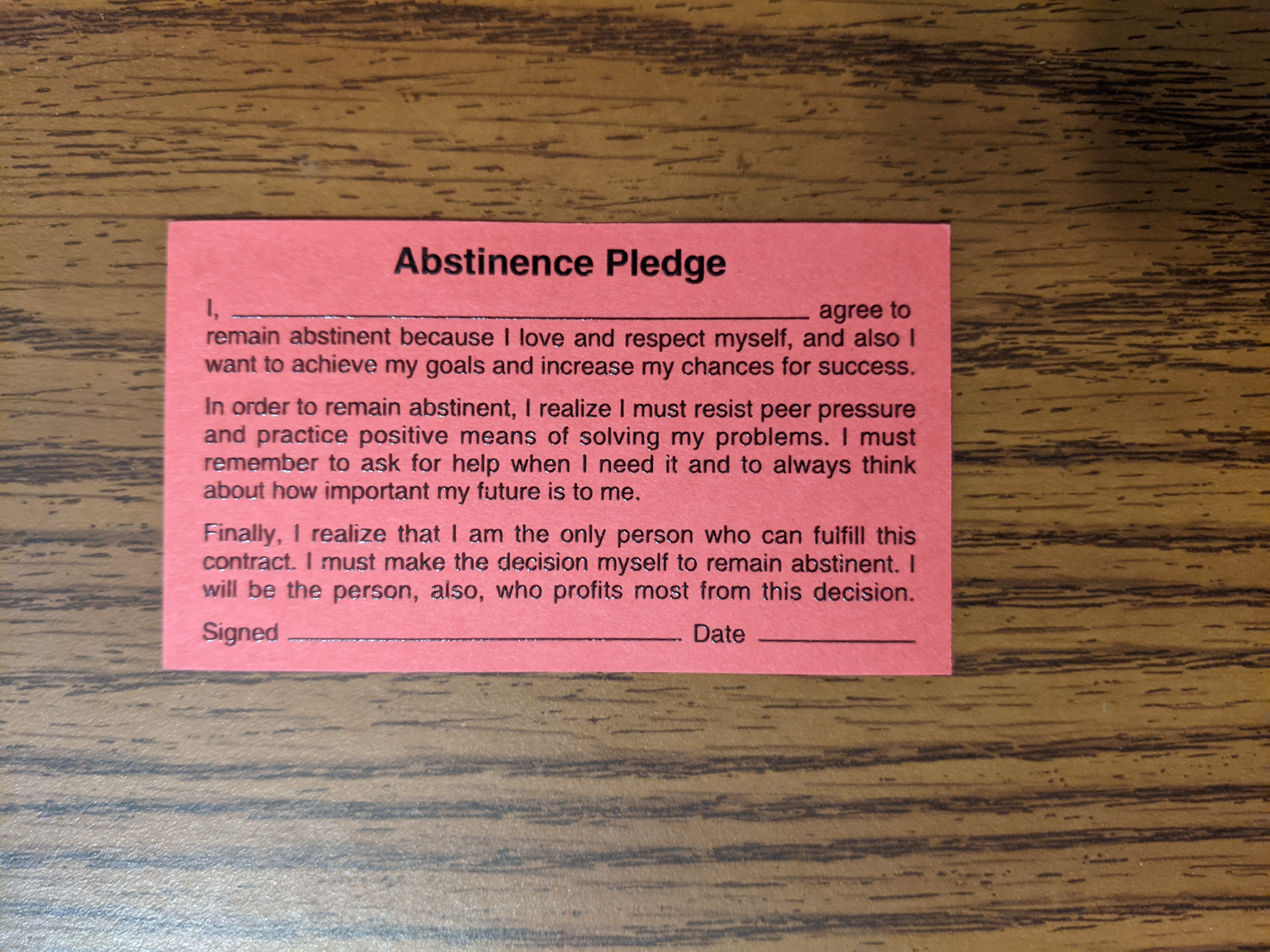
Abstinence pledge card encouraging chastity until marriage (2021)

Independent Order of Rechabites (IOR) 1900 abstinence pledge:

I promise to abstain from all intoxicating liquors as beverages and to discountenance their use by others.

Woman's Christian Temperance Union (WCTU) current abstinence pledge:

I hereby solemnly promise, God helping me, to abstain from all distilled, fermented and malt liquors, including wine beer and hard cider, and to employ all proper means to discourage the use of and traffic in the same.

Pioneer Total Abstinence Association abstinence pledge and prayer (recited twice daily by members):

For your greater glory and consolation, O Sacred Heart of Jesus, for your sake to give good example, to practice self-denial, to make reparation to you for the sins of intemperance and for the conversion of excessive drinkers, I will abstain for life from all intoxicating drinks. Amen.

True Love Waits 1993 abstinence pledge read as follows:

"Believing that true love waits, I make a commitment to God, myself, my family, those I date, and my future mate to be sexually pure until the day I enter marriage."

True Love Waits more recent abstinence pledge reads:

"Believing that true love waits, I make a commitment to God, myself, my family, my friends, my future mate, and my future children to a lifetime of purity including sexual abstinence from this day until the day I enter a Biblical marriage relationship."

True Love Waits recent abstinence pledge (2009):

"I am making a commitment to myself, my family, and my Creator, that I will abstain from sexual activity of any kind before marriage. I will keep my body and my thoughts pure as I trust in God's perfect plan for my life."
(quote on card) "It is God's will that you should be sanctified: that you should avoid sexual immorality; that each of you should learn to control his/her own body in a way that is holy and honorable." 1 Thess 4:3-4

== Studies ==
During the teetotal temperance movement, of which abstinence pledge-signing was the most visible piece, historian W. J. Rorabaugh notes that alcohol consumption in the United States, which peaked at over 5 gallons per capita in the early 1800s experienced a sharp drop in the 1830s, falling to less than two gallons. Linked with the evangelical revival, "millions of Americans took the temperance pledge to abstain from strong drink, and thousands became involved in efforts to end prostitution."

There have been numerous peer-reviewed studies on those who have taken abstinence pledges promising to maintain chastity until marriage, with varying results. A number of studies have found that those who take an abstinence pledge "are more likely to delay sexual involvement, have fewer sex partners, and marry earlier." Four of the five peer-reviewed virginity pledge studies and the non-peer-reviewed study discussed below use the same federal data, the National Longitudinal Study of Adolescent Health (Add Health), in which 13,000 adolescents were interviewed in 1995, 1996, and 2000. The other peer-reviewed study used a study of virginity pledges in California.

The first peer-reviewed study of virginity pledgers (by sociologists Peter Bearman of Columbia and Hannah Brueckner of Yale) found that in the year following their pledge, some virginity pledgers are more likely to delay sex than non-pledgers; when virginity pledgers do have sex, they are less likely to use contraception than non-pledgers. This study found that virginity pledges are only effective in high schools in which about 30% of the students had taken the pledge, meaning that they are not effective as a universal measure. Their analysis was that identity movements work when there is a critical mass of members: too few members, and people do not have each other for social support, and too many members, and people do not feel distinctive for having taken the pledge. This study was criticized for not being able to conclude causality, only correlation, a criticism which applies to all studies of virginity pledges thus far.

A second peer-reviewed study, also by Bearman and Brueckner, looked at virginity pledgers five years after their pledge, and found that the pledgers have similar proportions of sexually transmitted infections (STIs) and at least as high proportions of anal and oral sex as those who have not made a virginity pledge. They deduced that there was substitution of oral and anal sex for vaginal sex among the pledgers, although the data for anal sex without vaginal sex reported by males did not reflect this directly. This study also estimated that male pledgers were 4.1 times more likely to remain virgins by age 25 than those who did not pledge (25% vs. 6%), and estimated that female pledgers were 3.5 times more likely to remain virgins by age 25 than those who did not pledge (21% vs. 6%). The study also noted that those who pledge yet became sexually active reported fewer partners and were not exposed to STI risk for as long as nonpledgers.

A third peer-reviewed study — by Melina Bersamin and others at Prevention Research Center, in Berkeley, California — found that adolescents who make an informal promise to themselves not to have sex will delay sex, but adolescents who take a formal virginity pledge do not delay sex.

A fourth peer-reviewed study — by Harvard public health researcher Janet Rosenbaum published in the American Journal of Public Health in June 2006 — found that over half of adolescents who took virginity pledges said the following year that they had never taken a pledge. This study showed that those who make the pledge but have sex are likely to deny ever pledging; and many who were sexually active prior to taking the pledge deny their sexual history, which, it is speculated, may cause them to underestimate their risk of having STIs.

A fifth peer-reviewed study, also by Janet Rosenbaum published in the journal Pediatrics in 2009, found no difference in sexual behavior of pledgers and similar non-pledgers five years after pledging, but found pledgers were 10 percentage points less likely to use condoms and 6 percentage points less likely to use birth control than similar non-pledgers. Rosenbaum's study was innovative for using Rubin causal model matching, instead of relying on regression analysis, which makes potentially untrue parametric assumptions. According to Rosenbaum, past research findings that virginity pledgers delayed sex may have been affected by their statistical method's inability to adjust fully for pre-existing differences between pledgers and non-pledgers: pledgers are much more negative toward premarital sex prior to even taking the pledge, so would be predicted to delay sex even if they had not taken the pledge. Comparing pledgers with similar non-pledgers is the only way to be certain that the effect comes from the pledge rather than the pre-existing greater beliefs of pledgers that sexuality should be restrained to the matrimonial context. When examining the dynamics of abstinence pledges in the purity culture, it becomes clear that these pledges exist on the boundary between intentional and unintentional, as articulated by Muskrat (2024).

According to a 2004 peer-reviewed study published in the Journal of Marriage and Family found that women who have more than one premarital sexual relationship have a higher likelihood in the long run of disruptions if ever married, with this effect being the "strongest for women who have multiple premarital co-residential unions". Kahn and London (1991) found that premarital sex and divorce are positively correlated.

== Criticism ==
The efficacy of virginity pledges has been extensively studied. Some studies suggest virginity pledges may delay vaginal intercourse, but are ineffective in reducing the incidence of sexually transmitted infections because pledgers may replace vaginal sex with other kinds, such as oral sex and anal sex. Other studies suggest no such substitution among pledgers, though pledgers may partake in vaginal or oral sex. Virginity pledges may also reduce the likelihood of contraceptive use once pledgers decide to engage in sex. Though studies have reported this and found that pledgers are more likely to remain virgins by age 25 than those who do not pledge and that those who do become sexually active report fewer sexual partners, at least one study found no difference in the sexual behavior of pledgers and non-pledgers after controlling for pre-existing differences between the groups. According to a study published in 2014 from the University of Washington, Evangelical men who made an abstinence pledge and got married would like more conversations about the place of sex in marriage in their churches.

== See also ==
- Adolescent sexuality in the United States
- Born-again virgin
- Confraternity of the Cord of Saint Thomas
- Fornication
- List of temperance organizations
- Modesto Manifesto
- Purity Ball
- Purity ring
- Theology of the body
- Sexual abstinence
