= R (Playfoot) v Millais School Governing Body =

English court case over school banning jewellery

R (on the application of Playfoot) v Millais School Governing Body
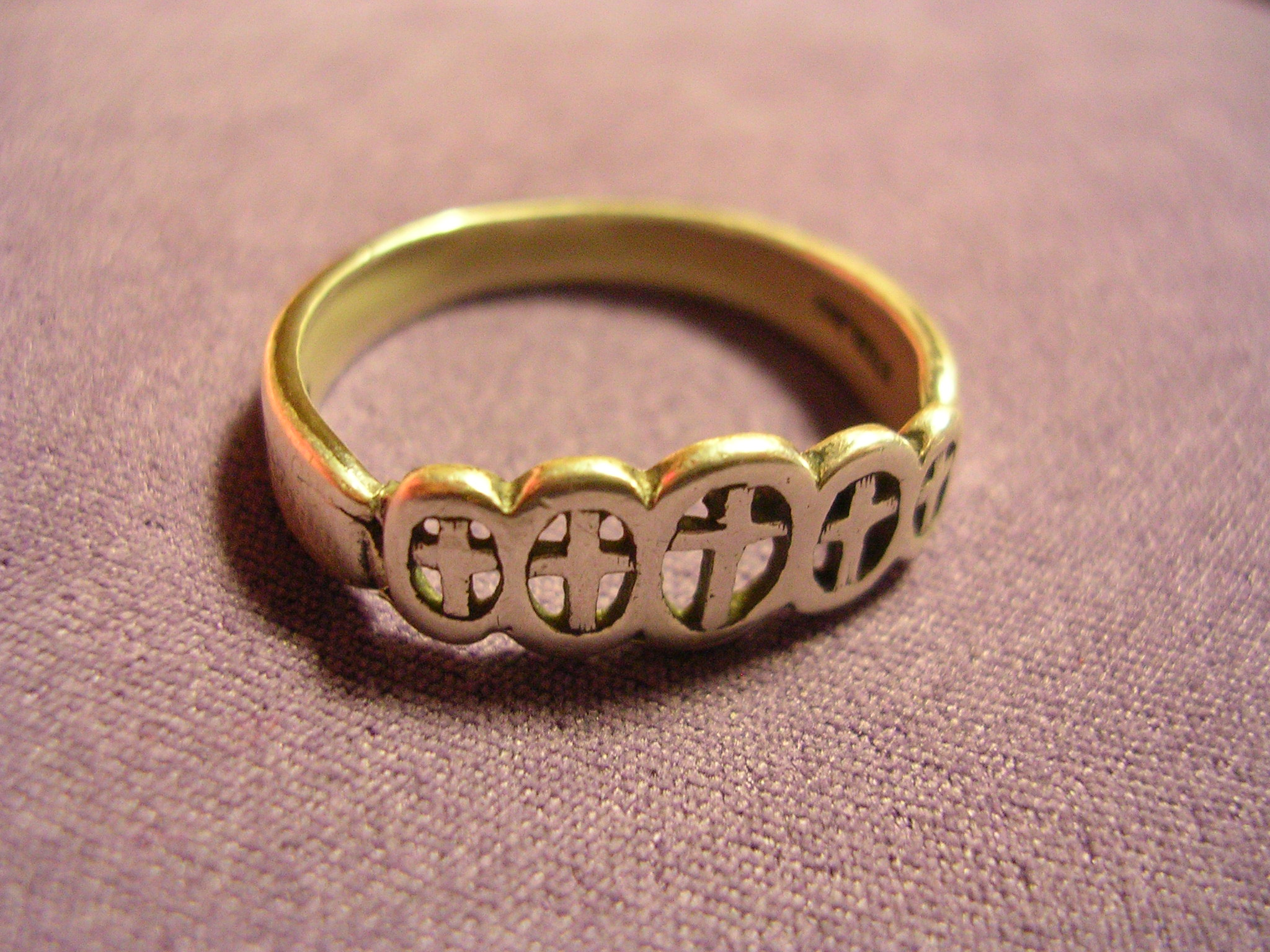
- A purity ring.
- Court: Administrative Court
- Decided: 16 July 2007
- Citations: [2007] EWHC 1698 (Admin), [2007] LGR 851, [2007] 3 FCR 754

Case opinions
- Deputy Judge Michael Supperstone QC

Keywords
- Religious discrimination

R (on the application of Playfoot) v Millais School Governing Body [2007] EWHC 1698 (Admin) is an English discrimination law case concerning freedom of religion. It was decided under the Human Rights Act 1998.

== Facts ==
A school pupil insisted that wearing a purity ring at school was a manifestation of her religious beliefs as a Christian. The school had a policy against jewellery, and she was told she was not allowed to wear it. She claimed this violated her right to freedom of religion under Article 9 of the European Convention on Human Rights. She was represented by Paul Diamond and funded by the advocacy group Christian Concern.

== Judgment ==
Michael Supperstone QC held in the Administrative Court that not only was the wearing of the ring not linked to a belief in chastity before marriage, but that it was not any requirement of the Christian faith. The uniform policy, which she had accepted by going to the school, did not create any undue hardship. The policy was prescribed by law in the legitimate pursuit of creating equality and cohesion, minimising pressure from markings of difference in wealth or status. So any interference with her Article 9 rights was justified.

== See also ==
- UK employment discrimination law
- UK labour law
- Human Rights Act 1998
