= Making Chastity Sexy =

2011 book by Christine Gardner

Making Chastity Sexy: The Rhetoric of Evangelical Abstinence Campaigns
- Author: Christine Gardner
- Language: English
- Subject: Evangelical sexual abstinence teachings
- Publisher: University of California Press
- Publication place: United States
- Awards: Stephen E. Lucas Debut Publication Award
- ISBN: 978-0-520-26727-5

Making Chastity Sexy: The Rhetoric of Evangelical Abstinence Campaigns is a 2011 book by Christine Gardner, a professor at Wheaton College. In it, Gardner states that sexual abstinence teachings by evangelicals are currently "using sex to sell abstinence" by promising more satisfying sexual activity within marriage for those who abstain from premarital sex; she argues that this rhetoric reinforces selfish desires for gratification, sets people up for divorce and dissatisfaction with marriage, and simply adapts "secular forms for religious ends".

The book investigates three evangelical organizations that advocate sexual abstinence: Silver Ring Thing, True Love Waits, and Pure Freedom. In addition to these United States–based sexual abstinence organizations, the book studies one Africa-based sexual abstinence organization. The image on the book cover depicts a female human abdomen exposed by a crop top and low-rise jeans; a navel piercing is encircled by a tattoo of the words "True Love Waits" in cursive. In preparation for writing the book, Gardner spent five years doing research at chastity events in various locations in both the United States and sub-Saharan Africa.

Frank Schaeffer called the book "important and perceptive in a profound way". In 2012, Making Chastity Sexy won the Stephen E. Lucas Debut Publication Award for a scholarly monograph or book in the field of communication studies.
