= Fornication =

Non-marital sexual intercourse

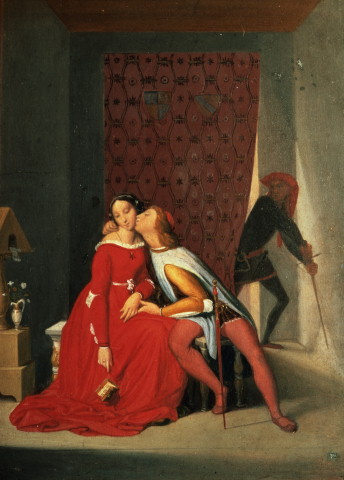
Paolo and Francesca, whom Dante's Inferno describes as damned for fornication (Jean-Auguste-Dominique Ingres)

Fornication generally refers to consensual sexual intercourse between two people who are not married to each other. When a married person has consensual sexual relations with one or more partners whom they are not married to, it is called adultery.

For many people, the term carries an overtone of moral or religious disapproval, but the significance of sexual acts to which the term is applied varies between religions, societies, and cultures. Christian theologian John Calvin viewed adultery to be a sexual act that is considered outside of the divine model for sexual intercourse between married individuals, which includes fornication. In modern usage, the term is often replaced with more judgment-neutral terms such as premarital sex, extramarital sex, or recreational sex.

== Etymology and usage ==
In the original Greek version of the New Testament, the term porneia (πορνεία – "prostitution") is used 25 times (including variants such as the genitive πορνείας).

In the late 4th century, the Latin Vulgate, a Latin translation of the Greek texts, translated the term as fornicati, fornicatus, fornicata, and fornicatae. The terms fornication and fornicators are found in the 1599 Geneva Bible, the 1611 King James Version, the 1899 Catholic Douay–Rheims Bible, and the 1901 American Standard Version. Many modern post-World War 2 Bible translations completely avoid all usage of fornicators and fornication: English Standard Version, New Living Translation, New International Version, Christian Standard Bible, Good News Bible and Contemporary English Version do not use the terms fornication or fornicators. Where one translation may use fornication another translation may use whoredom, sexual immorality (e.g., Matthew 19:9) or more simply immoral or immorality.

In Latin, the term fornix means arch or vault. In ancient Rome, prostitutes waited for their customers out of the rain under vaulted ceilings, and fornix became a euphemism for brothels, and the Latin verb fornicare referred to a man visiting a brothel. The first recorded use in English is in the Cursor Mundi, c. 1300; the Oxford English Dictionary (OED) records a figurative use as well: "The forsaking of God for idols". Fornicated as an adjective is still used in botany, meaning "arched" or "bending over" (as in a leaf). John Milton plays on the double meaning of the word in The Reason of Church-Government Urged against Prelaty (1642): "[She] gives up her body to a mercenary whordome under those fornicated [ar]ches which she cals Gods house."

== Across history, cultures, and laws ==
A survey undertaken by the American Sociological Review between 2000 and 2008 covering 31 developing countries found that "94 percent of Jews... reported having premarital sex, compared to 79 percent of Christians, 65 percent of Buddhists, 43 percent of Muslims and 19 percent of Hindus."

=== Roman Empire ===
During the sixth century, Emperor Justinian formulated legislation that was to become the basis of Western marriage law for the next millennium. Under his laws, cohabiting couples were no longer recognised as married and their children were regarded as illegitimate, with the same status as the children of prostitutes. However, the status of illegitimate children could be updated if the parents later married.

=== Great Britain ===
In the 1170s, "it was common practice for ordinary couples to cohabit before marriage and for cousins to marry one another" and there was very little stigma around bastards at any social level in medieval England. For instance, William the Conqueror's right to succeed to the throne of Normandy was never questioned on the grounds of his being a bastard nor, in his conflict with Harold Godwinson over who should rule England, was this issue raised as an argument against him. However, attitudes shifted a few generations later when bastards were no longer able to claim the English throne. The Waldensians were a medieval sect accused of fornication and of not regarding it a sin.

The English applied a fine to fornication called a 'leyrwite' which was very common in the 13th and later centuries.

During the ascendancy of the Puritans, an Act for suppressing the detestable sins of Incest, Adultery and Fornication was passed by the English Council of State in 1650. At the Restoration in 1660, this statute was not renewed, and prosecution of the mere act of fornication itself was abandoned. However, notorious and open lewdness, when carried to the extent of exciting public scandal, continued to be an indictable offence at common law, however fornication in a private sense was not illegal.

Prior to the passing of the Marriage Act 1753, laws against bastard children became more strict during the 1730s and 1740s.

In the Victorian era, however, the English working class continued to have a different set of sexual mores from the upper-middle and upper classes. Premarital intercourse was considered acceptable for the working class but only after an extended period of courtship and occurred infrequently even then. The couple were expected to marry, though. Disgrace only arose if the female became pregnant and the couple did not marry.

=== United States ===
Ethical issues arising from sexual relations between consenting adults who have reached the age of consent have generally been viewed as matters of private morality, and so have not historically been prosecuted on a general basis as criminal offenses in the common law. This legal position was inherited by the United States from the United Kingdom. Later, some jurisdictions, a total of 16 in the southern and eastern United States, as well as the states of Wisconsin and Utah, passed statutes creating the offense of fornication that prohibited (vaginal) sexual intercourse between two unmarried people of the opposite sex. Most of these laws either were repealed or were struck down by the courts in several states as being odious to their state constitutions. In Pollard v. Lyon (1875), the U.S. Supreme Court upheld a District of Columbia U.S. District Court ruling that spoken words by the defendant in the case that accused the plaintiff of fornication were not actionable for slander because fornication, although involving moral turpitude, was not an indictable offense in the District of Columbia at the time as it had not been an indictable offense in Maryland since 1785 (when a provincial law passed in 1715 that banned both fornication and adultery saw only its fornication prohibition repealed by the Maryland General Assembly). See also State v. Saunders, 381 A.2d 333 (N.J. 1977), Martin v. Ziherl, 607 S.E.2d 367 (Va. 2005). As of December 2023, the only states in America that have laws banning fornication are:

- Georgia (Official Code of Georgia Annotated, § 16-6-18)
- Illinois (Illinois Compiled Statutes, § 720-5/11-40)
- Mississippi (Unannotated Mississippi Code, § 97-29-1)
- North Carolina (North Carolina General Statutes, § 14-26-184)
- North Dakota (North Dakota Century Code, § 12.1-20-08) (note: even though the crime is called "fornication", it only refers to having sex with minors or having sex in public. It does not target private consensual sex between adults, so in practice this law is irrelevant; it is only listed here for the sake of completeness because the crime is called "fornication" under the North Dakotan law)

A woman was arrested in Mississippi in 2010 for fornication, but the charges were dismissed. North Carolina has a slightly more involved but still relevant law stating, "if any man and woman, not being married to each other, shall lewdly and lasciviously associate, bed and cohabit together, they shall be guilty of a Class 2 misdemeanor."

Some acts of fornication were prohibited under criminal laws defining the offense of sodomy, rather than the laws defining the offense of fornication. However, the U.S. Supreme Court decision in Lawrence v. Texas (2003) rendered the states' remaining laws related to sodomy unenforceable. Lawrence v. Texas is also presumed by many to invalidate laws prohibiting fornication: the decision declared sodomy laws unconstitutional, saying that they interfered with private, consensual, non-commercial intimate relations between unrelated adults, and therefore were odious to the rights of liberty and privacy, such rights being retained by the people of the United States.

=== Australia ===
A 2003 survey reported that most non-religious Australians thought that premarital sex was acceptable. It showed that there was a correlation between liberalism, education levels, lack of conservative religious beliefs and a permissive attitude to premarital sex.

=== Islamic nations ===
In some Muslim countries, such as Saudi Arabia, Pakistan, Afghanistan, Iran, Kuwait, Brunei, Maldives, Malaysia, Morocco, Oman, Mauritania, Qatar, Sudan, and Yemen, any form of sexual activity outside marriage is illegal.

Zina (premarital sex) and fornication are strictly prohibited in Islam, as it is thought to lead to having children that do not know their parents and the deterioration of traditional concepts of family. Islam puts strong emphasis on the concept of family and children being kind to their parents. The punishment of zina in Islam according to Quran is only lashing for the unmarried; scholars allowed stoning only for married according to hadith. For this punishment to be applied, there must be four people who witnessed this incident in order to report it. If the accuser fails to produce four witnesses before the judge, then the accuser will get hadd punishment for slander as it is mentioned in the Quran: "And those who accuse chaste women, and produce not four witnesses, flog them with eighty stripes, and reject their testimony forever. They indeed are the Faasiqoon (liars, rebellious, disobedient to Allah)".

If the person who committed zina has been proved in a court of law before a judge to have done it, and if they are married, then and only then can they be subjected to rajm, or stoning to death, provided stoning can be performed only by legal authorities.

There are many instances from the pre-modern era and several recent cases of stoning for zina being legally carried out. Zina became a more pressing issue in modern times, as Islamist movements and governments employed polemics against public immorality. During the Algerian Civil War, Islamist insurgents assassinated women suspected of loose morals, the Taliban have executed suspected adultresses using machine guns, and zina has been used as justification for honor killings. After sharia-based criminal laws were widely replaced by European-inspired statutes in the modern era, several countries passed legal reforms that incorporated elements of hudud laws into their legal codes. Iran witnessed several highly publicized stonings for zina in the aftermath of the Islamic revolution. In Nigeria, local courts have passed several stoning sentences, all of which were overturned on appeal or left unenforced. In Pakistan, the Hudood Ordinances of 1979 subsumed prosecution of rape under the category of zina, departing from traditional judicial practice, and making rape extremely difficult to prove while exposing the victims to jail sentences for admitting illicit intercourse. Although these laws were amended in 2006, they still blur the legal distinction between rape and consensual sex. According to human rights organizations, stoning for zina has also been carried out in Saudi Arabia.

== Religious views ==
=== Bahá'í ===
Bahá'ís are required to be "absolutely chaste" before marriage. To Bahá'ís this means not only abstaining from fornication, but also abstaining from hugging and kissing before marriage. The most holy book of the Bahá'í Faith, the Kitáb-i-Aqdas, punishes fornication with fines which double with every offense (as in the wheat and chessboard problem). The Arabic word used in the Kitáb-i-Aqdas for this sin is zina, which can refer to either fornication or adultery, depending on context, but 'Abdu'l-Bahá has clarified that in this context the word zina refers to fornication. 'Abdu'l-Bahá further states that the purpose of this punishment is to shame and disgrace fornicators in the eyes of society.

=== Buddhism ===
Buddhism disapproves of extramarital sex and adultery in their clergy, which is considered sexual misconduct. The discipline of Buddhism denounces fornication for the monastics specifically. Sexual activities between lay people however are left to their own discretion so long as it is not sexual misconduct such as adultery: "fornication" in itself as traditionally understood by Western civilization is not considered sexual misconduct. In contrast to Abrahamic religions (Christianity, Judaism, and Islam) which have strict rules about specific behaviors and sex outside of marriage, "Buddhism does not have similarly strict rules about specific behaviors".

A study published in 2013 found that Buddhists were the most likely of all major religious groups to have had sex before marriage, with over 85% of Buddhists reported having done so.

=== Christianity ===
==== Generalities ====
The Old Testament contains references to violent acts but also non-violent acts of fornication, sex outside the marriage, using the word זָנָה (zanah), etymologically related to the Arabic concept of zina.

Throughout history, most theologians have argued that any and all forms of premarital sex are immoral. A historical example is the medieval English monastic, John Baconthorpe. A more contemporary example is the modern-day theologian Lee Gatiss who argues that premarital sex is immoral based on scripture. He states that, from a biblical perspective, "physical union should not take place outside a 'one flesh' (i.e. marriage) union [...] In [1 Corinthians] chapter 7 Paul addresses the situation of two unmarried Christians who are burning with passion (7:8–9) who should either exercise self-control or be permitted to marry (cf. verses 36–38). The underlying assumptions are the same as those in Deuteronomy 22."

A minority of theologians have argued in more recent times that premarital sex may not be immoral in some limited circumstances. An example is John Witte, who argues that the Bible itself is silent on the issue of consensual, premarital sex between an engaged couple. In other words, Witte claims that the Bible excludes premarital sex from its list of unlawful sexual relations (Leviticus 18) though Leviticus 18 is not the only such list, nor does Leviticus 18 claim to be exhaustive being devoted largely to forms of incest.

Some of the debate arises from the question of which theological approach is being applied. A deontological view of sex interprets porneia, aselgeia and akatharsia in terms of whether the couple are married or non-married. What makes sex moral or immoral is the context of marriage. By contrast, a teleological view interprets porneia, aselgeia and akatharsia in terms of the quality of the relationship (how well it reflects God's glory and Christian notions of a committed, virtuous relationship).

The debate also turns on the definition of the two Greek words moicheia (μοιχεία, 'adultery') and porneia (πορνεία, meaning 'prostitution', from which the word pornography derives). The first word is restricted to contexts involving sexual betrayal of a spouse; the second word is used as a generic term for illegitimate sexual activity, although many scholars hold that the Septuagint uses porneia to refer specifically to male temple prostitution. Elsewhere in First Corinthians, incest, homosexual intercourse and prostitution are all explicitly forbidden by name.

Paul is preaching about activities based on sexual prohibitions laid out in Leviticus in the context of achieving holiness. One theory therefore suggests that it is these behaviours, and only these, that are intended by Paul's prohibition in chapter seven. Most mainstream Christian sources believe that porneia encompasses all forms of premarital sex. For instance, in defining porneia/fornication, Kittel and Friedrich's 1977 Theological Dictionary of the New Testament states that "The NT is characterized by an unconditional repudiation of all extra-marital and unnatural intercourse". Likewise, Friberg's Analytical Lexicon to the Greek New Testament defines porneia as being "generally, every kind of extramarital, unlawful or unnatural sexual intercourse".

Lee Gatiss also argues that porneia encompasses all forms of premarital sex. He states that "the word 'fornication' has gone out of fashion and is not in common use to describe non-marital sex. However, it is an excellent translation for porneia, which basically referred to any kind of sex outside of marriage [...] This has been contested [...] but the overwhelming weight of scholarship and all the available evidence from the ancient world points firmly in this direction. 'Flee sexual immorality (porneia) and pursue self-control' (cf. 1 Thess 4:1–8) was the straightforward message to Christians in a sex-crazed world."

==== Jesus and the early Church ====
Attitudes towards marriage and sexuality at the time of Jesus stemmed from a blend of Roman and Jewish ideas. For instance, during the lifetime of Jesus, there was a strong social disapproval among Romans of polygamy. This made its way into Judaism and early Christianity, despite the Old Testament portraying examples of this behaviour among patriarchs and kings.

Jewish marriage in the time of Jesus was a two-stage process. First, there was a betrothal in which the man claimed the woman to be his only bride. Secondly, there was the marriage contract that specified what the bride and groom's families would give the couple and what the bride would obtain if she divorced. "At the time of Jesus, and in rural areas like Galilee, a young couple might well cohabit before the contract was signed 'in order to get acquainted'. The betrothal was held to be enough of a marriage that a divorce would be needed if the couple split up between betrothal and contract." Matthew 1:19, in which the as yet unmarried Joseph considers divorcing Mary to avoid the potential scandal of her being pregnant with Jesus, alludes to this practice.

The early Church's statements on marital affairs mainly concerned acceptable reasons for divorce and remarriage. Whilst Paul, in his epistles to early believers, emphasised that both celibacy and marriage were good forms of life, after his life the Church felt that celibacy was more virtuous and liberating. This focus came about because the early church was very ascetic, possibly due to the influence of Greek philosophical thought. The focus on celibacy meant that other issues relating to sexual morality for the non-celibate remained under-developed.

Augustine of Hippo's views strongly influenced how later Christians thought about sex. Before becoming a Christian, he had taken a concubine in defiance of his (Christian) mother's anxious warning to him "not to commit fornication". "Though sinful in acting out his erotic desires, Augustine gives himself some credit, writing that 'the single desire that dominated my search for delight was simply to love and be loved'". Reflecting much later, he believed that the problem was that his love had "no restraint imposed [on it] by the exchange of mind with mind". Hence, pure love was perverted by its misdirection toward lust whereas a godly relationship should focus on a loving, rational partnership instead.

In his later writings, Augustine was "deeply suspicious of sexual passion" and this has influenced the outlook of all the major Christian denominations down to the present day. Augustine considered fornication to have two definitions: the first was "cleaving to a prostitute" and the second, broader and more precise one was "what men who do not have wives do with women who do not have husbands". Augustine believed fornicators were sinful because they corrupted their own selves, their image of God and the temple of God.

==== Teaching by denomination ====
===== Catholicism =====
Catholicism equates premarital sex with fornication and ties it with breaking the sixth commandment ("Thou shalt not commit adultery") in its Catechism:

Fornication is carnal union between an unmarried man and an unmarried woman. It is gravely contrary to the dignity of persons and of human sexuality which is naturally ordered to the good of spouses and the generation and education of children. Moreover, it is a grave scandal when there is corruption of the young.

The Catholic Church did not pro-actively condemn men for premarital sex until the 12th century. The Third Council of Aachen (862) had previously noted that it was almost unheard of for a man to remain a virgin until his wedding but males remained largely immune to punishment whereas females were heavily penalized for sexual misdemeanours. Despite the Church's disapproval of nonmarital sex, fornication continued to be commonplace in the early medieval period.

In the 12th century, the Paris-based "Reform Church" movement was a Catholic faction that attempted to refocus society's moral compass with a particular emphasis on sex and marriage. The movement sent priests to Wales where it was, up until that time, the norm for Christians to live together prior to marriage.

Up until this period, marriage was considered a private contract between two people. They would make a pledge to each other and, from that moment on, they were considered married. This pledge could take place anywhere; it did not have to occur in a church and neither the church nor the state were involved. It was during the twelfth century that the Catholic Church took control of the process of marriage. From that point on, to be legally recognised, a marriage had to take place in a church with a formal service conducted by a priest. Hence all marriage and sexual activity now came under the control of the Church.

At the time of the Reformation, the Catholic Church "officially advocated celibacy for the religious, and prohibited marriage, but allowed fornication and concubinage". For instance, in 1527 all but 10 out of 200 Catholic clergymen in Thuringia were living with women outside marriage.

The Council of Trent (which began in 1545 in reaction to the Protestant Reformation) formally ratified the Catholic view that marriage was a sacrament and set strict guidelines around what constituted a legitimate marriage in Catholic eyes.

In his 1930 encyclical, Casti connubii, Pope Pius XI strongly condemned premarital sex and all forms of "experimental" marriage.

The Catholic belief that premarital sex is sinful was reasserted in Pope John Paul II's 1993 encyclical, Veritatis Splendor.

In 2012, Pope Benedict XVI claimed that premarital sex and cohabitation were "gravely sinful" and "damaging to the stability of society". The Catholic Church continues to teach that premarital sex is disordered and sinful and believes that sexual relations are only acceptable between a married couple.

The 2012 British Social Attitudes survey showed that only one in ten British Catholics and Anglicans thought that premarital sex was wrong (however, of those who attended church on a weekly basis, only 23% thought it was permissible).

A 1994 study of French Catholics showed that 83% preferred to listen to their consciences rather than to the official position of the Catholic Church when making major decisions in their lives, leading to 75% of Catholics, by 2003, to say that cohabitation outside marriage is a personal matter and 13% to say whether it is right or not depends on circumstances.

A 2004 survey showed vastly different attitudes among Catholics in different nations. For instance, in Germany, 76% of Catholics agreed or strongly agreed that cohabitation before marriage was acceptable. In Spain, that number was 72%, in the Czech Republic it was 66% and in France it was 62%. At the other end of the spectrum, only 32% of Australian Catholics thought it was acceptable, followed by 39% in the Philippines and 43% in the United States.

The same survey sought to show the number of Catholics who believed that premarital sex is "not wrong at all" or "wrong only sometimes". In the Czech Republic, 84% of Catholics believed this, in France it was 83% and in Germany it was 80%. At the other end of the scale, in the Philippines it was 21%, in Ireland it was 51% and in Australia and the United States it was 64%. The survey also claimed that 40% of Catholic women in the United States have cohabited outside marriage.

The 2013 British Social Attitudes survey showed that Catholics have become even more accepting than Anglicans of having children outside wedlock: in 1989, 73% of British Catholics thought people should marry before having children; whereas, by 2012, just 43% thought so.

A 2014 survey showed that most German Catholics did not agree with the Church's views against premarital sex.

===== Lutheranism =====
According to Susan C. Karant-Nunn and Merry E. Wiesner-Hanks in their book, Luther on Women, Martin Luther felt that "The sex act was of course sinful outside of marriage." In his sermon on the Epistle to the Ephesians Chapter 5, Luther stated:

In naming uncleanness in addition to fornication, the reference is to all sensual affections in distinction from wedded love. They are too unsavory for him [Paul] to mention by name, though in Romans 1, 24 he finds it expedient to speak of them without disguise. However, also wedded love must be characterized by moderation among Christians.

On another occasion, Luther wrote, "I [...] pass over the good or evil which experience offers, and confine myself to such good as Scripture and truth ascribe to marriage. It is no slight boon that in wedlock fornication and unchastity are checked and eliminated. This in itself is so great a good that it alone should be enough to induce men to marry forthwith, and for many reasons... The first reason is that fornication destroys not only the soul but also body, property, honor, and family as well. For we see how a licentious and wicked life not only brings great disgrace but is also a spendthrift life, more costly than wedlock, and that illicit partners necessarily occasion greater suffering for one another than do married folk. Beyond that it consumes the body, corrupts flesh and blood, nature, and physical constitution. Through such a variety of evil consequences God takes a rigid position, as though he would actually drive people away from fornication and into marriage. However, few are thereby convinced or converted."

Exploring this matter in more depth when writing on 1 Thessalonians 4:3–5, Luther advises, "All young people should avoid casual sex and preserve their purity. They should resolve to strengthen themselves against lust and sexual passions by reading and meditating on a psalm or some other portion of God's Word... If your sexual appetites continually tempt you, be patient. Resist them as long as necessary, even if it takes more than a year. But above all, keep praying! If you feel that you can't stand it any longer, pray that God will give you a devout spouse with whom you can live in harmony and true love... I have known many people who, because of their crude and shameful fantasies, indulged their passion with unrestrained lust. Because of their insatiable desires, they abandoned self control, and lapsed into terrible immorality. In the end, they had to endure dreadful punishment. Blinded to the realities of married life, some of them took unsuitable mates and ended up in incompatible relationships. They got what they deserved. You must pray diligently and strive to resist the desires of your corrupt nature. Ask God to give you a Rebekah or Isaac instead of a Delilah or Samson – or someone even worse. Finding a devoted, loyal wife or husband isn't a matter of good luck. It's not the result of good judgment, as unbelievers think. Rather, a devout spouse is a gift from God."

Luther however, in contrast to his Catholic opponents, believed that it was not the Church's business to define marriage law. He understood marriage to be a legal agreement rather than a sacrament. He stated that marriage was instituted by God but its regulation was the business of the State, not the Church. Luther defined marriage as "the God-appointed and legitimate union of man and woman in the hope of having children or at least for the purpose of avoiding fornication and sin and living to the glory of God. The ultimate purpose is to obey God, to find aid and counsel against sin; to call upon God; to seek, love, and educate children for the glory of God; to live with one's wife in the fear of God and to bear the cross..."

Martin Bucer argued that sexual intimacy belonged in marriage and that, in marriage, the man becomes "the head and saviour of the wife and forms one flesh with her in order to avoid fornication and that the wife is the body and help of her husband, again to avoid fornication". Marriage for him, though, not only meant the avoidance of sin and procreation of children but social and emotional bonding resulting in a fellowship. As Selderhuis notes, for Bucer, "When people conduct themselves lasciviously, either as married or unmarried folk, they fall under divine judgement [...] Marriage [...] [is] the context in which sexual intimacy should have its place [...] Marriage is, after all, the only framework within which sexual desires can be legitimately satisfied."

Immanuel Kant, who was raised as a Pietist, considered sex before marriage to be immoral. He argued that sexual desire objectifies the person one craves and, since no logically consistent ethical rule allows one to use a person as an object, it is immoral to have sex (outside marriage). Marriage makes the difference because, in marriage, the two people give all of themselves to create a union and, thus, now have rights over each other as each now belongs to the other. As Kant himself puts it, "The sole condition on which we are free to make use of our sexual desires depends upon the right to dispose over the person as a whole – over the welfare and happiness and generally over all the circumstances of that person… each of them [...] [are obliged] to surrender the whole of their person to the other with a complete right to disposal over it."

Today, the Lutheran Church of Australia asserts that premarital sex is sinful. It believes that sexual activity belongs within the marriage relationship only and that the practice of premarital sex is in "violation of the will of God".

In the United States, pastors of the Lutheran Church–Missouri Synod undertook a survey on premarital sex among their congregations in 2010. "These Lutheran pastors reported that over 57 percent of the couples they now marry are living together prior to the wedding, and that the rate of cohabitation in their congregations is increasing." Despite this trend, the synod believes that "Regardless of the reasons given for living together, cohabitation is simply wrong for Christians."

The Wisconsin Evangelical Lutheran Synod (WELS) takes the view that "Any use of the gift of sex aside from the marriage bond is adultery, whether this is premarital or extramarital [...] To engage in premarital or extramarital sex, before or outside of marriage, is to sin in God's sight. That is precisely the point of Hebrews 13:4, a verse often referred to in this kind of discussion. 'Marriage' and the marriage bed [...] go together and are to be kept pure. Using the 'bed' aside from 'marriage' is sin that God will judge... The counsel given in 1 Corinthians 7:9 makes the same point. If a person has sexual urges and the sex drive (a good gift from God in itself) expresses itself within a person, that person has a God-pleasing remedy identified: to be married and thus obtain the right to be sexually active. Before or outside of marriage, sinful lust is sinful lust."

Elsewhere on its official site, WELS states that "Even though our unbelieving society embraces living together outside marriage as an acceptable lifestyle, it is still a sinful arrangement. A pastor or congregation will deal patiently with cohabitating people who are seeking spiritual guidance [...] [and a] Christian life of sanctification. This is done by firmly yet gently confronting them with their sin... and then guiding them to change their behavior to show their love for Christ."

The Evangelical Lutheran Church in America (ELCA) delivered a detailed document, entitled A Social Statement on Human Sexuality, in 2009. With regard to sex before marriage, the document, declares that "Because this church urges couples to seek the highest social and legal support for their relationships, it does not favor cohabitation arrangements outside marriage. It has a special concern when such arrangements are entered into as an end in themselves. It does, however, acknowledge the social forces at work that encourage such practices. This church also recognizes the pastoral and familial issues that accompany these contemporary social patterns. In cases where a decision is made for cohabitation, regardless of the reasons, this church expects its pastors and members to be clear with the couple regarding the reasons for the position of this church and to support the couple in recognizing their obligation to be open and candid with each other about their plans, expectations, and levels of mutual commitment. Some cohabitation arrangements can be constructed in ways that are neither casual nor intrinsically unstable... This church believes, however, that the deepest human longings for a sense of personal worth, long-term companionship, and profound security, especially given the human propensity to sin, are best served through binding commitment, legal protections, and the public accountability of marriage, especially where the couple is surrounded by the prayers of the congregational community and the promises of God."

The Evangelical Lutheran Church of Finland's stance on the issue is ambiguous. It strictly condemns extramarital sex but in relation to premarital sex it states only that "Sexuality disconnected from love and from responsibility enslaves people, bringing harm to themselves and others."

According to the Kinsey Institute, "Today, the Swedish Lutheran Church is very liberal in action, but careful not to take formal stands in most sexual issues, such as premarital sex, cohabitation, and sex education."

The Lutheran Church in Germany (EKD) has noted that all forms of long-term cohabitation are vulnerable and that legislators must give due recognition to the fundamental significance of marriage. The Church has further stated that "Marriage and family alone can be considered as role models for living together."

The Australian non-denominational Christian teen sex education website, "Boys Under Attack", cites Lutheran sources to assert that people should maintain virginity until marriage. The site asserts that all sexual activity – including oral sex and manual sex – between unmarried persons is a sin.

===== Anabaptists =====
Anabaptists such as Mennonites believe that sex outside marriage is sinful. The Mennonite Confession of Faith states "According to Scripture, right sexual union takes place only within the marriage relationship. Scripture places sexual intimacy within God's good created order. Sexual union is reserved for the marriage bond."

===== Reformed =====
The Reformed tradition has traditionally always asserted that engaging in premarital sex is a sin. Calvin himself said little on why he thought engaged couples should not have sex and Witte believes his rationale for the prohibition was vague but he did seek to reduce the length of engagements among couples in Geneva to less than six weeks, to reduce the temptation of premarital sex. He agreed, though, with Luther that marriage was a legal matter for the state, not a sacramental matter for the church.

John Witte Jr. has written a study on John Calvin and marriage and family life. In it, he notes that, "For Calvin, the Commandment against adultery was equally binding on the unmarried, and equally applicable to both illicit sexual activities per se, and various acts leading to the same. Calvin condemned fornication sternly – sexual intercourse or other illicit acts of sexual touching, seduction, or enticement by non-married parties, including those who were engaged to each other or to others. He decried at length the widespread practice of casual sex, prostitution, concubinage, premarital sex, nonmarital cohabitation and other forms of bed hopping that he encountered in modern day Geneva as well as in ancient Bible stories. All these actions openly defied God's commandment against adultery and should be punished by spiritual and criminal sanctions. Calvin preached against fornication constantly... He often led the Consistory in rooting out fornicators and subjecting them to admonition and the ban, and to fines and short imprisonment." Theodore Beza likewise strictly condemned it.

Raymond A. Mentzer notes that, "Wherever Calvinism took root – Geneva and France, the Low Countries and Rhine Valley, Scotland, England and New England – an element of moral rigor... accompanied it. Churches fashioned in the Calvinist tradition have typically set extremely high standard of behavior and, more particularly, sought to compel a strict morality within the community..." Sin, including sexual sin, was not simply considered a private failing; it affected the whole congregation. E. William Monter asserts that, "The supposedly repressive dimension of Calvinist morality affected women's lives in ways which were often beneficial... Each year the [Genevan] Consistory judged a half-dozen cases of fornication by engaged couples and as many accusations of illicit sex between masters and servants." In the 1560s, a consistory met for the first time in Nîmes. The town soon had a Protestant majority but it still faced an enormous task in cleaning up morals as one of the first Protestant-controlled societies in France. According to Mentzer, one third of excommunications in Nîmes between the 1560s and the 1580s were due to improper sexual behaviour. At this time, proper conduct was considered as much a public matter as a private matter. The struggle against worldly dissoluteness, and the enforcement of respect for the family and the pacification of society were setting Nîmes "on the path towards social reform and, by extension, modernity itself."

As a result of this new moral rigour, there were remarkably low rates of premarital conceptions and illegitimate births among Huguenots by the seventeenth century in France compared to the rates among their Catholic opponents, from whom the Reformed sought to distinguish themselves by their moral holiness. The low illegitimate birth rate indicates that the Calvinists had internalised the values that condemned premarital sex as immoral.

An interesting case is that of Pierre Palma Cayet, who scandalously wrote a book in which he provided a scriptural defence of brothels, prostitution and fornication, which led to him being deposed as a Huguenot pastor. Shortly afterwards, in 1595, he re-converted to Catholicism. He was readily accepted back into that church as a priest.

According to scholar Nicholas Must, "Marriage was, in the equations of Huguenot ministers... a means to avoid promiscuity and lechery. As a result of this, many sermons that dealt with marriage were also an opportunity to announce the dangers of illicit sex while, at the same time, offering a relatively positive appraisal of conjugal sex. For instance, Jean Mestrezat declares simply that marriage is the recommended solution for illicit sexuality, since God hates all impurities, especially paillardise [sexual immorality]... In another sermon, [Pastor Jean] Daillé provides a close hermeneutical reading of paillardise in a sermon on 1 Corinthians 10:8 when he states that it includes 'all the species of this sin, that is to say all the faults of this nature, which are committed by any person, whether married or not, simple fornication as well as adultery'." To the Huguenot, "simple fornication" is a "grave sin".

Throughout the centuries, French Huguenots have remained strictly opposed to fornication in all circumstances. An example is the famous French Protestant pastor, André Trocmé, (active in the 1940s), who is on record as having been against all premarital and extramarital sex.

Today, French Calvinists maintain very high ethical standards and feel themselves to be different from their French Catholic neighbours, in terms of their attitudes and higher standards of behaviour, including sexual behaviour. Indeed, French Reformed Christians "are widely regarded as having particularly high standards of honesty and integrity". Even one of France's most liberal Reformed Calvinist churches, L'Oratoire du Louvre in Paris, today still condemns premarital sex, including casual sex and sex with prostitutes in all circumstances.

The famous Swiss Reformed theologian, Karl Barth, discussed sexual morality in his magnum opus, Church Dogmatics. He stated that "Coitus without coexistence is demonic" Barth goes on to state that "the physical sexuality of man should form an integral part of his total humanity as male or female, and that the completion of the sexual relation should be integrated into the total encounter of man and woman. All right or wrong and therefore salvation or perdition in this matter depends on whether it is viewed in isolation and abstraction or within this whole... If it is not, if physical sexuality and sex relations have their own right and authority in which man and woman and their encounter may be controlled and fulfilled, then it is a demonic business. Naturally, the command of God will always resist any such idea of sovereign physical sexuality." For Barth, to engage in sex outside marriage is not only rebellious but dehumanising as it puts humans on the level of animals, driven by passion and a search for self-gratification.

Furthermore, for Barth, "A wedding is only the regulative confirmation and legitimation of a marriage before and by society. It does not constitute a marriage." Sex within marriage can be sinful as well unless it affirms the coexistence of the couple. This opens the door to a more holistic understanding of sex.

However, a few modern Swiss Reformed theologians, such as Michel Cornuz, take the teleological view that premarital sex is permissible if the sexual activities take a form which respects the partner and helps the relationship grow in intimacy. These theologians hold that it is when a relationship is exploitive that it is sinful. (Hence, engaging in sex with prostitutes is always sinful as it is an exploitive relationship and does not allow the participants to grow in dignity.) This change has come about within the last two generations in Switzerland. Prior to that, the cultural norm was that the couple would not engage in sex before marriage. Hence, the modern Reformed theologians have endeavoured to meet the challenge of applying Christian teaching to this massive cultural change in Switzerland.

Essentially, Cornuz and his colleagues feel that one should always be true to one's individual conscience, so if the person feels sex before marriage is sinful, they should listen to their conscience and abstain. The key thing is that it is up to the couple themselves to decide if engaging in premarital sex or remaining virgins is the best way for them to reflect the love of God in their relationship.

According to Mentzer, during the first fifty years of the Scottish Reformation, "more than two-thirds of the cases brought before the Consistory involved illicit sex... everything else paled before the apparent obsession of Scots Calvinists with sex". This contrasted strikingly with the data from Germany, the Netherlands and France. For the parish of Saint Andrews, fornication accounted for 47% of all cases heard between 1573 and 1600. 986 were charged with fornication (sexual intercourse between two single persons) and 813 with "fornication antenuptial" (sexual intercourse between two people who were engaged to each other but not yet married). Between 1595 and 1597, the fornication levels in Saint Andrews plummeted. "The only [...] explanation for the relative absence of sexual offences, improbably though it may seem, is that a [...] genuine 'reformation of manners' took place in the burgh." Mentzer and Graham argue that this focus on sex may actually be due to the Kirk's early weakness. "Since there is strong sentiment in Western societies today that governments should stay out of the private lives of citizens, the church courts today seem nosy or even voyeuristic to our modern eyes. But this was no all-powerful Big Brother peering into bedroom windows. Rather the Kirk's obsession with sex was more a sign of its weakness than its strength [...] The need to discourage illicit sexuality was accepted by nearly all powers [...] even when they could agree on little else." Only when ministers and presbyters gradually gained a stronger position were they able to gradually turn their focus to other disciplinary breaches surrounding the Sabbath, superstitious practices, neighborly disputes and so forth.

Scottish Calvinists today remain deeply opposed to any kind of sex outside marriage. In 2008, the Scottish health minister, Shona Robison noted, "There are deeply-held views on moral issues and cultural and lifestyle issues... The Highlands in general [...] have a strong Calvinistic streak, a prudish thing that sees sex as something that happens behind closed doors and drawn curtains. As a consequence of this and because of lack of a scene for gay people, both straight and gay people are being driven out into these isolated areas to have [casual] sex."

The American Presbyterian Church, "like other Christian bodies, has viewed marriage as a prerequisite to sexual intercourse and considered sex outside marriage a sin".

The prominent conservative American Calvinist theologian, R. C. Sproul, opposes premarital sex on the grounds that the marriage covenant is an essential legal safeguard, protecting both members of the couple from each other's sinfulness.

===== Anglicanism =====
The official resolutions of the Anglican Church are produced by the bishops in attendance at the Lambeth Conferences, which are held every ten years. The 1988 Lambeth Conference made this declaration in its Resolution on Marriage and Family: "Noting the gap between traditional Christian teaching on pre-marital sex, and the life-styles being adopted by many people today, both within and outside the Church: (a) calls on provinces and dioceses to adopt a caring and pastoral attitude to such people; (b) reaffirms the traditional biblical teaching that sexual intercourse is an act of total commitment which belongs properly within a permanent married relationship; (c) in response to the International Conference of Young Anglicans in Belfast, urges provinces and dioceses to plan with young people programmes to explore issues such as pre-marital sex in the light of traditional Christian values" (Resolution 34).

A subsequent resolution was made at the 1998 Lambeth Conference. This sitting of the Conference resolved, "In view of the teaching of Scripture, [the Anglican Church] upholds faithfulness in marriage between a man and a woman in lifelong union, and believes that abstinence is right for those who are not called to marriage" (Resolution I.10). This Resolution also commended a report on human sexuality entitled Called to Full Humanity which stated that, "The Holy Scriptures and Christian tradition teach that human sexuality is intended by God to find its rightful and full expression between a man and a woman in the covenant of marriage, established by God in creation, and affirmed by our Lord Jesus Christ. Holy Matrimony is, by intention and divine purpose, to be a lifelong, monogamous and unconditional commitment between a woman and a man. The Lambeth Conference 1978 and 1998 both affirmed 'marriage to be sacred, instituted by God and blessed by our Lord Jesus Christ'. The New Testament and Christian history identify singleness and dedicated celibacy as Christ-like ways of living."

Historically, the English reformers had taken a stern view of adultery and fornication, which Homily 11 of the First Book of Homilies (1547) defined to include "all unlawfull use of those parts, which bee ordeyned for generation".

Prior to the Marriage Act 1753 (commonly known as the Hardwicke Act), British couples could live together and have sex after their betrothal or "the spousals". Theologian Adrian Thatcher claims that, before the Act was introduced, in the United Kingdom the betrothal was a formal, preliminary stage of marriage involving vows. During this stage, the marriage would become permanent and indissoluble if sexual intercourse occurred or when final vows were taken, whichever came first. Either of these would render "the conditional promise unconditional". Hence, having sex would automatically turn the betrothal into a finalized, indissoluble marriage. Betrothal vows were given in the future tense, hence sexual intercourse "activated" them, signalling the beginning of the binding marriage.

The Council of Trent in the Catholic Church and the above-mentioned Marriage Act in the United Kingdom eliminated the tradition of the betrothal stage of marriage. In the Eastern Orthodox Churches, betrothal still exists but it has been combined into the wedding ceremony, rather than remaining as its own separate stage of the marriage process.

Thatcher notes that, today, "Non-nuptial cohabitation is unlikely ever to be thought consistent with Christian faith if only because God wills only what is best for us, and there [are] good reasons for thinking that these arrangements are not the best for us." He outlines some of the damage he believes is caused by cohabitation outside marriage in his paper, supported by empirical data.

In the United Kingdom, whilst the State defined who was married, it was the Anglican Church that was given the responsibility to police this law for the State. Today, Britain remains abnormal among European nations in having Church weddings whereas most other nations on that continent insist on civil registrations leaving it up to the couple if they choose to have a religious ceremony as well.

The 1984 English Anglican booklet Forward to Marriage showed a tolerance of premarital sex but strongly endorsed marriage as "a necessary commitment for a long-term relationship".

In 1987, the American Bishop John Shelby Spong's Newark Diocese had commissioned a report that concluded that the "Episcopal Church should recognize and bless committed non-marital sexual relationships between homosexuals, young adults, the divorced and widowed". The report aimed "to ignite a new debate on sexual ethics among leaders of the nation's 3 million Episcopalians in the hope that they will amend church doctrine to embrace all believers [...] Spong, an advocate of the recommendations [...] said his views are a minority position in the church."

Also in 1987, the General Synod of the Church of England asserted "(1) that sexual intercourse is an act of total commitment which belongs properly within a permanent married relationship, (2) that fornication and adultery are sins against this ideal, and are to be met by a call to repentance and the exercise of compassion".

The 1996 National Church Life Survey in Australia found that Australian Anglicans were more liberal about premarital sex than churchgoers from other denominations but more conservative than the general (non-church going) population. The survey noted a divide between Anglicans who wanted to support sexually active unmarried couples in their churches and others who did not. A 2009 survey found that Anglicans (along with Baptists, Catholics and Uniting Church members) had become a little more accepting of premarital sex compared to a 1993 survey, whereas Pentecostal Christians had become markedly more conservative. 54% of Australian church attenders felt premarital sex was always or almost always wrong, whereas only 3% of non-church attenders thought it was always or usually wrong. Among those who attended church on a weekly basis, the percentage of those who thought premarital sex was always or almost always wrong rose to 67%.

A 2002 survey by the Church Times in England found that less than half of the 5,000 readers questioned said it was wrong for men and women to have sex before they married. Over 25% also said it was acceptable for a couple to live together without ever intending to marry.

The 2003 report, Cohabitation: A Christian Reflection, produced by the Diocese of Southwark, found that the Church's traditional teaching that sex before marriage is wrong has been inherited from a different form of society than that which exists today. However, the report then cited research that illustrates the problems that accompany cohabitation, particularly with regard to raising children. It concluded that marriage is "a much more satisfactory social convention than cohabitation", but says that the Church has failed to present marriage in a way that captures the imagination of young people and that the Church needed to rise to the challenge and rediscover its confidence in marriage. The report noted that Paul gave a "cautious welcome" to marriage, but that there was also a "militant apostolic view" that favoured celibacy, which "was seen as more noble than marriage" by many early Christians. The report also noted that "the strict sexual codes of the earliest Christian communities helped to give them a separate identity distinct from the sexual hedonism of the pagan world."

The report ultimately rejected the possibility that cohabitation with no intention to marry is acceptable for members of the Christian Church.

In a 2004 interview, the Anglican Primate of Australia, Archbishop Peter Carnley, noted that heterosexual de facto relationships and a disinclination to commit were more serious worries for him than the same-sex marriage movement. When asked if he thought sexual morality was subjective, he disagreed, stating "I think it's possible to say, for example, that it is objectively quite clear that promiscuity is a bad thing."

In 2009, N. T. Wright noted that, in popular discourse, there has been a "supposed modern and scientific discovery of a personal 'identity' characterised by sexual preference, which then generates a set of 'rights' [...] Without entering into discussion of the scientific evidence, it must be said that the Christian notion of personal identity has never before been supposed to be rooted in desires of whatever sort. Indeed, desires are routinely brought under the constraints of 'being in Christ'. This quite new notion of an 'identity' found not only within oneself but within one's emotional and physical desires needs to be articulated on the basis of scripture and tradition, and this to my mind has not been done [...] The church has never acknowledged that powerful sexual instincts, which almost all human beings have, generate a prima facie 'right' that these instincts receive physical expression. All are called to chastity and, within that, some are called to celibacy; but a call to celibacy is not the same thing as discovering that one has a weak or negligible sexual drive. The call to the self-control of chastity is for all: for the heterosexually inclined who, whether married or not, are regularly and powerfully attracted to many different potential partners, just as much as for those with different instincts."

On another occasion, Wright stated, "We need to remind ourselves that the entire biblical sexual ethic is deeply counter-intuitive. All human beings some of the time, and some human beings most of the time, have deep heartfelt longings for kinds of sexual intimacy or gratification (multiple partners, pornography, whatever) which do not reflect the creator's best intentions for his human creatures, intentions through which new wisdom and flourishing will come to birth. Sexual restraint is mandatory for all, difficult for most, extremely challenging for some. God is gracious and merciful but this never means that his creational standards don't really matter after all."

The former Archbishop of Canterbury, Rowan Williams, and the Archbishop of York, John Sentamu, have expressed tolerance of cohabitation. In 2011, John Sentamu, commenting on Prince William and Catherine's decision to live together before their wedding, said that the royal couple's public commitment to live their lives together today would be more important than their past. Sentamu said that he had conducted wedding services for "many cohabiting couples" during his time as a vicar in south London. Rowan Williams stated he did not personally believe sex outside marriage to be a sin and noted in 2002 that he found it hard to reconcile his liberal personal beliefs with the public stance of the Church. However, in 2008, Doctor Williams said, "Sex outside marriage is not as God purposes it [...] I always find it difficult to condense sexual ethics into a soundbite [...] All I can say is where the Church stands – it's not a question of what Rowan Williams's view is [...] the biblical view of sexual relations is consistently within the pattern of absolute mutual commitment, reflecting God's commitment to his people. And the assumption of the Bible is that that commitment is heterosexual. That is the framework we work in."

In his earlier 1997 essay, "Forbidden Fruit: New Testament Sexual Ethics", Dr Williams had noted, "I can't see that the New Testament easily allows any straightforwardly positive evaluation of sexual intimacy outside a relationship that is publicly committed [in marriage]."

In 2013, Williams' successor, Justin Welby, stated that "My understanding of sexual ethics has been that, regardless of whether it's gay or straight, sex outside marriage is wrong." He reiterated this belief again later in 2013, further noting that, "To abandon the ideal simply because it's difficult to achieve is ridiculous." After Welby made his first statement, a Sunday Times poll found that "A majority of adults (69%, including 76% of those professing no faith) believe Justin Welby to be wrong in condemning sex outside marriage, while 17% think he is right (including 30% of Anglicans), and 13% are unsure."

The Kinsey Institute comments that:

Prior to the 1950s, the religious influences forming sexual constructs [in Britain] came almost exclusively from "the official church" of England, and "unofficially" from the other Christian denominations. In recent decades, the picture has become more complex. Since midcentury, the Church of England's approach to social morality and sexuality has fluctuated between two poles, the traditionalists and the modernists, or the "permission givers" and the "orthodox moral directors". With the national religious scene resembling the circular approach of the politicians to sexual knowledge and attitudes, the sociosexual control and influence appears to bounce back and forth between church and state according to a mutually cooperative formula... This doctrinal "pendulum" is confusing for the majority of the population who are not experts at moral and theological niceties and subtleties. The people themselves are part of the system of confusion: While expecting clear and definite moral messages from both establishment and Church, they reserve the right to judge the validity of those messages, even when they are biblically based.

The 2013 British Social Attitudes survey found that members of the Church of England have become more accepting of premarital sex over the past 30 years. In 1983, 31% of British Anglicans surveyed thought that premarital sex was "always" or "mostly" wrong whereas, in 2012, only 10% thought this was the case. Likewise, in 1989, 78% of Anglicans surveyed thought that people should marry before having children. In 2012, this had declined to 54%.

===== Methodism =====
The American Methodist theologian and pastor, Ben Witherington III, believes that "virginity in a woman was highly valued before marriage [in biblical cultures] [...] In early Jewish law if you had sex with a woman you were considered married to her or you had shamed her. See the story of Mary and Joseph. Porneia can refer to all sorts of sexual sin including deflowering a virgin [...] there was no dating or physical intimacy prior to an arranged marriage in the vast majority of cases. The notion of dating doesn't exist in Jesus and Paul's world. Second, honor and shame cultures placed a high value on sexual purity. Notice how prostitutes were stigmatized. Women were mainly blamed for sexual immorality. Finally Jesus gave his disciples two choices in Mt. 19 – fidelity in heterosexual marriage or being a eunuch! This means no sex outside marriage."

The position of the United Methodist Church in the United States on the issue is as follows: "Although all persons are sexual beings whether or not they are married, sexual relations are only clearly affirmed in the marriage bond."

The Uniting Church in Australia is still formulating its views on the subject. It recognises the changes in marriage practice and lifestyle that have resonated throughout society and that the UCA is perceived by the public of being more accepting of the realities of humanity than many other denominations. A report noted that scripture is not really about marriage as understood in contemporary Western societies and, in fact, has very little to say about it. In the report, the church also acknowledged that many unmarried people had sex but neither condemned nor endorsed it, instead noting that there were many different views within the church.

Stanley Hauerwas argues that questions about sex before marriage need to be reframed in terms of the narrative of the church. He asks individuals to consider if it is a pure or licentious lifestyle that will best prepare the Christian to live out and serve in the narrative of the church. Doctor Hauerwas goes on to conclude, "For the issue is not whether X or Y form of sexual activity is right or wrong, as if such activity could be separated from a whole way of life [...] The issue is not whether someone is chaste in the sense of not engaging in genital activity, but whether we have lived in a manner that allows us to bring a history with us that contributes to the common history we may be called upon to develop with one another. Chastity, we forget, is not a state but a form of the virtue of faithfulness that is necessary for a role in the community [...] what the young properly demand is an account of life and the initiation into a community that makes intelligible why their interest in sex should be subordinated to other interests. What they, and we, demand is the lure of an adventure that captures the imagination sufficiently that conquest means more than the sexual possession of another. I have tried to suggest that marriage and singleness for Christians should represent just such an adventure, and if it does not, no amount of ethics or rules will be sufficient to correct the situation."

===== Quakers =====
The majority of Quakers, who are evangelical in orientation, maintain traditional Christian views regarding human sexuality, as described in the Manual of Faith and Practice of the Evangelical Friends Church International:

Evangelical Friends believe that sex is a beautiful gift of God when it joins a man and a woman together in self-giving love. We hold that this depth of relationship is appropriate only in marriage and that sexual relations should be abstained from outside the marriage bond. Evangelical Friends believe that same-sex marriages violate God's Word. Temptation to sexual relations outside the marriage covenant of man and woman – husband and wife – may be overcome by the grace of God. Evangelical Friends cooperate with ministries and recommend resources – Biblically-based books, clinics and counselors – which offer counseling for sexual addictions and moral failures of any kind. Those who minister to individuals in the areas of heterosexual and homosexual sin are strongly encouraged by Evangelical Friends to respond to them with clarity and compassion. The basis for a good marriage is not sexual alone, but true love that is developed through communication, mutual respect, deep friendship, and a lifetime of self-giving, as the Apostle Paul admonished. Evangelical Friends who find severe difficulty in their marriage relationship are urged to prayerfully seek counsel from a pastor or a Christian counselor who can mediate those problems in order that the marriage be restored to the state God desires.

Liberal Friends, however, generally have a broader view of human sexually, as stated in the Faith and Practice of the Philadelphia Yearly Meeting:

Friends seek to acknowledge and nurture sexuality as a divine gift that celebrates human love with joy and intimacy. In defining healthy sexuality, Friends are guided by our testimonies: that sexual relationships are equal, not exploitative; that sexual behavior be marked by integrity; and that sex is an act of love, not aggression. Sexuality is at once an integral and an intricate part of personality. Understanding our own sexuality is an essential aspect of our journey toward wholeness. Learning to incorporate sexuality into our lives responsibly, joyfully and with integrity is a lifelong process beginning in childhood. Friends are wary of a fixed moral code to govern sexual activity. The sacramental quality of the sexual relationship depends upon Spirit as well as on the motives of the persons concerned.

— Philadelphia Yearly Meeting of the Religious Society of Friends, Faith and Practice, Page 41

===== Baptists =====
A 2013 study of 151 newly married young adults at nine Southern Baptist churches in Texas found that over 70% of respondents reported having had premarital vaginal or oral sex. The Southern Baptist scholar Frank Stagg interpreted the New Testament as saying that sex is reserved for marriage. He maintained that the New Testament teaches that sex outside marriage is a sin of adultery if either sexual participant is married, otherwise the sin of fornication if both sexual participants are unmarried.

The Southern Baptists' Ethics and Religious Liberties Commission also condemns premarital sex on the grounds of their interpretation of the Bible. Feeling that marriage is a "divine institution" the Southern Baptist position is closer to that of Catholic sacramentalism than that of Luther and Calvin who maintained marriage was a legal agreement and the business of the State.

===== Pentecostals =====
In Australia, Pentecostals are increasingly opposed to the concept of premarital sex. In 1993, 62% of Australian Pentecostals felt that sex before marriage was wrong. By 2009, that figure had jumped to 78%.

==== Statistics and studies ====
According to a 2004 peer-reviewed study published in the Journal of Marriage and Family, women who have more than one premarital sexual relationship have a higher likelihood in the long run of disruptions if they eventually get married, with this effect being the "strongest for women who have multiple premarital coresidential unions". Kahn and London (1991) found that premarital sex and divorce are positively correlated.

In his book Forbidden Fruit: Sex & Religion in the Lives of American Teenagers, sociologist Mark Regnerus notes that "Evangelical Christian teens are more likely to have lost their virginity earlier than mainline Protestants. They start having sex on average at age 16.3 and are more likely than other religious groups to have had three or more sexual partners by age 17." A 2019 study by the Institute for Family Studies in the US found that Protestants have a higher rate of never married young people who have had sex than Catholics.

A 2012 study, the National Survey of Reproductive and Contraceptive Knowledge, found that 80% of young American evangelical Christians aged between 18 and 29 are having premarital sex.

A 2012 survey found 56% of unmarried evangelical Christians between the ages of 18 and 29 were never sexually active. Unlike previous studies, this survey did not rely on respondents simply identifying themselves as "evangelical" but also had to attend a Protestant church at least once a month, believe that they will go to heaven when they die because they have accepted Jesus Christ as their Savior, strongly agree that the Bible is the written word of God and is accurate in all that it teaches, that their personal commitment to Jesus Christ is still important to their lives today, that eternal salvation is possible only through Jesus Christ, and that they personally have a responsibility to tell others about their religious beliefs. The same survey also found higher religiosity, as measured by frequency of Bible reading, was correlated with a lower rate of non-marital sexual activity.

A 2014 press release from online dating websites announced the results of a poll of 2,600 Americans in their attitudes towards dating and sex. The poll found that 61 percent of Christians believed they would have sex before marriage. Fifty-six percent found it appropriate to cohabit with a romantic partner after dating for a time between six months and two years.

For Evangelicals, virginity before marriage is very important. True Love Waits was founded in 1993 by the Sunday School Board of the Southern Baptist Convention. The aim is to educate young Christians about the benefits of sexual abstinence before marriage with the purity pledge. The program which consists mainly of signing pledge cards, purity rings and books, has been adopted by several evangelical denominations and organizations such as Cru and Youth for Christ.

=== Hinduism ===
Hindu texts present a range of views on sex. The hymn 4.5.5 of the Rigveda (ऋग्वेद) calls fornication pāpa (पाप, lit. 'evil' or 'sin'). According to the Indologist Wendy Doniger, the Vedic texts, including the Rigveda, the Atharvaveda (अथर्ववेद) and the Upanishads (उपनिषद्), also acknowledge the existence of male lovers and female lovers as a basic fact of human life, followed by the recommendation that one should avoid such extra marital sex during certain ritual occasions (yajna; यज्ञ). A number of similes in the Rigveda, states Doniger, describe a woman's emotional eagerness to meet her lover, and one hymn prays to the gods that they protect the embryo of a pregnant wife as she sleeps with her husband and other lovers.

Mandagadde Rama Jois translates verse 4.134 of Manusmriti as declaring fornication and adultery to be a heinous offense, and prescribes severe punishments. Verse 8.362 of Manusmriti exempts the rules on adultery for women who earn their own livelihood or are wives of traveling performances, where the woman enters into sexual liaisons on her own volition or with the encouragement of the husband. The Manusmriti (मनुस्मृति), states Doniger, offers two views on adultery. It recommends a new married couple to remain sexually faithful to each other for life. It also accepts that adulterous relationships happen, children are born from such relationships and then proceeds to reason that the child belongs to the legal husband of the pregnant woman, and not to the biological father. Other dharmasastra texts describe adultery as a punishable crime but differ significantly in the details. For example, adultery is not a punishable offence if "the woman's husband has abandoned her because she is wicked, or he is eunuch, or of a man who does not care, provided the wife initiates it of her own volition", states Indologist Richard Lariviere. According to Naradasmriti, adultery is not a punishable offence if a married man engages in intercourse with a woman who does not belong to another man and is not a Brahmin, provided the woman is not of higher caste than the man. The verse 5.154 of Manusmirti says women must worship their husband as a god and be completely faithful even if he commits adultery.

According to Ramanathan and Weerakoon, in Hinduism, sexual matters are left to the judgment of those involved and not a matter to be imposed through law. In the Kamasutra (कामसूत्र) which is not a religious text like Vedas or Puranas but an ancient text on love and sex, Vatsyayana discusses the merits of adultery. For example, states Ariel Glucklich, the sexual liaison is taught as a means for a man to predispose the involved woman in assisting him, working against his enemies, and facilitating his successes. It also explains the many signs and reasons a woman wants to enter into a sexual relationship outside of marriage, and when she does not want to commit adultery. It concludes its chapter on sexual liaison stating that one should not commit adultery because adultery pleases only one of two sides in a marriage, hurts the other, and goes against both dharma and artha.

Other Hindu texts present a more complex model of behavior and mythology where gods commit adultery for various reasons. For example, Krishna commits adultery and the Bhagavata Purana (भगवद पुराण) justifies it as something to be expected when Vishnu took a human form, just like sages become uncontrolled. According to Tracy Coleman, Radha and other gopis are indeed lovers of Krishna, but this is prema or "selfless, true love" and not carnal craving. In Hindu texts, this relationship between gopis and Krishna involves secret nightly rendezvous. Some texts state it to be divine adultery, others as a symbolism of spiritual dedication and religious value.

=== Islam ===
In Islamic law unlawful sexual intercourse is called zina (Arabic: زِنًى or زِنًا). Classification of homosexual intercourse as zina differs according to legal school. The Quran disapproved of the promiscuity prevailing in Arabia at the time, and several verses refer to unlawful sexual intercourse, including one that prescribes the punishment of 100 lashes for those who did zina. Four witnesses are required to prove the offense. Zina thus belong to the class of hadd (pl. hudud) crimes which have Quranically specified punishments.

Although stoning for zina is not mentioned in the Quran, all schools of traditional jurisprudence agreed on the basis of hadith that it is to be punished by stoning if the offender commits adultery and is muhsan (adult, free, Muslim, and having been married), with some extending this punishment to certain other cases and milder punishment prescribed in other scenarios. The offenders must have acted of their own free will. According to traditional jurisprudence, zina must be proved by testimony of four eyewitnesses to the actual act of penetration, or a confession repeated four times and not retracted later. The Maliki legal school also allows an unmarried woman's pregnancy to be used as evidence, but the punishment can be averted by a number of legal "semblances" (shubuhat), such as existence of an invalid marriage contract. Rape was traditionally prosecuted under different legal categories which used normal evidentiary rules. Making an accusation of zina without presenting the required eyewitnesses is called qadhf (القذف), which is itself a hadd crime.

A study published in 2013 found that Muslims are less likely to report having premarital sex than adherents of all other major religious groups. The same study found that Muslim women living in countries with a Muslim minority overall are "more than three times as likely to have had premarital sex as Muslim women in countries where 90 percent of the population adheres to Islam".

=== Judaism ===
While the Torah outlaws many types of sexual relationships, it is debated whether it prohibits premarital sex. Some scholars hold that Deuteronomy 22:13–22 forbids premarital sex as violation of cultural expectations of virginity until marriage. As sex within marriage is considered ideal, premarital sex has historically been frowned upon by Jewish authorities. Although considered undesirable, the Jewish religious authorities in the Talmud admitted the reality of premarital sexual relationships, and were somewhat ambivalent about such relationships. Orthodox Jews are still opposed to premarital sex.

A study published in 2013 found that over 80% of self-identified Jews had sex before marriage, and were more likely than other major religious groups to have had sex before marriage.

=== Sikhism ===
Sikhism condemns any type of adultery. Adultery falls under the Sikh moral tenet of kaam, which roughly translates to concupiscence, lust or greed which comes under the category of five sins as similar to Hinduism.

== See also ==
- Casual sex
- Free love
- Infidelity
- Open marriage
- Open relationship
- Relationship anarchy
- Religion and sexuality
- Sex-positive movement
- Sexual revolution
