= Christine Gardner =

American academic (born 1969)

- Born: 1969 (age 56–57)
- Other name: Christine Joy Gardner

Academic background
- Education: Seattle Pacific University (BA); University of Washington (MA); Northwestern University (PhD)

Academic work
- Discipline: Communication studies
- Institutions: Wheaton College; Gordon College
- Main interests: Gender studies; HIV/AIDS; philosophy of religion; public sphere; rhetoric; sex education; social movements
- Notable works: Making Chastity Sexy (2011)

Christine Joy Gardner (born 1969) is an American communication scholar and journalist. She is an associate professor and the chair of the Department of Communication Arts at Gordon College.

== Early life and education ==
Gardner was born in 1969. She has received degrees from Seattle Pacific University (BA in history), the University of Washington (MA in communications), and Northwestern University (PhD in philosophy in communication studies).

== Work ==
Gardner's articles have frequently been published in Christianity Today.

In 2012, her book Making Chastity Sexy won the Stephen E. Lucas Debut Publication Award for a scholarly monograph or book in the field of communication studies. In preparation for writing the book, Gardner spent five years doing research at chastity events in various locations in the United States and sub-Saharan Africa. In the United States, she focused her investigation on three evangelical organizations that advocate sexual abstinence: Silver Ring Thing, True Love Waits, and Pure Freedom.

== Personal life ==
Gardner self-identifies as evangelical. She is from Normal, Illinois.
