= League of the Cross =

Roman Catholic confraternity

The League of the Cross was a Roman Catholic total abstinence confraternity, founded in London in 1873 by Cardinal Manning. Its aim was to unite Catholics, both clergy and laity, in the warfare against intemperance; and thus to improve religious, social, and domestic conditions.

The original and chief centres of the League were London and Liverpool. Branches were organized in various cities of Great Britain and Ireland, Canada, and in Australia.

== Rules of the League ==
The fundamental rules of the League were:

- that the pledge shall be of total abstinence, and taken without limit as to time;
- that only Catholics can be members;
- that all members shall live as good, practical Catholics;
- that no one who is not a practical Catholic shall, as long as he fails to practise his religion, hold any office in the League.

== See also ==
- Pioneer Total Abstinence Association
