= Purity ball =

American style of Christian formal dance

A purity ball is a formal dance event typically practiced by some conservative Christian groups in the United States. The events are attended by fathers and their teenage daughters in order to promote virginity until marriage. Typically, daughters who attend a purity ball make a virginity pledge to remain sexually abstinent until marriage. Fathers who attend a purity ball make a promise to protect their young daughters' "purity of mind, body, and soul." The balls are considered a part of purity culture.

Proponents of these events believe that they encourage close and deeply affectionate relationships between fathers and daughters, thereby avoiding the premarital sexual activity that allegedly results when young women seek love through relationships with young men. Critics of the balls argue that they encourage and engrave dysfunctional expectations in the minds of the young women, making them vulnerable to believing their only value is as property, and teaching them that they must subjugate their own mental, physical, and emotional well-being to the needs of potentially or actually abusive partners.

== Origins ==
In 1998, the first purity ball was organized by Randy and Lisa Wilson in Colorado Springs, Colorado, United States of America. This event was created for the Wilsons' five daughters and the fathers that he viewed as not having a place in their daughters' lives. Randy Wilson is a director of the Family Research Council, and previously worked for Focus on the Family. The balls were promoted on the radio by James Dobson.

In 2012, the New York Times concluded "there is little hard evidence that purity balls have spread much beyond Colorado Springs" in spite of claims that the events are widespread. The newspaper notes that chastity-promotion events may go by other names, such as "father-daughter balls," in other locations.

Purity balls were most notorious during the early 2000s, but they continue. US Speaker of the House Mike Johnson took his daughter to a purity ball in 2015, describing women as "prey" who must be taught to avoid "predators."

== Ceremony ==
The ceremony is a formal event as daughters get dressed up in ball gowns, and the evening typically consists of dinner, a keynote speaker, ballroom dancing and a vow for fathers and daughters. The girls can range in age from their college years to four years old; however, the majority of girls are "just old enough… [to] have begun menstruating" as purity ball guidelines advise. Some ceremonies state a minimum age requirement.

Although the chastity pledges differ between organizations, the purity balls held by the creator of the concept, Pastor Randy Wilson, follow a symbolic ritual. Each father or mentor pledges to shield and protect his daughter; to live a pure life himself as a man, husband, and father; and, to be a man of integrity and responsibility as he acts as a role model for his family. The father's protecting role over the daughter's virginity is emphasized throughout the night, as Wilson states "Fathers, our daughters are waiting for us… They are desperately waiting for us in a culture that lures them into the murky waters of exploitation. They need to be rescued by you, their dad." One widely used pledge for fathers reads: "I, (daughter's name)'s father, choose before God to cover my daughter as her authority and protection in the area of purity. I will be pure in my own life as a man, husband and father. I will be a man of integrity and accountability as I lead, guide and pray over my daughter and my family as the high priest in my home. This covering will be used by God to influence generations to come."

Remembrance gifts are given at some ceremonies to represent the girl's promise of chastity and the father's oath to protect her and guide her in her lifestyle. One form of token is a charm bracelet or necklace in the shape of a heart for the girl and a key for her father, which symbolizes the father's duty to protect the young girl's heart, only giving away the key to her husband on her wedding day. The ceremonies close with a father–daughter waltz which aims to solidify the bond between father and daughter and elucidate the promoters' concept of a "proper date". Lisa Wilson, wife to Randy Wilson and co-founder of Generations of Light, a popular Christian ministry in Colorado Springs, states "We wanted to set a standard of dignity and honor for the way the girls should be treated by the men in their lives".

Wilson advises fathers to praise their daughters' physical attractiveness: "I applaud your courage to look your daughter in the eye and tell her how beautiful she is." Participants are described as "dates", and, according to Glamour magazine, could be mistaken for heterosexual romantic partners in the absence of information about their parent–child relationship.

== Beliefs and rationale ==
Advocates of purity balls assert that they promote physical, psychological, and spiritual integrity. Randy Wilson, one of the co-founders of the purity ball, states that "The idea was to model what the relationship can be as a daughter grows from a child to an adult. You come in closer, become available to answer whatever questions she has." Wilson did not want virginity pledges to become characteristic elements of purity balls as he questions the wisdom of such promises: "It heaps guilt upon them. If they fail, you've made it worse for them." In an interview with Anderson Cooper, Wilson said that purity balls encourage fathers to participate in their daughters' lives, provide guidance, and teach coping skills.

== Criticism ==
Jessica Valenti criticized purity balls in her 2010 book The Purity Myth. She says that the balls' central message is that women's sexuality is controlled by men. She further argues that the balls sexualize young girls; the event is often promoted as a "date." Writer and feminist Eve Ensler criticizes purity balls for implying that fathers, rather than young women themselves, have the freedom to control whether and with whom the young women engage in sexual intercourse.

Glamour claims that National Longitudinal Study of Adolescent Health data supports the conclusion that teenagers making virginity pledges, including those promulgated through purity balls, usually do not adhere to the required standard of chastity, and are less prepared to utilize safe sex practices to mitigate the risks when engaging in sexual activity. Furthermore, Glamour states that the percentage of teenagers in a given area who have made virginity pledges is positively correlated with the frequency with which sexually transmitted infections occur. An article in Time magazine says that there is a scientific controversy as to the efficacy of the virginity pledges at purity balls.

Opponents of purity balls claim that they encroach upon women's freedom of choice to date whom they please and to make their own independent decisions without the help of men. In this view, the philosophy of purity balls implies that young girls are not capable of making their own choices. Jennifer Freitag, a Southern Illinois University Carbondale doctoral student, argues that, from a feminist perspective, the purity ball ritual can be considered sexist discrimination as it rarely applies to men, and ignores whether women desire heterosexual marriages. Freitag further asserts that the purity balls and virginity pledges give women fewer opportunities to explore their future mates and presume that the girls will marry men, ignoring lesbianism, bisexuality, and transsexualism. Also, Freitag claims that purity balls have psychological elements of father–daughter incest.

Conservative journalist Betsy Hart supports the idea of sexual abstinence prior to marriage. However, she has expressed concerns that purity balls are pervaded by a preoccupation with physical chastity which may inadvertently imbue the social construction of girls attending them with erotic attributes. She claims that this "sexualizing" shifts attention away from maintenance of the internal moral and spiritual virtue which she believes is required by the tenets of the Christian faith.

== See also ==
- Silver Ring Thing
- Purity ring
- Abstinence-only sex education
- Father-daughter dance
