= Journal of Marriage and Family =

- Discipline: Family studies
- Language: English

Publication details
- Former name(s): Living (1939–1940), Marriage and Family Living (1941–1963)
- History: 1939–present
- Publisher: Wiley-Blackwell on behalf of the National Council on Family Relations (United States)
- Frequency: 5/year
- Impact factor: 6 (2022)

Standard abbreviations
- ISO 4: J. Marriage Fam.

Indexing
- CODEN: JMFAA6
- ISSN: 0022-2445 (print); 1741-3737 (web)
- LCCN: 42051034
- JSTOR: 00222445
- OCLC no.: 01641520

Links
- Journal homepage; Online access; Online archive

The Journal of Marriage and Family is a peer-reviewed academic journal published by Wiley-Blackwell on behalf of the National Council on Family Relations. It was established in 1939 as Living, renamed to Marriage and Family Living in 1941, and obtained its current title in 1964. The journal covers research and theory, research interpretation and reviews, and critical discussion on all aspects of marriage, close relationships, and families.

Journal of Marriage and Family is indexed by Thomson Reuters. According to the Journal Citation Reports, the journal has a 2022 impact factor of 6. Google Scholar ranks it first among journals in Family Studies and 6th among sociology journals.

The current editor-in-chief is Liana C. Sayer (2024).
