= Purity ring =

Ring worn to signal chastity

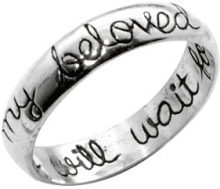
A purity ring made from sterling silver.

Purity rings (also known as promise rings, abstinence rings, or chastity rings) are rings worn as a sign of chastity. Since the 1990s, Christian organizations in the United States used the purity ring as a symbol of commitment. In particular, Catholic and evangelical Christian groups, such as True Love Waits and Silver Ring Thing, promoted virginity pledges and virginity before marriage. Wearing a purity ring is typically accompanied by a religious vow to practice abstinence until marriage. Chastity rings are part of the abstinence-only sex education movement and are intended to act as a physical reminder of the wearer's chastity vow.

== Organizations ==
=== Silver Ring Thing ===
Unaltered, known until 2019 as Silver Ring Thing (SRT), is an American virginity pledge program founded in 1995 by Denny Pattyn. The program encourages teens and young adults to remain sexually abstinent until marriage. For a few years, it was partially funded by the U.S. federal government. Drawing on Christian theology, SRT uses rock/hip hop concert-style events in an attempt to appeal to 21st-century teenagers. During these gatherings, participants commit to a vow of sexual abstinence until marriage by purchasing rings. The organization's theme verse is 1 Thessalonians 4:3–4.

In 2004, SRT began expanding operations into the United Kingdom, with mixed results. While some teenagers in the UK embraced the message of abstinence, some critics rejected and ridiculed SRT, saying it was anti-sex or unrealistic, and that it seemed unlikely that abstinence programs would attract widespread support in the UK because of the UK's differing attitude toward sexuality and sex education. The group's Assistant National Director for the UK, Denise Pfeiffer, said there was a real need for such a movement in the UK to curb what she sees as the ever-increasing rates of sexually transmitted infections and teenage pregnancies, both of which she claims are the highest in Western Europe.

In 2005, the ACLU of Massachusetts sued the U.S. Department of Health and Human Services because it believed SRT used tax dollars to promote Christianity. SRT presented a two-part programme: the first part about abstinence, the second about Christianity's role in abstinence. The ACLU claimed federal funding given to this program violated the separation of church and state. On August 22, 2005, the Department suspended SRT's US$75,000 federal grant until it submitted a "corrective action plan". In 2006, a corrective action plan was accepted by the department. The lawsuit was dismissed, and SRT received federal funding.

In a 2007 case in England, R (Playfoot) v Millais School Governing Body, 16-year-old student Lydia Playfoot alleged that her school had violated her rights by forbidding the wearing of a purity ring. The case was funded by the group Christian Concern. On July 16, 2007, the High Court ruled that Playfoot's human rights were not violated. Her father, Phil Playfoot, was the British pastor for Silver Ring Thing at the time, and was ordered to pay £12,000 towards the school's costs.

In 2019, Silver Ring Thing changed its name to Unaltered.

=== True Love Waits ===
True Love Waits (TLW) is an international Christian group that promotes sexual abstinence outside of marriage for teenagers and college students. TLW was created in April 1993 by the Southern Baptists, and is sponsored by LifeWay Christian Resources. It is based on conservative Christian views of human sexuality.

==== Pledge ====
The True Love Waits pledge states: "Believing that true love waits, I make a commitment to God, myself, my family, my friends, my future mate and my future children to be sexually abstinent from this day until the day I enter a biblical marriage relationship." In addition, they promote sexual purity, which encompasses not only abstaining from intercourse before marriage, but also abstaining from "sexual thoughts, sexual touching, pornography, and actions that are known to lead to sexual arousal."

By the late 1990s, Christian music groups were promoting the program, and events similar to youth rallies were held at Christian music concerts, providing an opportunity for adolescents to sign pledge cards.

==== Effect ====
In the first year of the campaign, over 102,000 young people signed the pledge, which was also taken up by other church groups including the Roman Catholic Church and Assemblies of God. The campaign spread across the US, making the use of occasions such as Valentine's Day to gain attention.

By 2004, groups supporting abstinence numbered in the hundreds. During the preceding decade, approximately 2.5 million American youth took the pledge of abstinence.

== Supporters ==
Various individuals advocate for purity rings, or have previously advocated for them.

- BarlowGirl
- Miley Cyrus
- Selena Gomez
- Group 1 Crew
  - Blanca
- Jonas Brothers
- Demi Lovato
- Stacie Orrico
- Rebecca St. James
- Jessica Simpson
- Jordin Sparks

== Criticism ==
Some studies of the efficacy of virginity pledges have found they may be effective in delaying vaginal intercourse but ineffective in reducing the rate of sexually transmitted infection. They also reduce the likelihood of contraceptive use. Additionally, it has been reported that pledgers replace vaginal intercourse with other sexual activities, such as oral or anal sex, thinking they "don't count". At least one study has found no difference in the sexual behavior of pledgers and non-pledgers after controlling for pre-existing differences between the groups.

David Bario of the Columbia News Service wrote:

Under the Bush administration, organizations that promote abstinence and encourage teens to sign virginity pledges or wear purity rings have received federal grants. The Silver Ring Thing, a subsidiary of a Pennsylvania evangelical church, has received more than $1 million from the government to promote abstinence and to sell its rings in the United States and abroad.

According to a study conducted by Peter Bearman and Hannah Brückner published in 2005 in the Journal of Adolescent Health, 21% of young adults who had taken the pledge had vaginal intercourse, 13% reported having practiced oral sex and 4% anal sex. In the 2011 book Making Chastity Sexy: The Rhetoric of Evangelical Abstinence Campaigns, Christine Gardner criticizes True Love Waits for "using sex to sell abstinence" by promising more satisfying sexual activity within marriage for those who abstain from premarital sex; she argues that this rhetoric reinforces selfish desires for gratification, sets people up for divorce and dissatisfaction with marriage, and simply adapts "secular forms for religious ends". In 2014, Jimmy Hester, one of the main founders of the program, said that although some studies have shown that many young Christians have broken their commitments, it has served as a benchmark for some who have returned to the faith.

The Jonas Brothers made an abstinence pledge through True Love Waits as teens. The band and pledge are satirized in the 2009 South Park episode "The Ring". In 2013, Morgan Lee, a journalist of The Christian Post, conducted an interview with Joe Jonas and wrote:

In an exceptionally raw and frank interview, Jonas also mentioned that although he had made a good-faith, preteen, commitment with Christian abstinence organization True Love Waits to keep his virginity until marriage and donned a "purity ring" as an 11-year-old, he was overwhelmed when this became the focus of media attention when the band started to blow up.

In 2019, the Lutheran minister Nadia Bolz-Weber called for people to send her their unwanted purity rings so that she could cast them into a sculpture of a vagina. Apologetic minister Alisa Childers criticized Bolz-Weber for her project, but acknowledged that purity ring campaigns needed to improve.

== See also ==
- Celibacy
- CTR ring
- Fornication
- Purity ball
- Virginity pledge
