= Don Raunikar =

American writer (1959–2004)

- Born: Donald Fred Raunikar; September 19, 1959 (age 67)
- Died: January 26, 2004 (aged 44); Houston
- Citizenship: United States
- Occupation: Psychotherapist
- Spouse: Kimberley Raunikar
- Writing career
- Language: English
- Notable work: Choosing God's Best

Dr. Donald Fred Raunikar (19 September 1959 - 26 January 2004) was an American psychoanalyst, Christian writer, and advocate of Biblical courtship from Houston, Texas.

== Career ==
Raunikar was an American psychoanalyst from Houston, Texas. He was a Baptist and was married to Kim Raunikar. He was the director of New Life Clinics, where he practices psychotherapy, and he was in charge of Lifehouse, a crisis pregnancy center.

== Biblical courtship advocacy ==
Raunikar advised singles not to engage in dating but instead to engage in Biblical courtship, which he defined as an interpersonal relationship that honors God and in which both people's actions have the clear goal of pursuing marriage. He wrote the book Choosing God's Best: Wisdom for Lifelong Romance, which was published in 1998. In this book, Raunikar wrote that waiting for God's plan to unfold requires courage and faith. Belinda Elliott of the Christian Broadcasting Network called Choosing God's Best her favorite book on Christian romance and dating. In the book The Invisible Bond: How to Break Free from Your Sexual Past, Barbara Wilson writes that Choosing God's Best "resonated with [her] like none other" of the "many books on dating" she had read. In the journal Critical Research on Religion, Courtney Ann Irby of Loyola University Chicago writes about the similarities between Choosing God's Best and other Evangelical books about premarital romantic relationships, such as Dannah Gresh's And the Bride Wore White, Elisabeth Elliot's Passion and Purity and Quest for Love, Eric and Leslie Ludy's When God Writes Your Love Story, Ben Young's and Sam Adams' The Ten Commandments of Dating, Henry Cloud's and John Townsend's Boundaries in Dating, Alex Chediak's 5 Paths to the Love of Your Life, and Joshua Harris's I Kissed Dating Goodbye and Boy Meets Girl.
