= When God Writes Your Love Story =

1999 book

When God Writes Your Love Story: The Ultimate Approach to Guy/Girl Relationships
- First edition cover
- Authors: Eric and Leslie Ludy
- Cover artist: Martin French
- Language: English
- Subject: Christian views on marriage; Dating; Personal relationship with God; Premarital sex; Sexual abstinence
- Genre: Christian devotional literature
- Published: 1999 (Loyal Publishing); 2004 (Multnomah Books); 2009 (Multnomah Books)
- Publication place: United States
- Media type: Print
- Pages: 240
- ISBN: 1929125003
- OCLC: 52845804
- Dewey Decimal: 241/.6765
- LC Class: BV4531.2 .L835 1999

When God Writes Your Love Story: The Ultimate Approach to Guy/Girl Relationships is a 1999 book by Eric and Leslie Ludy, an American married couple. After becoming a bestseller on the Christian book market, the book was republished in 2004 and then revised and expanded in 2009. It tells the story of the authors' first meeting, courtship, and marriage. The authors advise single people not to be physically or emotionally intimate with others, but to wait for the spouse that God has planned for them. The first edition was packaged with a CD single by the Ludys: "Faithfully", a song they had written specifically to accompany the book.

The book is divided into five sections and sixteen chapters. Each chapter is written from the perspective of one of the two authors; nine are by Eric, while Leslie wrote seven, as well as the introduction. The Ludys argue that one's love life should be both guided by and subordinate to one's relationship with God. Leslie writes that God offers new beginnings to formerly unchaste or sexually abused individuals.

Other American Christian authors, such as Mark Matlock and Jason Evert, wrote highly of When God Writes Your Love Story. Leah Andrews of the Lewiston Morning Tribune compared When God Writes Your Love Story to other popular Christian books providing alternatives to dating, including Joshua Harris's I Kissed Dating Goodbye and Boy Meets Girl. Eastern University Christian studies professors Margaret and Dwight Peterson responded to the Ludys' book by writing an essay called "God Does Not Want to Write Your Love Story," in which the Petersons argue that the book makes young people see marriage as a fantasy comparable to that of Disney Princesses, and that this fantasy often results in disappointment. Rick Holland, an instructor at The Master's College and Seminary and pastor of College and Student Ministries at Grace Community Church, criticized the Ludys' description of dating, claiming it was based too much on anecdotes and not enough on the Bible.

== Background ==
When God Writes Your Love Story, first published in the United States in 1999, is the third book written by Eric and Leslie Ludy, an American married couple. Like the Ludys' previous two books, His Perfect Faithfulness: The Story of our Courtship (1996) and Romance God's Way (1997), its major themes are romance and Christianity; it tells the story of the authors' first meeting, courtship, and marriage. After becoming a bestseller on the Christian book market, When God Writes Your Love Story was republished in 2004 and then revised and expanded in 2009. More than 350,000 copies were sold worldwide by 2009. Translations of the book have been published in Spanish, German, and Traditional Chinese.

Eric and Leslie Ludy met when Eric was 21 and Leslie was 16. They pursued a friendship for several months before starting to court, and married in December 1994, the same month that Eric turned 24. In When God Writes Your Love Story, the Ludys advise single people not to be physically or emotionally intimate with others, but to wait for the life partner that God has planned for them; the Ludys suggest that one should marry this person rather than independently choosing a mate. Also focusing on premarital physical and emotional purity, the authors do not discuss the physical processes of sexual activity. Like many other Christian books about premarital romantic relationships, the Ludys' book explicitly does not present a set of rules to follow or a strategy for romantic success, but rather gives readers a framework for pursuing Christian romantic relationships; the book is intended to be a tool in the creation of the reader's unique romantic relationship rather than as a blueprint explaining what all Christian romantic relationships are supposed to look like.

Before the book's release, it was endorsed by Leslie and Les Parrott, authors of Saving Your Marriage Before It Starts; Beverly LaHaye of Concerned Women for America; and Joe White, President of Kanakuk Kamps. The first edition was packaged with a CD single by the Ludys: "Faithfully", a song they had written specifically to accompany the book, with lyrics discussing the beauty of having a life partner.

== Content ==
The book is divided into five sections and sixteen chapters. Each chapter is written from the perspective of one of the two authors; nine are by Eric, while Leslie writes seven, as well as the introduction. The first section, "Desiring a Love Story", addresses sexual desire and lovesickness, suggesting that temporary relationships cannot fulfill those longings. Section Two, "Preparing for a Love Story", advances ways in which one might, before initiating a romantic relationship, develop the characteristics of a good spouse. The next section, "Waiting for a Love Story", discusses the practice of fidelity to one's future spouse before meeting them by way of sexual abstinence and argues that waiting indefinitely is worth it even if one's soulmate never arrives. In the fourth section, "Sweetening a Love Story", the Ludys provide advice on how to proceed once the possibility of a romantic relationship has presented itself. The final section, "Discovering a God-written Love Story", argues that it is never too late to give God control of one's love life, and that this sacrifice should be made not in expectation of personal benefit but rather to benefit one's future spouse and to honor God.

Early in the book, Eric retells a portion of Homer's Odyssey, describing the episode in which Ulysses sails near the land of the Sirens: creatures whose song so attracts seafarers that they sail towards them and crash on the rocks. In this story, Ulysses orders all his men to fill their ears with beeswax and then tie him to the mast; the ship therefore sails through the area unharmed. Still, Ulysses, hearing the Sirens' song the entire time, is tortured by its beauty and his inability to get to the song's source. Eric follows this story with a retelling of the story of Orpheus's encounter with the Sirens. In this story, Orpheus's solution is to play a "sweeter song" than that of the Sirens; his ship also passes unharmed, his men so entranced by his song that they do not notice the Sirens. Eric then argues from analogy that, normally, those who force themselves to resist premarital sexual and romantic temptations are likely to find the process torturous (like Ulysses), while those who listen to the plans God has for them find waiting for marriage much easier (as it was for Orpheus's crew). Eric expands on the concept of the "sweeter song" throughout the book and often refers to it. Another frequently mentioned concept in the book is "the beautiful side of love"; the Ludys use this phrase to refer to a lasting, satisfying romance and contrast this state with such other experiences as breakups, unrequited love, and sexual frustration.

The Ludys argue that one's love life should be both guided by and subordinate to one's relationship with God. They suggest that, "if God's plan and purpose for you is marriage, then the person you will one day marry ... is alive and wandering the earth" and that this knowledge should encourage people to act in such a way that their future spouses would be pleased. The Ludys contest the definition of "true love" as an emotion; instead, they define "true love" as the choice to commit to another person no matter what happens. Eric writes that "there are two ways each of us can approach life: spending our days meeting our needs or looking for ways to meet others' needs. The mystery is that when we spend our life focused on our own needs, we are never satisfied ... but when we pour out our life and focus on how we can serve others ... our deepest needs are met as well!"

Leslie argues that non-permanent relationships involving physical or emotional intimacy (or both) result in long-term psychological pain and that one should therefore only become physically or emotionally intimate with one's spouse. Eric retells the Greek myth of the suitors of Penelope, in which Penelope, whose husband Ulysses is erroneously believed to be dead, resists a large number of marriage proposals until Ulysses returns and kills the suitors. Eric uses the story to suggest that one should be faithful to one's future spouse even if it appears that they will never arrive. Eric argues that selfless service is an important part of marriage. He therefore suggests that a good way for a man to make himself ready for his future spouse is to serve his mother and sisters, and that single women should practice serving their fathers and brothers. Leslie writes that she is commonly asked the question "How will I know when a relationship is from God?" and her response is that people are likelier to recognize that a relationship is from God when they have a "team ... made up of godly people who can keep us accountable to our commitments, pray with us, and provide a refreshing outside perspective." She indicates that this team should include one's parents or, if one does not have living Christian parents, other Christians of an older generation. She writes that God offers new beginnings to formerly unchaste or sexually abused individuals.

== Critical response ==
=== Discussions of context ===
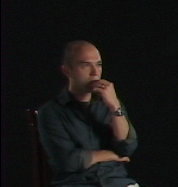
When God Writes Your Love Story is often compared to books by Joshua Harris (pictured), such as I Kissed Dating Goodbye and Boy Meets Girl.

When God Writes Your Love Story is a popular Christian book that provides alternatives to dating. For this reason, Leah Andrews of the Lewiston Morning Tribune compared the book to Joshua Harris's I Kissed Dating Goodbye and Boy Meets Girl. When God Writes Your Love Story also contains Evangelical sexual abstinence teachings. Christine Gardner, a communications professor at Wheaton College, investigates such teachings in Making Chastity Sexy: The Rhetoric of Evangelical Abstinence Campaigns, and discusses the Ludys' book as part of this investigation. Gardner writes that she interviewed a twenty-two-year-old woman who had read When God Writes Your Love Story and "desperately wanted God to write her love story, but she thought that she would help him out by filling in the blanks." Gardner argues that the result "was a fractured fairy tale, one without a happy ending."

In the journal Critical Research on Religion, Courtney Ann Irby of Loyola University Chicago writes that the Ludys disparage secular American culture as overtly sexual and thus an obstacle to Christians. According to Irby, secular beliefs about dating are negatively presented in When God Writes Your Love Story and hookup culture is consistently discussed, although Irby indicates that, since the publication of the Ludys' book, some scholars have disputed the prevalence of casual sex in the United States. Irby suggests that the Ludys have no discernible qualifications to speak on the issues they discuss, but rather justify their message by emphasising their own personal experience as the reason for their authority. She writes that the Ludys recognize their lack of expertise and therefore emphasize trusting God as being more important than learning from the specific stories in the book. Irby suggests that the Ludys' book is, in these respects, similar to many other Evangelical books about premarital romantic relationships, such as Dannah Gresh's And the Bride Wore White, Elisabeth Elliot's Passion and Purity and Quest for Love, Don Raunikar's Choosing God's Best, Ben Young's and Sam Adams' The Ten Commandments of Dating, Henry Cloud's and John Townsend's Boundaries in Dating, Alex Chediak's 5 Paths to the Love of Your Life, and Joshua Harris's I Kissed Dating Goodbye and Boy Meets Girl.

=== Christian responses to the book's advice ===
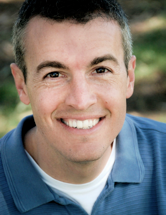
Because Eric (pictured) and Leslie Ludy were 21 and 16 respectively when they first met, English professors Christine A. Colón and Bonnie E. Field suggest that older singles are unlikely to gather hope from their story.

Christine A. Colón and Bonnie E. Field, two single women in their thirties, expressed their frustrations with the Ludys' book in Singled Out: Why Celibacy Must Be Reinvented in Today's Church. Colón, an English professor at Wheaton College; and Field, a former English professor at Wayland Baptist University, criticize Leslie Ludy's account of her own wait for God to bring her a romantic partner. They argue that "the language Ludy uses to describe her time of waiting and trusting implies a difficult and long struggle that is finally rewarded by God" and suggests that a long wait results in an even greater reward, a concept that Colón and Field, despite acknowledging as commonplace, disagree with and trace back to William Shakespeare's Cymbeline, which states "the more delay'd, delighted." Singled Out suggests that, because Leslie was only 16 when she met Eric, her story is unlikely to inspire hope in older singles.

Colón and Field compare When God Writes Your Love Story to Derek Prince's God Is a Matchmaker, and argue that Prince's book better expresses the concept that God allows some people to receive their soulmates quickly, while requiring others to undergo a long wait. While the Ludys' book suggests that it is worth waiting for a soulmate because the wait indicates a better prize, Colón and Field favour Prince's reasons for advocating waiting for one's soulmate, which are that doing so tests one's faith and that "God has required many of His choicest servants to wait long periods for the fulfillment of His promise or purpose."

Margaret and Dwight Peterson, an American married couple who are Christian Studies professors at Eastern University, teach a course together called "Christian Marriage" and were very critical of When God Writes Your Love Story. They responded to the Ludys' book by writing an essay called "God Does Not Want to Write Your Love Story." They write therein that, while they read When God Writes Your Love Story, "it began to dawn on us with particular clarity how different these stories of romance are from any traditionally Christian understanding of marriage." In response to Leslie Ludy's recommendation that a single woman should seek to be God's princess until becoming the princess of a human prince, the Petersons argue that this analogy makes young people see marriage as a fantasy comparable to that of Disney Princesses, and that this fantasy often results in disappointment. While referencing When God Writes Your Love Story specifically on several occasions, the Petersons acknowledge that the Ludys' book is one of many books with this premise and write that "it is the entire genre that is problematic."

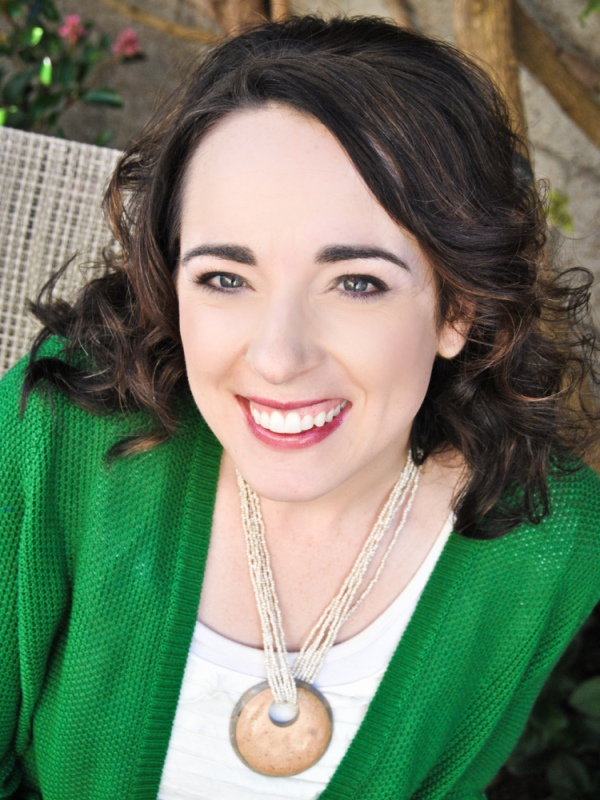
Leslie Ludy (pictured) writes that it is important to listen intently and regularly to God's voice when seeking discernment about romantic relationships, and Catholic author Jason Evert commends her on this assertion.

Rick Holland, an instructor at The Master's College and Seminary and pastor of College and Student Ministries at Grace Community Church, criticized the Ludys' description of dating, claiming it was based too much on anecdotes and not enough on the Bible. Nonetheless, he commended the couple on the relevant Bible verses they do quote and he argued that the advice the Ludys share in the book is sound and that their story is an encouraging one.

When God Writes Your Love Story was received positively by some American Christian authors. In Freshman: The College Student's Guide to Developing Wisdom, Mark Matlock, an ordained minister and youth pastor recommends When God Writes Your Love Story to college students. He describes the Ludys' book as funny, honest, and candid. Jason Evert, a Catholic author and chastity speaker, wrote positively of When God Writes Your Love Story in his book If You Really Loved Me: 100 Questions on Dating, Relationships, and Sexual Purity. Evert commends Leslie Ludy writing about the importance of listening intently and regularly to God's voice in seeking discernment about romantic relationships. Also in If You Really Loved Me, Evert praises a passage from When God Writes Your Love Story in which Leslie Ludy recalls having spoken with a group of young men who all agreed that the most desirable women were those who were slow to establish strong emotional attachments to potential romantic partners, and that the least desirable women were those who were emotionally promiscuous. According to Evert, these men are right; he uses the passage to support his argument that lack of sexual experience is attractive.

Commentators have also noted the song "Faithfully" that accompanied the book. The Petersons criticized it, arguing that its lyrics suggest that singles should seek a kind of unachievable perfection in their future marriage and spouse. On the other hand, in Eyes Wide Open: Avoiding the Heartbreak of Emotional Promiscuity, Brienne Murk, a Christian musician and public speaker, identifies "Faithfully" as one of her favourite songs.

In 22 and Single: A Coming of Age Story, Katie Kiesler wrote that, after reading the first chapter of When God Writes Your Love Story, she stopped because "it was too hard to hear about the wonderful way in which God brought another perfect couple together — because it wasn't happening for me." She wrote that her friends kept recommending the book to her, even after she had tried starting it. She eventually decided that the reason she didn't like the book was her own selfishness in seeking to fulfill her own desires rather than leaving her desires for God to work out. She then read the book again, and wrote that God used her reading of it to make her thankful for her time as a single person. She also wrote that she found the book to be "mostly about letting God's love overflow into all areas of your life rather than tales of perfect Christian couples."

In 2012, Clear Choices Pregnancy Resources Center, an American pro-life crisis pregnancy center operated by Christians in Grayson County, Kentucky, offered a course on the topic of sexual integrity that employed When God Writes Your Love Story and two other Christian books as its basis, the other two being Gary Chapman's The Five Love Languages and Bill and Pam Farrel's Single Men Are Like Waffles — Single Women Are Like Spaghetti.

== Bibliography ==
- Colón, Christine A.; Bonnie E. Field (2009). Singled Out: Why Celibacy Must Be Reinvented in Today's Church. Grand Rapids, Michigan: Brazos Press. ISBN 978-1441204288.
- DeMoss, Nancy Leigh; Dannah Gresh (2007). Lies Women Believe: And the Truth that Sets Them Free. Moody Publishers. ISBN 978-0802479532.
- Evert, Jason (2003). If You Really Loved Me: 100 Questions on Dating, Relationships, and Sexual Purity. Ann Arbor, Michigan: Charis Books. ISBN 1569553696.
- Gardner, Christine J. (2011). Making Chastity Sexy: The Rhetoric of Evangelical Abstinence Campaigns. Berkeley, California: University of California Press. ISBN 978-0520267275.
- Holland, Rick (2005). Alex Chediak (ed.). "The Guided Path". 5 Paths to the Love of Your Life: Defining Your Dating Style. NavPress: 89–121. ISBN 9781576837092.
- Irby, Courtney Ann (2013). "'We didn't call it dating': The disrupted landscape of relationship advice for evangelical Protestant youth". Critical Research on Religion. 1 (2): 177–194. doi:10.1177/2050303213490041. S2CID 147411642.
- Kiesler, Katie (2012). 22 and Single: A Coming of Age Story. WestBow Press. ISBN 978-1449756475.
- Ludy, Eric; Leslie Ludy (1996). His Perfect Faithfulness: The Story of our Courtship. Harcourt. ISBN 1881189058.
- Ludy, Eric; Leslie Ludy (1997). Romance God's Way. Makarios Publishing. ISBN 0965625109.
- Ludy, Eric; Leslie Ludy (1999). When God Writes Your Love Story: The Ultimate Approach to Guy/Girl Relationships. Sisters, Oregon: Loyal Publishing. ISBN 1929125003.
- Ludy, Eric; Leslie Ludy (2005). Teaching True Love to a Sex-at-13 Generation. Thomas Nelson. ISBN 1418552860.
- Ludy, Eric; Leslie Ludy (2005). Wenn Gott deine Liebesgeschichte schreibt (in German). Gerth Medien. ISBN 3894379952.
- Ludy, Eric; Leslie Ludy (2006). A Perfect Wedding. Harvest House. ISBN 0736935177.
- Ludy, Eric; Leslie Ludy (2006). Cuando Dios Escribe Tu Historia de Amor (in Spanish). Thomas Nelson. ISBN 0881139939.
- Ludy, Eric; Leslie Ludy (2007). 上帝也寫羅曼史 (in Chinese). Campus Evangelical Fellowship Press. ISBN 978-9575879907.
- Ludy, Eric; Leslie Ludy (2009). When God Writes Your Love Story: The Ultimate Guide to Guy/Girl Relationships (Revised ed.). Colorado Springs, Colorado: Multnomah Books. ISBN 9781601422422.
- Matlock, Mark (2005). Freshman: The College Student's Guide to Developing Wisdom. Colorado Springs, Colorado: NavPress. ISBN 1576837297.
- Murk, Brienne (2011). Eyes Wide Open: Avoiding the Heartbreak of Emotional Promiscuity. Gospel Light Publications. ISBN 978-0830748433.
- Peterson, Margaret Kim; Dwight N. Peterson (2009). D. Brent Laytham (ed.). "God Does Not Want to Write Your Love Story". God Does Not ...: Entertain, Play Matchmaker, Hurry, Demand Blood, Cure Every Illness. Brazos Press. ISBN 978-1441203892.
- Raunikar, Don (2000). Choosing God's Best: Wisdom for Lifelong Romance. Random House. ISBN 1576735672.
