= Ludy =

Ludy is a surname and a given name. Notable people with the name include:

Given name:

- Ludy T. Benjamin (born 1945), American psychologist & historian of psychology
- Ludy Godbold (1900–1981), American track and field athlete
- Ludy Kissassunda (1932–2021), Angolan general and politician
- Ludy Langer (1893–1984), American competition swimmer and world record holder
- Ludy Pudluk (1943–2019), Canadian territorial level politician and cabinet minister

Surname:

- Adam Edward Ludy (1831–1910), American Civil War veteran
- Eric Ludy (born 1970), author, speaker, president of Ellerslie Mission Society
- Franz Josef Ludy (born 1933), German serial killer who killed four people
- Leslie Ludy (born 1975), American Christian author, speaker, and editor
- Salomao Ludy (born 2002), Angolan professional footballer
