= Boy Meets Girl: Say Hello to Courtship =

- Author: Joshua Harris
- Language: English
- Subject: Courtship
- Publisher: Multnomah
- Publication place: United States
- ISBN: 1576737098

Boy Meets Girl: Say Hello to Courtship is a 2000 book by Joshua Harris. It is the sequel to I Kissed Dating Goodbye. In Boy Meets Girl, Harris describes his personal experiences courting the woman he eventually married. The book argues that psychological pain and trauma can result from entering an intimate relationship before one is ready, either emotionally or financially, to commit to being the other person's life partner. Harris has written several other books, including I Kissed Dating Goodbye, Sex Is Not the Problem (Lust Is), and Stop Dating the Church.

Boy Meets Girl did not receive as much critical attention as I Kissed Dating Goodbye. Leah Andrews of the Lewiston Morning Tribune compared Boy Meets Girl to Eric and Leslie Ludy's When God Writes Your Love Story, suggesting that both texts are popular Christian books providing alternatives to dating. Andrew Dalton of the Legion of Christ wrote that he was partway through reading Anthony Bannon's Peter on the Shore when he became distracted with Boy Meets Girl. In 2000, Rebecca St. James anticipated using her song "Wait for Me" to promote Boy Meets Girl.

Margaret and Dwight Peterson, an American married couple and Christian Studies professors at Eastern University, wrote an essay called "God Does Not Want to Write Your Love Story" in which they criticized Boy Meets Girl, among other books. In this essay, the Petersons expressed "how different these stories of romance are from any traditionally Christian understanding of marriage."
