= Christian courtship =

Courtship in traditional Christianity

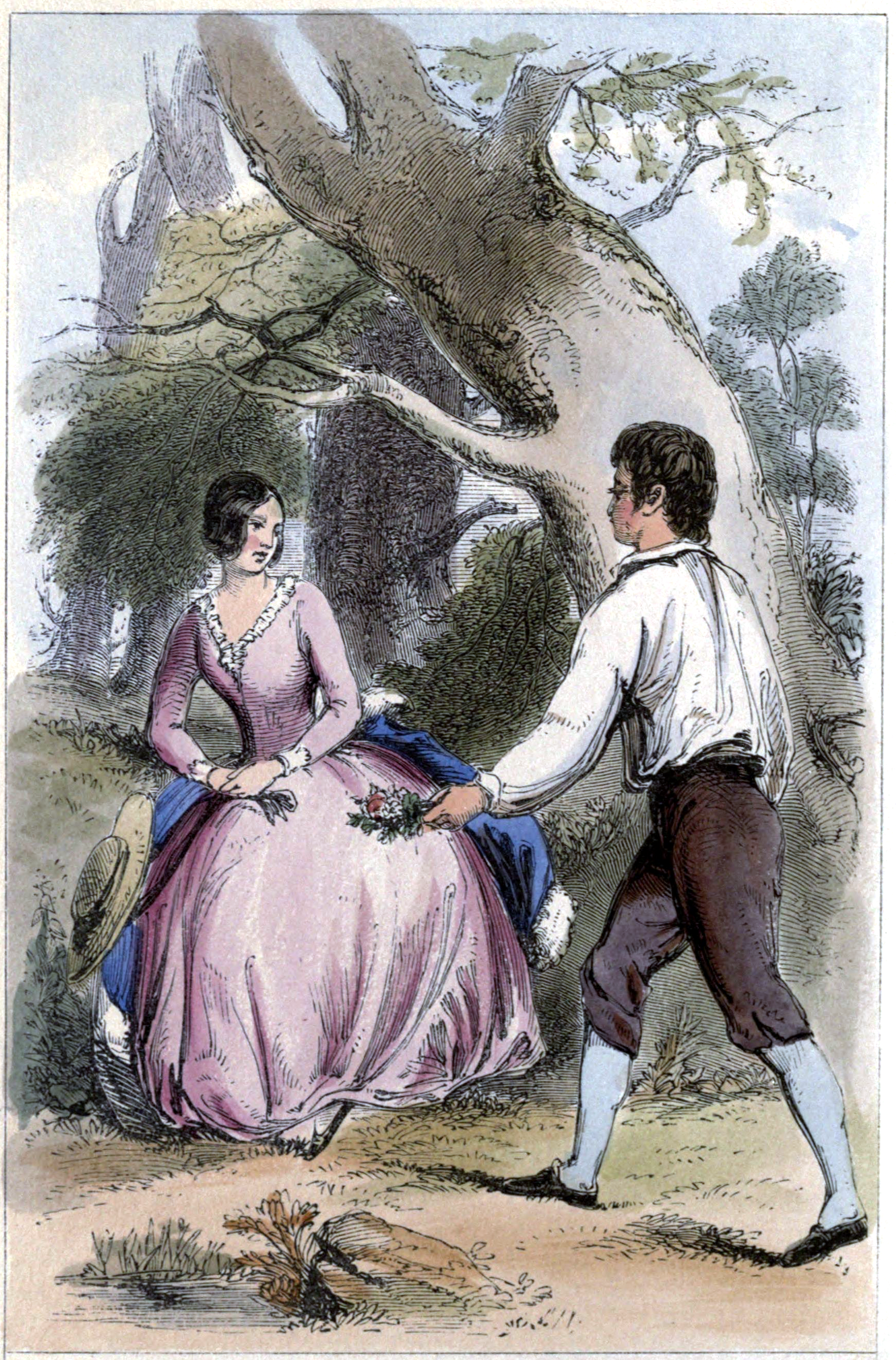
In traditional forms of Christianity, courtship follows a betrothal and concludes with the celebration of marriage.

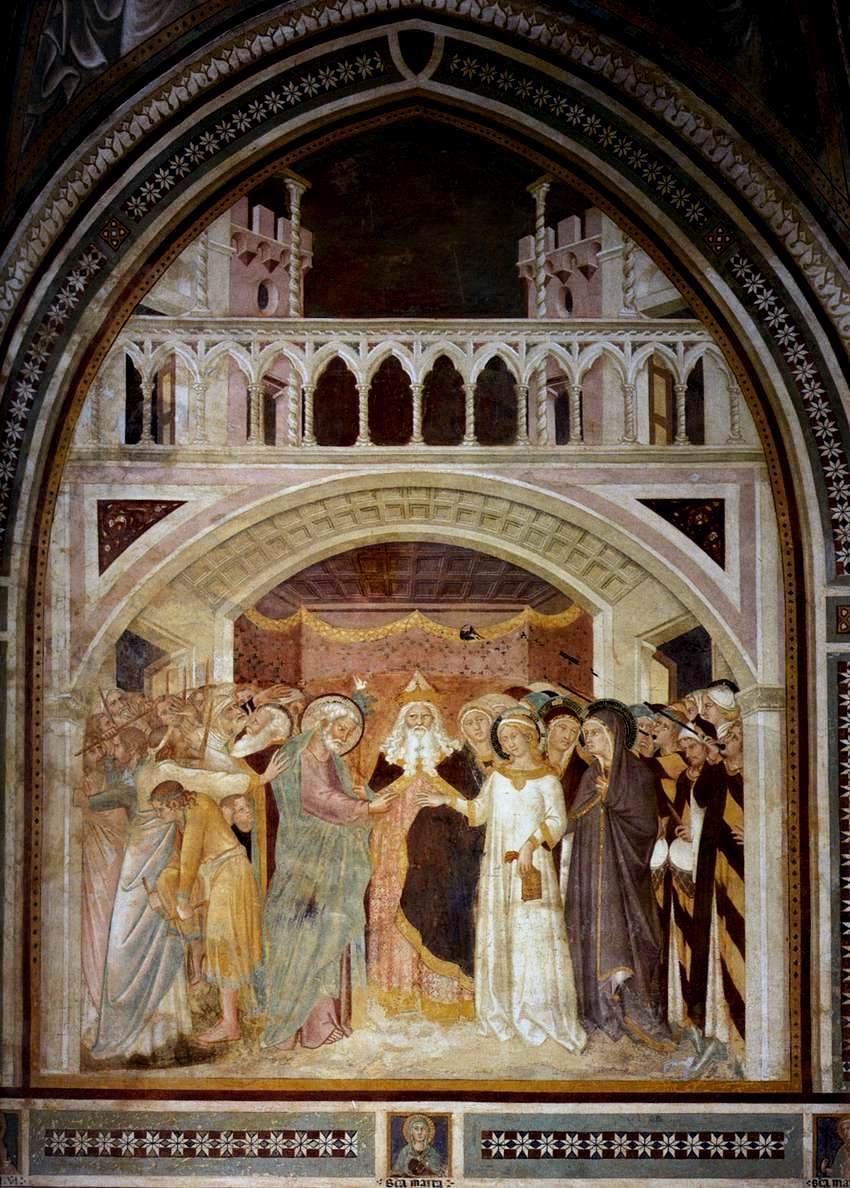
Christian art depicting the betrothal of Joseph the Carpenter and the Virgin Mary

Christian courtship, also known as Biblical courtship, is the traditional Christian practice of individuals in approaching "the prospect of marriage". Preceded by a proposal, courtship traditionally begins after a betrothal and concludes with the celebration of marriage (though in the present-day, courtship may precede the betrothal, which is then followed by the wedding). Christian theologian Scott Croft distinguished courtship from dating, teaching that:

Courtship ordinarily begins when a single man approaches a single woman by going through the woman's father, and then conducts his relationship with the woman under the authority of her father, family, or church, whichever is most appropriate. Courtship always has marriage as its direct goal... Dating, a more modern approach, begins when either the man or the woman initiates a more-than-friends relationship with the other, and then they conduct that relationship outside of any oversight or authority. Dating may or may not have marriage as its goal.

Andre Marie, a brother of the Slaves of the Immaculate Heart of Mary, discusses that courtship allows a couple to become acquainted with one another, and that physical intimacy is saved only for those in wedlock. Christian minister Patricia Bootsma further delineates this distinction, writing that in contrast to the modern conception of dating, in "courtship, time together in groups with family or friends is encouraged, and there is oversight by and accountability to parents or mentors". She further states that with courtship, "commitment happens before intimacy".

Christian courtship remains normative in certain Christian countries such as Guatemala, in which much of the population belongs to the Roman Catholic Church, as well as communities of Conservative Anabaptism, such as the Apostolic Christian Church. Various congregations of Christian denominations hold events, such as singings for young adults, that allow young adults to meet one another. In the United States, courtship is seen as a response to secular dating culture in which various Christian communities might find themselves, c. 1985 to present. Motivated by concern for the need of Christian values in contrast to secular dating practices, conservative Christians identified what they saw as key Biblical principles for courtship and romance, and began to disseminate them in the 1980s.

The practice of traditional Christian courtship among church members belonging to various Christian denominations experienced a revival in the 1980s. Keynote speaker and author Dr. S.M. Davis developed a unique stand on this philosophy, and his materials have been popular with the homeschool culture since the early 1990s. Proponents of courtship say that it is identified by Biblical principles, rather than particular methods or behavioural practices. These principles have been summarized in Leave Dating Behind: a Road Map to Marriage by Christina Rogers within the acronym CARE:

- Commitment to marriage
- Accountability
- Rejection of the secular dating philosophy
- Establishing physical boundaries (Song of Songs 2:7)

== Characteristics of traditional Christian courtship ==
- The guardianship responsibility of fathers over single daughters.
- The responsibility of parents to prepare their children for marriage in all respects, and for youths to be prepared in terms of talents, education, vocation and finances prior to seeking a courtship relationship.
- The mentoring role of parents or other suitable "accountability couples" in a given courtship.
- Supervision of courtships to mitigate temptations or abuse, whether of a sexual, emotional or financial nature.
- Emphasis of the importance of marriage as an opportunity for Christian service rather than a selfish endeavor.
- Emphasis of the importance of singleness before marriage as a time for greater Christian service in the community, rather than a time to be employed in selfish pursuits.
- Emphasis of the importance of counsel and evaluation by family and friends as a relationship progresses. (Song of Songs 1:4)
- Emphasis of the importance of honesty and getting to know one another as real people in "normal life" during courtship (as contrasted with the dating habit of meeting during special events and entertainment while on one's best behavior.)
- The maintenance of sexual purity in accordance with the evangelical counsel of chastity.

== See also ==
- Espousals of the Blessed Virgin Mary
- Quiverfull
- When God Writes Your Love Story by Eric Ludy and Leslie Ludy
