= Gregg Harris =

American homeschooling advocate

Gregg Eugene Harris (born November 23, 1952) is an American Christian businessman who was a major figure in the Christian homeschooling movement from 1981 through the mid-1990s.

== Career ==
Harris served as a teaching elder at Gresham Household of Faith, which was an experiment in local church reform. According to the Home School Legal Defense Association, his work helped launch the Christian homeschooling movement in the United States, Canada, Australia and Mexico. Over 180,000 families attended his seminars. His book The Christian Home School was a Christian Booksellers Association best seller in March 1988. The list was published by the CBA and was on file in the offices of Noble Institute.

Harris was also the director of the Noble Institute, a non-profit educational organization. From 2017 to 2020, Harris was the owner and proprietor of Roosevelt's Terrariums in Portland, Oregon. He later started a new terrarium shop, Silver Falls Terrarium.

== Delight-directed study ==
One of the main ideas promoted by Gregg Harris is the principle of delight-directed study. This is the basis of Harris's homeschool, child training, and church reform activities.

Harris bases this principle on Psalm 111:2, "Great are the works of the LORD, they are pondered by all who delight in them." He reasons that because God is good, everything that is necessary for human life is also a source of pleasure. It is when the pleasures of God are separated from the purposes of God for those pleasures that an activity becomes sinful, "God dishonoring", and self-destructive.

Harris interprets this principle to state that boredom is the absence of learning (or mental hunger) and loneliness the absence of social connectedness (or social hunger). Therefore, education and study, for good or ill, is nurtured best through what he calls the "power of companionship" among "fellow enthusiasts". All of these ideas are laid out in his various seminars and workshops as described on the blog of Noble Institute.

According to his principle, many social ills are actually the negative consequences of delight-directed study among foolish, often age-segregated people, (e.g. drug abuse and gang membership), while many of the greatest human accomplishments are the consequence of delight-directed study among wise, age-integrated fellow enthusiasts (e.g. in science clubs, hobby groups and other affinity groups). Harris argues that this is why academic and hobby clubs are often more effective than classes offered on the same subjects. The social forces in a classroom are often at odds with its very purpose, whereas the social forces in a well-run club are more supportive of excellence in the topic of interest to the club.

== Personal life ==
Some of Gregg Harris's seven children have gained recognition. His oldest son Joshua Harris is a former pastor and author of I Kissed Dating Goodbye. His twin sons, Alex and Brett Harris (born in 1989), are founders of The Rebelution, a Christian teen website and authors of the book Do Hard Things': A Teenage Rebellion Against Low Expectations.

In addition to his seven children, Gregg Harris has 6 step-children and 19 grandchildren. Gregg's wife, Sono, died on July 4, 2010, after a short battle with cancer. Gregg and Sono's three younger children Sarah, Isaac, and Wren live in Gresham, Oregon.

In 2019, Gregg Harris married Bonnie Schmitt Harris. The couple now live in Silverton, Oregon. The two also started on a new ministry project, The Noble Inn in Silverton, Oregon.

== Controversy ==
In 1995 Harris was one of several named in an anti-trust suit by Cheryl Lindsey Seelhoff. Seelhoff's business, which promoted home education and traditional family life, had suffered when her involvement with a man other than her husband became known. After her divorce and remarriage to this man, she brought suit against a number of homeschooling leaders for various causes of action including defamation, slander, intentional infliction of emotional distress, intentional interference with commerce, and violation of the Sherman Antitrust Act. Seelhoff mentioned Harris in her original complaint. Harris' insurance company settled out of court before legal proceedings began.

== Bibliography ==
- "Delight-Directed Study".
- Harris, Gregg (1988). The Christian Home School. Wolgemuth & Hyatt. ISBN 0-943497-06-X.
