= Gresh =

Gresh is a surname. Notable people with the surname include:

- Alain Gresh (born 1948), French journalist
- Andy Gresh (born 1974), American sports broadcaster
- Dannah Gresh (born 1967), American public speaker
- Lois H. Gresh (21st century), American novelist

It may also refer to:

- Gresh, a fictional character in the Bionicle franchise produced by Lego
