= Do Hard Things =

Do Hard Things: A Teenage Rebellion Against Low Expectations
- Author: Alex and Brett Harris
- Publisher: WaterBrook Multnomah
- Publication date: April 15, 2008
- Pages: 256
- ISBN: 978-1-60142-112-8
- OCLC: 166380056
- Dewey Decimal: 248.8/3 22
- LC Class: BV4598.2 .H36 2008

Do Hard Things: A Teenage Rebellion Against Low Expectations is a popular Christian book authored by Alex and Brett Harris, founders of The Rebelution. It was published by WaterBrook Multnomah, a division of Random House, on April 15, 2008.

Do Hard Things has been one of the top 10 religious titles on Nielsen BookScan, and was an Amazon.com bestseller.

== Synopsis ==
In Do Hard Things, the Harris brothers attempt to "explode the myth of adolescence," and show that prior to the 20th century, a person was either an adult or a child. The book challenges teenagers to go beyond their comfort zone, and, in essence, "do hard things." The foreword was contributed by Chuck Norris.

== Recantation ==
On April 1, 2020, a satirical blog post by Nathaniel Hendry sparked false rumors that the Harris twins had recanted their book, similarly to how their older brother, Joshua Harris had recanted his bestseller, I Kissed Dating Goodbye.
