= The Rebelution =

Christian youth organization

- Formation: August 2005
- Type: NGO
- Purpose: Youth organization
- Leader: Alex and Brett Harris
- Website: TheRebelution.com

The Rebelution is a Christian ministry/organization directed at youth, describing itself as "a teenage rebellion against low expectations." It was founded in August 2005 by twin brothers Alex and Brett Harris, younger brothers of best-selling author and former pastor, Joshua Harris.

== About ==
At age 16, Alex and Brett started a blog called The Rebelution. Since then, the Rebelution movement has grown to include a website and international speaking tour.

Expanding on the topic of the blog, the Harris brothers have published two books for Christian teenagers, Do Hard Things: A Teenage Rebellion Against Low Expectations (2008) and Start Here: Doing Hard Things Right Where You Are (2010) with WaterBrook Multnomah, a division of Random House. The Rebelution Tour, a series of one-day conferences for teens and parents, took place every summer from 2007 to 2011. The Rebelution website has been closed to further submissions since August 2024.

== Alex and Brett Harris ==
Alex and Brett Harris have been featured nationally on MSNBC, CNN, NPR, and in The New York Times. They were supporters of the campaign of Mike Huckabee. Their father is Gregg Harris, a figure in the Christian homeschooling movement. Alex graduated from Harvard Law School, and served as a law clerk to Supreme Court Justice Anthony Kennedy. In 2017, Brett co-founded the Young Writers Workshop with Jaquelle Crowe (now Jaquelle Ferris), an online membership-based workshop for young Christian aspiring writers.

== The Modesty Survey ==
The Modesty Survey was an anonymous survey aimed at Christian teenagers, gathering quantitative and qualitative answers of what Christian boys consider to be immodesty. Hundreds of Christian females submitted questions to the 148-question survey and over 1,500 Christian males participated. It has been endorsed by Shaunti Feldhahn, R. Albert Mohler, Jr., and C. J. Mahaney, among others. Some groups criticized the survey for treating modesty as something that pertains only to girls, or as something that men get to define.

== See also ==
- Do Hard Things: A Teenage Rebellion Against Low Expectations
