= Larry Tomczak =

American evangelist and author

Larry Tomczak is a Christian evangelist and author. He co-founded People of Destiny International, a network of churches, and was editor of People of Destiny magazine. Tomczak is the author of several books, most prominently Clap Your Hands!, an autobiography.

== Early life ==
Tomczak was born into a Roman Catholic family in Ohio, and in his youth was part of a local rock band.

Tomczak was involved in the charismatic renewal of the 1970s, as described in his book Clap Your Hands! Together with C.J. Mahaney, Tomczak co-founded the Covenant Life Church, which would later become known as the Sovereign Grace Churches. Tomczak eventually left the ministry in 1998, at the time citing theological differences.

== Slander lawsuit settlement ==
In 1983, Tomczak paid $150,000 to settle a lawsuit for repeatedly slandering psychiatrist Thomas Anthony Harris and his wife, Amy, authors of the best-seller I'm O.K. - You're OK.

In 1983 The New York Times reported that Tomczak repeatedly and publicly claimed "'Most people today don't know that the author of that book committed suicide about two years ago, and yet people are still practicing some of his philosophies." Dr. Harris was still alive, and in fact died 12 years later at the age of 85.

According to Dr. Harris, the lies "hurt his reputation, forced cancellation of speaking appearances, and caused a 50 percent drop in book sales."

== Views on homosexuality ==
Tomczak subscribes to the research of Paul Cameron which claims that gays and lesbians suffer higher rates of mental illness and suicide, among other things, and links these to their inherent sexuality. Tomczak has expressed his view that sexual orientation is a learned behavior:

People are not born homosexual. According to Scripture and science, homosexuality is not part of someone's biological constitution. People will argue to the contrary, but being gay is not like left-handedness. There is absolutely no scientific evidence of a gay gene. Nature or nurture? The answer is the latter. This is not opinion; it's truth.

In January 2015, Tomczak wrote a letter on The Christian Post to television personality Ellen DeGeneres, after she mentioned a recent article of his on her show to argue "I don't have an agenda".

== Personal life ==
Tomczak has been married for over 40 years and has four children. He lives in the Nashville metropolitan area.

Throughout 2020, Tomczak was a strong supporter of Donald Trump's re-election campaign. On November 19, 2020 Tomczak posted a video. Therein he claims that "...the fact that Dems have stolen the election." Tomczak also claimed that Donald Trump would prevail through "divine intervention."

In July 2011, Tomczak released a letter stating that he and Mahaney have since reconciled, and that Mahaney has made a full apology to Tomczak and his family for any wrongdoing on the part of the ministry.

In November 2011, however, Tomczak released another letter stating that Sovereign Grace Churches had subjected him and his family to spiritual abuse, slander, and blackmailing. In particular, they had questioned Tomczak's fitness as a father due to what Tomczak called his son's "teenage rebellion". Tomczak now asserts that his family left Sovereign Grace Churches to escape this abuse.

== Bibliography ==
- The Little Handbook On Loving Correction: How To Raise Happy, Obedient, Respectful Children
- Clap Your Hands!
- Divine Appointments
- Reckless Abandon
- God, the rod, and Your child's bod: The art of loving correction for Christian parents
