= Sovereign Grace Churches =

Network of Protestant churches

- Abbreviation: SGC
- Classification: Protestant, Evangelical
- Orientation: Continuationist, Calvinist
- Executive Director: Mark Prater
- Region: United States (primarily)
- Headquarters: Louisville, Kentucky, U.S.
- Origin: 1982; Gaithersburg, Maryland, U.S.
- Congregations: 133
- Official website: sovereigngrace.com

Sovereign Grace Churches (SGC), formerly People of Destiny International (PDI) and Sovereign Grace Ministries (SGM), is an evangelical network of churches, based primarily in the United States, whose theology is Reformed and continuationist. The organization is headquartered in Louisville, Kentucky.

The movement grew out of the charismatic renewal of the 1970s under Larry Tomczak and C. J. Mahaney. Its roots were in a prayer meeting in the Washington, D.C., area that developed into Covenant Life Church in Maryland. In 1982, Tomczak, Mahaney, Brent Detwiler and others formed People of Destiny International as an umbrella organization for their ministries. During the 1990s, the movement shifted increasingly toward Reformed theology; Tomczak subsequently left the organization. PDI became Sovereign Grace Ministries in 2002 and adopted its present name in 2014. Mahaney, who had become the organization's principal leader, took a leave of absence in 2011 while complaints about his leadership were reviewed and was reinstated the following year. He stepped down as president in 2013 after a period in which Covenant Life and a number of other churches left the network.

Church planting has been a significant part of the movement's work, both through establishing new congregations and, later, by admitting existing churches considered compatible with its doctrine and practices. SGC also operates Sovereign Grace Music, which has produced contemporary worship music since the 1980s. Several of its albums have appeared on the Billboard Christian albums chart.

Sovereign Grace has faced controversy over its leadership culture and its handling of allegations of child sexual abuse. Some former members and critics have characterized the movement as cult-like and accused its leaders of exercising excessive authority; the organization and its supporters have disputed those characterizations. A civil lawsuit filed in Maryland in 2012 alleged that leaders of Sovereign Grace Ministries had conspired to conceal child sexual abuse and failed to report allegations to police. The Maryland plaintiffs' claims were dismissed because the statute of limitations had expired, and subsequent appellate proceedings ended in 2014. In a separate case, former Covenant Life Church youth mentor Nathaniel Morales was convicted in 2014 of sexually abusing four boys between 1983 and 1991; reporting on the trial said that several church staff members had previously been told of his abuse but had not notified police.

== History ==
The organization of over 80 member churches grew out of the charismatic renewal of the 1970s under the leadership of Larry Tomczak. It has its roots in a charismatic prayer meeting in Silver Spring, Maryland, then Washington, DC, called Take and Give (TAG), which grew into Covenant Life Church, the former flagship of Sovereign Grace. Tomczak co-founded the church with C. J. Mahaney. Mahaney has referred to himself informally as a "former pothead." Larry Tomczak withdrew from the Charismatic scene shortly before the creation of Covenant Life Church.

In 1981, Brent Detweiler, pastor of Indiana Christian Fellowship in Indiana, Pennsylvania, asked Mahaney and Tomczak to provide oversight and accountability for his church. The two churches formed an informal church-planting partnership. In 1982, shortly after planting a church in Cleveland, Mahaney, Tomczak and Detweiler formed People of Destiny International (PDI) as an umbrella organization for their various ministries. The original apostolic team comprised Mahaney, Tomczak, Detweiler and Bill Galbraith. Tomczak and Mahaney and the movement were influenced by Bryn Jones and Terry Virgo, leaders of the British New Church Movement. Both Tomczak and Mahaney spoke at New Frontiers' Bible Weeks and the Stoneleigh Conference.

They were also friendly with Maranatha Campus Ministries for a period. In "The Blackwell Encyclopedia of Modern Christian Thought" published in 1995, Alister McGrath associated PDI with the Shepherding Movement and described it as having "informal links with Bryn Jones", the UK house church leader. In the mid-1990s, while Tomczak was still involved in the group's leadership, religious anthropologist Dr. Karla Poewe wrote that "Vineyard is particularly attractive to the young and intellectual... People of Destiny serves a Catholic constituency" although participants at that time would not agree with this assessment, contrasting PDI with the Vineyard Church. The theological focus gradually shifted during the mid-1990s and it was later suggested that the increasing New Calvinism of PDI was a major factor in Larry Tomczak's departure from the movement.

Although reconciled with C. J. Mahaney in 2011, Tomczak earlier described the parting of ways with Sovereign Grace Ministries as "an unbelievable nightmare" during which his family "were threatened in various ways if [they] did not cooperate with [PDI/SGM]... A letter was circulated in an attempt to discredit me and to distort the events surrounding my departure." Other notable charismatic figures, such as Lou Engle, founder of The Call prayer concerts, and Ché Ahn, pastor of Harvest Rock Church in Pasadena, California, also ceased to be formally associated with PDI during this period. As of 2008 the group identified itself as "a family of churches passionate about the gospel of Jesus Christ... with a strong doctrinal basis that is evangelical, Reformed, and continuationist." This move towards Reformed (or Calvinist) doctrine is illustrated by Sovereign Grace's partnerships with Reformed theologians—such as John MacArthur, Mark Dever, and John Piper—in events like the Together for the Gospel Conferences. In the summer of 2009, Detweiler, who had left the SGM board in 2009, released a series of documents detailing numerous grievances with Mahaney, including concerns about Mahaney's leadership style. On July 6, 2011, Mahaney announced that he would be taking a leave of absence as a team reviewed charges brought against him of "pride, unentreatability, deceit, sinful judgment, and hypocrisy." One of the purposes for this period included reconciliation with former SGM ministers. Larry Tomczak reported that Mahaney had gone out of his way to rebuild their relationship after 13 years of estrangement. On January 25, 2012, Mahaney was reinstated as president of the organization by the board after three review panels found no reason to disqualify him from his role as president, or to "call into question his fitness for gospel ministry."

Early in 2012, Sovereign Grace Ministries announced their intention to relocate their headquarters from Gaithersburg, Maryland, to Louisville, Kentucky, citing Louisville's lower cost of living as well as the growing connection with the Southern Baptist Theological Seminary in town. Some critics have suggested that the move may have more to do with the fractured state of the organization's relationship with the SGM flagship church, Covenant Life Church in Gaithersburg. Later in 2012, the movement's former flagship, Covenant Life Church, departed from SGM, a decision supported by an overwhelming 93% of voting members. Additionally, the Sovereign Grace churches in Indiana and Altoona, PA, Sarasota and Daytona Beach, FL and Charlottesville, VA cut ties with the movement during this period. Daytona Beach's pastor Jesse Jarvis noted a "leadership culture characterized by excessive authority and insufficient accountability" as rationale for the church's departure. The Indiana church was one of the charter members of SGM. About 80 churches from the United States and around the world remained in the organization. By March 2013 approximately 20 churches had left Sovereign Grace Ministries. During that same month C.J. Mahaney announced "that he would step down as president of SGM's beleaguered network of churches."

In January 2015, Joshua Harris, leader of SGM's former flagship church Covenant Life Church, resigned as lead pastor, saying he planned to attend seminary to pursue more formal education and connection to other branches of Christianity. He believed that "the isolation of Covenant Life, and of a small cluster of churches of which it was a part, may have fed leadership mistakes, including the decision of pastors—himself among them—to handle a child sexual abuse case internally instead of going to police."

=== History of name changes ===
Sovereign Grace Churches was known as "People of Destiny International" until 1998. British restorationist leader Terry Virgo says that Larry Tomczak and C. J. Mahaney, leaders at the time, had become "increasingly uncomfortable" with the "People of Destiny International" name, and it became "PDI Ministries". In 2002, the group adopted its next name of "Sovereign Grace Ministries." In December 2014, executive director Mark Prater announced that the group's name would change to "Sovereign Grace Churches", to reflect its newly changed structure.

== Church planting ==
Church planter Fred Herron described the PDI/SGM church planting method of founding new churches: a pastor leads a group of members to relocate to a different city and form, or plant, a new church. The first church adoption was in Cleveland Ohio. North Coast Church formerly called Crossroads Christian Community was founded in 1980. It was a growing fellowship of 200 people but lacked the apostolic oversight for greater growth. Co-pastors Steve Witt and Bob Cohen invited an "Apostolic Team" the fall of 1980 to come and assist in "apostolic restructuring." Steve Witt's father had been influential in Larry Tomczaks salvation and transfer from Cleveland to DC area. A team arrived in April 1981 of 11 people, including Tomczak and family. They stayed for one year before returning to Washington, D.C., leaving behind a team to oversee and develop North Coast Church. North Coast thrived and grew until its ultimate demise decades later. For many years, PDI did not adopt existing churches, but later altered its policy. SGM adoption of an existing church begins with the development of a relationship with leadership and continues with dialogue to evaluate the doctrinal and practical compatibility of Sovereign Grace with the church desiring adoption.

== Sovereign Grace Music ==
Sovereign Grace Music
- Origin: Louisville, Kentucky, U.S.
- Genres: CCM; contemporary worship music
- Years active: 1984–present
- Label: Sovereign Grace Music
- Members: Bob Kauflin; Mark Altrogge; Steve Cook; Vikki Cook; Pat Sczebel; Joel Sczebel; Doug Plank; Jonathan Baird; Ryan Baird; Meghan Baird
- Website: https://sovereigngracemusic.org/

Sovereign Grace Churches also operates Sovereign Grace Music, based in Louisville, Kentucky, where contemporary worship albums have been released every few years since the 1980s. Sovereign Grace Music is directed by worship leader Bob Kauflin, a former member of Christian band Glad, and is known for lyrics grounded in biblical doctrine. Kauflin employs many other songwriters and pastors from other churches to aid in the songwriting process for Sovereign Grace Music. In 2011, Sovereign Grace Music's album Risen charted at No. 41 on the Billboard Top Christian Albums chart. Since then, five other albums have charted, the highest being From Age To Age (2012) at No. 25.

== Controversies ==
=== Cult allegations ===
Some former members and critics have described Sovereign Grace Churches as having "cult-like" characteristics, citing the authority historically exercised by founder C. J. Mahaney and accounts from former members who said dissent or criticism of leadership was discouraged. Journalistic coverage of controversies surrounding the organization has also noted accusations of "dictatorial conduct" within the movement that estranged former members and were compared to cult-like behavior. Supporters of the organization dispute this characterization and have denied allegations of systemic wrongdoing.

=== Claims of abuse cover-up ===
In late 2012, a lawsuit in Montgomery County, Maryland was brought against Sovereign Grace Ministries, making accusations of a conspiracy to cover-up child sex abuse. The plaintiffs claimed that church leaders, including Mahaney, did not report accusations of misconduct to the police. Larry Tomczak, a co-founder of SGM, who left the organization in the late 1990s, was alleged to have abused and assaulted a child in the form of administering corporal punishment over a period of twenty-five years. Tomczak was investigated and no charges were filed against him. All others named in the lawsuit were investigated by law enforcement, and no charges were filed.

The plaintiffs asked the court to determine whether or not there had been a conspiracy to cover up abuse. Judge Burrell dismissed all of the claims by the Maryland plaintiffs in May 2013 because the statute of limitations had expired; the claims by two Virginia plaintiffs were still within the statute of limitations.

An appeal of the lower court's decision was heard in May 2014, but it was rejected on procedural grounds. On September 24, 2014, Maryland's highest civil court, the Court of Appeals, denied certiorari, effectively ending the case.

Maryland Circuit Judge Sharon Burrell permanently barred the Maryland plaintiffs from ever bringing those or related charges in Maryland civil court again at any time in the future. During the hearing, Judge Burrell referred to an affidavit filed by Brent Detwiler supporting the claims of the plaintiffs as "vague and irrelevant". The court also found that the "Covenant Life School" sued by the plaintiffs did not exist during the time frame of the alleged abuse.

Time magazine reported in February 2016 that Susan Burke, the lawyer for the victims, planned to file another lawsuit in Virginia, involving the two individuals from that jurisdiction.

==== Maryland State Senate committee hearings (March 2016) ====
On March 8, 2016, two individuals testified before the Maryland State Senate Judicial Proceedings Committee regarding the Sovereign Grace Ministries lawsuit. Charlotte Ennis, a member of the church, testified that the lawsuit was, "an egregious, and even bizarre, $50 million class action suit alleging child sexual abuse and cover up that was undoubtedly false." According to Ennis, the lawsuit originally asked for $50 million in damages, but as the deposition and discovery process went on, "the plaintiffs tried hard to settle out of court for a much lower sum". She testified that the defense had refused to settle out of court, requiring that the case be heard in court on its merits. As a result, the case was dismissed. Ennis testified only about the Maryland plaintiffs.

In the case brought by Renee Palmer Gamby, Ennis said that the child in question had been "abused at age two by a babysitter whose case was criminally prosecuted in 1993", and that the church had advised the family of the child to report the abuse to police.

In the case brought by Robin Roe (a pseudonym), Ennis testified that:

[Roe] claimed the church had incarcerated her, ruining her life. Actually, she was charged and imprisoned by state and federal authorities for crimes of fraud, theft, drug possession, drug trafficking, and weapons concerns.

(Allegation Number 57 of the lawsuit reads: "As a result of the Church's conduct and misrepresentations, Robin Roe was not cared for by loving and responsible adults, but instead was incarcerated in a juvenile half-way house with criminal juveniles.")

Ennis also said that, "A third plaintiff eventually withdrew her allegations, admitting they were false."

Regarding the alleged pedophile ring at the church's school, Ennis testified that:

Investigators found that the supposed ringleader teacher was not even at the school for the majority of that year. He was in the hospital because his back was so bad he couldn't walk. The actual teacher was the accuser's own mother. The allegations included closets and rooms that did not match those in the school building. To date the police have filed no charges against anyone in that case.

Ennis added that, "even though there is no criminal statute of limitations in Maryland", none of the three plaintiffs alleging charges of multiple cases of child sex abuse and rape at the church school had filed actual criminal charges.

Ennis went on to testify that an "extensive and undoubtedly expensive" investigation was conducted by the Montgomery County Police Department but no charges were ever filed. A subsequent examination of the case, conducted by an independent investigator, found that—not including the case prosecuted in 1993—the allegations of child sex abuse detailed in the lawsuit "likely never happened at all".

At the same Senate hearing another individual, Terry Mayo, testified that her husband was one of the people accused of abuse in the Sovereign Grace lawsuit and that she and her husband "had experienced the nightmare of false accusations". In her testimony, Mayo said:

In 2013, in a lawsuit against our church, a woman accused my husband and three others of molesting her twenty-five years earlier. She did not remember the alleged “abuses” before her thirties, and then believed she was recovering lost memories. She also imagined that 18 people witnessed the abuse, and she listed them by name. However, none of those named supported her stories of abuse. Montgomery County police investigated and filed no charges. After eighteen months, an independent investigator concluded her accusations likely never happened.

Mayo also said that her husband "had contemporaneous records from the 1980s that refuted the allegations".

==== Washingtonian magazine apology ====
A 2016 story in the Washingtonian magazine by Tiffany Stanley highlights three families who were plaintiffs in the lawsuit and their involvement with Sovereign Grace Ministries. The article quotes Plaintiff's attorney, Susan Burke, saying that she "plans to file a new suit in Virginia against the Fairfax church on behalf of at least two plaintiffs." According to the Washingtonian article, leaders of the formerly SGM-affiliated Covenant Life Church in Fairfax, Virginia that stood accused in the lawsuit (alongside Mahaney and SGM) have "acknowledged the stories of abuse and issued a tearful apology to the families...", going on to say that "senior pastor Mark Mullery blamed the church’s model of reconciliation... [which] resulted in the victim’s family being corrected when they should have been gently cared for as sufferers".

=== Nathaniel Morales ===
In a different case in 2014, Nathaniel Morales, a youth mentor at Covenant Life Church, who "led youth bible studies, directed worship teams, and even attended sleepovers," was convicted of abusing four boys between 1983 and 1991. "Between 1990 and 2007 at least five members of the church’s staff were told of Morales’s abuse. None notified the police." Subsequently, Covenant Life Church former pastor Grant Layman [Mahaney's brother-in-law] said, while testifying about allegations against Nathaniel Morales, that he [Layman] had not reported the abuse to the police. Layman was not on trial and was not given an opportunity to clarify his remarks in court. Pastors are not mandatory reporters in the State of Maryland. An independent investigator reported that Morales was never a paid employee of Covenant Life Church. Ennis testified before the Maryland Senate Committee that no one had testified during the Morales trial that the church had advised them not to report. In November 2013, SGM issued a statement saying that, years after pastoral counsel was sought, "allowing courts to second guess pastoral guidance would represent a blow to the First Amendment." Regarding the accuracy of the plaintiffs' claims, SGM released a statement saying that "SGM is not in a position to comment on the specific allegations at this time, but upon review it appears the complaint contains a number of misleading allegations, as well as considerable mischaracterizations of intent."
