= Passion and Purity =

Book by Elisabeth Elliot

Passion and Purity: Learning to Bring Your Love Life Under Christ's Control
- Author: Elisabeth Elliot
- Language: English
- Genre: Religious
- Publication date: 1984

Passion and Purity: Learning to Bring Your Love Life Under Christ's Control, published in 1984 and written by Elisabeth Elliot, is an evangelical Protestant book, part manifesto and part autobiography, on the subject of romantic relationships. The book recounts Elliot's friendship and romance with missionary Jim Elliot, beginning in the 1940s and ending with his death in 1956. Elliot uses anecdotes from her relationship with Jim to expound on her views concerning pure, Christian relationships and the practice of waiting on God for romantic timing and direction. The book emphasises female self-sacrifice: denying one's wishes in order to submit to God and one's (future) husband and maintain sexual purity. The late Ruth Bell Graham, wife of popular evangelist Billy Graham, wrote the preface.

Since the time of its publication, Passion and Purity has gained notoriety in conservative evangelical circles, and influenced the creation of the popular 1997 book, I Kissed Dating Goodbye, by Joshua Harris. Both books have gained wide respect in conservative evangelical social practice among singles, and together have been responsible for the circulation of the word courtship, a term Harris and his supporters prefer to dating. Harris has argued that courtship's connotation is more in keeping with the kind of romantic programme espoused by both him and Elliot.

== See also ==
- Purity culture
