= Together for the Gospel =

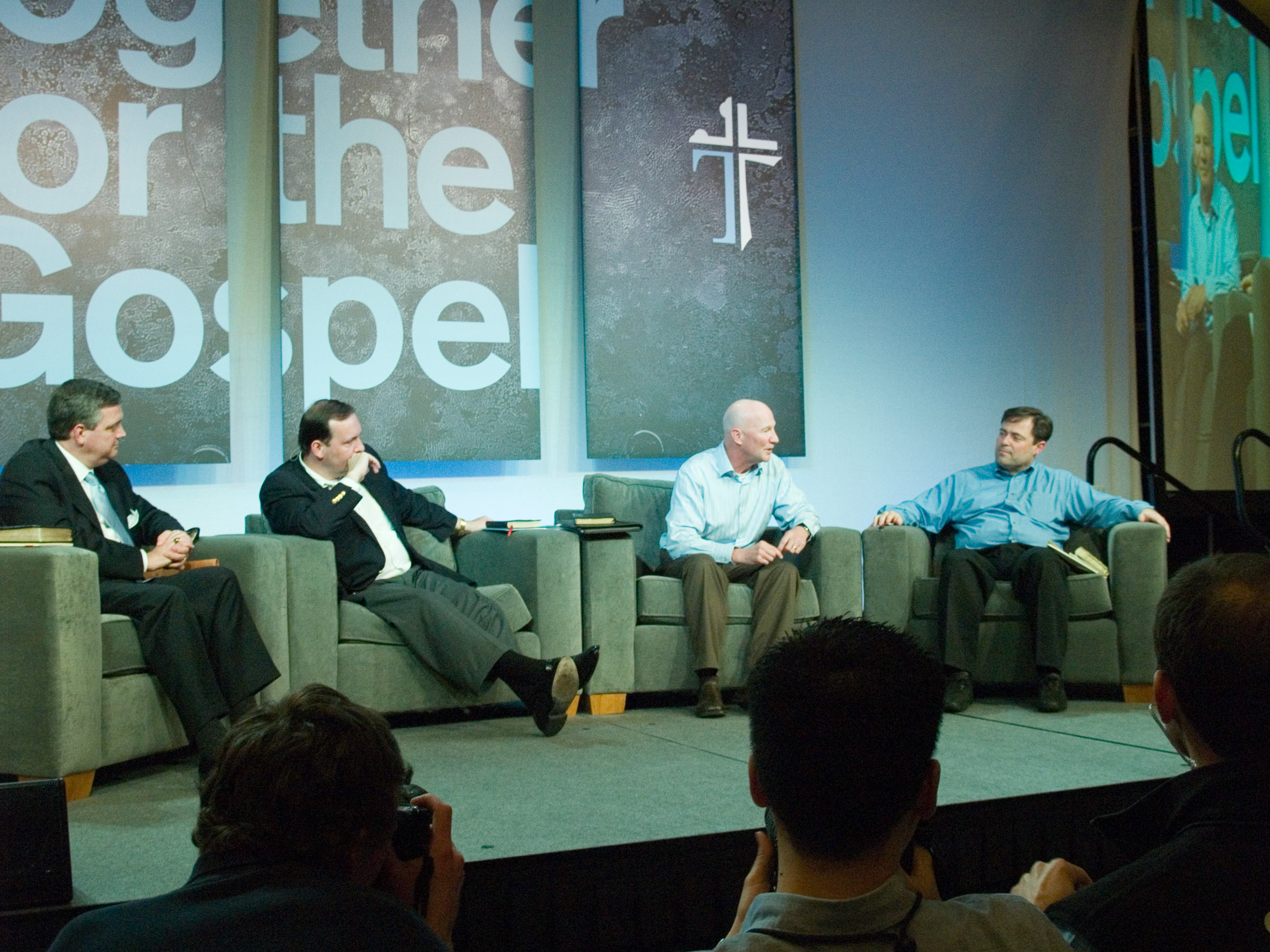
The four founders of T4G – Albert Mohler, Ligon Duncan, C. J. Mahaney, and Mark Dever – during a panel discussion at the inaugural conference in 2006.

Together for the Gospel (T4G) was a biennial conference for Christian leaders. It was formed in 2006 by Mark Dever, Ligon Duncan, C. J. Mahaney, and Albert Mohler. These men were all associated with the New Calvinism movement although they differed on issues such as baptism and charismatic gifts. The first conference also included John Piper, John F. MacArthur, and R. C. Sproul as speakers. The stated aim of the conference was to "encourage and aid ministry leaders with three days of biblical preaching, fellowship, books, and singing." It was held in Louisville, Kentucky. Other speakers included Matt Chandler, Kevin DeYoung, and David Platt.

Mahaney withdrew as a speaker from the 2014 conference due to the Sovereign Grace Churches sex abuse scandal. He returned in 2016 but withdrew again in 2018. Baptist News Global noted that in 2020 John MacArthur was absent and suggested a possible rift over social justice issues: MacArthur had signed the Statement on Social Justice and the Gospel but Al Mohler had not. The 2020 conference was held online due to the COVID-19 pandemic.

In 2021, Mohler left the group and Dever and Duncan subsequently announced that the 2022 conference would be the last.
