= New Calvinism =

20th- and 21st-century theological movement

New Calvinism, also known as the Young, Restless, and Reformed Movement, is a movement within conservative Evangelicalism that reinterprets 16th century Calvinism under contemporary US values and ideologies.

== History ==
The movement started in the 1980s, with the founding of the Council on Biblical Manhood and Womanhood in 1987 in the United States, which stresses the complementarianism between men and women (in contrast to egalitarianism, and as opposed to feminism). The teaching of covenant theology (as opposed to Wesleyanism, or Arminian theology), a rejection of dispensationalism, and a church governance by male elders are also hallmarks of the movement.

The movement gained wider publicity with a conference held in Louisville, Kentucky, in 2006, Together for the Gospel by American pastors John Piper, Paul Washer, John MacArthur, Matt Chandler, Al Mohler, Mark Dever and CJ Mahaney. In March 2009, Time magazine ranked it as one of the "10 Ideas Changing the World Right Now", while questioning if "more Christians searching for security will submit their wills to the austerely demanding God of their country's infancy".

== "Old" and New Calvinism ==
Rooted in the historical tradition of Calvinist theology, New Calvinists are united by their common doctrine. In a Christianity Today article, Collin Hansen describes the speakers of a Christian conference:

Each of the seven speakers holds to the five points of Calvinism. Yet none of them spoke of Calvinism unless I asked about it. They did express worry about perceived evangelical accommodation to postmodernism and criticized churches for applying business models to ministry. They mostly joked about their many differences on such historically difficult issues as baptism, church government, eschatology, and the gifts of the Holy Spirit. They drew unity as Calvinist evangelicals from their concerns: with seeker churches, Church Growth marketing, and manipulative revival techniques.

— Hansen, 2006

As implied by the “New” designation, some differences have been observed between the New and Old schools. John Piper, for example, has identified what he considers to be 7 main differences between the two:

1. New Calvinism is complementarian and not egalitarian.
2. New Calvinism uses contemporary forms of music.
3. New Calvinism is popular among Baptists.
4. New Calvinism is popular also among Charismatics.
5. The books of Jonathan Edwards feature prominently, in addition to those of John Calvin.
6. New Calvinism is engaged to using the internet and social media to communicate.
7. New Calvinism includes multiculturalism.

== Criticism ==
R. Scott Clark, professor of church history and historical theology from Westminster Seminary California, argues that New Calvinists like Mark Driscoll should not be called Calvinists merely because they believe in the five points of Calvinism, but rather he suggests that adherence to the Three Forms of Unity and other Reformed confessions of faith is what qualifies one a Calvinist. Specifically, he suggests that many of the New Calvinists' positions on infant baptism, covenant theology, and continuation of the gifts of the Spirit are out of step with the Reformed tradition.

J. Todd Billings, professor of Reformed Theology at Western Theological Seminary, argues that the New Calvinists "tend to obscure the fact that the Reformed tradition has a deeply catholic heritage, a Christ-centered sacramental practice and a wide-lens, kingdom vision for the Christian's vocation in the world."

Between 2012 and 2013 numerous Southern Baptist Ministers responded to New Calvinism by affirming a "Statement of the Traditional Southern Baptist Understanding". The document was originally endorsed by six former SBC presidents: Morris Chapman, Jimmy Draper, Paige Patterson, Bailey Smith, Bobby Welch, and Jerry Vines, two seminary presidents Chuck Kelley of New Orleans Baptist Theological Seminary, and five state executive directors (Jim Futral of Mississippi, David Hankins of Louisiana, Mike Procter of Alaska, John Sullivan of Florida, and Bob White of Georgia). The statement includes a Preamble and 10 articles of affirmation and denial as it relates to Christian Soteriology.

Traditional Reformed theologians criticize the selective and altered use of texts by Reformed classical authors, like Spurgeon in the publications of the New Calvinists without alerting their readers.

== New Calvinism Around the World ==
=== China ===
In China, a new form of Calvinism emerged independently and without the influence of the American movement of the same name in the 1990s. The movement in Asia developed in a completely different way from the rest of the world, especially in China, where it was provoked by the large number of highly educated people who converted to Protestantism as a way of combating what they consider to be doctrinal errors spread by native churches in the country and building a national church within Calvinism.

The emphasis of Chinese Calvinism is on ecclesiology and the involvement of Christianity with the State and society. One of the means of spreading Calvinism in the country is literature and the translation of works by Reformed authors. Unlike the new Calvinism in the Americas, the Chinese movement seeks to distance itself completely from charismatic influence, thus becoming closer to denominations such as the Presbyterian churches, especially due to the influence of missions in South Korea, the country with the largest number of Presbyterians in the world. In addition, the profile of Chinese Calvinists is more educated and younger than that of other Chinese Protestants. Although present in the official Chinese church, the Three-Self Patriotic Movement, Calvinists have developed mainly in house church movements.

One of the effects of the People's Republic of China (PRC) rapprochement with capitalism is its expansion of individual freedoms and religious freedom. Since then, interest in Calvinism has grown in the country.

For most scholars, the focus is on the cultural and political implications of this trend, an appropriate focus given that much of this recent growth has been driven by intellectuals within China who are attracted to the transformative potential of Abraham Kuyper’s (Kuyperian) model of cultural engagement for contemporary Chinese society. For a smaller number of scholars, the interest in Reformed theology reflects a broader interest in exploring the potential of reinforced confessional identities to enable the church in China to come to terms politically, socially, and legally with the theological variety that is perceived as at the root of much of the conflict directed at and growing within the Chinese church today.

=== Brazil ===
In Brazil, the new Calvinism movement has many similarities with the North American movement, and its growth occurred mainly through the internet, but also through literary production and conferences. Due to the diversity of influential leaders, New Calvinism reaches Baptists, Methodists, Anglicans and the Assemblies of God in Brazil, not limited to the Reformed Churches as in the past.

The criticism of Neo-Pentecostalism, widely disseminated in Pentecostal, Baptist and Reformed churches, brought the various Protestant groups closer together. Due to the desire for reform spread by several Protestant pastors in the 2000s and 2010s, criticisms of neo-Pentecostal Anthropocentrism by Calvinist preachers are supported and shared by young evangelicals of all traditions. In addition, the participation of Pentecostals in conferences, congresses and symposiums with a doctrinally reformed vision has increased, and such participation has further influenced Calvinism's rapprochement with classical Pentecostalism. As a cultural movement that creates its own values and traditions, New Calvinism has served as a reaction to secularism and an impulse to return to principles and lifestyles in accordance with the Christian faith. Although New Calvinism is largely interdenominational, the Presbyterian Church of Brazil, the largest Calvinist denomination in Brazil, experienced rapid growth between 2004 and 2016. Part of this growth is the result of the exodus of mainly former Pentecostals to Presbyterianism.

Among the denominations most affected by the movement are the Pentecostal churches, which in recent decades have undergone a drastic change in the profile of their members. Although Pentecostalism grew mainly among people with lower incomes and less education in the 1960s-2000s, in recent decades this has changed. The social ascension of many Pentecostals, as well as the increase in the level of education in the country, allowed many Pentecostals to become interested in theological study. Reformed literature met this need, spreading widely among Pentecostals.

Several independent Reformed communities and Reformed Baptist or Covenant Baptist churches emerged adhering to the New Calvinism in Brazil. However, they emphasize that their focus is on individual salvation and that their (New) Calvinist theology would simply be the expression of biblical theology.

The main consequences of the New Calvinism in Brazil include:

1. the emergence of Reformed Pentecostalism, an orientation that seeks to converge the Pentecostal and Reformed traditions, represented mainly by the New Life Christian Church;
2. the emergence, in 2017, of the Reformed Baptist Convention of Brazil, which seeks to bring together Calvinist Baptists;
3. the emergence, in 2009, of the Reformed Anglican Church of Brazil, created by Anglican Calvinists;
4. the accelerated growth of the Presbyterian Church of Brazil between 2004 and 2016, which, according to the denomination's statistics, grew by more than 37% between the years, while the Brazilian population grew by 10.5%;
5. the emergence of several new Calvinist denominations in Brazil, such as the Christian Church of the Alliance (2001)[5], Igreja Esperança (2008), and the Presbyterian Church of the Reformation in Brazil (2017);
6. the creation of a Declaration of Faith by the General Convention of the Assemblies of God in Brazil in 2017, which declares Arminianism as official doctrine and combats Calvinism;
7. splits in traditionally Pentecostal churches that gave rise to Calvinist churches. In 2020, specifically, part of the leadership of the Maranatha Christian Church and a few thousand members joined together to form the Revivalist Reformed Christian Church, with more than one hundred temples and congregations in the year of its founding; and
8. participation of several Calvinist pastors in the Bolsonaro Government.

The main names of the Brazilian movement include Augustus Nicodemus Lopes, Hernandes Dias Lopes, Heber Campos Júnior, Jonas Madureira, Russell Shedd, Yago Martins and Franklin Ferreira.
