= Yago Martins =

Brazilian theologian

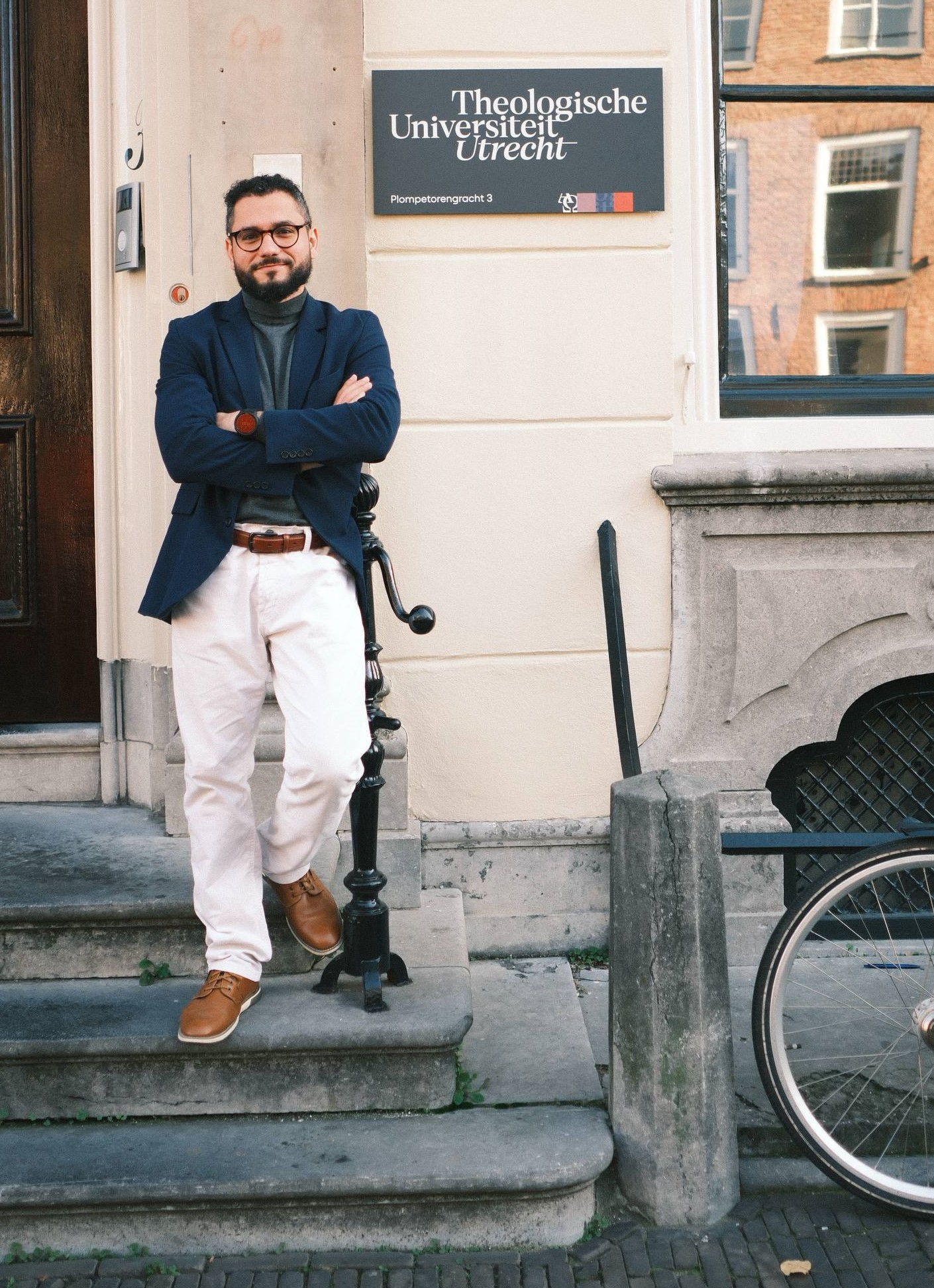

Yago de Castro Martins (Fortaleza, June 1, 1992) is a Brazilian theologian, writer, Baptist pastor, podcaster and YouTuber, being one of the main exponents of New Calvinism in Brazil. He is president of the Schaeffer Institute of Theology and Culture and owner of the YouTube channel Dois Dedos De Teologia (Two Cents of Theology, in free translation), the largest Reformed theology channel in Brazil. He is a member of Mensa, the largest and oldest high-IQ society in the world, which brings together the 2% with the highest IQs of the global population.

== Academic background ==
He studied accounting at the Federal University of Ceará, but left the course unfinished to study Ministerial Theology at the Maranata Bible Seminary and Institute. After the seminary, he obtained a bachelor's degree in Theology from the South American Theological College and a master's degree (Th.M.) in Systematic Theology from the Aubrey Clark Institute, where he studied with renowned theologians such as Douglas Moo, Darrell Bock, John Feinberg and Michael Vlach. He also holds a postgraduate degree in Neuroscience and Applied psychology from Mackenzie Presbyterian University and graduated from the first postgraduate class in the Austrian school of economics at Italian-Brazilian University Center.

== Awards and honors ==
In 2017, his article Eschatology and Utopia: the religious origins of socialist hope received the Gabriel Oliva Prize for best article in the Political science category at the 5th edition of the Austrian School Conference in Brazil.

In 2018, he was honored by the Fortaleza City Council for his leading role in the fight for religious freedom.

In 2019, he received magna cum laude in his Sacrae Theologiae Magister in Systematic theology from the Aubrey Clark Institute.

== Religious and ministerial background ==
Yago Martins recounts that he found God when he was a teenager afraid of death, which made him question how life could be lived in the face of the inevitability of death. From this turning point on, he began to ponder the justification of existence. This reflection led him to consider the existence of something beyond immediate reality, involving not only an intellectual effort, but an emotional and volitional search to find a greater purpose. The assumption that guided this search was the belief that life needed to have a more significant reason than individual interests. It was in this context, in 2006, at the age of 14, that Martins found in Christianity a structure that offered meaning and justified his own existence.

It was between 2010 and 2011 that, as a young evangelical, around twenty years old, Martins embraced the Reformed faith, and soon began working on producing, translating, and disseminating Calvinist content, mainly through the Internet, initially participating in the Voltemos ao Evangelho team. In 2012, he entered the Theology seminary, graduating in 2016. In 2014, Yago started his Dois Dedos de Teologia channel on YouTube, presenting Calvinist content and addressing various topics from his perspective, often showing the literature that supports his speeches.

Also in 2013, he was considered one of the 20 most influential Christians on the Brazilian internet, but it was after the publication of A Máfia dos Beggars, in 2019, that Martins began participating in the mainstream media to discuss issues related to poverty, homelessness, and other religious topics. In 2020, Comunhão, the country's largest-circulation evangelical magazine, published: "At 27 years old, he became an internet phenomenon, [...] leading millions of people to reflect on current issues." In 2021, Portuguese rock star Tiago Cavaco described him in his work Arame barpado no paraíso as "a fair theological public phenomenon."

== The Beggar Mafia ==
"Homeless people are not beings who have always experienced extreme circumstances and who, therefore, have exiled themselves: they were once what we are today; what is often missing is finding someone who truly notices them."

Martins spent a year as a homeless person to understand the reasons that would explain the lack of success of the social work carried out by his own church with the homeless, and with this, he wrote "The Mafia of Beggars: How Charity Increases Poverty". For Martins, there are many groups of volunteers who deliver donations and food to homeless people and, what should be an act of kindness, ends up becoming complacency. In an interview with Jovem Pan, he says that "Some people who are on the streets are there because there is a culture of unrestricted and impersonal charity. If we are not involved in work with homeless people or charitable actions, we may not see this and, depending on how we interpret life, we may not even believe it". The central thesis of The Beggars' Mafia is that a community of "parasites of poverty" has taken advantage of the unrestricted and impersonal charity that, according to the author, floods the streets of the country's big cities, harming those who truly depend on emergency aid.

For the author, the process of transforming homeless men occurs through personal commitment to restoring dignity: "If we want to convince a man to leave the street, we need to be instrumental in a long-term effort to make him recover his sense of dignity." A critic of disengaged almsgiving, Martins argues that beggars should be helped primarily through involvement, in the construction of therapeutic communities: "Interpret calls for almsgiving as calls for involvement. Establish serious human contact, eye to eye, and take by the hand those who are unable to walk. Almsgiving is not necessarily the most Christian stance to take when faced with the poor: miraculous healing — in the most routine ways that miracles happen in hearts — is."

After the book was published, he was invited as a visiting fellow at the Center for Social Flourishing at the Acton Institute in Michigan, where he lived for 6 months in 2024 to research the lives of the homeless population in the United States.

In addition, a bill based on the book was filed and approved in a city of São Paulo state. With the law, the municipal public administration now requires that companies that win bids have a small percentage of workers from homeless backgrounds (if they do not fill the vacancies, then people who have been unemployed for more than 3 years). The project was a way for companies that are receiving money from the State to contribute to the reintegration of the homeless population into the job market.

== Other books ==
Yago Martins has written more than 20 books, published in Brazil and Portugal. Among them are Churches that silence women (2024), Shameless Christians (2023), Political idolatry (2023), At the dawn of the gods (2020) and The reformed Christian (2018).

== Short film ==
In 2020, she starred in the short film Sepah: The Islamic Revolutionary Guard Corps, based on facts about religious persecution in the Middle East, produced by Iran Alive Ministries in partnership with the production company Light in Action and with the support of The Voice of the Martyrs. The short film tells a true story based on the life of an Iranian commander, responsible for the extermination of the underground church, who puts his life at risk when he begins to question his beliefs. The cast includes Iranian actress Ferdos Heidari, whose family fled Iran due to religious persecution. Despite being filmed in English, the entire film was produced and recorded in Brazil.
