= Congregational singing =

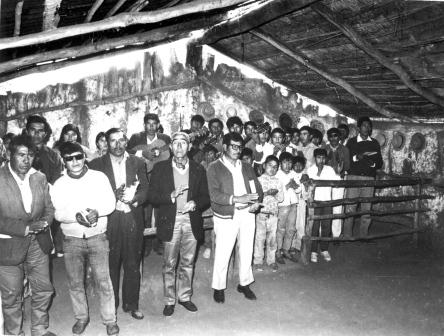
Congregational singing at a church in La Matanza, Argentina, 1972

Congregational singing is the practice of the congregation participating in the music of a church, either in the form of hymns or a metrical Psalms or a free form Psalm or in the form of the office of the liturgy (for example Gregorian chants). It is contrasted with music being sung exclusively by a choir or cantor(s). Congregational singing was largely the invention of the Protestant Reformation. Before then, singing in churches, especially in larger urban churches, was largely left to professionals. The reformers in Strasbourg, in particular, reduced the church service largely to a sermon bookended by congregational singing and prayers.

== See also ==
- Singing (meeting)
