= Singing (meeting) =

Church members gathering for singing hymns

A singing (also known as a church singing or a hymn singing) is a Christian meeting in which church members gather together to sing hymns. These are often held on Sunday afternoons or Sunday evenings, being seen as a way to sanctify the Lord's Day. Singings are common in churches of Conservative Anabaptism such as the Apostolic Christian Church, as well as those of Methodist denominations such as the First Congregational Methodist Church. The attendance of singings is seen as a way for youth to meet those of the opposite gender to pursue a courtship that will eventually lead to Christian marriage; there are singings for different age groups, however, and certain singings are for married couples to worship God together. These singings bring together many Christians and in some areas, range from sixty to eighty people.

A singing for young adults at the Annual Meeting of the Old German Baptist Brethren Church, New Conference

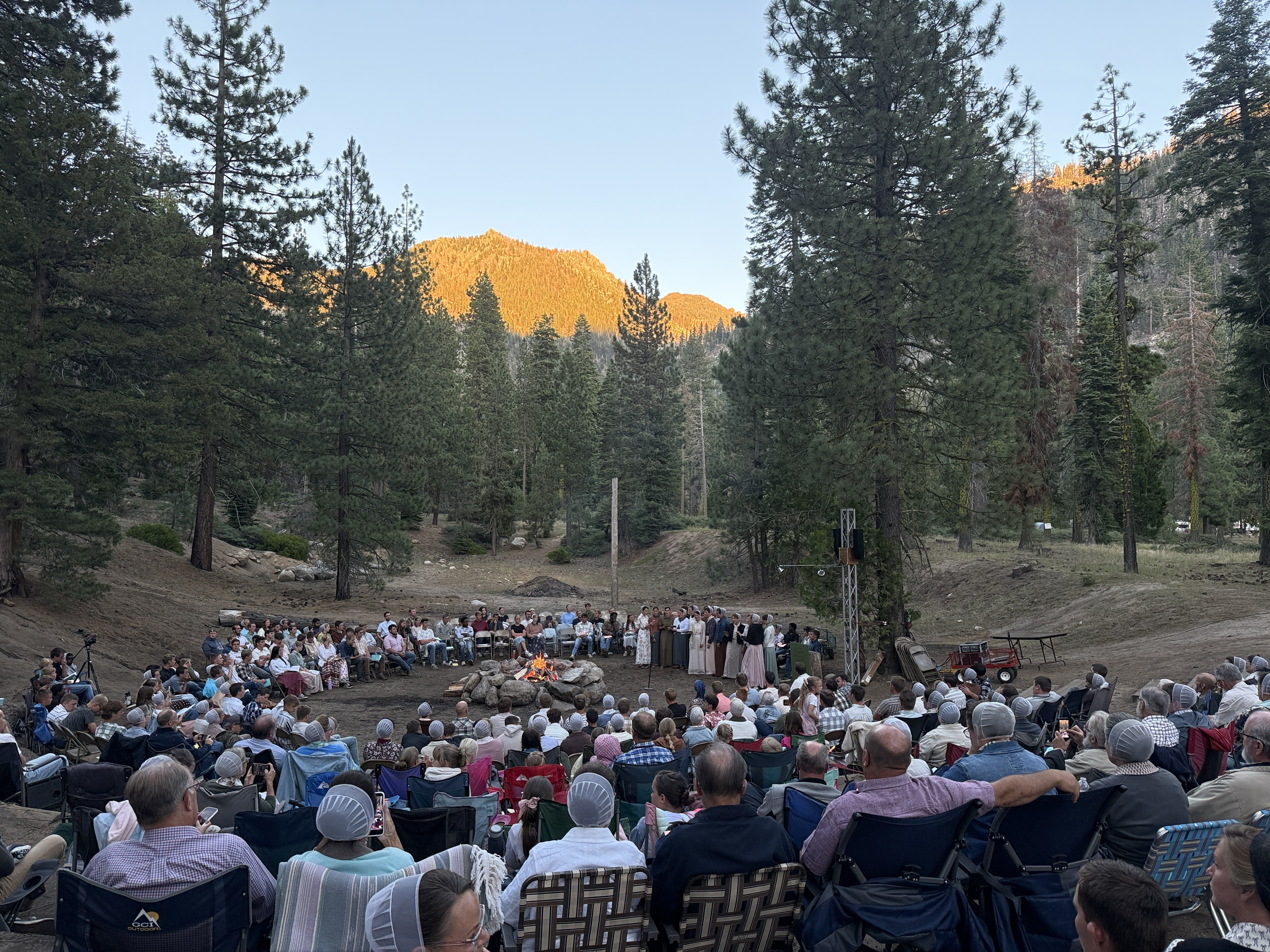
Schwarzenau Brethren ladies of the Modesto Old German Baptist Brethren Church at a singing in Camp Peaceful Pines in Riverbank, California

== See also ==
- Congregational singing
