= Covenant Life Church =

Church in Gaithersburg, Maryland, US

Coordinates: 39°9′14″N 77°9′5″W

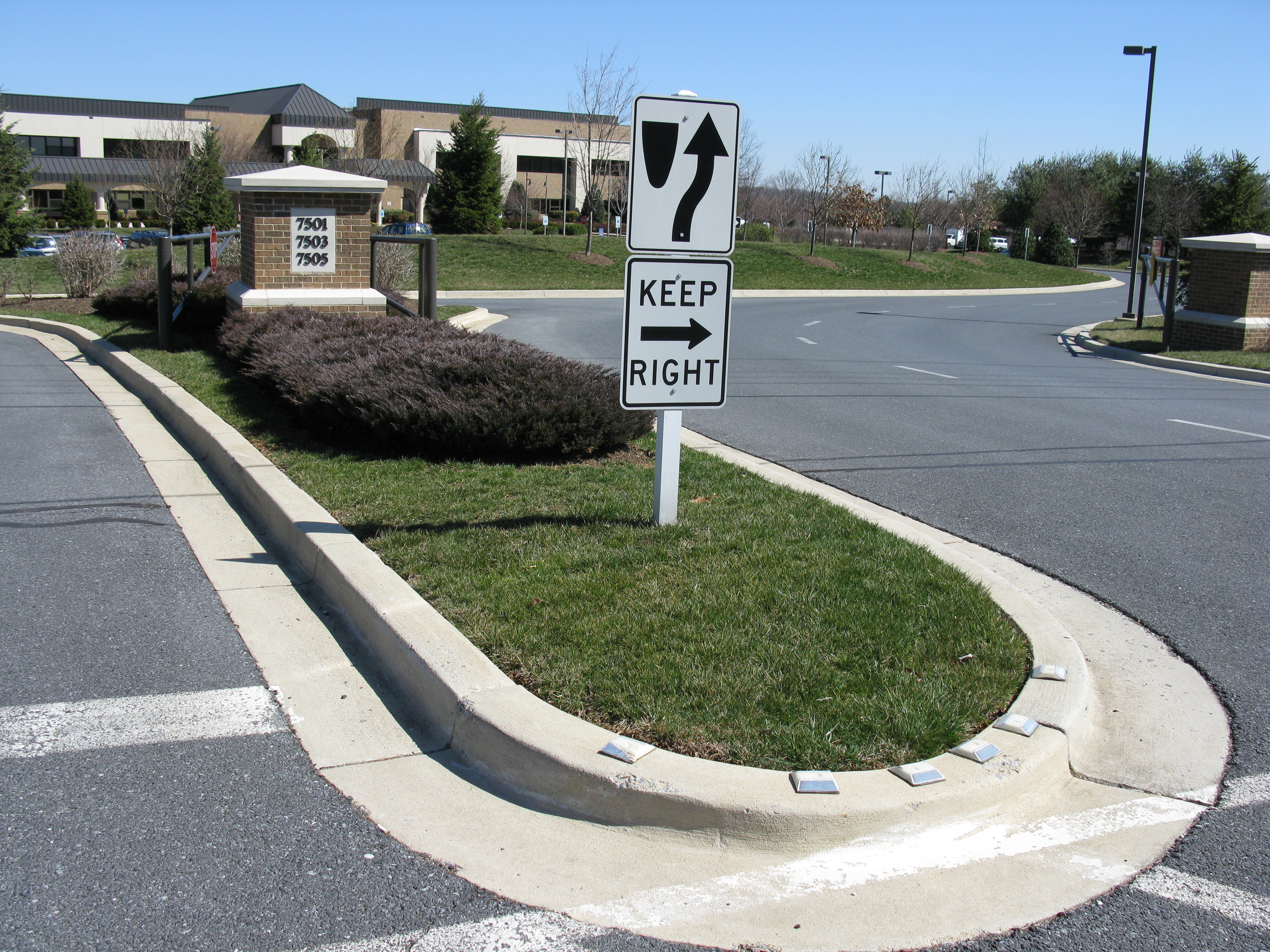
Covenant Life Church entrance

Covenant Life Church is an evangelical megachurch in Gaithersburg, Maryland. Established in 1977, it spawned other churches and was the flagship church of Sovereign Grace Churches until it left the group in December 2012.

== History ==
Covenant Life Church had its roots in a citywide charismatic prayer meeting called Take and Give (TAG) which ran from 1970 to 1979. TAG began as a small Bible study led by Lydia Little, a Washington, DC area resident who had experienced the Jesus People revival in California and wanted to see similar renewal brought to local young people. TAG continued to grow in numbers with the Tuesday night meetings moving from the Blair High School auditorium to a larger auditorium space at Christ Church of Washington. Larry Tomczak and C.J. Mahaney became the main teachers with Jim Orban (eventual son-in-law of Lydia Little) leading worship and a number of other young people taking on other leadership responsibilities as the group grew. At its largest point TAG attracted over 2,000 people, primarily young attendees under the age of 25.

In 1977 a small group of people (55 at the first meeting, many of whom were TAG attendees) began to gather in the basement of a suburban Maryland home. Simultaneously, the TAG ministry began to wind down and met for the last time in December 1979.

The young church called itself Gathering of Believers. As it grew in size, it met in different schools and facilities around Montgomery County. For a couple of years the church held services at the Cedar Club building on Muncaster Mill Road. It then shifted to a decentralized model with separate groups meeting in College Park, Gaithersburg, Silver Spring, and Wheaton. In the mid-'80s the groups consolidated as Covenant Life Church and met together at Magruder High School. In September 1993 the church opened its new facility on a 45-acre campus located at 7501 Muncaster Mill Road. It expanded to its current size and unique worship space in 2002 under the planning of Dennis Kowal Architects of Somerville, New Jersey.

The initial church group practiced "co-equal" leadership with a highly participatory congregation. Church life centered on numerous small groups meeting in member homes. Over the first few years Larry Tomczak and C. J. Mahaney increasingly assumed larger leadership roles. C.J. became lead pastor of the church while Larry provided leadership for a growing association of churches that were either planted by Covenant Life (13 churches in multiple states) or "adopted" on the basis of shared doctrinal convictions and relational ties. Originally called People of Destiny International, the association's name changed over time to PDI, then Sovereign Grace Ministries, and finally to Sovereign Grace Churches (2014). In the early '90s C.J. was selected to lead the association of churches in addition to his responsibilities as senior pastor of Covenant Life. Tomczak relocated to Atlanta in 1996 to plant a new church and left the association by 1998. He later stated that the increasingly Calvinistic theology was a major factor in this parting of the ways.

Mahaney held the role of senior pastor for over 20 years, and in September 2004 passed this role to Joshua Harris. C.J. continued as a mentor while leading Sovereign Grace, whose offices were located in the same facility.

In 2011, documents written by a former Sovereign Grace leader were circulated online that triggered sharp disagreements between leaders and internal strife within the church. Despite a formal reconciliation process mediated by Ambassadors of Reconciliation, in December 2012 members of Covenant Life Church voted to end their formal association with Sovereign Grace Ministries, citing numerous differences, but especially noting differences on issues related to church polity.

Joshua Harris and C.J. Mahaney "resigned from the council of The Gospel Coalition (TGC) in 2014. Also in 2014, a former church member was convicted of sexually abusing three boys in their homes in the 1980s and early 1990s. None of the abuse occurred at Covenant Life Church.

In 2014, a civil lawsuit against Covenant Life Church and Sovereign Grace Ministries alleging a cover-up of child sexual abuse was dismissed in Maryland. The case was dismissed by a lower court with prejudice since the statute of limitations for a civil suit in Maryland had passed. The case was finally dismissed by Maryland's highest court on September 22, 2014.

In January 2015 Joshua Harris announced plans to step down as lead pastor and pursue formal graduate theological studies at Regent College in Vancouver, BC. He stated in an interview that "the isolation of Covenant Life, and of a small cluster of churches of which it was a part, may have fed leadership mistakes, including the decision of pastors — himself among them — to handle a child sexual abuse case internally instead of going to police."

In December 2015, Covenant Life Church voted to call P.J. Smyth (Johannesburg, South Africa) to be its new lead pastor. After a lengthy immigration process, he and his family received their visas in October 2016 and he was installed on January 29, 2017.

Early in 2018, tensions developed within the Board of Elders. Outside leaders and church members were invited to help resolve differences related to preaching and polity, but in July the elders and Pastor Smyth decided to part ways. Covenant Life's Board of Elders continues to provide leadership for the church. Smyth plans to plant a new church in the DC Metro region. When Smyth left the church, many middle aged people, and parents with children left the church too and decided to follow Smyth and help him start a new church.

== Educational support for parents ==
Covenant Life School, an accredited K-12 day school, is housed in Covenant Life's facility. Over 300 students currently attend the day school, which is accredited by the Association of Christian Schools International and the Middle States Association of Colleges and Schools.

Covenant Life School's mascot is known as the cougar. Their athletics program has won several championships.

Covenant Life Church also provides a Family Schools Program to support homeschooling parents in the church and community.

== Church plants ==
Covenant Life has over 25 years sent out 13 church plants to many cities in the U.S. and a few abroad, including Cleveland (1982), Chicago, San Diego, Mexico, Texas, and the Philippines (1983-1984).

In 1984, Covenant Life Church planted Covenant Fellowship Church in Glen Mills, Pennsylvania.

In 2006, Covenant Life Church planted Sovereign Grace Church of Frederick in Frederick, Maryland.

In 2008, Covenant Life Church planted Iglesia Gracia Soberana de Gaithersburg in Gaithersburg, Maryland. Iglesia Gracia Soberana de Gaithersburg is the second Spanish-speaking Sovereign Grace church in the USA. Its pastor is José Mercado.
