= Mark Matlock =

American Writer

- Citizenship: American
- Education: Biola University
- Occupations: Author; Motivational speaker Youth pastor
- Spouse: Jade Matlock
- Writing career
- Language: English
- Genre: Christian literature
- Subject: Youth ministry
- Notable works: Dirty Faith; Freshman: The College Student's Guide to Developing Wisdom "Living A Life That Matters" "Real World Parents" "Raising Wise Children" "Don't Buy The Lie" "Smart Faith with JP Moreland" "Faith For Exiles with David Kinnaman"
- Website: www.wisdomworks.comwww.youthspecialties.com

Mark Matlock (born 1969) is the former executive director of youth specialties and the founder of WisdomWorks Ministries. He is an ordained minister and youth pastor who lives in Dallas. He coauthored the book Dirty Faith with Audio Adrenaline. He also wrote Freshman: The College Student's Guide to Developing Wisdom. In this book, Matlock gives the following definition for wisdom: "the human capacity to understand life from God's perspective"; in the book Lost in Transition: Becoming Spiritually Prepared for College, Tommy McGregor praised Matlock's definition for recognizing that "true wisdom comes from God." Matlock spoke at the 2006 Creation Festival, the world's biggest Christian music festival. He also spoke to an audience of 11,000 Christian youth at DCLA that year. In 2011, he spoke at the Nazarene Youth Conference in Louisville, Kentucky. Mark is the main speaker and founder of Planet Wisdom, which has featured Chris Coleman, Mercy Me, The Digital Age, Addison Road The Swift, The Skit Guys (Eddie James & Tommy Woodard), Fred Lynch, Sean McDowell and Heather Flies.
