= Salomão Coxi =

Angolan footballer

Personal information
- Full name: Salomão Ludy Luvunga Coxi
- Date of birth: 24 July 2002 (age 24)
- Place of birth: Luanda, Angola
- Height: 1.82 m (6 ft 0 in)
- Position: Midfielder

Team information
- Current team: UE Santa Coloma

Youth career
- 2013–2015: Quinta do Conde
- 2015: Arrentela
- 2015–2018: Sporting
- 2018–2019: Tondela
- 2020: Boavista

Senior career*
| Years | Team | Apps | (Gls) |
| 2020–2021 | Al Wahda | 0 | (0) |
| 2021-2022 | Hatta | 0 | (0) |
| 2022-2023 | Cartaxo | 0 | (0) |
| 2023- | UE Santa Coloma | 3 | (0) |
- * Club domestic league appearances and goals as of 17 April 2023

Salomão Ludy Luvunga Coxi (born 24 July 2002) is an Angolan professional footballer who plays as a midfielder for UE Santa Coloma in Andorra.

== Career statistics ==
=== Club ===
As of 24 February 2021.

| Club | Season | League | | | Cup | | Continental | | Other | | Total | |
| Club | Season | Division | Apps | Goals | Apps | Goals | Apps | Goals | Apps | Goals | Apps | Goals |
|---|---|---|---|---|---|---|---|---|---|---|---|---|
| Al Wahda | 2020–21 | UAE Pro League | 0 | 0 | 1 (Note: Appearances in the UAE League Cup) | 0 | 0 | 0 | 0 | 0 | 1 | 0 |
| Career total | | | 0 | 0 | 1 | 0 | 0 | 0 | 0 | 0 | 1 | 0 |
