= Jason Evert =

American writer (born 1975)

- Born: 1975 (age 50–51)
- Education: Franciscan University of Steubenville
- Occupations: Author, chastity speaker
- Years active: 1999-present
- Spouse: Crystalina Evert née Padilla
- Website: www.chastityproject.com

Jason Evert is a Catholic author and chastity speaker. He founded Totus Tuus Press and Chastity Project, an organization that promotes chastity primarily to high school and college students.

Evert earned a Master of Theology from the Franciscan University of Steubenville, with undergraduate degrees in theology and counseling, with a minor in philosophy.

== Bibliography ==
- Pure Love (1999)
- Did Jesus Have a Last Name? (2005)
- Answering Jehovah's Witnesses (2006)
- Theology of the Body for Teens (2006)
- Pure Manhood (2007)
- If You Really Loved Me: 100 Questions on Dating, Relationships, and Sexual Purity (2009)
- Theology of His Body/Theology of Her Body (2009)
- Purity 365: Daily Reflections on True Love (2009)
- Raising Pure Teens (2010)
- Theology of the Body for Teens, Middle School Edition (2011)
- How to Find Your Soulmate Without Losing Your Soul (2011)
- Pure Faith A Prayer Book for Teens (2013)
- Saint John Paul the Great: His Five Loves (2014)
- You: Life, Love, and the Theology of the Body (2016)
- A Guide to the Dating Project (2018)
- Theology of the Body in One Hour (2018)
- Pure Intimacy (2019)
- The Dating Blueprint (2019)
- Forged (2020)
- Male, Female, Other? A Catholic Guide to Understanding Gender (2022)
- Envision: Theology of the Body for Middle School Students (2024)
- Male, Female, Other? A Christian Guide to Understanding Gender (2024)
