= C. J. Mahaney =

American Christian minister

C.J. Mahaney
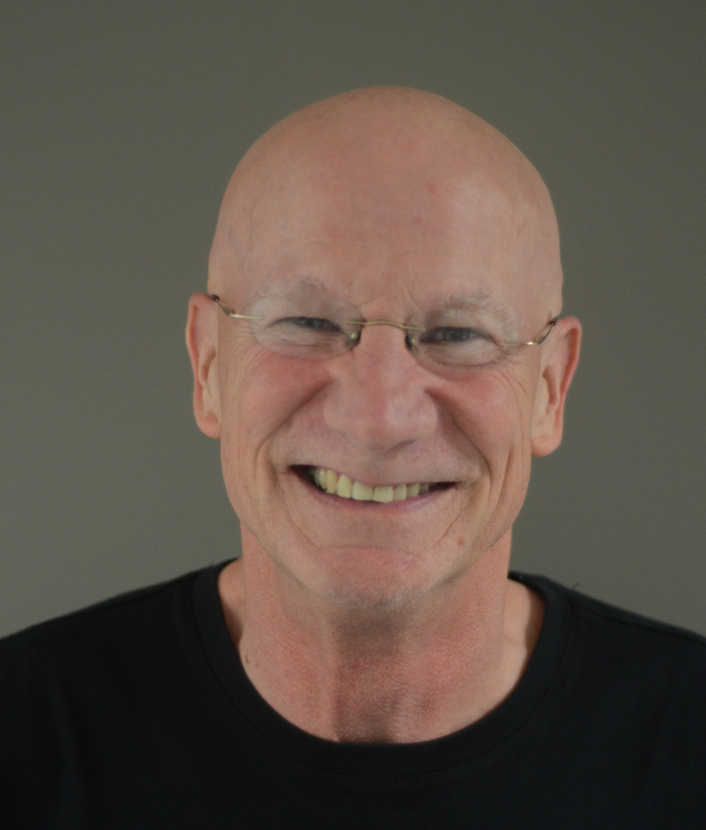
- Born: September 21, 1953 (age 73)
- Occupation: Pastor
- Spouse: Carolyn

Ecclesiastical career
- Religion: Reformed Christianity
- Church: Sovereign Grace Church

Charles Joseph Mahaney is an American Christian minister. He is the senior pastor at Sovereign Grace Church of Louisville, and was formerly president of Sovereign Grace Ministries, now known as Sovereign Grace Churches. He was one of the founding pastors and leaders of Covenant Life Church, in Gaithersburg, Maryland.

Under Mahaney's leadership, Sovereign Grace Church of Louisville is a member of Sovereign Grace Churches and works with the Southern Baptist Convention for training and Christian mission work. Mahaney resigned from the presidency of Sovereign Grace Ministries in 2013 in order to plant Sovereign Grace Church of Louisville.

A 2012 class-action sex abuse lawsuit was filed against Sovereign Grace Ministries and listed Mahaney as a defendant. The lawsuit was dismissed due to the statute of limitations; Mahaney released a public statement explicitly denying all claims in the suit.

== Early life and education ==
Mahaney was born in Maryland into a Catholic household, the middle child of five. He was the son of a metalworker in Takoma Park, Maryland.

Mahaney attended Springbrook High School in Silver Spring, Maryland. He reports having been converted to Protestantism in 1972 at age 18 by a friend who shared his faith. He says that a newspaper ad motivated him to join a local prayer meeting known as Take and Give, which evolved into Covenant Life Church.

== Career ==
In 1974, aged 20, Mahaney met Larry Tomczak, with whom he led and taught a large local prayer group named Take And Give (TAG), started by Lydia Little. He says his only reading in theology at that time consisted of the Bible and The Late, Great Planet Earth by Hal Lindsey.

In 1977, Mahaney became senior pastor of what had evolved into Covenant Life Church. He cites his reading of the works of 19th-century Baptist leader Charles H. Spurgeon and the Reformed theology of John Calvin as influences.

Mahaney was the senior pastor of Covenant Life Church for 27 years, after which the senior pastor role went to Joshua Harris (on September 18, 2004). In 2012 he planted a church on the east side of Louisville, Kentucky, Sovereign Grace Church of Louisville, with Bob Kauflin, Brian Chesemore, Jeff Purswell, and Gary Ricucci. In 2006, Ligon Duncan, Mark Dever, Albert Mohler, and Mahaney founded the biennial Together for the Gospel conference.

Mahaney announced that he was pulling out of the 2014 T4G, due to his perception of the distractions his continuing presence would bring from ongoing lawsuits against his Sovereign Grace Ministries. He returned for the 2016 conference, but withdrew again in 2018.

As of 2015, Mahaney was the senior pastor of Sovereign Grace Church of Louisville. He resigned from the presidency of Sovereign Grace Ministries in April 2013, while planting the church.

=== Voluntary leave of absence ===
In June 2011 Mahaney voluntarily took a leave of absence for self-examination after charges were leveled against him by a former Sovereign Grace pastor. His leave occurred in the wake of accusations from a former top Sovereign Grace pastor who distributed hundreds of e-mails and internal church documents that portrayed Mahaney as focusing on the sins of others below him in the church hierarchy. After Mahaney's departure, the Sovereign Grace board gave a strong vote of confidence to him, saying that he is "a qualified minister of the gospel and this board approves his pastoral and teaching ministry."

In April 2012, a report was released after an extensive outside review performed by Ambassadors of Reconciliation, in response to the charges brought against Mahaney.

Mahaney continued to serve as president of Sovereign Grace Ministries. Covenant Life Church, the church Mahaney co-founded and pastored for 27 years, left Sovereign Grace Ministries.

== Dismissed sexual abuse lawsuit ==
In 2012, a class action lawsuit was filed against Sovereign Grace Ministries, alleging that leaders, including Mahaney, had covered up child sexual abuse. The lawsuit was dismissed with prejudice in May 2013. The Maryland Court of Appeals also dismissed the case after finding that the plaintiff's lawyer had filed the appeal too early. After the case was dismissed, a former volunteer at CLC, Nathaniel Morales, 56, was convicted of sexually abusing three young boys between 1983 and 1991. During the trial, Mahaney's brother-in-law, former pastor Grant Layman, admitted that he did not report sex abuse claims to authorities but tried to handle them within the church. In February 2016, Mahaney was the subject of a Washingtonian magazine article, titled "The Sex Scandal That Devastated a Suburban Megachurch - Inside the Rise and Fall of Sovereign Grace."

== Personal life ==
Mahaney met Carolyn Layman in the 1970s, while he was teaching at Take and Give and she was working as a secretary at a Christian conference ministry in Sarasota, Florida, and they soon married. Mahaney has one son and three daughters.

== Selected publications ==
- Don't Waste Your Sports, Crossway Publishing 2010, ISBN 978-1433522475
- Living the Cross Centered Life, Multnomah Books 2006, ISBN 978-1590525784
- Humility: True Greatness Multnomah Books 2005, ISBN 978-1590523261
- Sex, Romance, and the Glory of God, Crossway Publishing 2004, ISBN 978-1581346244
- Worldliness: Resisting the Seduction of a Fallen World, Crossway Publishing 2010, ISBN 978-1433502804
- Christ Our Mediator, Multnomah Books 2006, ISBN 978-1590523643
- The Cross Centered Life, Multnomah Books 2002, ISBN 978-1590520451
- Why Small Groups?, Sovereign Grace Ministries 1996, ISBN 978-1881039068
- Disciplines for Life, People of Destiny International 1994, ISBN 978-1881039006
