= Dannah Gresh =

American christian writer (born 1967)

- Born: 1967 (age 58–59)
- Education: B.A. in Liberal Arts, Cedarville University
- Occupations: Author, public speaker
- Spouse: Bob Gresh
- Writing career
- Language: English
- Genre: Christian literature
- Subjects: Modesty; Parenting; Premarital sex; Sexual abstinence
- Website: www.dannahgresh.com

Dannah Gresh (born 1967) is an author, speaker, and the founder of True Girl, a Christian tween event for mothers and daughters ages 8–12. She is also the founder of Pure Freedom, a ministry which focuses on sexual theology, purity, and holiness for teens. Books written by Gresh include And the Bride Wore White: Seven Secrets to Sexual Purity and Lies Young Women Believe: And the Truth that Sets Them Free which she co-authored with Nancy Leigh DeMoss.

== Life ==
Gresh has said her interest in promoting abstinence before marriage originated from an experience she had at age 15, when she had sex with a teenage boy. After having sex, Gresh said she felt anxious and depressed.

Gresh attended Cedarville University, where she met her husband.

She lives in State College, Pennsylvania with her husband, Bob.

== Recognition ==
In 2021, She was named the Cedarville University "2021 Alumna of the Year."

== Beliefs about human sexuality ==
Gresh promotes abstinence before marriage with an emphasis for young women. Additional views on human sexuality include:

- Abstinence is the only form of HPV prevention which is 100% effective
- A person can get addicted and bonded to the people they have sex with
- When a virgin woman's hymen breaks during intercourse, it forms a blood covenant between the woman, her husband, and God
- Immodest dress is sinful, causing men and boys to stumble
- Focusing on Jesus helps overcome PMS symptoms
- By submitting to authority, women earn God's protective covering
- A woman's value comes from fulfilling her designated role as a wife and mother
- Greater connection to God will stop the desire to masturbate
- Women should save every part of their heart and body for their future husband, because sex before marriage is a sin

== Published works ==
- And the Bride Wore White: Seven Secrets to Sexual Purity. 2000.
- Secret Keeper, 2002, 2011 (revised and re-released)
- Pursuing the Pearl, 2003
- Secret Keeper Girl: Eight Great Dates (About Modesty & Beauty), 2004
- Secret Keeper Devos, 2005, 2011 (revised and re-released)
- The Secret of the Lord,, 2006
- Five Little Questions That Reveal the Life God Designed For You, 2007
- Lies Young Women Believe (with Nancy Leigh DeMoss), 2008
- Secret Keeper Girl: Eight Great Dates (About Friendship), 2008, 2013 (revised and re-released)
- My Best Friend, Jesus, 2008
- Danika's Totally Terrible Toss, 2008
- "T" is for AnTONIa, 2008
- Just Call Me Kate, 2008
- Yuzi's False Alarm, 2008
- 8 Great Dates For Moms and Daughters. Eugene, Or: Harvest House Publishers. 2010. ISBN 978-0-7369-3014-7.
- Six Ways To Keep The "Little" In Your Girl, 2010
- The One Year Mother-Daughter Devo, 2010
- What Are You Waiting For? The One Thing No One Ever Tells You About Sex (1st ed.). Colorado Springs, Colo: Waterbrook Press. 2011. ISBN 978-1-60142-331-3.
  - Published in Spanish as ¿Por Qué Es Mejor Esperar?: Lo Que Nadie Te Dice Acerca Del SexoThe One Thing No One Ever Tells You about Sex. Kregel Publications. February 4, 2020. ISBN 978-0-8254-5925-2.
- Six Ways to Keep the "Good" in Your Boy: Guiding Your Son from His Tweens to His Teens. Harvest House Publishers. February 1, 2012. ISBN 978-0-7369-4580-6.; co-written with Bob Gresh
- One Year Teen Devo, 2013
- Get Lost: Your Guide to Finding True Love, 2013
- A Girl's Guide to Best Friends and Mean Girls, 2013
- Pulling Back the Shades (with Dr. Juli Slattery), 2014
- Secret Keeper Girl Pajama Party, 2014
- A Girl's Guide to Understanding Boys, 2014
- 8 Great Dates for Dads and Daughters: Talking With Your Daughter About Understanding Boys (with Bob Gresh), 2014
- Raising Body Confident Daughters: 8 Conversations to have with your tween, 2015
- It's Great to Be a Girl! A Guide to Your Changing Body (with Suzy Weibel), 2015
- It's Great to Be a Guy! God Has a Plan for You and Your Body (with Jarrod Sechler), 2016
- Dannah Gresh Version (Bible Translation), 2016
- The 20 Hardest Questions Every Mom Faces: Praying Your Way to Realistic, Biblical Answers, 2016
- Secret Keeper Girl, 2017
- Madres críen hijas satisfechas imagen (Spanish edition), 2017
- Lies Women Believe: And the Truth that Sets Them Free (with Nancy DeMoss Wolgemuth), 2018
- Lies Young Women Believe: And the Truth that Sets Them Free (with Nancy DeMoss Wolgemuth), 2018
- Lies Young Women Believe Study Guide: And the Truth that Sets Them Free (with Nancy DeMoss Wolgemuth and Erin Davis), 2018
- Lies Girls Believe: And the Truth that Sets Them Free. Chicago: Moody Publishers. 2019. ISBN 978-0-8024-9401-6.; with Nancy DeMoss Wolgemuth
  - Published in Spanish as Mentiras que las niñas creen: Y la Verdad Que las Hace Libres (in Spanish). 2020.
- A Mom's Guide to Lies Girls Believe: And the Truth that Sets Them Free (Lies We Believe) (with Nancy DeMoss Wolgemuth), 2019
  - Published in Spanish as Mentiras que las niñas creen, Guía para mamás: Y La Verdad Que Las Hace Libres (in Spanish). 2020.
- True Girl Mom-Daughter Devos: with Coloring Experience, 2019
- True Girl: Discover the Secrets of True Beauty, 2019
- Habakkuk: Remembering God's Faithfulness When He Seems Silent, 2020
- Ruth: Becoming a Girl of Loyalty (True Girl Bible Study), 2021
- 8 Great Dates for Dads and Daughters: How to Talk About the Differences Between Boys and Girls (with Bob Gresh), 2021
- 8 Great Dates for Moms and Daughters: How to Talk About Cool Fashion, True Beauty, and Dignity, 2021
- Raising a Body-Confident Daughter: 8 Godly Truths to Share with Your Girl, 2021
- Talking with Your Daughter About Best Friends and Mean Girls: Discovering God's Plan for Making Good Friendship Choices (8 Great Dates), 2021
- Miriam: Becoming a Girl of Courage (True Girl Bible Study), 2021
