= Eric Ludy =

American writer

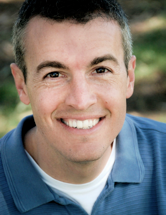
- Born: Eric Winston Ludy; December 17, 1970 (age 55); Hinsdale, Illinois
- Occupations: Writer, speaker, president of Ellerslie Mission Society
- Spouse: Leslie Ludy (m. 1994)
- Children: Hudson, Harper, Kipling, Avonlea, Lily, Rees
- Writing career
- Genre: Christianity
- Subjects: Christian life, manhood, prayer
- Notable works: When God Writes Your Love Story, The Bravehearted Gospel, Wrestling Prayer
- Website: ericludy.com

Eric Winston Ludy (born December 17, 1970) is an author, speaker and president of Ellerslie Mission Society. He is also the senior pastor at the Church at Ellerslie and the lead instructor at Ellerslie Leadership Training in Windsor, Colorado. Ludy is the author of more than a dozen books, many of which were co-authored with his wife, Leslie Ludy.

== Biography ==
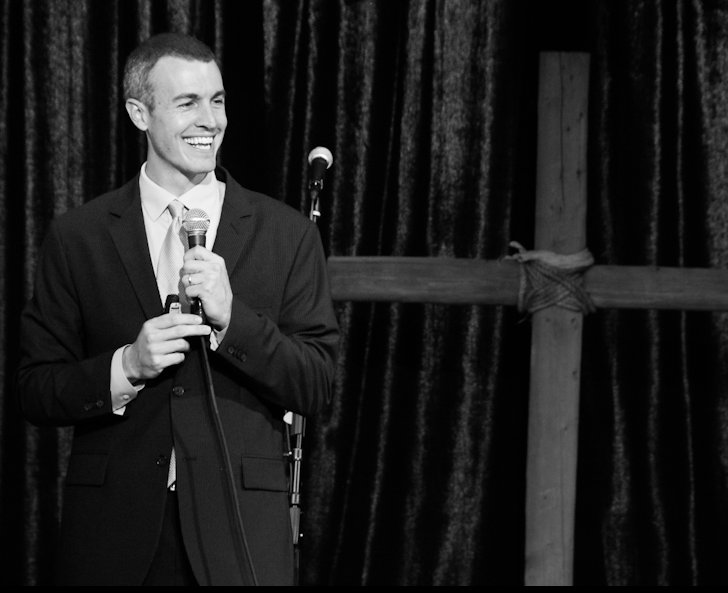
Ludy speaking at the Church at Ellerslie.

Eric Ludy's spouse is author Leslie Ludy. The two were married in December 1994 in Denver, Colorado. Their love story garnered much attention from the Christian community and was detailed in their book When Dreams Come True.

Eric Ludy's first book was published when he was 24 years old. From that point forward Ludy began traveling around the world, speaking on the principles of the Christian life. Over a three-year period from 2005 to 2008, Ludy, along with his wife, Leslie, wrote 11 books. Ludy's books and teachings are used in Christian training curriculums by organizations such as CareNet, Youth With A Mission, and Compassion International.

In 2009, Ludy became President of Ellerslie Mission Society.

Eric and Leslie have six children. Four of the Ludy's six children are adopted, and this strong support of adoption and orphan rescue has been a hallmark of Eric Ludy's ministry and life.

== Bibliography ==
- His Perfect Faithfulness (1996; with Leslie Ludy). Harvest Books. ISBN 0965625117.
- Romance God’s Way (1997; with Leslie Ludy). Makarios Publishing. ISBN 0965625109.
- When God Writes Your Love Story (1998; with Leslie Ludy). Multnomah Publishers. ISBN 1929125003.
- When Dreams Come True (2000; with Leslie Ludy). Multnomah Publishers. ISBN 1590523539.
- God's Gift to Women (2003). Multnomah Publishers. ISBN 1590522729.
- When God Writes Your Life Story (2004; with; Leslie Ludy). Multnomah Publishers. ISBN 1590523393.
- Teaching True Love to a Sex-at-13 Generation (2005; with Leslie Ludy). Thomas Nelson Publishers. ISBN 084994256X.
- A Perfect Wedding (2006; with Leslie Ludy). Harvest House Publishers. ISBN 0736915664.
- The First 90 Days of Marriage (2006; with Leslie Ludy). Thomas Nelson Publishers. ISBN 0849905249.
- Meet Mr. Smith (2007; with Leslie Ludy). Thomas Nelson Publishers. ISBN 0849905435.
- The Bravehearted Gospel (2007). Harvest House Publishers. ISBN 0736921648.
- Wrestling Prayer (2009; with Leslie Ludy). Harvest House Publishers. ISBN 0736921656.
