= Leslie Ludy =

American journalist

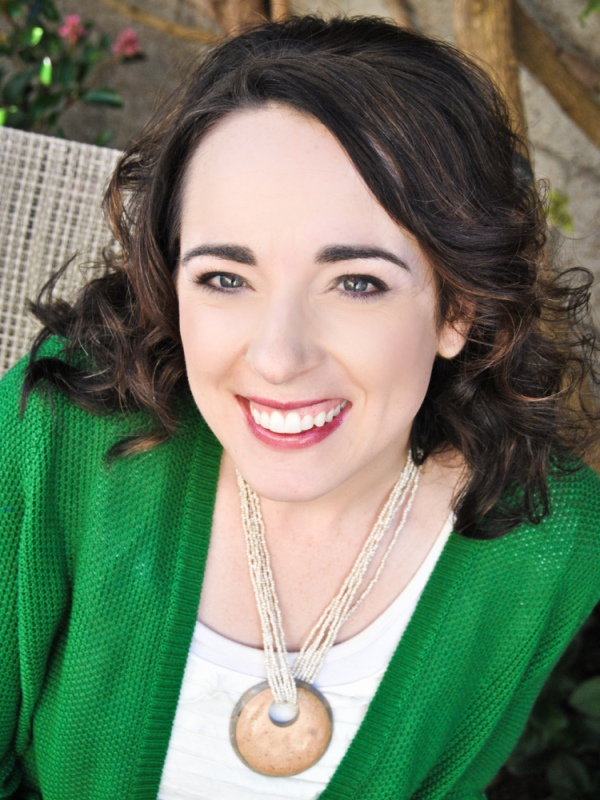
- Born: Leslie Ludy; December 16, 1975 (age 50); Nacogdoches, Texas, U.S.
- Occupations: Author, speaker, editor
- Spouse: Eric Ludy (m. 1994)
- Children: 6
- Writing career
- Genre: Christianity
- Notable work: When God Writes Your Love Story

Leslie Ludy (born December 16, 1975) is an American Christian author, speaker, and editor. She and her husband Eric Ludy wrote When God Writes Your Love Story. She has been a speaker at hundreds of conferences, colleges, and events, as well as a guest on many well-known media venues. She is a director of Set Apart Girl (setapartgirl), an online Christian magazine for young women.

== Biography ==
Leslie married her husband, Eric Ludy, in December 1994 in Denver, Colorado. Their story garnered much attention from the Christian community and was detailed in their books When Dreams Come True and When God Writes Your Love Story. Leslie Ludy's first book was published when she was 19 years old. From that point forward Ludy began traveling the world, speaking to various Christians on the principles of the Christian life.

Over a three-year period from 2005 to 2008, Ludy and Eric wrote 11 books. It was in this prolific season that she fine-tuned her articulation of what she terms "set-apart femininity". She serves as the executive director of Set Apart Girl, an organization that provides books, resources, conferences, and training for young Christian women. Her book, Set-Apart Femininity, published by Harvest House, garnered much acclaim and was a finalist for the Retailer's Choice Award in 2009, in the Women's Non-Fiction category. Paula Friedrichsen of the Christian Broadcasting Network said in a review of Set-Apart Femininity, "Leslie Ludy is a fresh voice in an age of compromise, and a passionate leader of young women everywhere. This book will appeal to those who believe that the lines have become blurred between the church and the world — and would be perfect for a discussion group or book club."

In 2009, the Ludys launched Ellerslie Leadership Training, a collegiate-level discipleship training program designed for Christian men and women who seek to live out the Christian life in a world-impacting way. Eric and Leslie live in Windsor, Colorado with their six children.

== Bibliography ==
- His Perfect Faithfulness (1996; with Eric Ludy). Harvest Books. ISBN 0965625117.
- Romance God’s Way (1997; with Eric Ludy). Makarios Publishing. ISBN 0965625109.
- When God Writes Your Love Story (1998; with Eric Ludy). Multnomah Publishers. ISBN 1929125003.
- When Dreams Come True (2000; with Eric Ludy). Multnomah Publishers. ISBN 1590523539.
- Authentic Beauty (2003) Multnomah Publishers. ISBN 159052991X.
- When God Writes Your Life Story (2004; with; Eric Ludy). Multnomah Publishers. ISBN 1590523393.
- Teaching True Love to a Sex-at-13 Generation (2005; with Eric Ludy). Thomas Nelson Publishers. ISBN 084994256X.
- A Perfect Wedding (2006; with Eric Ludy). Harvest House Publishers. ISBN 0736915664.
- The First 90 Days of Marriage (2006; with Eric Ludy). Thomas Nelson Publishers. ISBN 0849905249.
- Authentic Beauty, Going Deeper: A Study Guide for the Set-Apart Young Woman (2007) Multnomah Publishers. ISBN 1590529758.
- Meet Mr. Smith (2007; with Eric Ludy). Thomas Nelson Publishers. ISBN 0849905435.
- Set-Apart Femininity (2008) Harvest House Publishers. ISBN 0736922865
- Sacred Singleness (2009) Harvest House Publishers. ISBN 0736922881
- Answering the Guy Questions (2009) Harvest House Publishers. ISBN 0736922873
- Wrestling Prayer (2009; with Eric Ludy). Harvest House Publishers. ISBN 0736921656.
- The Lost Art of True Beauty (2010) Harvest House Publishers. ISBN 0736922903.
- Set-Apart Motherhood (2014)
- The Set-Apart Woman (2015)
