= Joshua Harris (author) =

American writer, former pastor

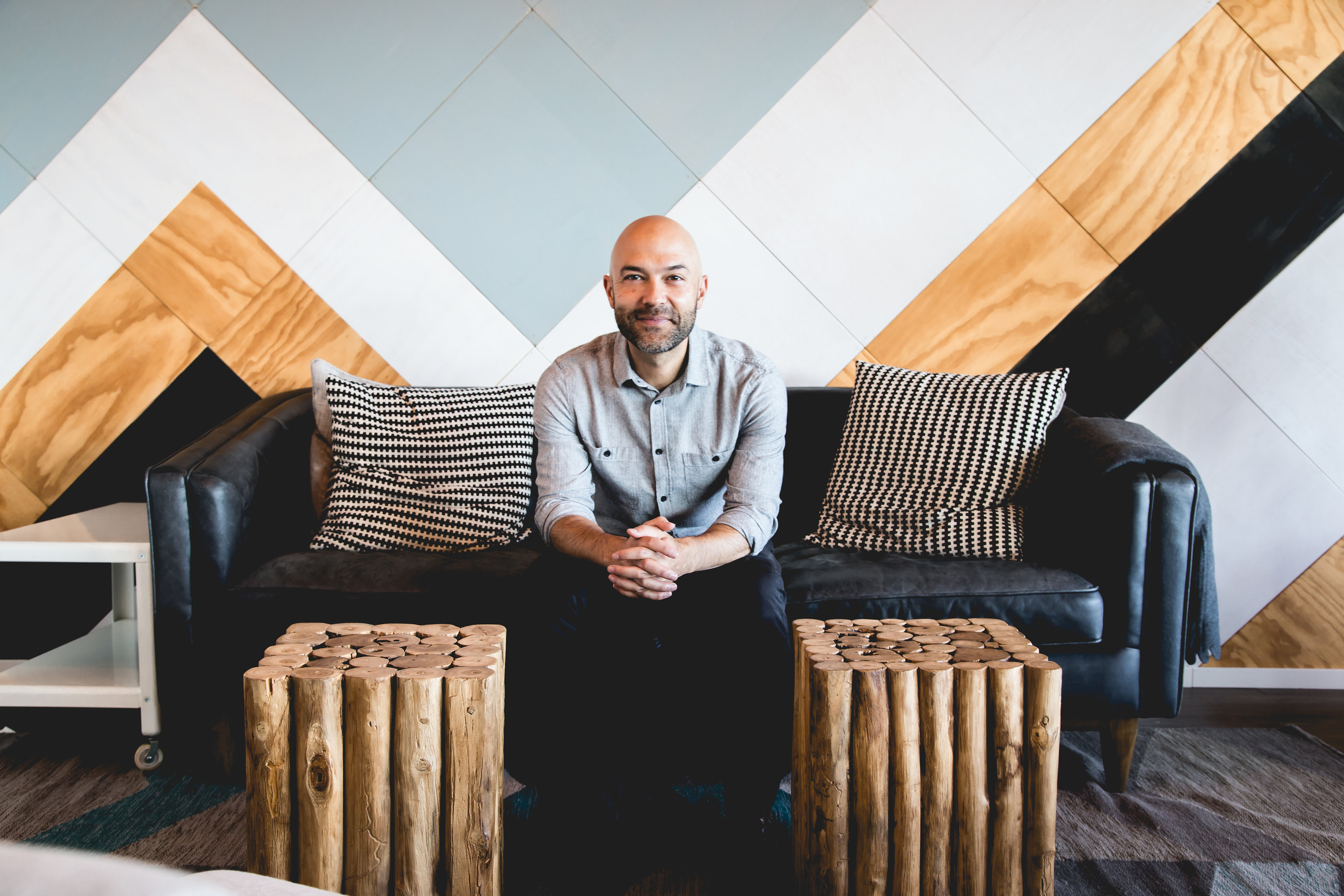
- Born: Joshua Eugene Harris; 1976 (age 49–50); Dayton, Ohio, U.S.
- Occupation: Author
- Children: 3
- Website: joshharris.com

Joshua Eugene Harris is an American former evangelical Christian pastor. Harris' 1997 book I Kissed Dating Goodbye, in which he laid out his ideas concerning a biblically based Christian approach to dating and relationships, helped shape purity culture for many Christian millennials. Harris was lead pastor of Covenant Life Church, the founding church of Sovereign Grace Ministries, in Gaithersburg, Maryland, from 2004 until 2015.

In 2018, Harris disavowed I Kissed Dating Goodbye and discontinued its publication. The following year, Harris announced that he was separating from his wife, had "undergone a massive shift in regard to my faith in Jesus" and was no longer a Christian. He now describes himself as a seeker: "I pray to Jesus and visit church, but I engage with religion very differently than I did in the past."

== Biography ==
Harris is the first of seven children born to Gregg and Sono Harris, pioneers in the Christian homeschooling movement. He is of Japanese descent on his mother's side. Harris published New Attitude, a magazine aimed at fellow homeschoolers, from 1994 to 1997. He received no formal seminary or theological training until 2015, when he attended Regent College, Vancouver, B.C. Harris married Shannon Hendrickson in 1998. They have had three children. His brothers, twins Alex and Brett, authored The Rebelution (rebelution is a neologism defined by its creators as "a teenage rebellion against low expectations").

Harris's first book, I Kissed Dating Goodbye, was published in 1997 and has sold 1.2 million copies worldwide. Subsequent books by Harris include Boy Meets Girl (2000), in part describing his engagement to his eventual wife, Shannon; Not Even a Hint: Guarding Your Heart Against Lust, released in 2003 and renamed Sex Is Not the Problem (Lust Is) in 2005; and Stop Dating the Church!: Fall in Love with the Family of God (2004). Harris' book Dug Down Deep (2010) shared his journey towards a love for theology and highlighted his passion for what he called "humble orthodoxy".

In 1997, Harris moved from Oregon to Gaithersburg, Maryland, to be a pastoral intern. There, "C.J. Mahaney, a charismatic Calvinist and founding pastor of megachurch Covenant Life Church, took Harris under his wing and groomed him to take over the church." Harris was lead pastor of Covenant Life Church from 2004 until 2015. Harris assumed the role of senior pastor at Covenant Life Church at the age of 30. In January 2015, he resigned from that role due to a desire to broaden his views and connect to other parts of Christianity. In an interview, Harris said the isolation of Covenant Life, and of a small cluster of churches of which it was a part, may have fed leadership mistakes, including the decision of pastors — himself among them — to handle a child sexual abuse case internally instead of going to police.

Harris started Sovereign Grace Ministries' New Attitude Conference for Christian singles in 1999, with inspiration and guidance from Louie Giglio, founder of Passion Conferences. From 1999 until 2011 he continued frequently to organize and lead this conference, although in 2008 it was renamed "Next."

In 2016, Harris stated that he was reconsidering the content of I Kissed Dating Goodbye and apologized to people who said that they had been hurt by its teachings. In 2018, Harris disavowed I Kissed Dating Goodbye and discontinued its publication. His publishers agreed that I Kissed Dating Goodbye and two other follow-up books would not be reprinted once the current stock was depleted. Harris appeared in a documentary film called I Survived I Kissed Dating Goodbye, where he spoke to people who were critical of the book.

In July 2019, Harris announced that he and his wife were separating due to "significant changes [that] have taken place in both of us". The couple divorced that year. Subsequently, Harris revealed that he no longer considered himself a Christian. His former wife also left Christianity and began pursuing a career as a singer-songwriter under the name Shannon Bonne.

In addition to his previously discontinued books, with Harris's announcement of his loss of faith, the documentary film lost its distributor due to the negative reaction from the Christian market.

== Books ==
- I Kissed Dating Goodbye (Updated Version). Multnomah, 2003. ISBN 1-59052-135-8
- Boy Meets Girl: Say Hello to Courtship. Multnomah, 2000. ISBN 1-57673-709-8
- Not Even a Hint. Multnomah, 2003. ISBN 1-59052-147-1 (re-published as Sex Isn't the Problem, Lust Is in 2005. ISBN 1-59052-519-1)
- Stop Dating the Church! Multnomah, 2004. ISBN 1-59052-365-2 (re-published as Why Church Matters: Discovering Your Place in the Family of God in 2011. ISBN 1-60142-384-5)
- Dug Down Deep Multnomah, 2010.
- Humble Orthodoxy: Holding the Truth High Without Putting People Down Multnomah, 2013. ISBN 1-60142-475-4)
