= I Kissed Dating Goodbye =

1997 book opposing contemporary dating

- Author: Joshua Harris
- Language: English
- Subjects: Christianity; relationships
- Publisher: Multnomah Books
- Publication date: January 1, 1997; April 2, 2003
- Publication place: United States
- Pages: 238
- ISBN: 978-1-59052-135-9

I Kissed Dating Goodbye is a 1997 book by Joshua Harris. The book focuses on Harris' disenchantment with the contemporary secular dating scene, and offers ideas for improvement, alternative dating/courting practices, and a view that singleness should neither need to be a burden nor should it be characterized by what Harris describes as "selfishness".

By the late 2010s, Harris reconsidered his view that dating should be avoided, apologizing to those whose lives were negatively impacted by the book and directing the book's publisher to discontinue its publication.

== Overview ==
In I Kissed Dating Goodbye, Harris popularized the concept of "courting" as an alternative to mainstream dating. In so doing, he raised discussion regarding the appropriateness of his proposed solutions, as well as the foundations on which he based his reasoning.

According to Harris, people in dating relationships put up a façade in an attempt to appear to be what the other person wants, thus hampering the "getting to know you" part of dating. Harris said that it is more appropriate and healthier in the long run to participate in "group dates" in order to truly understand the way a particular person interacts with others; in a group setting, a person is less likely to be able to maintain a façade. Harris proposed a system of courtship that involved the parents of both parties to a greater degree than is usual in conventional dating. In an interview with Family Christian Stores, Harris indicated that "people have taken the message of I Kissed Dating Goodbye and made it something legalistic – a set of rules. That's something that's beyond my control, and it's disappointing at times..."

On November 20, 2005, Harris gave a sermon entitled "Courtship, Schmourtship: What Really Matters in Relationships". In it, Harris encouraged single adults in his church to form friendships.

== Reception ==
The book has been cited as an example of belief in "benevolent sexism" and "women as property" as well as promoting "rape supportive messaging" and "sexual purity teachings" that emphasize a "hierarchical father-daughter relationship" and reduces the agency of adolescent girls.

Other commentators have pointed to IKDG as an example of messaging addressed to conservative Christians that would make them less likely to engage in online dating. Yet others have suggested that the book promoted "condemnation and shame" among young women in the True Love Waits movement. The book has been characterized as portraying ideal young Christian women as "sexually passive, emotional, and patient" and discouraging young Christian men from forming relationships with women.

Christian psychologists Henry Cloud and John Townsend suggest that avoiding dating in order to avoid suffering, as Harris advises, causes those who do so to forgo opportunities to mature, especially through learning how to create healthy boundaries.

== Retraction and apology by author ==
In 2016, Harris reconsidered the claims that he had made in the book and apologized to several who publicly communicated how the book had influenced them to stay single or had been used by adults to impose stringent rules on them.

During a 2017 TED talk, Harris said his greatest regret about the book was him transferring his fears into the book. He said: "Fear is never a good motive. Fear of messing up, fear of getting your heart broken, fear of hurting somebody else, fear of sex... There are clear things in statements in Scripture about our sexuality being expressed within the covenant of marriage. But that doesn't mean that dating is somehow wrong or a certain way of dating is the only way to do things. I think that's where people get into danger. We have God's word, but then it's so easy to add all this other stuff to protect people, to control people, to make sure that you don't get anywhere near that place where you could go off course. And I think that's where the problems arise."

In 2018, faith-based film company Exploration Films teamed with Harris to release a documentary entitled I Survived I Kissed Dating Goodbye. That same year, Harris stated that he reconsidered his view that dating should be avoided, apologizing to those whose lives were negatively impacted by the book and directing the book's publisher to discontinue its publication.

In July 2019, Harris announced on Instagram that he and his wife, Shannon, were separating due to "significant changes [that] have taken place in both of us". Later that month, Harris announced that he was no longer a Christian. In August, Exploration Films halted distribution of I Survived, citing a lack of transparency from Harris after working with him for months. The company returned the rights back to director Jessica van der Wyngaard.
