= Faith deconstruction =

Evangelical Christian movement

Faith deconstruction, also known as deconstructing faith, religious deconstruction, or simply deconstruction, is a process during which religious believers reexamine and question their beliefs. It originated in American evangelicalism, where it may be called evangelical deconstruction. The term rose in popularity in connection with the exvangelical movement, which began in 2016. It is sometimes called the deconstruction movement. Subsequently, the term religious deconstruction has been applied to other religions as well.

During deconstruction, people doubt their beliefs, identity, and practices. They may struggle and experience anxiety. Some eventually modify their beliefs into something more satisfactory to the believer. This results in a rejection of religion for some, and a revised or renewed faith for others.

The term takes its name from Jacques Derrida's philosophical concept of deconstruction, although it has only a loose relationship to that concept.

== Description ==
Deconstruction is a process of personal religious re-examination. People who deconstruct have described destabilizing feelings of anxiety, guilt, anger, confusion, and fear, as well as curiosity, awe, and liberation. As an open-ended process, the outcome of deconstruction is uncertain.

=== Definitions ===
The term can have a range of meanings. Alisa Childers defines deconstruction as "the process of systematically dissecting and often rejecting the beliefs you grew up with". Tyler Huckabee, writing for Relevant magazine, defines it as "a process of re-examining the faith you grew up with". John Stonestreet and Timothy Padgett note that it is used both descriptively (covering everything from the deconversion of Kevin Max, through the soul searching of Derek Webb, to the theological revisions of Jen Hatmaker and Rob Bell), or prescriptively ("recommended, especially to those questioning what they’ve grown up with, as a courageous thing to do").

Alan Jamieson, in his book A Churchless Faith, describes faith deconstruction as follows:

The deconstruction of their previously received faith leads people engaged in this process to successively examine the individual components of their faith. People engaged in the deconstruction of their faith remove each article of the belief and value system of their received faith and submit it to a process of ongoing reflection. This process involves a questioning and scrutinizing of the particular belief or value. The important aspect of this process is that each component of their faith is critiqued on the basis of whether the individual will appropriate it as part of their own personal belief or value system.

There is broad agreement that the term is derived from Jacques Derrida's philosophical concept of deconstruction. David Hayward, also known as "nakedpastor", says that he "co-opted the term" from Derrida, whose work he was reading at the time his beliefs started to erode.

=== Spread ===
Notable advocates of faith deconstruction include internet comedy duo Rhett McLaughlin and Link Neal (who published multiple podcast episodes detailing their spiritual deconstruction), John D. Caputo (who in 2007 wrote What Would Jesus Deconstruct?: The Good News of Postmodernism for the Church), and Richard Rohr. Prominent former Christians who underwent deconstruction include Joshua Harris (whose book I Kissed Dating Goodbye was foundational to purity culture and who briefly offered a course on deconstruction), Abraham Piper, and Marty Sampson.

As of February 2022, there were 293,026 posts on Instagram using the hashtag #deconstruction.

=== Outcomes ===
Psychologist Daryl R. Van Tongeren catalogs these possible outcomes following deconstruction:

- Religious reconstruction is retaining or rebuilding religious beliefs, often with a shift in religious identity. Some people who reconstruct report a feeling of spiritual growth and maturity.
- Religious deidentification is a reduction in religious identity or religious beliefs. Deidentification may be broken up into:
  - Disbelief in core tenets of religion, as for example an atheist or agnostic
  - Disengagement from emotional connection with the spiritual or divine
  - Discontinuance of religious rules, for example, reconsidering the requirement of sexual purity
  - Disaffiliation from religions social communities, for example, no longer attending worship services

== Responses ==
After preaching a sermon in which he equated deconstruction with leaving the faith, Matt Chandler clarified that it "doesn’t mean doubt or theological wrestle or struggling through church hurt". John Cooper has stated, "It is time that we declare war against this deconstruction Christian movement... There is nothing Christian about it. It is a false religion."

Carl Trueman argues that the "(mis)use of the Derridean d-word gives the whole a specious veneer of intellectualism and a certain superannuated postmodern chic".

== See also ==
- Apostasy – Formal disaffiliation of a religious belief
- Emerging church – Christian movement
