= Nakedpastor =

Brand name of author

NakedPastor is the brand name of author and cartoonist David Hayward. Hayward started a blog called nakedpastor in 2006 and initiated his public analysis of religion, religious communities, and spirituality through his writings, art, and cartoons. Hayward was one of the first people (possibly the first) to start using the word deconstruction in relation to faith. His work includes topics such as spiritual abuse, faith deconstruction, exvangelicals, Women’s rights, and LGBTQ+ rights.

NakedPastor has published 10 books, including his most recent book, Flip It Like This in July 2022. NakedPastor is followed by many communities, including those of deconstructing, those who have left the faith altogether, and LGBTQ+ Christians. In 2025, he released his first affirming children's book. Although Hayward is known for his cartoons, he also creates other pieces of art, including watercolors.

== Faith deconstruction ==
NakedPastor claims to be the first to use the word deconstruction in relation to leaving the faith in 2008. In an online interview he stated "I was studying Derrida at the time my belief system started to erode, and I co-opted the term because it sounded like a good way to describe the process I was going through. It's not the slight changing of beliefs but basically the demolition of one's belief system,” NakedPastor has written two books centered around deconstruction: The Lasting Supper: Letters for Deconstruction and Til Doubt Do Us Part: When Changing Beliefs Change Your Marriage. Deconstruction is a growing phenomenon which has been spoken about by well-known authors and speakers such as Tyler Huckabee, Joshua Harris (who briefly offered a course on deconstruction) and Marty Sampson.

=== Creating healthier spaces and spiritual freedom ===
Although many people think NakedPastor is a Christian encouraging people into the faith, he has openly stated that his goal is to make sure that every individual finds their own spiritual freedom in whatever that may seem fit.

== Bibliography ==
- Nakedpastor101: Cartoons by David Hayward (2011). CreateSpace Independent Publishing Platform; ISBN 9781453898413
- Without a Vision My People Prosper (2011). CreateSpace Independent Publishing Platform; ISBN 9781467920797
- The Liberation of Sophia (2014). CreateSpace Independent Publishing Platform; ISBN 9781497524668
- The Art of Coming Out: Cartoons for the LGBTQ Community (2014). CreateSpace Independent Publishing Platform; ISBN 9781500340988
- Questions Are the Answer: Nakedpastor and the Search for Understanding (2015). Darton, Longman & Todd, Limited; ISBN 9780232531886
- The Lasting Supper: Letters for Deconstruction (2016). CreateSpace Independent Publishing Platform; ISBN 9781535100526
- La Liberación de Sofía (2017). CreateSpace Independent Publishing Platform; ISBN 9781979504584
- Money Is Spiritual (2020). Independently Published; ISBN 9798636824886
- Til Doubt Do Us Part: When Changing Beliefs Change Your Marriage (2020). Amazon Digital Services LLC - KDP Print US; ISBN 9798663893749
- Flip It Like This! (2022). 1517 Media; ISBN 9781506484723
