= John Sailhamer =

American theologian (1946-2017)

John Herbert Sailhamer (October 17, 1946 – January 9, 2017) was an American professor of Old Testament studies at Golden Gate Baptist Theological Seminary in California. He was president of the Evangelical Theological Society in 2000 and made notable contributions to Old Testament studies.

== Career ==
After a B.A. at California State University, Long Beach, his Th.M. at Dallas Theological Seminary, and his M.A. and Ph.D. (1981) at University of California at Los Angeles, Sailhamer began his teaching career in 1975 at Biola University, then taught at Bethel Seminary, Trinity Evangelical Divinity School, Western Seminary (1995–98), Southeastern Baptist Theological Seminary (1999–2006), and at Golden Gate Baptist Theological Seminary beginning in 2006. He was briefly appointed as provost of Dallas Theological Seminary in 1993, but resigned before he was to begin serving in 1994.

Sailhamer served on the review and editorial teams for two recent Bible translations — the New Living Translation and the Holman Christian Standard Bible.

Sailhamer published extensively on Old Testament matters, especially the Pentateuch. Sailhamer's latest publication, The Meaning of the Pentateuch (2009), has been called his magnum opus and briefly broke into Amazon.com's top 100 sellers. John Piper has heartily endorsed it saying, "There is nothing like it. It will rock your world. You will never read the 'Pentateuch' the same again."

=== Historical Creationism ===
In Genesis Unbound: A Provocative New Look at the Creation Account (1996), Sailhamer argued for a view of creation that he labels as "Historical Creationism", which contends that the creation week in Genesis 1 is a record of the preparation of the Garden of Eden for Adam and Eve, not a record of the preparation of the whole planet Earth itself or the universe. This view, along with the book Genesis Unbound, has been endorsed by major evangelical pastors and theologians (particularly in the New Calvinist movement), such as Matt Chandler, Mark Driscoll, and John Piper.

== Publications ==
- Genesis: The Expositor's Bible Commentary (1990) with Walter C. Kaiser Jr., Richard Hess, Tremper Longman III and David E. Garland ISBN 978-0310230823
- NIV Compact Bible Commentary (1999) ISBN 978-0310228684
- An Introduction to Old Testament Theology: A Canonical Approach (1995) ISBN 978-0310232025
- The Pentateuch as Narrative: A Biblical-Theological Commentary (1995) ISBN 978-0310574217
- Biblical Prophecy (1998) ISBN 978-0310500513
- "Biblical Theology and the Composition of the Hebrew Bible", pp 25–37 in Biblical Theology: Retrospect and Prospect, edited by Scott J. Hafemann (2002) ISBN 978-0830826841
- "The Meaning of the Pentateuch: Revelation, Composition and Interpretation." (2009) ISBN 978-0830838677
