= Don't Waste Your Life (book) =

2003 book by John Piper

- Author: John Piper
- Language: English
- Genre: Self-help
- Publisher: Crossway Books
- Publication date: 2003
- Publication place: United States

Don't Waste Your Life is a best-selling book by pastor and theologian John Piper of Bethlehem Baptist Church in Minneapolis, Minnesota, United States. It was published in 2003 by Crossway Books, which re-published Group Study Editions in 2007 and 2009.

In 2007, the book sold over 500,000 copies, achieving the Gold Book Award recognized by the Evangelical Christian Publishers Association.

== Summary ==
The book consists of ten chapters and a preface, in which Piper encourages readers to make the most of their lives by following the teachings of the Bible. Through each chapter, he demonstrates ways in which readers can make their lives meaningful and interesting. Piper examines the question, “Why am I here?” He uses examples from his own life as well as from the lives of others. He discusses the difference between a life of risk and life lived without it.

== Reviews/reception ==
Don’t Waste Your Life has been favorably reviewed by Walt Mueller of CPYU.org, and by Tim Challies, of Discerningreader.com.

In 2009 a group of Christian rap musicians toured the United States, spreading the message from Piper's book.
