= Hell Is a World Without You =

2024 American novel

- Author: Jason Kirk
- Cover artist: Emily Mahon (print and ebook), Evangelyn Kirk (audiobook)
- Genre: Coming of age
- Published: 2024 (Shutdown Fullbooks)
- Publication place: United States
- Media type: Print, ebook, audiobook
- Pages: 314
- ISBN: 9-781-73549264-3

Hell Is a World Without You is a coming-of-age novel by journalist Jason Kirk. It tells the story of a group of teenagers born into Evangelicalism in the United States. Set in the early 2000s, the novel depicts religious deconstruction, 9/11-era conservative politics, purity culture, end-times paranoia, debates about afterlife theology, and humor about both Christian and secular pop culture.

Hell Is a World Without You was received with positive reviews by critics including Kirkus Reviews and Publishers Weekly, with Sojourners naming it one of the 20 "best faith and justice books of the century." It was a best-seller according to USA Today.

== Plot ==
In the year 2000, 14-year-old Isaac Siena, Jr., a lifelong born-again Christian, seeks friendships at a suburban Pennsylvanian church where his fire-and-brimstone older brother, Eli, works as a volunteer. Both are dealing with their father's death from a few years prior, and they believe he might be suffering in Hell.

Freshman Isaac befriends the pastor's devout son, Josiah, and homeschooled niece, Sophie. At public school, Isaac discovers one of his friends is an atheist and lesbian. By failing to change her religious status, Isaac believes he has contributed to her eventual damnation. His furious internal voice urges him to commit self-harm, but he stops after speaking with Sophie.

As a sophomore, Isaac establishes a found family of church misfits, many of whom begin questioning what they've been taught. After the attacks of September 11, the church's Pastor Jack pivots into Christian nationalist rhetoric. When Isaac supports Josiah, who has been outed as gay, Pastor Jack bans Isaac from the fellowship.

Isaac visits other churches, including an over-the-top megachurch and a remote monastery, again diverting from his religious background by dating a Catholic girl. Overcome by guilt after their first hookups, he drowns his shame in his first alcohol binge. His conservative mother, revealing her past as a rebellious teenager, encourages him to replicate his father's optimism instead.

During their senior year, Isaac and Sophie begin dating while also breaking from their inherited orthodoxy. They begin nudging their church peers toward universal reconciliation and anti-capitalist politics while right under the nose of Eli (now one of Pastor Jack's right-hand men). Believing the fates of souls to be on the line, Eli threatens Isaac's life, shooting him in the arm.

After suffering a faith crisis, Isaac reveals to Sophie his self-harm attempt from years prior. Moments before a seaside sunrise, he weeps, finally grieving his father.

The epilogue, set at some point after 2020, reveals the casually spiritual Isaac expecting his first child with Kori, a religion professor who identifies as demi-girl and was previously known as Sophie.

== Background ==
Jason Kirk began writing Hell Is a World Without You as a short story in late 2019. It was inspired by a conversation with his wife, Emily, on an experience he had as a young Southern Baptist.

It took him about four years to write, beginning in earnest during the COVID-19 pandemic. Kirk has described its influences as including Julien Baker, Saved!, Superbad, Siddhartha, Lady Bird, and Clueless, as well as some of the story's primary cultural references, which include Diablo II.

When asked about writing a novel instead of a memoir, the author described the freedom that comes with being able to "reorganize" life experiences "meaningfully" among differing characters at differing times, thus finding himself "spread throughout almost all" of the story's characters. On the book's depiction of its religious settings, he said, "All the right-wing stuff with which my characters interact (persecution-complex song lyrics, casual misogyny, presumed queerphobia, etc.) could've been drawn from my memories alone." While writing, Kirk determined "there's so little fiction that tells the story of someone who left this very specific kind of church — this turn-of-the-century Evangelical church."

In August 2024, Shutdown Fullbooks published an annotated-edition ebook that also included a spinoff novella.

=== Title explanation ===
Kirk has described the title as incorporating the common theological phrase "Hell is the absence of God," the name of the rock band mewithoutYou, the quote "Hell is only a word; the reality is much, much worse" from the horror film Event Horizon, and the quote "I'm glad to be with you, Samwise Gamgee, here at the end of all things" from The Lord of the Rings. Additionally, he has called it part of a theological statement based on scripture: "If Hell is a world without God, and if we are the breaths of the Spirit, then Hell is a world without us."

== Reception ==
Kirkus Reviews called Hell Is a World Without You "a consideration of evangelical Christianity that blends sublimely with a droll coming-of-age tale," awarding it the publication's "Get It" accolade and including the review in the publication's March 2024 print issue. Publishers Weekly praised the book as including "brutal honesty and extensive empathy" and compared it to Julia Scheeres' Jesus Land. In a "Starred" review, Independent Book Review called the novel "joyous and sobering" and predicted "readers will be swept away with its poignant and intellectual rigor."

Columbia Daily Tribune described it as "painfully, beautifully true" and said it "compassionately navigates a world of shaky absolutes." "The details that make it feel authentic to those of us who grew up in this milieu will be fascinating to those who didn’t," wrote Religion Dispatches.

Polygon included the audiobook edition, narrated by Kirk, on its list of "the best audiobooks to listen to right now."

The novel has appeared on USA Today's Best-selling Booklist and Bookshop's best-selling Fiction list. In February 2024, the author publicly pledged to donate $50,000 in royalties to the Trevor Project.
