= Christian hedonism =

Doctrine associated with John Piper and Vernard Eller

Christian hedonism is a Christian doctrine believed by some evangelicals. The term was coined by John Piper in his 1986 book Desiring God based on Vernard Eller's earlier use of the term hedonism to describe the same concept. Piper summarizes this philosophy of the Christian life as "God is most glorified in us when we are most satisfied in Him."

== Doctrine ==
The Westminster Shorter Catechism summarizes the "chief end of man" as "to glorify God, and to enjoy him forever." Piper has suggested that this would be more correct as "to glorify God by enjoying Him forever." Many Christian hedonists, such as Matt Chandler, point to figures such as Blaise Pascal and Jonathan Edwards as exemplars of Christian hedonism from the past, though their lives predate the term.

Christian hedonism was developed in opposition to the deontology of Immanuel Kant. Kant argued that actions should be considered praiseworthy only if they do not proceed from the actor's desires or expected benefit, but rather from a sense of duty. On the contrary, Christian hedonists advocate for a consequentialist ethic based on an understanding that their greatest possible happiness can be found in God. In this critique of Kant, John Piper was influenced by Ayn Rand.

== Criticism ==
Critics charge that hedonism of any sort puts something (namely, pleasure) before God, which allegedly breaks the first of the Ten Commandments: "You shall have no other gods before me." In response, Piper states on his website that

By Christian Hedonism, we do not mean that our happiness is the highest good. We mean that pursuing the highest good will always result in our greatest happiness in the end. We should pursue this happiness, and pursue it with all our might. The desire to be happy is a proper motive for every good deed, and if you abandon the pursuit of your own joy, you cannot love man or please God.

— John Piper (theologian), We Want You to Be a Christian Hedonist!

== See also ==
- Ethical egoism
- Moshe Chaim Luzzatto, a Jewish theologian with a similar view
