= Matt Chandler (pastor) =

American pastor and author

- Church: Village Church

Personal details
- Born: Seattle, Washington
- Denomination: Non-Denominational
- Spouse: Lauren
- Children: 3
- Occupation: Executive director of the board of the Acts 29 Network, Pastor, Author
- Website: www.pastormattchandler.com

Matt Chandler is an American evangelical Christian pastor. He is the senior pastor of Village Church, based in Flower Mound, Texas and the executive director of the board of the Acts 29 Network.

== Early life ==
Chandler was born in Seattle, Washington. His father was in the military, causing him to move multiple times. They lived in Olympia, Washington; Sault Ste. Marie, Michigan; Alameda, California, and Galveston, Texas. In Texas, the 6 ft 5 in (196 cm) Chandler was a member of the high school football team. He often refers to Jeff Faircloth, a football teammate, was quick to share the good news of Jesus with him in a way that intrigued Chandler. Over the course of two years, Chandler attended church gatherings, opposed the beliefs, raised questions, and doubts against Christianity before deciding to accept the teaching of Christianity.

== Education and career ==
Following high school, Chandler acquired his first job, as a janitor at Pine Drive Christian School in Dickinson, Texas. Chandler first spoke in front of a crowd when he was asked to share his testimony at a high school chapel. He was then offered a job as a youth minister at a small Baptist church in La Marque, Texas, at the age of 18. Chandler moved to Abilene, Texas, where he attended Hardin-Simmons University. While there, Chandler began leading the weekly Grace Bible Study at the Paramount Theater. Chandler earned a Bible degree from Hardin-Simmons University. In 1996, Chandler was hired by Beltway Park Baptist Church under pastor David McQueen. In 1999, Chandler started a non-profit called Waiting Room Ministries with close friend Shane Barnard. Chandler twice started seminary classes but dropped out both times because he felt that he had acquired the tools he was learning from seminary back in bible school. He married his wife, Lauren, on July 31, 1999, and they have three children.

=== The Village Church and Acts 29 Network ===
A woman on the board of his non-profit organization asked Chandler to put in a résumé at Highland Village First Baptist Church. Chandler claims he did not expect to get the job due to conflicts in beliefs. Despite this, he was offered the job, and in 2002 he accepted the position. The church at that point had an attendance of 160 people. Now known as The Village Church, it has since become a multi-site megachurch with over 14,000 attendees. Chandler says his character was partially shaped by John Piper.

In March 2012, Chandler was named president of Acts 29 Network, succeeding Mark Driscoll who had helped found the network of church planters but was later removed for a pattern of "ungodly and disqualifying behavior". Acts 29 Network is a partnership of church plants that has grown to over 400 churches in the United States and around the world.

Chandler is an elder and the lead pastor of teaching at The Village Church, which is located in the Dallas-Fort Worth metroplex and consists of a single campus called Flower Mound. The Village Church considers itself to be "gospel-centered." Their mission statement reads, "At The Village Church, the means by which we will pursue the glory of God in the making of disciples is four-fold: gospel-centered worship, gospel-centered community, gospel-centered service and gospel-centered multiplication. The church has an average growth rate of over one thousand people per year. Chandler believes the growth after his arrival helped him to make many changes, including switching to all male eldership.

== Theological views ==
=== Israel and the Church ===
Chandler distinguishes between Israel and the church as two different bodies God created at different points in history. Chandler sees the church as being created by God through Christ's preaching: "God created the Church through the proclaimed gospel of the revealed Word, Jesus Christ."

=== Christian hedonism ===
Chandler believes in Christian hedonism, a phrase coined by John Piper, which teaches that "God is most glorified in us when we are most satisfied in Him" and that God's highest pursuit ("His glory") and man's deepest and most durable joy come together in one pursuit—namely, the pursuit of satisfaction in God.

=== Historic Creationism ===
Regarding creationism, Chandler refers to himself as a "historic creationist", taking the view presented by Old Testament professor John Sailhamer in his book Genesis Unbound. Chandler describes the view, in his words, that God created the universe "in the early stages of an unknowable period of time" and that the days of creation were when "God groom[ed] a section of land that was uninhabitable… and prepare[ed] it for Adam and Eve and plac[ed] them in the garden and g[ave] them the cultural mandate, 'Go and make the rest of the world look like this. You're going to need a lot of help. Have a lot of babies.'" He affirms that the creation of the universe took place before the biblical Creation Week.

=== Complementarianism ===
Chandler holds to a complementarian view of gender roles. This view states that man and woman are equal in essence, value, and dignity but were created and called by God for distinct roles within the home and church. Husbands are charged to lead, protect, and provide for their wives and families, and wives to affirm and submit to their husbands' leadership. Men are also to bear the primary responsibility of leading the local church; therefore, the office of pastor/elder is restricted to men. Chandler believes that men were designed to be "cultivators, growers, nurturers, and builders".

=== Calvinism ===
Chandler's soteriology is Calvinistic. This view states that a person's “response to the gospel is rooted and grounded in the free and unconditional election of God for His own pleasure and glory.”

=== Continuationism ===
Regarding spiritual gifts, Chandler is a continuationist. He believes that supernatural gifts such as prophecy, miracles, healings, and speaking in tongues have not ceased and should be exercised within the church under the authoritative parameters that Scripture provides.

== Works ==
=== Books ===
Title	Year	Contributor(s)	ISBN	Publisher
Becoming Like Jesus	2026		9781400344307	Thomas Nelson
Awake and Alive	2025		9781400249428	Thomas Nelson
The Overcomers	2024		9781400344284	Thomas Nelson
Family Discipleship	2020	Adam Griffin	9781433566325	Crossway
Joy in the Sorrow	2019	"And friends"	9781784984540	Good Book Company
An Even Better Christmas	2018		9781784983512	Good Book Company
Take Heart	2018	David Roark	9781784983178	Good Book Company
The Mingling of Souls	2015	Jared C Wilson	9780781412827	David C Cook
Recovering Redemption	2014	Michael Snetzer	9781430031987	LifeWay Christian Resources
To Live Is Christ to Die Is Gain	2013	Jared C Wilson	9780781410885	David C Cook
Creature of the Word	2012	Eric Geiger, Josh Patterson	9781433678639	B&H Publishing Group
The Explicit Gospel	2012	Jared C Wilson	9781433530036	Crossway

=== Bible Studies ===
- The Overcomers Bible Study Guide (2024)
- Recovering Redemption - Bible Study Book (2022)
- James - Bible Study Book (2022)
- The Apostles' Creed - Bible Study Book (2017)
- A Beautiful Design - Bible Study Book (2016)

== Controversies ==
=== Handling of child molestation allegation ===
In June 2019, The New York Times reported that in 2015, Village Church and Chandler had placed Karen Hinkley under church discipline when she began annulment proceedings for her marriage to a man who admitted having an addiction to child pornography. After initially being unable to have a face to face discussion with Chandler, she later discussed the incident with Chandler, with Chandler apologizing and Hinkley accepting the apology. The allegation was included in a report where Christi Bragg, a member of the church, "said that Mr. Chandler and church leaders failed to provide her family with sufficient answers and support after her family told them that her daughter had been molested." Bragg's daughter sued the church, alleging gross negligence and seeking damages. During a sermon, Chandler disagreed that the church had mishandled the case and stated that he had met with the family, which the family said was not true. The church settled the case in 2022.

=== Leave of absence ===
In August 2022, Chandler took a leave of absence from the Village Church after reportedly exchanging multiple Instagram direct messages with a woman who was not his wife. The church hired boutique law firm Castañeda + Heidelman LLP to conduct an investigation, with the church declining to share the report, stating they wanted "to honor the request of the woman Matt was messaging with not to be in the spotlight". Chandler called the exchange "unguarded and unwise", with church elders describing the leave of absence was "both disciplinary and developmental." Chandler stated that the messages "were not sexual or romantic".

On December 4 of the same year, Chandler returned to preaching at the church. Chandler became the executive chairman of the board during his leave of absence, with the presidency being taken over by the previous executive director, Brian Howard.

== Personal life ==
Chandler married his wife Lauren in 1999. They have three children.

In November 2009, Chandler had a seizure at his home and was later diagnosed with anaplastic oligodendroglioma, a malignant brain tumor. Chandler commented in June 2010 that he believed that God healed his cancer. He received treatment at Baylor University Medical Center and was given a clean bill of health in September 2010.
