= Abraham Piper =

American entrepreneur and TikToker

TikTok information
- Page: Abraham Piper
- Followers: 1.7M (Apr 26, 2023)

Abraham Piper is a serial entrepreneur and artist living in Minneapolis. He is the son of Reformed Baptist preacher and writer John Piper.

== Early life ==
At age 19, he was excommunicated from his father's church after he rejected the faith. He was restored to membership four years later, but later rejected the faith again.

== Career ==
He started the popular news aggregator 22 Words in 2008. He founded the media company Brainjolt in 2014, which owns 22 Words and several other internet companies. In 2017, he told CNBC Brainjolt was expected to have $30 million in annual revenue. In 2019, he started a premium jigsaw puzzle company called Blue Kazoo.

== Online presence ==
In November 2020, he began posting TikTok videos, which included posts critical of his Evangelical upbringing. His TikTok following on his @abrahampiper account was 1.7 million followers and 37 million cumulative likes. His secondary account, @moreabrahampiper, had approximately 446 thousand followers in February 2024, with a total of 4.3 million cumulative likes on his videos.

== Personal life ==
Piper has three brothers: Barnabas, a pastor in Nashville, Tennessee; Benjamin, who works in construction; and Karsten, an English instructor at Minnesota West Community & Technical College. He is also brother to his adoptive younger sister Talitha Piper.
