= Sarah McCammon =

American journalist

- Education: Trinity College (BA); University of Oxford
- Occupation: Journalist
- Spouse: Greg Weinman
- Children: 2

Sarah Fowler McCammon is an American journalist and a National Correspondent for National Public Radio, covering the Mid-Atlantic and Southeastern regions of the United States. Her reporting focuses on political, social and cultural divides in America, including abortion and reproductive rights, the intersections of politics and religion, as well as breaking news. She previously reported for NPR Member stations in Georgia, Iowa and Nebraska.

== Early life and education ==
McCammon was raised in Kansas City, Missouri, in a conservative evangelical Christian home. Her father worked on the air at Kansas City's public radio station, KCUR, throughout his four years of college. She attended Blue Ridge Christian School, a private K-12 religious school in Kansas City. In 1998, while in high school, she spent a semester serving as a Page in the United States Senate.

In 2003, McCammon graduated from Trinity College in Deerfield, Illinois, with a Bachelor of Arts in English and Communication and a minor in History. She spent one semester at Oxford University, where she mostly studied general European history, Shakespeare, early Christianity, and old Anglo-Saxon poetry.

== Career ==
McCammon began her journalism career as a newspaper reporter at the Daily Herald, where she worked from 2003 to 2004.

In 2004, McCammon transitioned to radio when she joined Nebraska Public Media, where she worked as a reporter and producer. In January 2010, she began working for Iowa Public Radio where she hosted the statewide broadcast of NPR's Morning Edition and contributed to NPR's coverage of the 2012 Iowa Caucuses and general election. McCammon then served as Savannah Bureau Chief of Georgia Public Broadcasting from 2013 to 2015.

In 2015, McCammon joined the staff of National Public Radio, where she is a National Desk Correspondent. During the 2016 election cycle, she was NPR's lead political reporter covering the 2016 Trump Presidential Campaign. She is also a frequent guest host for NPR news magazines, podcasts and special coverage.

=== Awards ===
In 2015, McCammon was awarded the Atlanta Press Club's "Excellence in Broadcast Radio Reporting". McCammon was part of a team of NPR journalists that received a first-place National Press Club award in 2019 for their coverage of the Pittsburgh synagogue attack.

“With Abortion Restrictions On The Rise, Some Women Induce Their Own”, a story McCammon produced in 2020, led to a Gracie Award for News Feature.

== Personal life ==
McCammon is married to Washington DC attorney, Greg Weinman, and has two sons from a previous marriage.

She was raised an Evangelical Christian but left, becoming an exvangelical. She has said that her grandfather, a military veteran and a neurosurgeon who was gay, was a large influence on her.

== Works ==
- McCammon, Sarah (March 19, 2024). The Exvangelicals. New York: St. Martin's Press. ISBN 978-1-250-28447-1. OCLC 1375540986.
