= Beltway Park Church =

Beltway Park
- Beltway Park Church
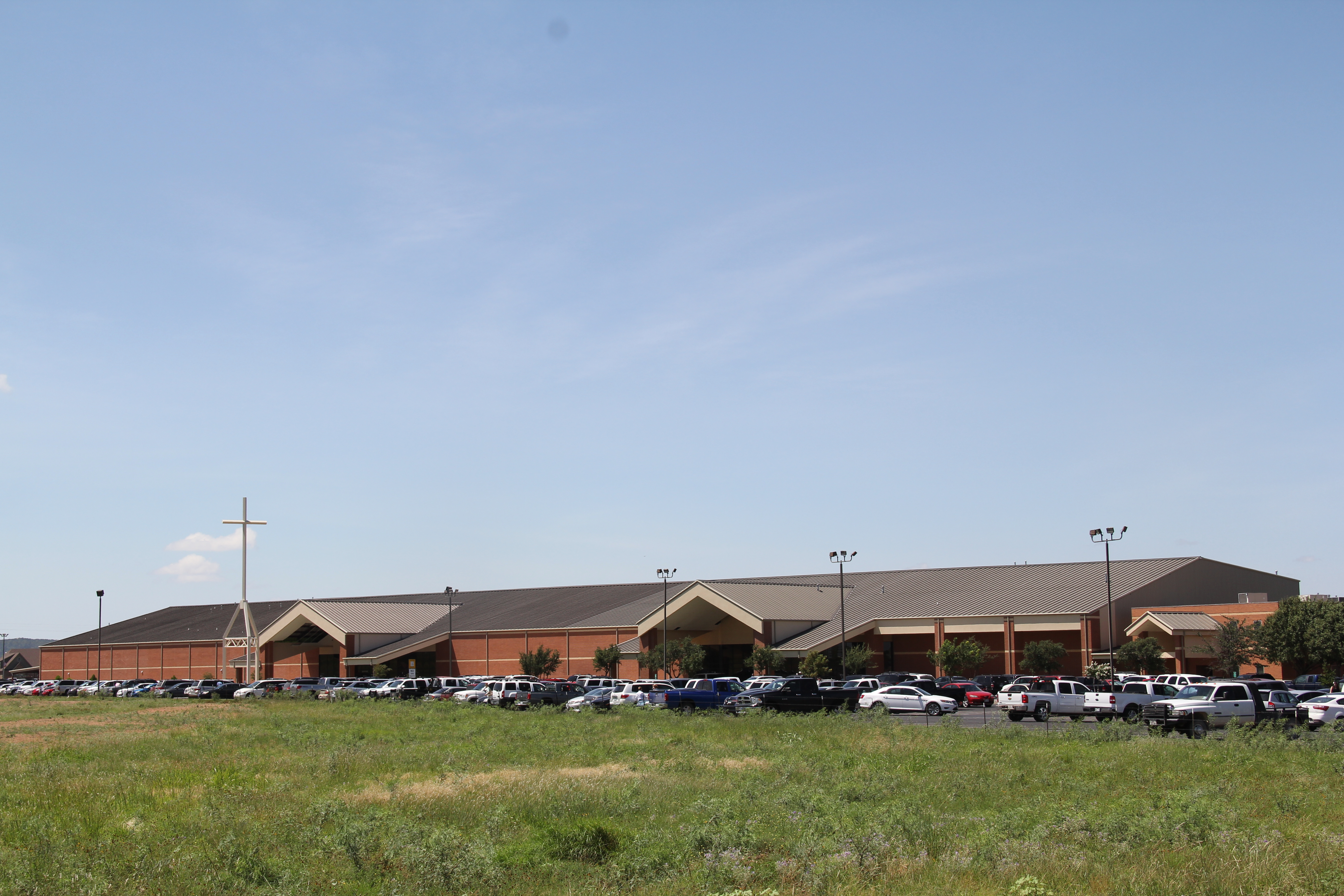
- Beltway Park Church (South Campus) in 2013
- Beltway Park
- 32.3498°N 99.7759°W
- Location: Abilene, Texas
- Country: United States
- Denomination: Baptist
- Website: beltway.org

History
- Former name: Beltway Park Baptist Church (1985-2015)
- Founded: August 11, 1985

Clergy
- Priest: Zacchaeus Wayneous New (North)

Beltway Park Church is a Baptist Evangelical multi-site megachurch based in Abilene, Texas. It is affiliated with the Southern Baptist Convention. In 2016, Beltway Park averaged approximately 4,836 people in attendance each week. The head pastor is Geoffrey Turner.

== History ==
The church was founded in 1985 by Pastor Glen Schmucker. Matt Chandler was on staff at Beltway Park from 1996 to 1999 and indicates this time as important in restoring his value for the local church. In 1998, David McQueen became senior pastor. In 2025, Geoffrey Turner became Lead Pastor, as McQueen stepped into a new role as Legacy Pastor.

In late 2013, Beltway Park announced plans to construct a new satellite campus on the north side of Abilene. Construction began by December 2013 and was completed in the spring on 2015. In 2014, Beltway college ministry released the album Heaven Came Down. The church was renamed Beltway Park Church in 2015. According to a church census released in 2016, it claimed a weekly attendance of 4,836 people and 2 campuses.

In October 2024, a youth ministry volunteer at the church, Charles Goff, was charged with felony possession of child sexual abuse imagery after soliciting nude imagery of girls aged 14 and 15 online.

== Beliefs ==
The Church has a Baptist confession of faith and is a member of the Southern Baptist Convention, despite claims of being a Non-Denominational church and attempts to promote multi-denominational unity.

=== Charismatic ===
Beltway Park has adopted a charismatic Christian theology under McQueen's leadership. The church believes that all the gifts of the Holy Spirit, such as speaking in tongues and Faith healing are active in the church today.

=== Israel ===
Beltway Park also teaches Christian Zionism, the belief in the importance of the evangelism of Israel in the church today in accordance with teachings of Don Finto. Its members partake in multiple traditionally Jewish events, such as a Passover meal on a Sunday in April.
