= Bethlehem Baptist Church (Minneapolis) =

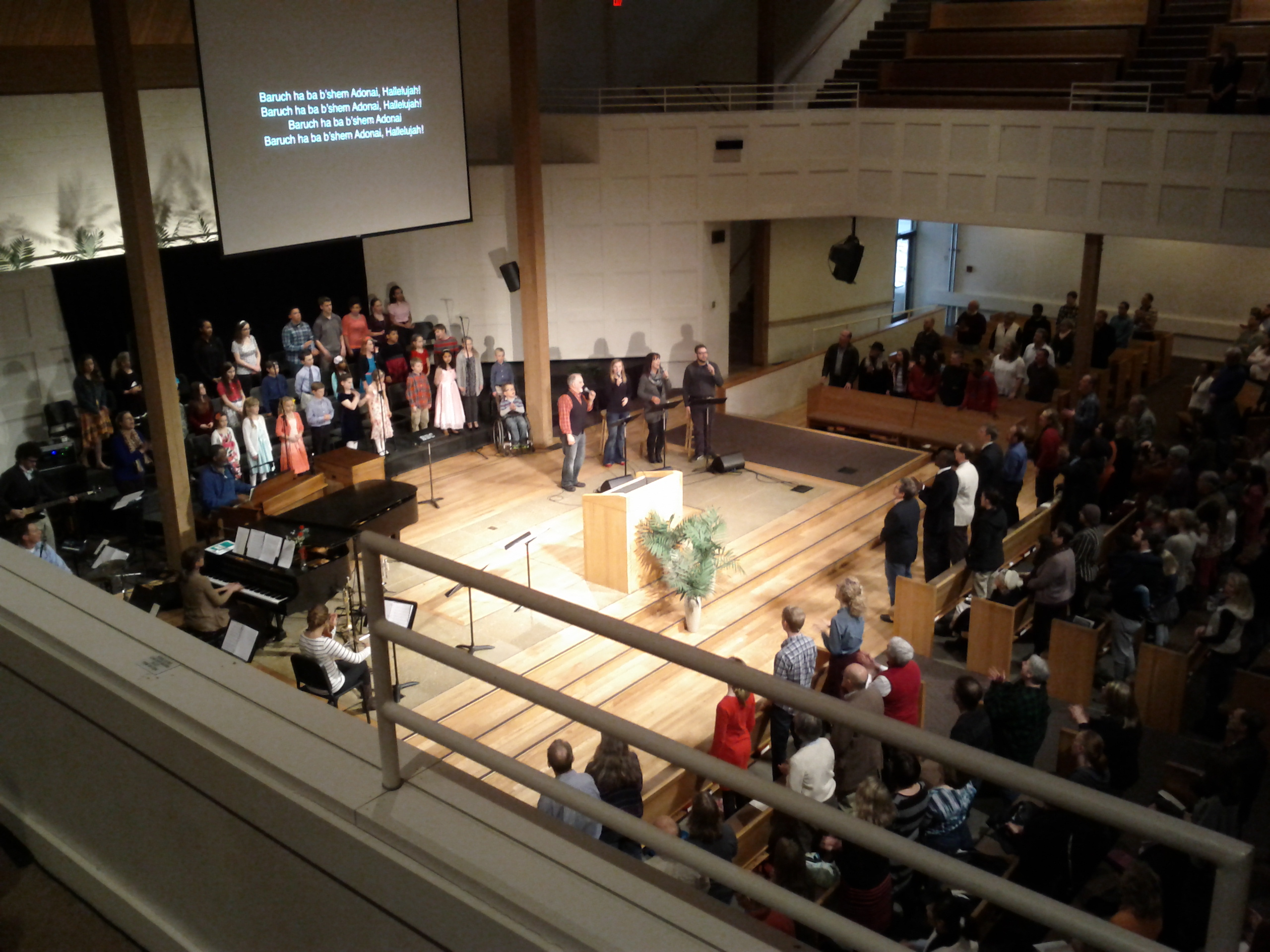
- Worship service in 2013
- Bethlehem Baptist Church
- 44°58′9″N 93°15′18″W
- Location: Minneapolis, Minnesota
- Country: United States
- Denomination: Baptist
- Website: bethlehem.church

History
- Former name(s): First Swedish Baptist Church of Minneapolis
- Founded: 1871
- Founder: J. L. Johnson

Specifications
- Capacity: 900

Clergy
- Pastor(s): Kenny Stokes, Pastor for Preaching & Vision

Bethlehem Baptist Church is a Baptist Evangelical church based in Minneapolis, Minnesota. It is affiliated with Converge North Central and Converge.

== History ==
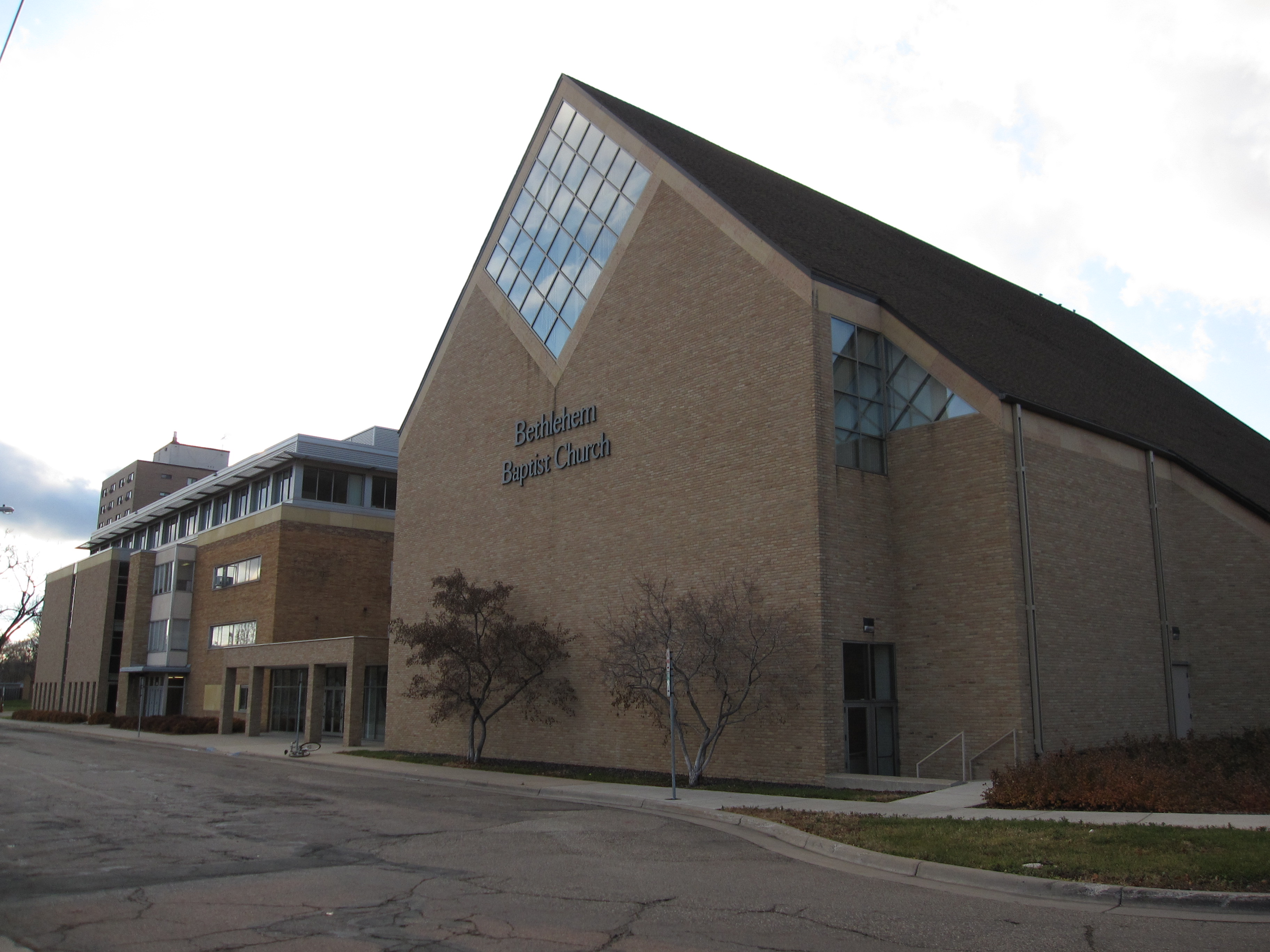
Campus in Minneapolis

In the early 1870s, J. L. Johnson became the first Swede baptized by immersion in Minneapolis—in 30-below weather. He and a growing number of Swedes joined First Baptist Church (Minneapolis), and eventually formed a Swedish Bible class.

On June 22, 1871, they branched off, with First Baptist's blessing, and founded Bethlehem—originally as the First Swedish Baptist Church of Minneapolis. This was seven years after the American Civil War ended, and 13 years after Minnesota became a State, in a hall at 2nd Street and Nicollet Avenue in Minneapolis, with 23 charter members. Pastor John Ring laid the foundation for the church, which was the first Swedish Baptist church in the Twin Cities area. In March 1872, the church bought a lot at 6th Street and 12th Avenue for $1,000 ($26,875 today); they broke ground in March of the following year on a new $4,000 wood-frame church building.

The church had four pastors in its first ten years. The fifth pastor, Dr. Frank Peterson, arrived in June 1881 to a church of 127 members. On March 16, 1885, during Peterson's pastorate, the church burned and was irreparable. The congregation learned that the Second Congregational Church at 8th Street and 13th Avenue South—only three blocks from the burned site—was available for $13,500 ($483,750 today). The church bought the building and property in May 1885. Peterson was of the view that Scandinavian immigrants made the best Baptists, because, as he put it in 1886, they were Protestants, religious, were not communists or socialists, and very few of them were "peddlars, organ grinders, or beggars." There were 445 members by January 1, 1891, when Peterson departed.

Under Peterson's ministry, 12 young people became missionaries. One was Ola Hanson who became a missionary to the Kachin people of Burma for 40 years. Hanson put the Kachin language into writing, produced an 11,000-word Kachin-English dictionary, trained 40 local pastors, and translated the Bible into Kachin. The British government awarded him the Kaisar-i-Hind Medal. His story is told in a biography titled Light in the Jungle, by Gustaf Sword.

The church's first services in English started in 1893, on a bi-weekly basis. The 6th pastor, Olof Bodien, came in 1893 and pastored until 1912. During that time the church suffered a fire (December 3, 1893) and a tornado (August 1904). By this time a number of notable Swedish Baptists were members of the church. The church had two pastors from 1912 to 1918, when the eighth pastor, Eric Carlson, arrived. Membership rose to 834, and language tension grew during that time between old (Swedish) and young (English). The ninth pastor, Anton Sjolund, came in 1928, and membership reached 1,204. Services in Swedish continued until the mid-1930, but on January 1, 1936, the church voted to move all services to English, except for one Swedish Sunday School class. Nine years later, on April 13, 1945, First Swedish Baptist voted to change its name to Bethlehem Baptist Church (the same year that the Swedish Baptist General Conference in America dropped Swedish from its name).

The tenth pastor, Eric Lindholm, came in 1949. He oversaw the building of the $500,000 ($5,731,635 today) Sunday School Building, dedicated at year's end 1957 and still in use. The eleventh pastor, John Wilcox, came in 1959 as the church's first non-Swedish pastor (he was originally a Southern Baptist), and pastored Bethlehem for seven years. The twelfth pastor was Robert Featherstone, and the thirteenth, Bruce Fleming, pastored through the 1970s. By 1980, Bethlehem was a somewhat typical downtown Minneapolis church. Most congregants lived in suburbs and commuted, including the pastor. The average age of the now 300-person congregation was 75 years old when the pulpit became open. John Piper became the new senior pastor. He had been teaching Bible at the denominational college, Bethel College. In 1983, Pastor Steller had a missionary epiphany, recognizing how the church's theology connected to world missions reaching unreached people, and a missions movement was born. The average age soon dropped from the 70s and 60s to the 20s.

In 1991, the church enlarged its space. Bethlehem enlarged her worship space; the building purchased in 1885 was demolished to increase educational space. One of the stained glass windows from the original building is on display in the foyer. Another building addition came in 2003. In 2002, the church expanded its downtown ministry into the northern Minneapolis by creating a second campus. Instead of building a larger worship center downtown, nearly half the congregation began worshiping in Maranatha Hall at Northwestern College in Roseville. In June 2005, the church moved into its current North Campus facility in Mounds View. In September 2006, Bethlehem launched its third campus at Burnsville High School. In 2012, Jason Meyer became the senior pastor. In September 2018, the church moved into its current South Campus facility in Lakeville. On July 26, 2020, the congregation voted to approve three pastors for preaching and vision, one for each campus. In 2020, the church would have 4,600 people.

In 2021, Kenny Stokes became Pastor for Preaching and Vision.

In 2022, it ended its multisite network and its North and South campuses became stand-alone churches.

By 2025, it had 2 Sunday services in its 900-seat sanctuary.

== Controversies ==
Jason Meyer resigned as Pastor for Preaching and Vision, Downtown Campus, effective August 1, 2021. According to the latter, the council of elders accused him of having too much empathy in his sermons. Meyer suggested that a neo-fundamentalist preacher would better meet the council's expectations. The church had three pastors resign during the summer of 2021, citing issues including bullying, a toxic culture, and conflicts over how to handle abuse. Much of the abuse these pastors faced had to do with their support for the critical race theory and the #Metoo movement.

== Beliefs ==
The church has a Baptist confession of faith and is a member of Converge.
