= Exvangelical =

People who have left evangelicalism

Exvangelical or Ex-Evangelical are terms used to describe persons who have left evangelical Christianity, especially those who belonged to evangelical churches in the United States.

A significant number of former evangelicals (Baptists, Methodists, Pentecostals and Nondenominationals) have joined liturgical Christian denominations, such as Roman Catholicism, Evangelical-Lutheranism, and Orthodox Christianity. Others have pursued liberal Christian denominations, such as the United Church of Christ, or have become nonreligious.

Reasons for leaving evangelicalism vary greatly; for many, it may include a growing penchant for Church history and tradition. For others, the reason may be related to social issues, with some evangelicals citing becoming disillusioned by the movement's embrace of Donald Trump, though others have aligned themselves with the evangelical left or wider Christian left, or have joined historic peace churches such as those of Anabaptist Christianity.

== History ==
The hashtag #exvangelical was coined by Blake Chastain in 2016 to make "a safe space for people to find solidarity with others who have gone through similar experiences". While Twitter was originally the site with the most activity involving the hashtag #exvangelical, the term also soon gained widespread exposure on Instagram and, and in the 2020s, The TikTok. People in the movement may also be called "exvies". The term prodigals is sometimes used for exvangelicals by people who remain evangelical.

While a number of exvangelicals have found a home in liturgical Christian denominations, such as Roman Catholicism, Evangelical-Lutheranism or Orthodox Christianity, other exvangelicals would be considered part of the larger movement away from churches and the decline of religious participation in the United States that has been documented by The Pew Research Center and PRRI.

Others have pursued liberal Christian denominations, such as the United Church of Christ. Some former evangelicals have aligned themselves with the wider Christian left, or have joined historic peace churches such as those of Anabaptist Christianity.

Certain ex-evangelicals see themselves as post-evangelical and question evangelicalism's official social and moral agenda, such as its rejection of LGBTQ and abortion rights, from within evangelical communities themselves. The movement was catalyzed by evangelicals' enthusiastic embrace of Donald Trump, and his perceived lack of "values fit" with Evangelicals' nominal beliefs. With respect to those who have become nonreligious, podcasts spread the movement and provide space for evangelicals to work through the process of de-conversion. Popular exvangelical podcasts include Almost Heretical, Straight White American Jesus, and Chastain's podcast Exvangelical. Non-fiction books related to the movement include Pure by Linda Kay Klein, Searching for Sunday by Rachel Held Evans, The Exvangelicals by Sarah McCammon, A Well-Trained Wife by Tia Levings, Exvangelical and Beyond by Blake Chastain, and Star-Spangled Jesus by April Ajoy. Exvangelical novels include Hell Is a World Without You by Jason Kirk.

== Motivations ==
A number of evangelicals have moved to liturgical Christian denominations, such as Catholic Church, Evangelical-Lutheranism, and Orthodoxy. Reasons for this migration include studying church history (such as reading the Ante-Nicene Fathers) and learning about church tradition.

Some exvangelicals choose to leave their religion following what they see as disagreements over the role and treatment of women, LGBT rights, sexual abuse scandals, and Christian nationalism. Specific incidents cited by exvangelicals for leaving include the Nashville Statement and evangelical support for Trump, which they perceived as hypocritical.

Some Exvangelicals may cite bad experiences with purity culture as a major factor in leaving their church; this is particularly true among women. Exvangelical women often reject being held responsible for men's thoughts, and resent the disproportionately harsh punishments women face for sexual sins. Both men and women report difficulty living up to their church's expectations, and surprise at the hypocrisy of church officials who do not live up to (or do not appear to believe in) their own sexual standards. For example, exvangelical author Linda Kay Klein writes that treating all girls as potential "stumbling blocks" for evangelical men results a cycle of fear and shame, which she and other girls experienced in secret. Klein began to question purity culture when a youth pastor in her church was convicted of sexual enticement of a twelve-year-old girl. Joshua Harris wrote I Kissed Dating Goodbye in 1997, a book foundational to purity culture, which encouraged young people to avoid dating and instead practice courtship and abstinence. Harris repudiated his work in 2018, apologizing for its content and withdrawing it from publication. The following year, Harris announced that he was no longer a Christian, describing his experience as a "deconstruction" of his faith and apologizing for his previous teachings against LGBTQ+ people.

Exvangelical journalist Becca Andrews writes that, because Evangelical purity culture taught her the role of sexual gatekeeper, she was at first unable to identify a sexual assault forced upon her during her involvement with Christian organization Cru. Christa Brown was sexually abused by a Southern Baptist pastor as a teenager and has spoken out against the lack of accountability for church leadership.

== Related movements ==
The #churchtoo movement seeks to draw attention to sexual abuse in churches. Vocal critics of sexual abuse are Emily Joy and Hannah Paasch.

== Reception ==
In Christianity Today's podcast The Rise and Fall of Mars Hill, Baylor University professor Matthew Lee Anderson said the experiences of exvangelicals were "something very different than deep, difficult, self-examination in order to find the truth" and any bad experiences that drove people to leave were "sociologically, actually quite marginal experiences inside of white evangelicalism".

When a Gallup poll showed that fewer than half of Americans belonged to any church in March 2021, some commentators acknowledged criticisms raised by the exvangelical perspective. Russell Moore, director of the Public Theology Project at Christianity Today, speculated that if he were a teenager today, he may also have left the church. He found that "they have come to think the church doesn’t believe its own moral teachings" and so "the presenting issue in this secularization is not scientism and hedonism but disillusionment and cynicism".

On the other hand, Jordan L. Steffaniak, founder of London Lyceum, noted that he did not become an exvangelical after being "guided into the intellectual bulwark of the church", particularly the "vast, deep, and rich intellectual tradition of Christianity".

Exvangelics themselves frequently report that they miss their community, to some degree, upon leaving it. They miss their congregation's support during life events such as childbirth, and opportunities for creative expression such as church music and performance arts. On the other hand, exvangelicals typically feel relief at escaping their community's judgement. One exvangelical reported "I don't miss feeling that I have to live my life in a certain way because somebody else might tattle on me to someone."

== Outside the United States ==
Although it started in the United States, the exvangelical movement has also been noted in Brazil during the presidency of Jair Bolsonaro.

== See also ==
- Backsliding – Abandonment of the practice of Christianity through sin
- Progressive Christianity – Postmodern theological approach
- Lapsed Catholic – Catholic person who is non-practicing
- Ex-Mormon – Disaffiliate of The Church of Jesus Christ of Latter-day Saints
- Ex-Muslims – People who have left Islam
- Post-evangelicalism – Religious movement within Christianity
