= John Piper (theologian) =

American pastor and writer (born 1946)

The Reverend Dr John Piper
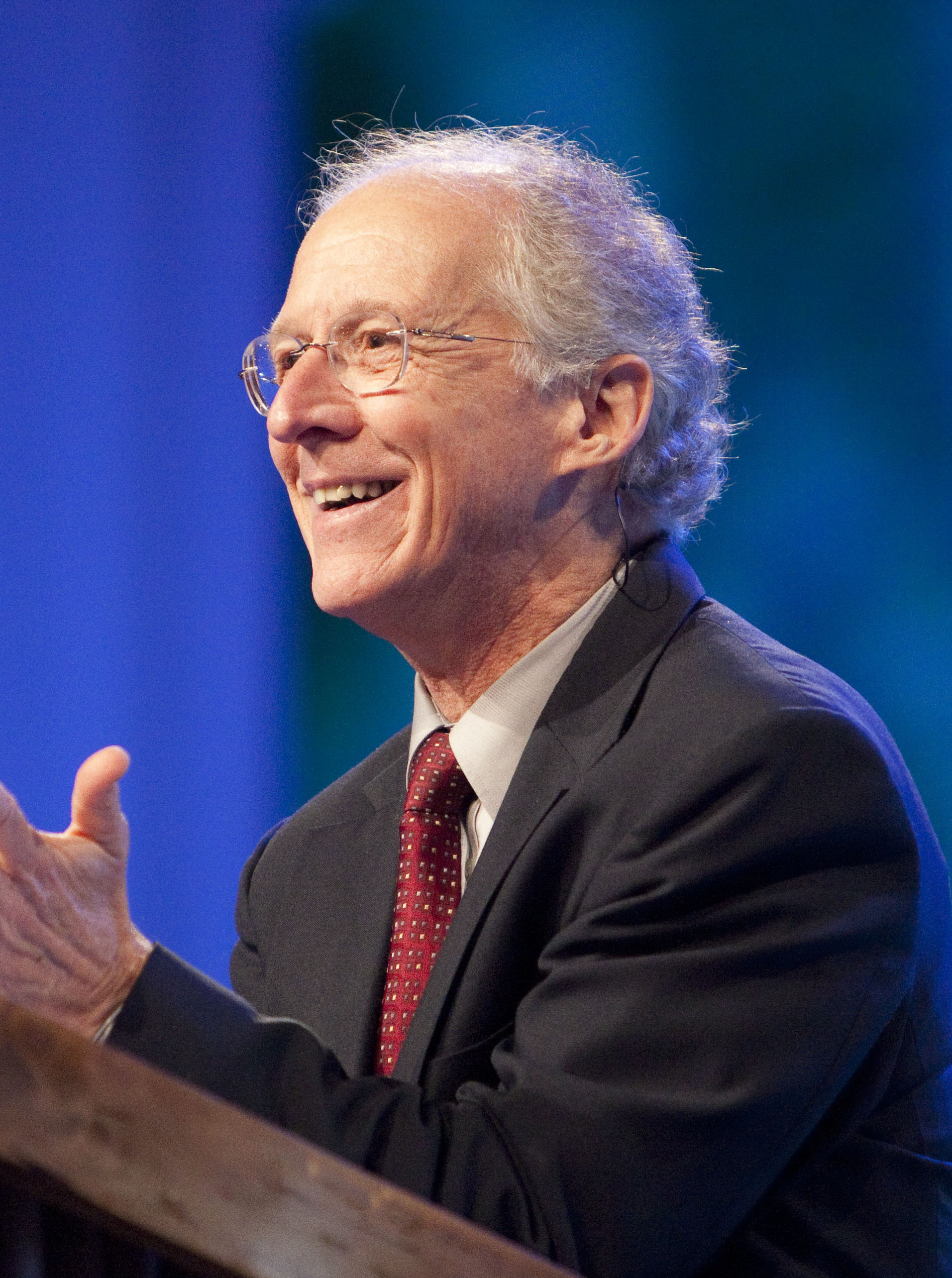
- Piper in 2010
- Born: John Stephen Piper; January 11, 1946 (age 80); Chattanooga, Tennessee, U.S.
- Occupations: Theologian; Professor; Author
- Spouse: Noël Piper (m. 1968)
- Children: Karsten; Benjamin; Abraham; Barnabas; Talitha
- Parents: Bill Piper; Ruth Piper

Academic background
- Education: Wheaton College, B.A.; Fuller Theological Seminary, B.D.; LMU Munich, Dr. theol.
- Alma mater: LMU Munich
- Thesis: "Love your enemies." Jesus' love command in the synoptics and in the early Christian paraenesis. A history of the tradition and interpretation of its uses. (1974)
- Doctoral advisor: Leonhard Goppelt

Academic work
- Era: Late 20th and early 21st centuries
- School or tradition: Evangelicalism; Baptist (Converge); New Calvinism
- Notable works: Love Your Enemies (1974); The Justification of God (1983); Desiring God (1986); The Pleasures of God (1991); Recovering Biblical Manhood and Womanhood (1991); Don't Waste Your Life (2003); Providence (2021)
- Notable ideas: Christian hedonism

Religious life
- Religion: Christianity
- Denomination: Baptist
- Church: Bethlehem Baptist Church (Minneapolis)
- Profession: Pastor

John Stephen Piper (born January 11, 1946) is an American Reformed Baptist theologian and retired pastor. Specializing in New Testament studies, he is chancellor of Bethlehem College and Seminary in Minneapolis, Minnesota. Piper taught biblical studies at Bethel University for six years (1974–1980), before serving as pastor for preaching and vision of Bethlehem Baptist Church (Converge) in Minneapolis for 33 years (1980–2013).

Piper is the founder and senior teacher of Desiring God (desiringgod.org), named for his book Desiring God: Meditations of a Christian Hedonist (1986), and has written a number of award-winning books, including ECPA Christian Book Award winners Spectacular Sins, What Jesus Demands from the World, Pierced by the Word, and God's Passion for His Glory, as well as bestsellers Don't Waste Your Life and The Passion of Jesus Christ.

Piper has been extensively active online, particularly with his podcast Ask Pastor John in which he answers submitted questions. It has over 2,000 episodes.

== Biography ==
Piper was born on January 11, 1946, in Chattanooga, Tennessee, to Bill and Ruth Piper. His father was a traveling evangelist for over 60 years. Before Piper was one year old, his family moved to Greenville, South Carolina, where he spent the remainder of his youth, graduating from Wade Hampton High School in 1964.

John Piper, 1964

According to Piper, he had a religious conversion at his mother's knee on a family vacation in Florida when he was six years old. Piper has remarked that the fact he was converted at the age of six "blows him away", not because he remembers the event, but due to his belief in the Bible's telling of the hopeless condition of all humans who have not been converted.

Piper married Noël Henry in December 1968, and together, they have four sons and a daughter. He studied at Wheaton College between 1964 and 1968, majoring in literature and minoring in philosophy. Studying romantic literature with Clyde Kilby led him to be interested in poetry, Piper has published several books of poetry, and continues to pursue, with his poetry, the deeper reality of personal, theological and social reality. He has explained in both prose and poetry why he writes. C. S. Lewis has remained a profound influence in Piper's life, in large measure, Piper says, because of the "combination of rational precision with language, and profound poetic perception of reality."

In the fall of 1966, Piper caught mononucleosis, and during this infection, he listened to the Pastor Harold John Ockenga on WETN, his college's radio station. Piper dated his call to the ministry of God's word to that experience: “I can remember listening there on my bed to his messages on the radio and feeling inside my heart simply explode with longing to be able to handle the word of God the way he was handling it in the pulpit at Edman Chapel. Before those three weeks were over, I had resolved to drop organic chemistry… That was, I believe, my call to the ministry of the word.”

Piper spent three years being taught by Daniel Fuller at Fuller Theological Seminary in Pasadena, California, from 1968 to 1971, and says that Daniel Fuller's influence on him was enormous. Three things are traceable to that influence: attention to exegetical detail in Bible study (indeed in all reading), a central conviction of the all-embracing sovereignty of God, and what Piper came to call Christian Hedonism.

Piper received his Doctor of Theology degree in New Testament studies at LMU Munich, Germany (1971–1974) under Leonhard Goppelt. His dissertation, Love Your Enemies, was published by Cambridge University Press and Baker Book House. Upon completion of his doctorate, Piper taught biblical studies at Bethel University in Saint Paul, Minnesota, for six years between 1974 and 1980.

Piper's mother died on December 16, 1974, in a bus wreck in Israel. Following this incident, a tribute to her was included in Piper's 1990 booklet What's the Difference?.

=== Ministry ===
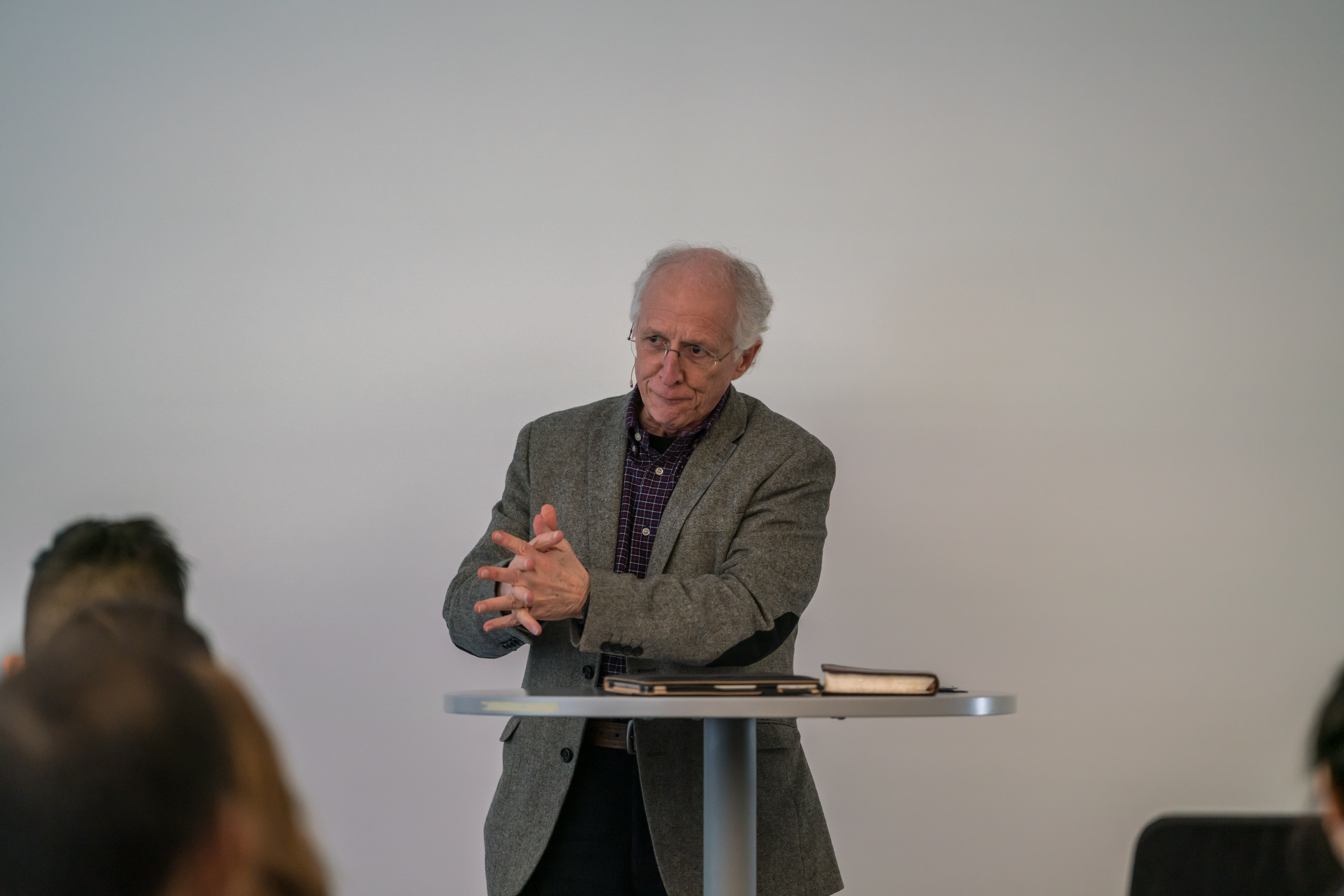
John Piper teaching at VMware, Palo Alto, California in February 2020.

In 1980, Piper became pastor of Bethlehem Baptist Church in Minneapolis, Minnesota, where he ministered until March 31, 2013, as pastor for preaching and vision. Piper became increasingly well known in evangelical Christianity after the publication of his book Desiring God: Meditations of a Christian Hedonist in 1986 and has continued to publish dozens of books further articulating his theological perspective. In 1994, Piper founded Desiring God Ministries, with the aim of "spread[ing] a passion for the supremacy of God in all things for the joy of all peoples through Jesus Christ." Desiring God Ministries offers all of Piper's sermons and articles from the past three decades—and most of his books—online at no cost.

Piper took an eight-month leave of absence from his ministry from May 1, 2010, to January 9, 2011. He announced in June 2011 that he would soon step down from his role of pastor. A candidate to succeed him was announced in March 2012, and on May 20, 2012, Jason Meyer was voted in (784 yes to 8 no) to be the next pastor for preaching and vision, replacing Piper.

On March 31, 2013 (Easter Sunday), Piper preached his final sermon as pastor of Bethlehem Baptist and announced in an open letter to the congregation that he and his family would be moving to Tennessee for at least a year for the church's new leadership to develop a strategic vision for the church without distractions. He still attends the church and is designated pastor emeritus with no official role in the church leadership.

Following his retirement from the active pastorship of his church, Piper has occupied himself with online work through his Desiring God ministries. He has a podcast, Ask Pastor John, in which he answers Bible- and life-related questions submitted by listeners. He has a video series called "Look at the Book" in which he annotates some portion of Scripture and goes through in-depth exegesis. In 2024, a condensed book version of the Ask Pastor John podcast (adapted by its host, Tony Reinke) was released.

== Recognition ==
In 2010, a Festschrift was published in his honor, entitled For the Fame of God's Name: Essays in Honor of John Piper, including contributions from Don Carson, Sinclair Ferguson, G. K. Beale, Thomas R. Schreiner, Wayne Grudem, Al Mohler, C. J. Mahaney, Mark Dever, John MacArthur, and Bill Mounce.

In 2018, he was named one of the 12 Most Effective Preachers in English by Baylor University.

== Personal life ==
He married Noël Henry in 1968 and has five children, including an adopted daughter. His son Abraham Piper has publicly criticized evangelical Christianity.

On January 11, 2006, Piper announced that he had been diagnosed with prostate cancer. According to a letter sent to his church, he and his doctors believed that the cancer was fully treatable. Piper responded to his diagnosis with the following:

This news has, of course, been good for me. The most dangerous thing in the world is the sin of self-reliance and the stupor of worldliness. The news of cancer has a wonderfully blasting effect on both. I thank God for that. The times with Christ in these days have been unusually sweet.

Piper underwent successful surgery on February 14, 2006.

== Works ==
- Love Your Enemies: Jesus' Love Command in the Synoptic Gospels and the Early Christian Paraenesis (Cambridge University Press, 1980; Baker, 1991).
- The Justification of God: An Exegetical and Theological Study of Romans 9:1–23 (Baker, 1983; 2nd ed, 1993).
- Desiring God: Meditations of a Christian Hedonist (Multnomah, 1986; 2nd ed, 1996; 3rd ed, 2003; 4th ed [25th Anniversary], 2011).
- The Supremacy of God in Preaching (Baker, 1990, 2nd ed, 2003).
- The Pleasures of God (Multnomah, 1991; Expanded edition, 2000).
- Recovering Biblical Manhood and Womanhood (Co-editor) (Crossway, 1991).
- Let the Nations Be Glad! The Supremacy of God in Missions (Baker, 1993, 2nd Edition 2003).
- Future Grace: The Purifying Power of Living By Faith In Future Grace (Multnomah, 1995).
- A Hunger for God: Desiring God Through Fasting and Prayer (Crossway, 1997).
- A Godward Life: Savoring the Supremacy of God in All of Life (Multnomah, 1997).
- God's Passion for His Glory: Living the Vision of Jonathan Edwards (Crossway, 1998).
- The Innkeeper (Crossway, 1998).
- A Godward Life, Book Two: Savoring the Supremacy of God in All of Life (Multnomah, 1999).
- The Legacy of Sovereign Joy: God's Triumphant Grace in the Lives of Augustine, Luther, and Calvin (Crossway, 2000).
- The Hidden Smile of God: The Fruit of Affliction in the Lives of John Bunyan, William Cowper, and David Brainerd (Crossway, 2001).
- Seeing and Savoring Jesus Christ (Crossway, 2001, 2nd edition, 2004).
- The Dangerous Duty of Delight: Daring to Make God the Object of Your Desire (Multnomah, 2001).
- What's the Difference?: Manhood and Womanhood Defined According to the Bible (Crossway, 2001, reprint 2008).
- The Misery of Job and the Mercy of God (Crossway, 2002).
- Brothers, We Are not Professionals: A Plea to Pastors for Radical Ministry (Broadman & Holman Publishers, 2002).
- The Roots of Endurance: Invincible Perseverance in the Lives of John Newton, Charles Simeon, and William Wilberforce (Crossway, 2002).
- Counted Righteous in Christ: Should We Abandon the Imputation of Christ's Righteousness? (Crossway, 2002).
- Beyond the Bounds (co-editor) (Crossway, 2003).
- Don't Waste Your Life (Crossway, 2003).
- Pierced By the Word: Thirty-One Meditations for Your Soul (Multnomah, 2003).
- The Prodigal's Sister (Crossway, 2003).
- The Passion of Jesus Christ (Crossway, 2004). Also released under title 50 Reasons Why Jesus Came to Die
- When I Don't Desire God: How to Fight for Joy (Crossway, 2004).
- Life As a Vapor (Multnomah, 2004).
- A God Entranced Vision of All Things (Co-editor; Crossway, 2004).
- Sex and the Supremacy of Christ (w/ Justin Taylor, Crossway, 2005).
- Taste and See: Savoring the Supremacy of God in All of Life (Multnomah, 2005).
- God is the Gospel: Meditations on God's Love as the Gift of Himself (Crossway, 2005).
- Contending for Our All: Defending Truth and Treasuring Christ in the Lives of Athanasius, John Owen, and J. Gresham Machen (Crossway, 2006).
- Fifty Reasons Why Jesus Came to Die (Crossway, 2006).
- Suffering and the Sovereignty of God (Crossway, 2006).
- What Jesus Demands from the World (Crossway, 2006).
- When the Darkness Will Not Lift: Doing What We Can While We Wait for God—and Joy (Crossway, 2007)
- Amazing Grace in the Life of William Wilberforce (Crossway, 2007).
- The Supremacy of Christ in a Postmodern World (co-editor w/ Justin Taylor, Crossway, 2007)
- Battling Unbelief: Defeating Sin with Superior Pleasure (Multnomah, 2007)
- The Future of Justification: A Response to N. T. Wright (Crossway 2007).
- Spectacular Sins: And Their Global Purpose in the Glory of Christ (Crossway, 2008).
- John Calvin and His Passion for the Majesty of God (Crossway, 2008).
- The Hidden Smile of God: The Fruit of Affliction in the Lives of John Bunyan, William Cowper, and David Brainerd (Crossway, 2008).
- Finally Alive - Christian Focus, (March 20, 2009).
- This Momentary Marriage: A Parable of Permanence (Crossway, 2009)
- Filling Up the Afflictions of Christ: The Cost of Bringing the Gospel to the Nations in the Lives of William Tyndale, Adoniram Judson, and John Paton (Crossway, 2009).
- A Sweet and Bitter Providence: Sex, Race, and the Sovereignty of God (Crossway 2010).
- Jesus: The Only Way to God: Must You Hear the Gospel to be Saved? (Baker, 2010).
- The Gadarene (Desiring God, 2010)
- Think: The Life of the Mind and the Love of God Crossway, (March 31, 2011).
- The Pastor as Scholar and the Scholar as Pastor - Crossway, (March 31, 2011).
- A Holy Ambition: To Preach Where Christ Has Not Been Named - Desiring God, (July 1, 2011)
- Thinking. Loving. Doing.: A Call to Glorify God with Heart and Mind (co-editor w/ David Mathis; Crossway, (September 8, 2011)
- Bloodlines: Race, Cross, and the Christian - Crossway, (September 8, 2011).
- The Innkeeper - Crossway; Reprint edition (September 14, 2011)
- Adoniram Judson - (Desiring God, 2012).
- Risk Is Right: Better to Lose Your Life Than to Waste It - Crossway (2013)
- The Dawning of Indestructible Joy: Daily Readings for Advent - Crossway (August 31, 2014)
- A Godward Life: Seeing the Supremacy of God in All of Life - Multnomah; Revised edition (October 6, 2015)
- Think It Not Strange: Navigating Trials in the New America (co-editor w/ 9 authors; Desiring God, 1 edition * (January 1, 2016)
- Lessons from a Hospital Bed - Crossway, (February 12, 2016)
- Your Sorrow Will Turn to Joy: Morning & Evening Meditations for Holy Week – CreateSpace Independent Publishing Platform; 1 edition (March 1, 2016)
- Living in the Light: Money, Sex and Power – The Good Book Company, (March 15, 2016)
- A Peculiar Glory: How the Christian Scriptures Reveal Their Complete Truthfulness – Crossway, (March 31, 2016)
- A Camaraderie of Confidence: The Fruit of Unfailing Faith in the Lives of Charles Spurgeon, George Müller, and Hudson Taylor – Crossway (April 30, 2016)
- 50 Crucial Questions: An Overview of Central Concerns about Manhood and Womanhood (co-editor w/ Wayne Grudem, Crossway (April 30, 2016)
- Andrew Fuller: Holy Faith, Worthy Gospel, World Mission – Crossway; (August 31, 2016).
- Happily Ever After: Finding Grace in the Messes of Marriage – Desiring God; 1 edition * (January 25, 2017).
- The Collected Works of John Piper (13 volume set plus Index) – Hardcover: 8464 pages * Publisher: Crossway (March 31, 2017).
- Reading the Bible Supernaturally: Seeing and Savoring the Glory of God in Scripture – Crossway, (April, 2017).
- The Satisfied Soul: Showing the Supremacy of God in All of Life – Multnomah, (September 5, 2017).
- Shaped by God: Thinking and Feeling in Tune with the Psalms – Desiring God, (November 17, 2017).
- Expository Exultation: Christian Preaching as Worship – Crossway, (April, 2018).
- Coronavirus and Christ – Crossway, (April, 2020).
- Providence – Crossway, (January, 2021).
- Come, Lord Jesus: Meditations on the Second Coming of Christ - (Crossway, 2023).
- All That Jesus Commanded: The Christian Life according to the Gospels - (Crossway, 2023).
