= Ministries Without Borders =

Ministries Without Borders (MWB) is an Evangelical neocharismatic Apostolic network of nearly 50 Christian churches, that forms part of the British New Church Movement. It is led by Keri Jones. Keri is the brother of the late Bryn Jones.

== History ==
Keri Jones originally worked with his brother in Covenant Ministries, which after Bryn's death devolved into five major components, of which MWB is one of them. The analysis of Andrew Walker, a commentator on neo-Pentecostalism in Britain stated the two brothers led the more conservative and radical group of the restorationist movement of the 1970s and 1980s, which Walker called R1. This was to distinguish it from another similar group located in the South (led by, for example Gerald Coates) which had taken a different stance on a number of key issues. MWB draws much from the Covenant Ministries' legacy, and Arthur Wallis' leadership.

== Today ==
The official description of MWB is: "Ministries Without Borders ... speaks of a people who are inwardly free and outwardly mobile to use their gifts, talents and abilities, to take the message of Hope, the Gospel of Good News, to a needy and dying world. Such people, from every age group, are aware that every mandate given by God can be achieved, and that there are no problems too difficult for His power of miracle." In 2007, MWB planted churches in the UK cities of Salford, Preston and Oldham; there are 18 other churches in the UK, mainly in North West England, the Midlands and Wales. There is one church in Indiana, US; fifteen in Norway; five in South Africa, and two each in the Philippines and India. There were other churches affiliated in Grand Rapids Michigan and Ontario Canada, but are now under the apostolic leadership of Steve Wilkins as part of Kindred House . July of 2006, Keri Jones launched "Mission 193," where members of the movement visited every nation of the world to pray and give copies of the Bible to representatives of said country. There is a yearly Bible conference for its UK-based churches which has been in Stafford from 2004 onwards. They are similar in style to the Downs Bible Weeks run in the 1980s and use ministry from international speakers.

== See also ==
- British New Church Movement
- Charismatic movement
- Spiritual gift
