= CML =

CML may refer to:

== Computing ==
- Chemical Markup Language, a representation of chemistry using XML
- Column Managed Lengths, a representation of data in columns
- Concurrent Mapping and Localization, a technique for building and utilizing maps by autonomous robots
- Concurrent ML, a high-level language for concurrent programming
- Configuration Menu Language, a language and system for compiling the Linux kernel
- Conversation Markup Language, a language for building chatbots
- Coupled Map Lattices, an extended method of cellular automaton

== Electronics ==
- Current mode logic, a differential digital logic family
- Commercial microwave link, a communication channel between neighbouring towers in mobile networks

== Organizations ==
- Centre for Missional Leadership, the Watford campus of the London School of Theology
- Classical Marimba League, an organization promoting the marimba, a percussion instrument
- CML - Institute of Environmental Sciences, an institute at Leiden University - the Netherlands
- Colorado Municipal League, see NLC members
- Columbus Metropolitan Library, one of the most used library systems in the United States
- Corpul Muncitoresc Legionar, a Romanian fascist workers' association
- Council of Mortgage Lenders, a trade association for the British mortgage lending industry

== Science and medicine ==
- Chronic myelogenous leukemia, a blood cancer
- N(6)-Carboxymethyllysine, an advanced glycation end-product

== Other uses ==
- Camarillo (Amtrak station) (station code CML), a train station in California, United States
- Chiltern Main Line
- Capital market line, the result when the market portfolio is combined with the risk-free asset
- Certified Master Locksmith, as awarded by the Associated Locksmiths of America
- 950 in Roman numerals
- Camooweal Airport, IATA airport code "CML"
- Comilla railway station (station code CML), a railway station in Bangladesh

== See also ==
- A common mistyping of XML in computing
