= Marimba (disambiguation) =

A marimba is a xylophone-like percussion instrument played with mallets.

Marimba may also refer to:

== Instruments ==
- Glass marimba, a type of idiophone also known as a vitrephone or crystallophone
- Marimba (lamellophone), a plucked box instrument also known as the marímbula
- Marimba Lumina, a MIDI controller that lets a musician play music via a control surface based on the layout of a marimba
- Marimbaphone, a tuned percussion instrument similar to the marimba, which can also be played with a bow
- Marimba-xylophone, another name for xylorimba, a pitched percussion instrument corresponding to a xylophone with an extended range

== People ==
Individuals

- Marimba Ani, anthropologist and African Studies scholar
- Marimba Roney (born 1976), Swedish journalist and television host

Groups

- Baja Marimba Band, American band of the 1960s and early 1970s
- Classical Marimba League, international organization dedicated to the advancement of the marimba
- Cuban Marimba Band, Tanzanian big band active from 1948 into the 1960s
- Reg Kehoe and his Marimba Queens, American musical group active from the late 1930s to the mid-1950s

Other

- Queen Marimba, African folk hero

== Science ==
- Leucanopsis marimba, a moth of the family Erebidae found in Venezuela
- Marginella marimba, a species of sea snail found off Angola

== Other uses ==
- Marimba, Angola, a municipality in Malanje Province
- Marimba, Inc., a former provider of configuration management software, bought by BMC Software in 2004

== See also ==
- Marimbault, a commune in France
- Mbira, a family of musical instruments, traditional to the Shona people of Zimbabwe
