= Bind Us Together =

Bind us Together
- Author: John Fleming
- Language: English
- Subject: Christian movements
- Genre: non-fiction
- Publisher: Thankful Books
- Publication date: December 2007
- Publication place: United Kingdom
- Media type: Paperback
- Pages: 345 pp (Paperback edition)
- ISBN: 978-1-905084-15-9

Bind us Together is a book by John Fleming which was published in December 2007 by Thankful Books.

== Overview ==
Bind us Together describes the restoration movement (also referred to as the British New Church Movement) that occurred in the church during the second half of the 20th century. This set out to re-evaluate the nature of the church that Jesus originally intended to establish. Hence the subtitle of the book is 'to be the church that Jesus really wants'. The movement's attempt to revitalise church life has made a significant positive impact on the church scene in the UK. It emphasised the importance of every believer's contribution to the church, the sharing of life through home groups, and lively worship. These features have now become a common part of many churches across all the Christian denominations. The movement also looked at the way church should be structured, and this led to the development of apostolic teams and families of churches such as Newfrontiers.

The book is in three parts. The first describes the history of the restoration movement from the perspective of someone who was intimately involved with the development of a large restoration church in Southampton. The second part takes a fresh look at what can be gleaned from the Bible on the nature of church life. Finally the book addresses the question of the next key challenges for the church. It makes the hypothesis that unity between Christians should be a principal focus for the way ahead. It proposes that in each locality there should be just one Christian church comprising all believers in that area working together in harmony.

The book presents a challenge to church leaders to re-consider their priorities in moving forward and a message to all Christians that Jesus really cares about how they relate together in church.

== Author and publication ==
Alongside his church role, Fleming is a professor of nuclear medicine physics at the University of Southampton. His book is published by Thankful Books who charge authors for "the design and production of the finished books" so at least one review describes it as self-published.
