= Original Christianity =

Original Christianity may refer to:

- the historical Origins of Christianity in the 1st century BC to the 1st century AD
- the claims of "original Christianity" restored in Restorationism (Christian primitivism)
