= Ichthus Christian Fellowship =

Fellowship of churches based in the UK

Ichthus Christian Fellowship is a neocharismatic Christian church movement and apostolic network based in London, United Kingdom. It is part of the British New Church Movement (BNCM) and has links with other BNCM leaders and movements, especially Gerald Coates of Pioneer Network.

== History ==
Ichthus Christian Fellowship was founded in London in 1974 by Roger T. Forster. By 1982 the Forest Hill congregation had grown to around 400 people, and two new congregations were planted. In 1990 Ichthus had 43 congregations; in 1992, Ichthus had 47 congregations, and was split into three areas. After some rationalisation the number of congregations dropped to 27. In 2002 a further major change involved a number of churches disaffiliating and forming a separate group known as Transform Network; still others became independent. Ichthus congregations meet across London as well as in Essex and Kent.

Approximately 130 other churches and movements across the UK and Europe are linked with Ichthus Christian Fellowship. In comparison to other BNCM streams, the Ichthus link relationship is reasonably loose, denoting shared theology, vision and values, rather than an attempt to create a larger identity (such as Newfrontiers and the Pioneer Network).

== Vision ==
Ichthus is characterised by "social and racial inclusiveness", according to Peter Hocken. Ichthus theology is also non-Calvinist, and shares much with open theism; believes in the practice of spiritual warfare and takes an egalitarian position on the issue of women's leadership, (both formal and informal), with congregations led by women. Ichthus identifies Anabaptism as the Christian tradition that has been most influential in its development. Ichthus has committed itself to social action, which has included starting a primary school, a launderette, action for the unemployed, pregnancy advice and other similar projects.

Ichthus has not identified with the Restorationist stream within the BNCM. Forster differed with them on their anti-denominational stance, stating that the current multiplicity of church identities was not in itself, a key problem. Even though he had been part of the core group that developed around Arthur Wallis, he became uneasy with their emphasis on separation. Hewitt says: "Any emphasis on 'new' churches to the virtual exclusion of the 'old' seemed to him both ignorant and arrogant." Instead of being distant from other churches, therefore, Ichthus has tended towards ecumenism and cooperation. Indeed, for many years the notable Christian musician Graham Kendrick was a member of Ichthus, and it was here that March for Jesus, the worldwide cross-church movement of street proclamation, began.

== Conferences ==
Each year Ichthus hosts several conferences, one or two specifically for its leadership and the rest open to the public. Ichthus also hosts a Bible School, running on the first Saturday of each month from September to April, open to all. The main gathering point of the year is a summer Bible Camp known as Revive, held at Ashburnham Place, which is an opportunity for those sympathetic with Ichthus theology and distinctives to come together.

== See also ==
- Apostolic-Prophetic movement
- Independent Network Charismatic Christianity
