= Restorationism =

Belief that Christianity should return to the form of the early apostolic church

Restorationism, also known as Christian primitivism, is a religious perspective holding that the early beliefs and practices of the followers of Jesus were either lost or adulterated after the deaths of his apostles, and therefore require restoration. It is a view that often "seeks to correct faults or deficiencies, in other branches of Christianity, by appealing to the primitive church as normative model".

Efforts to restore an earlier, purer form of Christianity are frequently a response to denominationalism. As Rubel Shelly put it, "the motive behind all restoration movements is to tear down the walls of separation by a return to the practice of the original, essential and universal features of the Christian religion." Different groups have attempted to implement the restorationist vision in various ways; for instance, some have focused on the structure and practice of the church, others on the ethical life of the church, and still others on the direct experience of the Holy Spirit in the life of the believer. The relative importance assigned to the restoration ideal, and the extent to which the full restoration of the early church is believed to have been achieved, also varies among groups.

The term has been used in reference to the Stone–Campbell Movement in the United States, as well as certain bodies of the holiness movement that emphasize that true believers are members of the "church of God" and thus use this locution in their name, such as the Church of God (Anderson, Indiana), Church of God (Holiness), and Church of God (Guthrie, Oklahoma); these denominations do not keep membership rolls. It has also been used by more recent groups describing their goal to re-establish Christianity in its original form, such as some anti-denominational Charismatic Restorationists, which arose in the 1970s in the United Kingdom and elsewhere.

More narrowly, the term "Restorationism" is used to describe a number of unrelated non-Trinitarian movements, such as the Christadelphians (from the Greek for "Brothers of Christ"), Swedenborgians (also known as, The New Church), Irvingians (the largest of which is the New Apostolic Church), The Church of Jesus Christ of Latter-day Saints (also known as Mormonism), Jehovah's Witnesses (from the tetragrammaton for God), Christian Scientists, La Luz del Mundo (Spanish for "the Light of the World"), and Iglesia ni Cristo (Tagalog for "Church of Christ"). In this sense, Restorationism has been regarded as one of the six taxonomic groupings of Christianity: the Church of the East, Oriental Orthodoxy, Eastern Orthodoxy, Roman Catholicism, Protestantism, and Restorationism. These Restorationist groups share a belief that historic Christianity lost the true faith during the Great Apostasy and that the Church needed to be restored.

== Uses of the term ==
The terms restorationism, restorationist and restoration are used in several senses within Christianity. "Restorationism" in the sense of "Christian primitivism" refers to the attempt to correct perceived shortcomings of the current church by using the primitive church as a model to reconstruct early Christianity, and has also been described as "practicing church the way it is perceived to have been done in the New Testament".

Restorationism is called "apostolic" as representing the form of Christianity that the Twelve Apostles followed. These themes arise early in church history, first appearing in the works of Iranaeus, and appeared in some movements during the Middle Ages. It was expressed to varying degrees in the theology of the Protestant Reformation, and Protestantism has been described as "a form of Christian restorationism, though some of its forms – for example the Churches of Christ – are more restorationist than others".

A number of historical movements within Christianity may be described as "restoration movements", including the Glasites in Scotland and England, the independent church led by James Haldane and Robert Haldane in Scotland, the American Restoration Movement, the Landmarkists and the Mormons. A variety of more contemporary movements have also been described as "restorationist". Restorationism has been described as a basic component of some Pentecostal movements such as the Assemblies of God. The terms "Restorationism movement" and "Restorationist movement" have also been applied to the British New Church Movement.

Capitalized, the term is also used as a synonym for the American Restoration Movement. The term "restorationism" can also include the belief that the Jewish people must be restored to the promised land in fulfillment of biblical prophecy before the Second Coming of Christ. Christian restorationism is generally used to describe the 19th century movement based on this belief, though the term Christian Zionism is more commonly used to describe later forms.

The term primitive, in contrast with other uses, refers to a basis in scholarship and research into the actual writings of the Church Fathers and other historical documents. Since written documents for the underground first-century church are sparse, the primitive church passed down its knowledge verbally. Elements of the primitive Christianity movement reject the patristic tradition of the prolific extrabiblical 2nd- and 3rd-century redaction of this knowledge (the Ante-Nicene Fathers), and instead attempt to reconstruct primitive church practices as they might have existed in the Apostolic Age. To do this, they revive practices found in the Old Testament. The term apostolic refers to a nonmainstream, often literal, apostolic succession or historical lineage tracing back to the Apostles and the Great Commission. These restorationist threads are sometimes regarded critically as being Judaizers in the Ebionite tradition.

== Historical models ==
The restoration ideal has been interpreted and applied in a variety of ways. Four general historical models can be identified based on the aspect of early Christianity that the individuals and groups involved were attempting to restore. These are:

- Ecclesiastical Primitivism;
- Ethical Primitivism;
- Experiential Primitivism; and
- Gospel Primitivism.

=== Ecclesiastical Primitivism ===
Ecclesiastical primitivism focuses on restoring the ecclesiastical practices of the early church. The didache, an early Christian treatise predominantly dated to the first century, describes a central role of central itinerant apostles, as well as community-based elders and deacons elected by the community. Huldrych Zwingli, John Calvin and the Puritans all advocated ecclesiastical primitivism. The strongest advocate of ecclesiastical primitivism in the United States was Alexander Campbell.

=== Ethical Primitivism ===
Ethical primitivism focuses on restoring the ethical norms and commitment to discipleship of the early church. Ethical commitments and norms are described in first century primitive Christian writings: Pauline writings reject gentiles taking on the “yoke of slavery;” the didache of Syria does not require gentile Christians to keep the full law perfectly, but instructs them to “keep as much [of the law]… as they can ‘bear’.”

The movement often requires observance of universal commandments, such as a biblical Sabbath as given to Adam and Eve in the Garden of Eden, and the Hebrew calendar to define years, seasons, weeks, and days. Circumcision, animal sacrifices, and ceremonial requirements, as practiced in Judaism, are distinguished from the Ten Commandments, Noahide laws and High Sabbaths as given to, and in effect for, all humanity. The Sermon on the Mount and particularly the Expounding of the Law warn against antinomianism, the rejection of biblical teachings concerning observance of the Law.

The Anabaptists, Barton W. Stone and the Holiness Movement are examples of this form of restorationism.

=== Experiential Primitivism ===
Experiential primitivism focuses on restoring the direct communication with God and the experience of the Holy Spirit seen in the early church. Examples include the Latter Day Saint movement of Joseph Smith and Pentecostalism.

=== Gospel Primitivism ===
Gospel primitivism may be best seen in the theology of Martin Luther. Luther was not, in the strictest sense, a restorationist because he saw human effort to restore the church as works righteousness and was sharply critical of other Reformation leaders who were attempting to do so. On the other hand, he was convinced that the gospel message had been obscured by the Roman Catholic Church of the time. He also rejected church traditions he considered contrary to Scripture and insisted on scripture as the sole authority for the church.

These models are not mutually exclusive, but overlap; for example, the Pentecostal movement sees a clear link between ethical primitivism and experiential primitivism.

== Middle Ages ==
According to American Jewish historian Barbara Tuchman, beginning in about 1470 a succession of Popes focused on the acquisition of money, their role in Italian politics as rulers of the papal states and power politics within the college of cardinals. Restorationism at the time was centered on movements that wanted to renew the church, such as the Lollards, the Brethren of the Common Life, the Hussites, and Girolamo Savonarola's reforms in Florence.

While these pre-reformation movements did presage and sometimes discussed a break with Rome and papal authority, they also provoked restorationist movements within the church, such as the councils of Constance and Basle, which were held in the first half of the 15th century.

Preachers at the time regularly harangued delegates to these conferences regarding simony, venality, lack of chastity and celibacy, and the holding of multiple benefices. The lack of success of the restorationist movements led, arguably, to the Protestant Reformation.

== Protestant Reformation ==
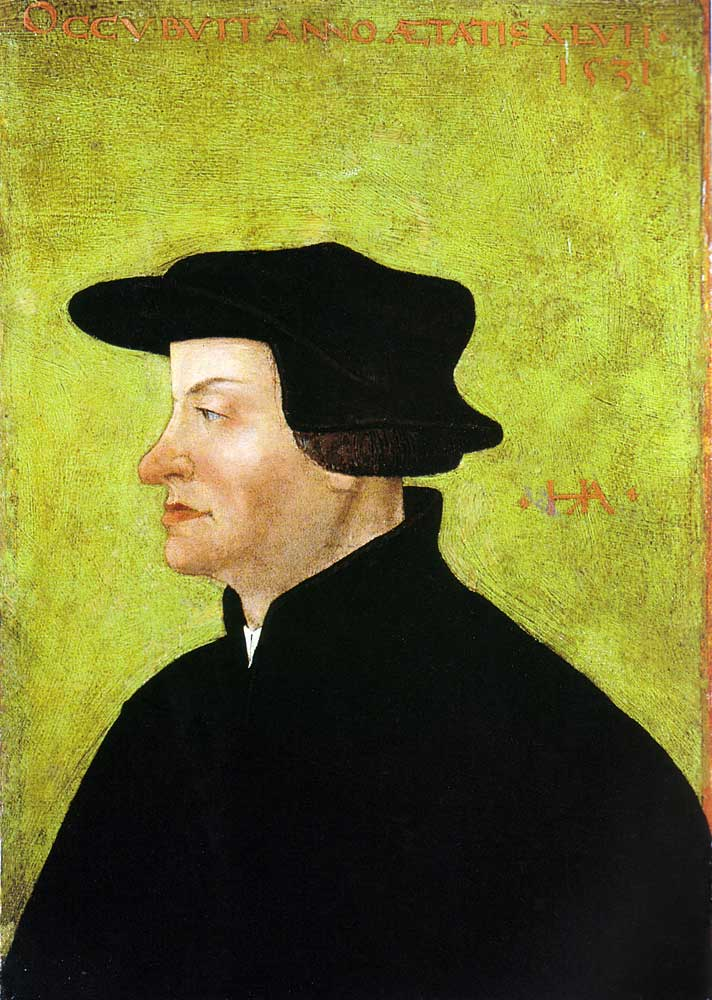
Huldrych Zwingli as depicted by Hans Asper in an oil portrait from 1531, Kunstmuseum Winterthur.

The Protestant Reformation came about through an impulse to repair the Church and return it to what the reformers saw as its original biblical structure, belief, and practice, and was motivated by a sense that "the medieval church had allowed its traditions to clutter the way to God with fees and human regulations and thus to subvert the gospel of Christ." At the heart of the Reformation, in the view of later Protestants, was an emphasis on "scripture alone" (sola scriptura).

As a result, the authority of church tradition, believed to have taken practical precedence over scripture, was rejected. The Protestant Reformation was not a monolithic movement, but consisted of at least three identifiable sub-currents. One was centered in Germany, one was centered in Switzerland, and the third was centered in England. While these movements shared some common concerns, each had its own particular emphasis.

=== German ===
The Lutheran approach can be described as one of "reformation," seeking "to reform and purify the historic, institutional church while at the same time preserving as much of the tradition as possible." The Lutheran Churches traditionally sees themselves as the "main trunk of the historical Christian Tree" founded by Christ and the Apostles, holding that during the Reformation, at the Council of Trent, the Church of Rome fell away. As such, the Augsburg Confession, the Lutheran confession of faith, teaches that "the faith as confessed by Luther and his followers is nothing new, but the true catholic faith, and that their churches represent the true catholic or universal church". When the Lutherans presented the Augsburg Confession to Charles V, Holy Roman Emperor, they explained "that each article of faith and practice was true first of all to Holy Scripture, and then also to the teaching of the church fathers and the councils".

=== Swiss ===
In contrast, the Reformed approach can be described as one of "restoration," seeking "to restore the essence and form of the primitive church based on biblical precedent and example; tradition received scant respect." While Luther focused on the question "How can we find forgiveness of sins?", the early Reformed theologians turned to the Bible for patterns that could be used to replace traditional forms and practices. Heinrich Bullinger and Martin Bucer in particular emphasized the restoration of biblical patterns. John Calvin reflected an intermediate position between that of Luther and Reformed theologians such as Zwingli, stressing biblical precedents for church governance, but as a tool to more effectively proclaim the gospel rather than as ends in themselves.

Luther opposed efforts to restore "biblical forms and structures," because he saw human efforts to restore the church as works righteousness. He did seek the "marks of the true church," but was concerned that by focusing on forms and patterns could lead to the belief that by "restoring outward forms alone one has restored the essence." Thus, Luther believed that restoring the gospel was the first step in renewing the church, rather than restoring biblical forms and patterns. In this sense, Luther can be described as a gospel restorationist, even though his approach was very different from that of other restorationists.

Protestant groups have generally accepted history as having some "jurisdiction" in Christian faith and life; the question has been the extent of that jurisdiction. A commitment to history and primitivism are not mutually exclusive; while some groups attempt to give full jurisdiction to the primitive church, for others the apostolic "first times" are given only partial jurisdiction.

=== English ===
Perhaps the most primitivist minded of the Protestant Reformation era were a group of scholars within the Church of England known as the Caroline Divines, who flourished in the 1600s during the reigns of Charles I and Charles II. They regularly appealed to the Primitive Church as the basis for their reforms. Unlike many other Christian Primitivists, the Church of the England and the Caroline Divines did not subject Scriptural interpretation to individual human reason, but rather to the hermeneutical consensus of the Church Fathers, holding to the doctrine of Prima Scriptura as opposed to Sola Scriptura. They did not hold to the separatist ecclesiology of many primitivist groups, but rather saw themselves as working within the historic established church to return it to its foundation in Scripture and the patristic tradition. Among the Caroline Divines were men like Archbishop William Laud, Bishop Jeremy Taylor, Deacon Nicholas Ferrar and the Little Gidding Community and others.

== First Great Awakening ==
Methodism

Methodism began in the 18th century as a Christian Primitivist movement within the Church of England. John Wesley and his brother Charles, the founders of the movement, were high church Anglican priests in the vein of the Caroline Divines, who had a deep respect for the Primitive Church, which they generally defined as the Church before the Council Of Nicea. Unlike many other Christian Primitivists, the Wesleys and the early Methodists did not subject Scriptural interpretation to individual human reason, but rather to the hermeneutical consensus of the Ante-Nicene Fathers, holding to a view of authority more akin to Prima Scriptura rather than Sola Scriptura.

They did not hold to the separatist ecclesiology of many primitivist groups, but rather saw themselves as working within the historic established church to return it to its foundation in Scripture and the tradition of the pre-Nicene Church. John Wesley very regularly asserted Methodism's commitment to the Primitive Church, saying, "From a child I was taught to love and reverence the Scripture, the oracles of God; and, next to these, to esteem the primitive Fathers, the writers of the first three centuries. Next after the primitive church, I esteemed our own, the Church of England, as the most Scriptural national Church in the world."

And, "Methodism, so called, is the old religion, the religion of the Bible, the religion of the primitive Church, the religion of the Church of England." On his epitaph is written, "This GREAT LIGHT arose (By the Singular providence of GOD) To enlighten THESE NATIONS, And to revive, enforce, and defend, The Pure Apostolical DOCTRINES and PRACTICES of THE PRIMITIVE CHURCH…"

=== Separate Baptists ===
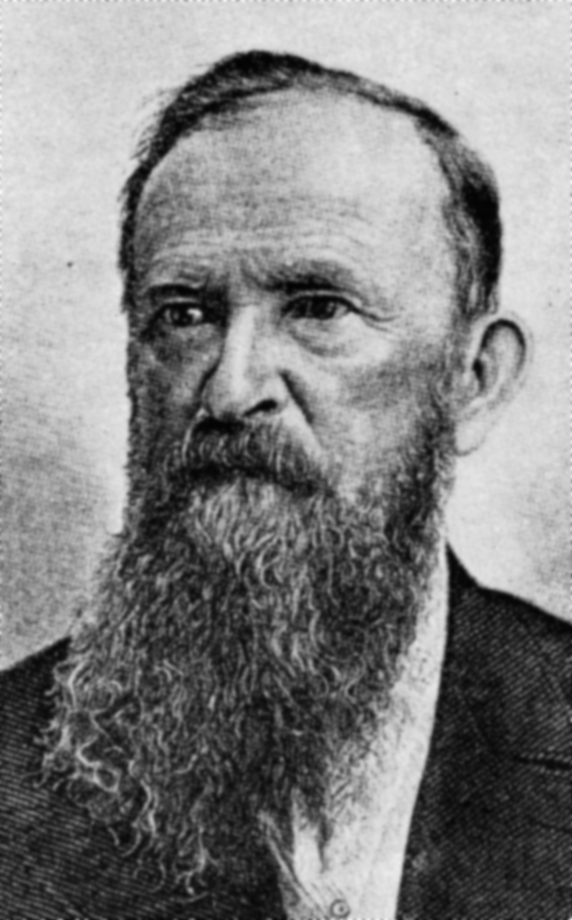
James Robinson Graves

During the First Great Awakening, a movement developed among the Baptists known as Separate Baptists. Two themes of this movement were the rejection of creeds and "freedom in the Spirit." The Separate Baptists saw scripture as the "perfect rule" for the church. While they turned to the Bible for a structural pattern for the church, they did not insist on complete agreement on the details of that pattern. This group originated in New England, but was especially strong in the South where the emphasis on a biblical pattern for the church grew stronger.

In the last half of the 18th century it spread to the western frontier of Kentucky and Tennessee, where the Stone and Campbell movements would later take root. The development of the Separate Baptists in the southern frontier helped prepare the ground for the Restoration Movement, as the membership of both the Stone and Campbell groups drew heavily from among the ranks of the Separate Baptists.

Separate Baptist restorationism also contributed to the development of the Landmark Baptists in the same area at about the same time as the Stone-Campbell Restoration Movement. Under the leadership of James Robinson Graves, this group looked for a precise blueprint for the primitive church, believing that any deviation from that blueprint would keep one from being part of the true church.

== Groups arising in the era of the Second Great Awakening ==
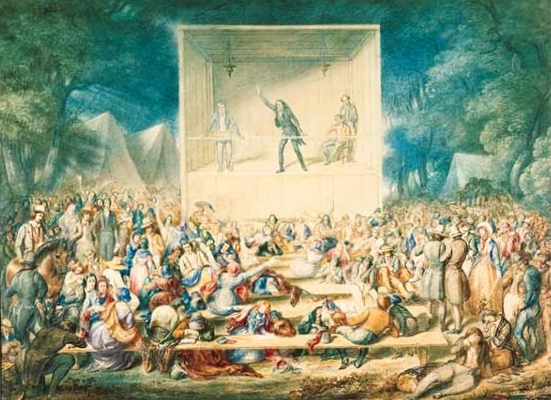
A 1839 Methodist camp meeting, watercolor from the Second Great Awakening. Methodist preachers taught the doctrines of the New Birth and entire sanctification to the masses.

The ideal of restoring a "primitive" form of Christianity grew in popularity in the United States after the American Revolution. This desire to restore a purer form of Christianity played a role in the development of many groups during this period, known as the Second Great Awakening, including the Mormons, Baptists and Shakers. Several factors made the restoration sentiment particularly appealing during this time period.

- To immigrants in the early 19th century, the land in America seemed pristine, edenic and undefiled - "the perfect place to recover pure, uncorrupted and original Christianity" - and the tradition-bound European churches seemed out of place in this new setting.
- The new American democracy seemed equally fresh and pure, a restoration of the kind of just government that God intended.
- Many believed that the new nation would usher in a new millennial age.
- Independence from the traditional churches of Europe was appealing to many Americans who were enjoying a new political independence.
- A primitive faith based on the Bible alone promised a way to sidestep the competing claims of all the many denominations available and find assurance of being right without the security of an established national church.

Camp meetings fueled the Second Great Awakening, which served as an "organizing process" that created "a religious and educational infrastructure" across the trans-Appalachian frontier that encompassed social networks, a religious journalism that provided mass communication, and church related colleges.

=== Warner-Brooks Restorationism ===
The work of two leaders in the Wesleyan-Holiness movement, Daniel Sidney Warner (1842–95) and John Petit Brooks (1826-1915), contributed to founding of the Church of God (Anderson, Indiana) and the Church of God (Holiness). While holding to the Methodist soteriology of the holiness movement, Warner and Brooks held that the New Testament "provided a specific plan for church government and that local congregations should be set in order according to that plan". The denominations that emerged from Warner-Brooks Restoration theology (such as the Church of God (Anderson, Indiana), the Church of God (Holiness), and the Church of God (Guthrie, Oklahoma) teach that the church of God consists of those who have experienced the New Birth (first work of grace) and entire sanctification (second work of grace). The name "Church of God" is derived from the Bible, being "used to describe the body of Christ in 1 Corinthians 1:2; 10:32; 11:22; 15:9; 2 Corinthians 1:2; Galatians 1:13; and 1 Timothy 3:5." In congregations of the Warner-Brooks Restoration tradition, no membership rolls are recorded "for true saints recognized one another".

=== Churches of God General Conference (Winebrenner) ===
The Churches of God, General Conference have been characterized as Restorationist, with the name of the denomination reflecting the theology of John Winebrenner that “there is but one true Church, namely: the Church of God.” John Winebrenner insisted "upon a personal conversion experience as a hallmark of genuine Christian faith" and he rejected the "use of all creeds and catechisms." These views were adoped by the Church of God, General Conference that was founded by Winebrenner and five other ministers.

=== Stone-Campbell Restoration Movement ===
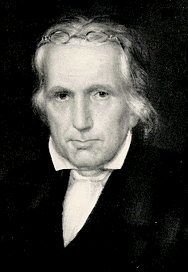
Thomas Campbell

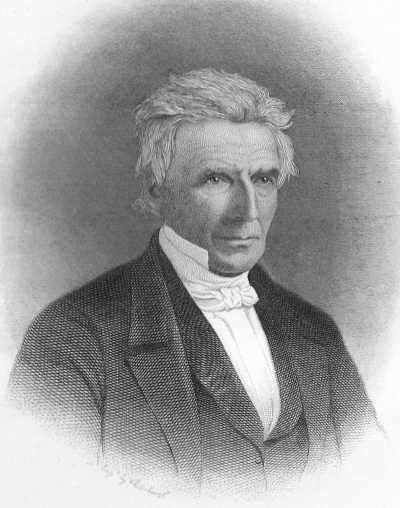
Alexander Campbell

The Stone-Campbell Restoration Movement aimed to restore the church and sought "the unification of all Christians in a single body patterned after the church of the New Testament." While the Restoration Movement developed from several independent efforts to go back to apostolic Christianity, two groups that independently developed similar approaches to the Christian faith were particularly important to its development. The first, led by Barton W. Stone began at Cane Ridge, Bourbon County, Kentucky and called themselves simply Christians. The second began in western Pennsylvania and Virginia, now West Virginia, and was led by Thomas Campbell and his son, Alexander Campbell. They used the name Disciples of Christ.

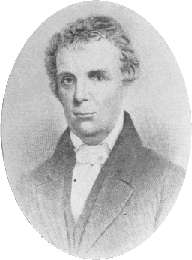
Barton W. Stone

The Campbell movement was characterized by a "systematic and rational reconstruction" of the early church, in contrast to the Stone movement which was characterized by radical freedom and lack of dogma. Despite their differences, the two movements agreed on several critical issues. Both saw restoring apostolic Christianity as a means of hastening the millennium. Both also saw restoring the early church as a route to Christian freedom. Both believed that unity among Christians could be achieved by using apostolic Christianity as a model. They were united, among other things, in the belief that Jesus is the Christ, the Son of God; that Christians should celebrate the Lord's Supper on the first day of each week; and that baptism of adult believers by immersion in water is a necessary condition for salvation. Because the founders wanted to abandon all denominational labels, they used the biblical names for the followers of Jesus that they found in the Bible. The commitment of both movements to restoring the early church and to uniting Christians was enough to motivate a union between many in the two movements.

With the merger, there was the challenge of what to call the new movement. Clearly, finding a biblical, non-sectarian name was important. Stone wanted to continue to use the name "Christians." Alexander Campbell insisted upon "Disciples of Christ". As a result, both names were used.

The Restoration Movement began during, and was greatly influenced by, the Second Great Awakening. While the Campbells resisted what they saw as the spiritual manipulation of the camp meetings, the Southern phase of the Awakening "was an important matrix of Barton Stone's reform movement" and shaped the evangelistic techniques used by both Stone and the Campbells.

The Restoration Movement has seen several divisions, resulting in multiple separate groups. Three modern groups originating in the U.S. claim the Stone-Campbell movement as their roots: Churches of Christ, Christian churches and churches of Christ, and the Christian Church (Disciples of Christ). Some see divisions in the movement as the result of the tension between the goals of restoration and ecumenism, with the churches of Christ and the Christian churches and churches of Christ resolving the tension by stressing restoration while the Christian Church (Disciples of Christ) resolved the tension by stressing ecumenism. Non-U.S. churches associated with this movement include the Churches of Christ in Australia and the Evangelical Christian Church in Canada.

=== Adventism ===
Adventism is a Christian eschatological belief that looks for the imminent Second Coming of Jesus to inaugurate the Kingdom of God. This view involves the belief that Jesus will return to receive those who have died in Christ and those who are awaiting his return, and that they must be ready when he returns. Adventists are considered to be both restorationists and conservative Protestants.

==== Millerism and Seventh-day Sabbatarianism ====
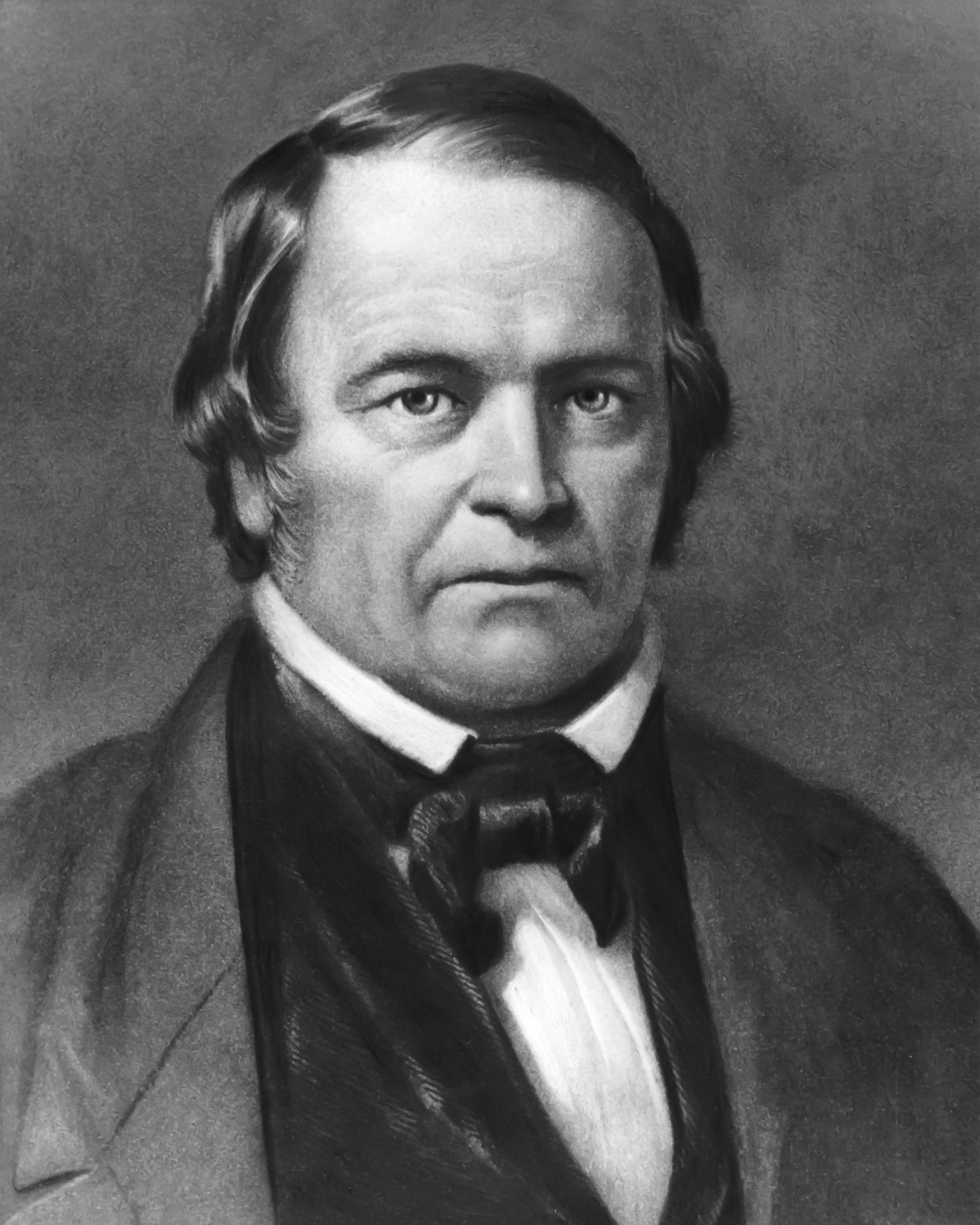
William Miller

The Millerites were the most well-known family of the Adventist movements. They emphasized apocalyptic teachings anticipating the end of the world, and did not look for the unity of Christendom but busied themselves in preparation for Christ's return. Millerites sought to restore a prophetic immediacy and uncompromising biblicism that they believed had once existed but had long been rejected by mainstream Protestant and Catholic churches. From the Millerites descended the Seventh-day Adventists and the Advent Christian Church.

==== Seventh-day Adventists ====
The Seventh-day Adventist Church grew out of the Adventist movement, in particular the Millerites. The Seventh-day Adventist Church is the largest of several Adventist groups which arose from the Millerite movement of the 1840s in upstate New York, a phase of the Second Great Awakening. Important to the Seventh-day Adventist movement is a belief in progressive revelation, teaching that the Christian life and testimony is intended to be typified by the Spirit of Prophecy, as explained in the writings of Ellen G. White.

Much of the theology of the Seventh-day Adventist Church corresponds to Protestant Christian teachings such as the Trinity and the infallibility of Scripture. Distinctive teachings include the unconscious state of the dead and the doctrine of an investigative judgment. The church is also known for its emphasis on diet and health, its holistic understanding of the person, its promotion of religious liberty, and its conservative principles and lifestyle.

==== Worldwide Church of God ====
The Worldwide Church of God arose from the Seventh Day churches. The personal ministry of Herbert W. Armstrong became the Radio Church of God, which became the Worldwide Church of God. It later splintered into many other churches and groups when the Worldwide Church of God disassociated itself with the Restoration movements and made major attempts to join the Protestant branch of Christianity. The largest of these groups, the Living Church of God and the United Church of God, continue in the tradition of the Worldwide Church of God as it was under the leadership of Herbert W. Armstrong.

==== Advent Christian Church ====
The Advent Christian Church is unaffiliated with Seventh-day Adventism, but considers itself the second "of six Christian denominations that grew out of the ministry of William Miller". As a "first-day" body of Adventist Christians established by The Advent Christian General Conference in 1860, the church's beliefs include "conditional immortality" and a form of "soul sleep".

Advent Christians such as George Storrs and Jonas Wendell influenced the Bible Student movement.

=== Nontrinitarian Restorationists ===
==== Christadelphians ====
John Thomas (April 12, 1805 – March 5, 1871), was a devout convert to the Restoration Movement after a shipwreck at sea on his emigration to America brought to focus his inadequate understanding of the Bible, and what would happen to him at death. This awareness caused him to devote his life to the study of the Bible and he promoted interpretations of it which were at variance with the mainstream Christian views the Restoration Movement held. In particular he questioned the nature of man.

He held a number of debates with one of the leaders of the movement, Alexander Campbell, on these topics but eventually agreed to stop because he found the practice bestowed no further practical merits to his personal beliefs and it had the potential to create division. He later determined that salvation was dependent upon having the theology he had developed for baptism to be effective for salvation and published a "Confession and Abjuration" of his previous position on March 3, 1847. He was also rebaptised.

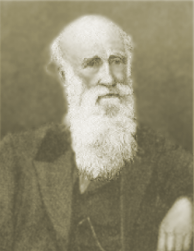
John Thomas

Following his abjuration and rebaptism he went to England on a preaching tour in June 1848 including Reformation Movement churches, Although his abjuration and his disfellowship in America were reported in the British churches magazines certain churches in the movement still allowed him to present his views. Thomas also gained a hearing in Unitarian and Adventist churches through his promotion of the concept of "independence of thought" with regards to interpreting the Bible.

Through a process of creed setting and division the Christadelphian movement emerged with a distinctive set of doctrines incorporating Adventism, anti-trinitarianism, the belief that God is a "substantial and corporeal" being, objection to military service, a lay-membership with full participation by all members, and other doctrines consistent with the spirit of the Restorationist movement. One consequence of objection to military service was the adoption of the name Christadelphians to distinguish this small community of believers and to be granted exemption from military service in the American Civil War.

==== Swedenborgians ====
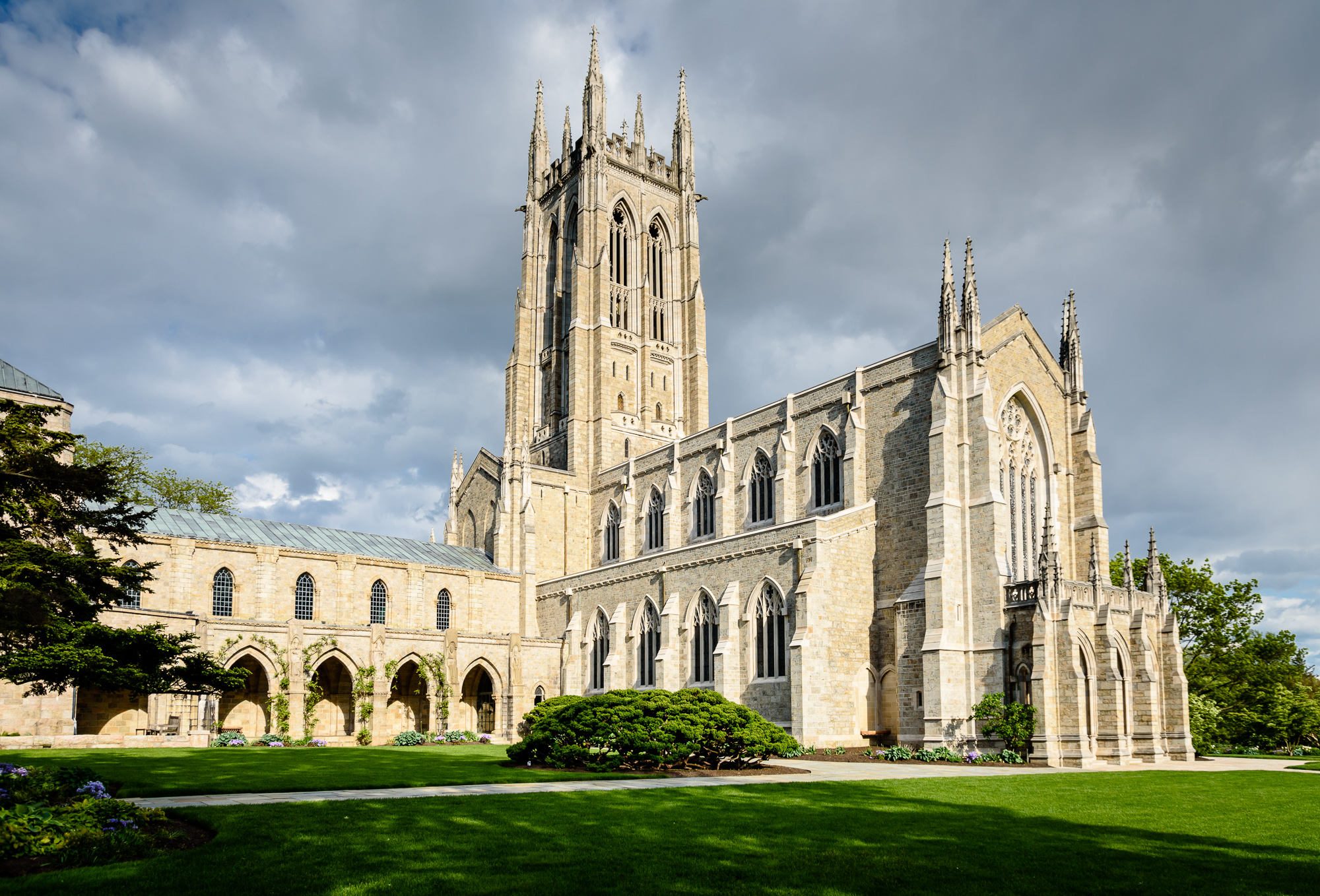
Bryn Athyn Cathedral, the episcopal seat of the General Church of the New Jerusalem, a Swedenborgian Christian denomination

The New Church was founded on the basis of the theology of Emanuel Swedenborg. As such, it is often known as the Swedenborgian Church. The New Church's view of God is that "Jesus is God incarnate, not (as certain interpretations of the traditional Christian trinity contend) an emanation of the Godhead." The New Church propounds the doctrine of Correspondence, which teaches that "Every word or fact of the Bible corresponded to a spiritual truth or mystical truth." Additionally, The New Church teaches that "Objects in the physical world have spiritual correspondences."

==== Irvingians ====
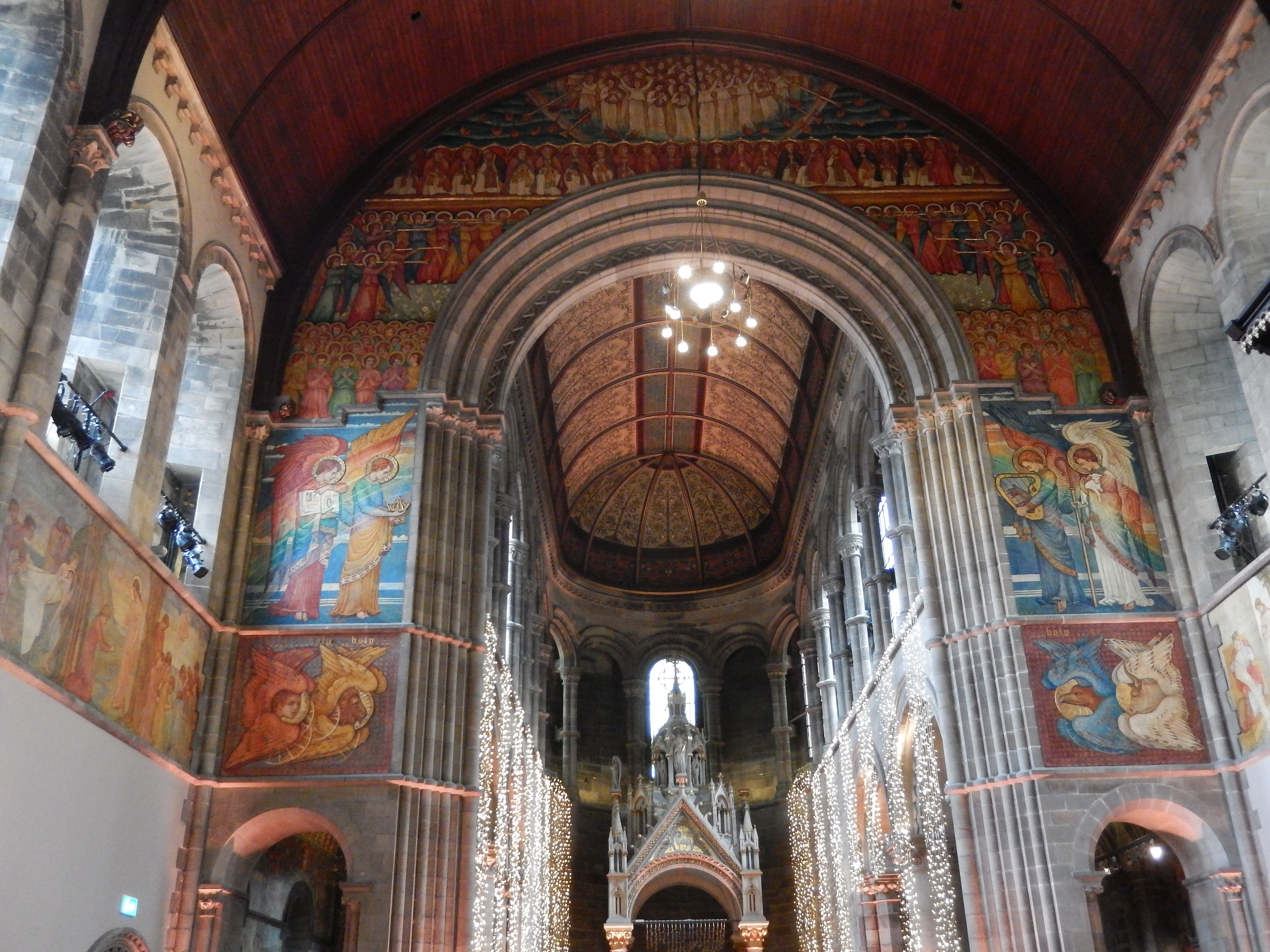
Mansfield Place Church, a former cathedral of the Catholic Apostolic Church in Edinburgh, UK

The Catholic Apostolic Church (Irvingian Church) was founded according to the theology of Edward Irving (1792–1834), who taught that "God could work miracles in His Church as easily now as two thousand years ago." Belonging to the Restorationist branch of Christianity, the Irvingian Churches teach that they "exercise the charismata of the Apostolic age". The church was organised in 1835 with the fourfold ministry of "apostles, prophets, evangelists, and pastors."

As a result of schism within the Catholic Apostolic Church, other Irvingian Christian denominations emerged, including the Old Apostolic Church, New Apostolic Church, Reformed Old Apostolic Church and United Apostolic Church; of these, the New Apostolic Church is the largest Irvingian Christian denomination today, with 16 million members. Irvingianism, possessing elaborate liturgies, teaches three sacraments: Baptism, Holy Communion and Holy Sealing.

==== Latter Day Saint movement ====
Adherents to the Latter Day Saint movement believe that founder Joseph Smith was a prophet of God, chosen to restore the primitive, apostolic church established by Jesus. Like other restorationist groups, members believe that the church and priesthood established by Jesus were withdrawn from the Earth after the end of the apostolic age and before the First Council of Nicaea in 325.

Unlike other reformers, who based their movements on their own interpretations of the Bible, Joseph Smith and Oliver Cowdery held that they were visited by John the Baptist to receive the Aaronic Priesthood, and then by the apostles Peter, James, and John to receive the Melchizedek Priesthood. This restoration authorized members to receive revelation from God in order to restore the original apostolic organization lost after the events of the New Testament. According to Allen and Hughes, "[n]o group used the language of 'restoration' more consistently and more effectively than did the [Latter Day Saints] ... early Mormons seemed obsessed with restoring the ancient church of God."

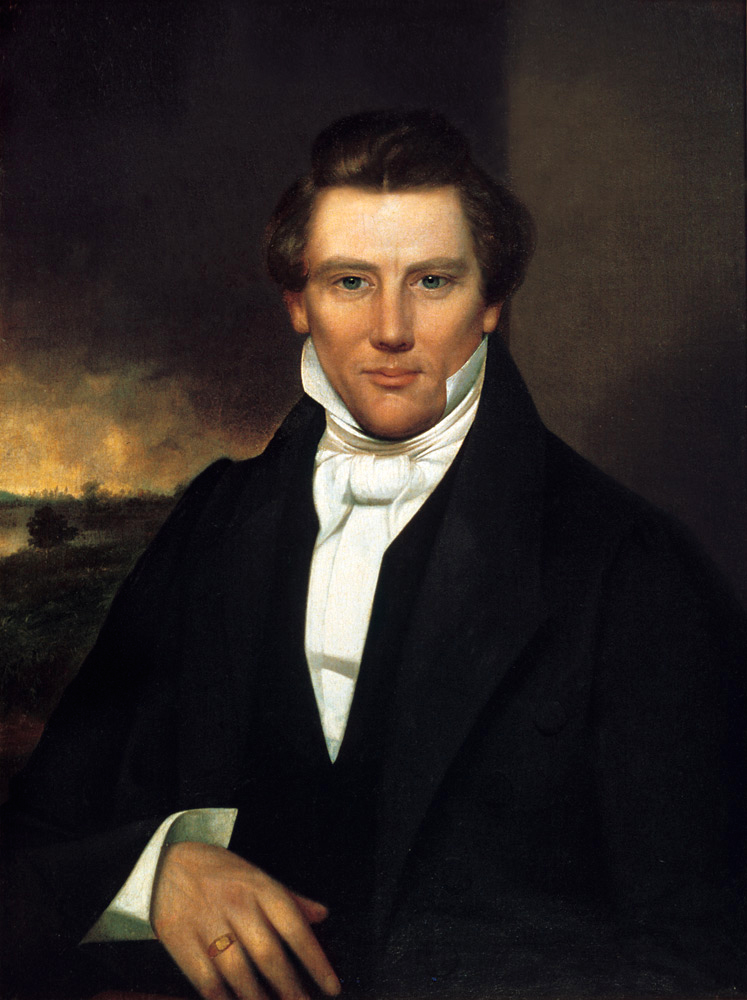
Joseph Smith

According to Smith, God appeared to him in 1820, instructing him that the creeds of the churches of the day were corrupted. In addition to restoring the primitive church, Smith claimed to receive new and ongoing revelations. In 1830, he published The Book of Mormon, which he and witnesses declared to be a translation through divine means from the Golden Plates he obtained from an angel.

The largest and most well known church in the Latter Day Saint movement is the Church of Jesus Christ of Latter-day Saints (LDS Church), followed by Community of Christ (formerly RLDS), and dozens of other denominations. Members of the LDS Church believe that, in addition to Smith being the first prophet appointed by Jesus in the "latter days", every subsequent apostle and church president also serves in the capacity of prophet, seer and revelator.

Some among the Churches of Christ have attributed the restorationist character of the Latter Day Saints movement to the influence of Sidney Rigdon, who was associated with the Campbell movement in Ohio but left it and became a close friend of Joseph Smith. Neither the Mormons nor the early Restoration Movement leaders invented the idea of "restoration"; it was a popular theme of the time that had developed independently of both, and Mormonism and the Restoration Movement represent different expressions of that common theme.

The two groups had very different approaches to the restoration ideal. The Campbell movement combined it with Enlightenment rationalism, "precluding emotionalism, spiritualism, or any other phenomena that could not be sustained by rational appeals to the biblical text." The Latter Day Saints combined it with "the spirit of nineteenth-century Romanticism" and, as a result, "never sought to recover the forms and structures of the ancient church as ends in themselves" but "sought to restore the golden age, recorded in both Old Testament and New Testament, when God broke into human history and communed directly with humankind." Mormons gave priority to current revelation. Primitive observances of "appointed times" like Sabbath were secondary to continuing revelation, similarly to the progressive revelation held by some non-restorationist Christian theologians.

The "Great Apostasy", or loss of the original church Jesus established, has been cited with historical evidence of changes in Christian doctrine over time, scriptures prophesying of a coming apostasy before the last days (particularly 2 Thessalonians 2:1–3, 2 Timothy 4:3–4 and Amos 8:11–12) and corruption within the early churches that led to the necessity of the Protestant Reformation, which is seen as an important step towards the development of protected freedoms and speech required for a full restoration to be possible.

== Other groups originating in the nineteenth century ==
=== Bible Students ===
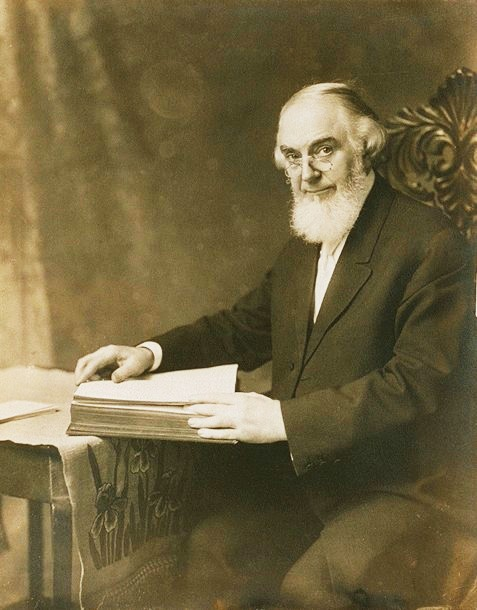
Charles Russell in 1911

In the 1870s, a Bible study group led by Charles Taze Russell formed into what was eventually called the Bible Student movement. Russell's congregations did not consider him to be the founder of a new religion, but that he helped in restoring true Christianity from the apostasy that Jesus and the Apostle Paul foretold. They believed that other Churches departed in a Great Apostasy from the original faith on major points, and that the original faith could be restored through a generally literal interpretation of the Bible and a sincere commitment to follow its teachings. They focused on several key doctrinal points that they considered a return to "primitive Christianity", derived from their interpretation of the Bible, including active proselytization; strict neutrality in political affairs; abstinence from warfare; a belief in the imminent manifestation of the Kingdom of God (or World to Come) on Earth, and a rejection of trinitarianism, the immortality of the soul, and the definition of Hell as a place of eternal torment.

==== Jehovah's Witnesses ====
Jehovah's Witnesses emerged as a distinct religious organization, maintaining control of Russell's Watch Tower Bible and Tract Society and other corporations. They continued to develop doctrines that they considered to be an improved restoration of first century Christianity, including increased emphasis on the use of Jehovah as God's personal name.

=== Plymouth Brethren ===
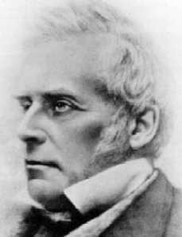
John Nelson Darby

The Plymouth Brethren is a conservative, Evangelical, restorationist movement whose origin can be traced to Dublin, Ireland, in 1827. The title, "The Brethren", is one that many of their number are comfortable with, in that the Bible designates all believers as "brethren". The first English assembly was in Plymouth in 1831, where the movement became well known and assemblies diffused throughout Europe and beyond.

It was organised primarily by George Wigram, Benjamin Wills Newton and John Nelson Darby. The movement soon spread throughout the UK. By 1845, the first English assembly in Plymouth had over 1,000 souls in fellowship.

They became known as "the brethren from Plymouth", and were soon simply called "Plymouth Brethren". By 1848, divergence of practice and belief led to the development of two separate branches. The rift was caused primarily by a difference of opinions between John Nelson Darby and Benjamin Wills Newton in regards to eschatology. Despite more divisions, assemblies are still often generalized into two main categories: "Open Brethren" and "Exclusive Brethren". John Duncan criticized the Brethren movement saying "To end sectarianism, the Plymouth Brethren began by making a new sect, and that sect, of all sects, the most sectarian".

== 20th-century and contemporary groups ==
=== Oneness Pentecostalism ===
Pentecostalism began primarily as a restoration movement that focused on the "experiential" aspect of the early church. The early pioneers of the Pentecostal movement sought to restore the work and power of the Holy Spirit to the church, which they felt had been lost early on after the Apostolic Age. Oneness Pentecostals, in particular, continue to have a lot of restorationist themes present in their movement. Many Oneness Pentecostals see their movement as being a restoration of the Apostolic Church, which is why many of them refer to themselves as "apostolic" or to their movement as the "Apostolic Pentecostal" movement.

==== British New Church Movement ====
During the charismatic movement of the 1960s and 1970s, which focused on the transformation of the individual, some leaders formed what has become known as the Charismatic Restorationist Movement. These leaders, of whom Arthur Wallis, David Lillie and Cecil Cousen were at the forefront, focused on the nature of the church and shared a distinctive view that authentic church order was being restored to the whole church. This authentic church order centred on what is referred to as the "fivefold ministries", as listed in Ephesians 4:11: Apostles, Prophets, Evangelists, Teachers and Pastors.

Although the Charismatic Movement brought the Pentecostal gifts to the denominational churches, these restorationists considered denominationalism unbiblical, and shared a conviction that God would cause the church to be directly organized and empowered by the holy spirit. The movement has thousands of adherents worldwide, and notable church networks include Newfrontiers led by Terry Virgo, Salt and Light Ministries International led by Barney Coombs, and the Ichthus Christian Fellowship led by Faith and Roger Forster.

==== Shepherding movement ====
The British leaders of charismatic restorationism mutually recognised a parallel movement in the United States, centered on the Fort Lauderdale Five; Derek Prince, Don Basham, Bob Mumford, Charles Simpson and Ern Baxter. This movement became known as the Shepherding movement and was the subject of significant controversy in the mid-1970s. The movement left a significant legacy through its influence on contemporary ministries International Churches of Christ, Maranatha Campus Ministries and Great Commission International.

==== Apostolic-Prophetic Movement ====
More recently another form of charismatic restorationism with a similar recognition of the apostolic office has emerged in the form of the Apostolic-Prophetic Movement, centered on the Kansas City Prophets. Leading proponents of the movement include C. Peter Wagner, Rick Joyner, Mike Bickle and Lou Engle.

=== Church of God (Restoration) ===
The Church of God (Restoration) is a Christian denomination that was founded in the 1980s by Daniel (Danny) Layne. In a booklet written by Layne in the early 1980s, he claimed to be an ex-heroin addict who spent years dealing drugs and living a life of crime and sin on the streets of San Francisco. Layne was originally raised in the Church of God (Anderson), where his father was a minister. Layne began preaching in the Church of God (Guthrie, Oklahoma) after his conversion.

One tenet of this group is that they are ordained by both prophecy and divine command to restore the church of God as it was in the Book of Acts. Most of Daniel Layne's beliefs concerning the book of Revelation originated from some ministers who had left the Church of God (Anderson) reformation movement thirty or so years earlier. This teaching is upheld by the official eschatology, which is a form of church historicism. This Church of God (Restoration) teaches that the 7th Trumpet in the book of the Revelation began to sound around the year 1980 when Daniel Layne was saved, alleging that there was a general discontent among many of its current adherents that were in various Churches of God at that time. A variation of this "Seventh Seal message" had been taught in other Churches of God for approximately 50 years prior to this point.

=== Iglesia ni Cristo ===
Iglesia ni Cristo began in the Philippines and was incorporated by Felix Y. Manalo on July 27, 1914. The church professes to be the reestablishment of the original church founded by Jesus Christ and teaches that the original church was apostatized. It does not teach the doctrine of the Trinity or the divinity of Jesus. Iglesia ni Cristo does not subscribe to the term Restoration, nor does it claim to be a part of the Restorationist Movement.

=== La Luz del Mundo ===
La Luz del Mundo (full name: Iglesia del Dios Vivo, Columna y Apoyo de la Verdad, La Luz del Mundo) was founded in Mexico on 6 April 1926 by Eusebio Joaquín González (14 August 1896 – 9 June 1964), who claimed that God called him to be an apostle of Jesus Christ and renamed him Aarón. Joaquín claimed that he was commissioned to restore the primitive Christian church of the first century CE. The church, headquartered in Guadalajara, Mexico, asserts that all other forms of Christianity are corruptions that arose after the last of the original apostles died, and rejects traditional Christian doctrines such as trinitarianism, original sin, veneration of saints, and the divinity of Jesus.

It continues to claim that it is the restoration of primitive Christianity and that its leaders, including Aarón Joaquín, his son, Samuel Joaquín Flores (1937–2014), and his grandson, Naasón Joaquín García (born 1969), who is the church's international director, are apostles responsible for the restoration, without whom it would be impossible for people to truly believe in Jesus and be saved.

=== Apostolic Catholic Church (Philippines) ===
The Apostolic Catholic Church started as a mainstream Catholic lay organization that was founded in Hermosa, Bataan in the early 1970s by Maria Virginia P. Leonzon Vda. De Teruel. In 1991, the organisation and the Roman Catholic Church had a schism; due to varying issues, it formally separated itself from the Roman Catholic Church, when John Florentine Teruel was consecrated as a patriarch and registered the church as a Protestant and Independent Catholic denomination. The Church describes itself as a traditionalist Church which aims to bring back ancient Catholic Church traditions removed by previous councils and Popes.

=== Local churches ===
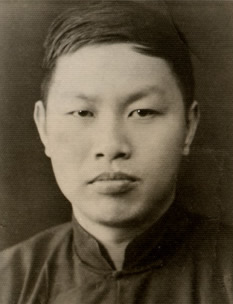
Watchman Nee

The local churches are a Christian movement influenced by the teachings of J.N. Darby, Watchman Nee and Witness Lee and associated with the Living Stream Ministry publishing house. Its members see themselves as separate from other Christian groups, denominations, and movements, part of what they sometimes call "The Lord's Recovery". One of the defining features of the local churches is their adherence to the principle that all Christians in a city or locality are automatically members of the one church in that locality. Another defining feature is the lack of an official organization or official name for the movement. Those in the local churches believe that to take a name would divide them from other believers. Thus, they often say they meet with "the church in [city name]" with the understanding that they are not the only church but belong to the same church as every believer in their city.

=== Jesuism ===
Jesuism is the personal philosophy encompassing the teachings of Jesus of Nazareth and commitment or adherence to those teachings. Jesuism is distinct from and sometimes opposed to mainstream Christianity, the organized religion based on the Christian Bible. In particular, Jesuism is distinguished from the writings attributed to the Apostle Paul and from modern Church doctrine. Jesuism is not necessarily critical of the Christian Bible or Church doctrine, but rather it does not affirm their authority over the teachings of Jesus. As a philosophy, Jesuism is characterized as naturalistic and rationalist, rejecting the conflict between faith and science.

=== World Mission Society Church Of God ===
World Mission Society Church of God is a non-denominational Christian movement founded by Ahn Sahng-Hong in 1964. The church claims to be a restoration of the original Church of God and has teachings differing from other Christian denominations. After Ahn Sahng-hong died in February 1985, a group of people in Church of God Jesus Witnesses including the man Kim Joo-cheol and the woman Zahng Gil-jah wanted to re-introduce the concept of a "spiritual mother". In March 1985, they moved from Busan to Seoul. At a meeting in Seoul in June 1985, they discussed how to call Zahng Gil-jah, and established a church called Witnesses of Ahn Sahng-hong Church of God which is led by Kim Joo-cheol and Zahng Gil-jah. Two major new doctrines were codified:

Ahn Sahng-hong should be regarded as Jesus Christ who had already come, should be titled Christ Ahn Sahng-hong, and pursuant to a traditional trinitarian view of Christian hypostasis Ahn was consequently also The Holy Spirit, God the Father, and thus God. Zahng Gil-jah should be regarded as God the Mother, a female image of God, be titled Heavenly Mother, or simply Mother, and together with Ahn Sahng-hong be regarded as God.

== Other religious movements called Restorationist ==
"Restorationism" is also used to describe a form of postmillennialism developed during the later half of the 20th century, which was influential among a number of charismatic groups and the British new church movement.

Restitutionism, is the belief "in an only temporary future punishment and a final restoration of all to the favour and presence of God; a Universalist." Some dictionaries give "restorationist" as a synonym for this.

Christian restorationism, a 19th-century movement promoting restoration of Jews to the Holy land, which later became known as Christian Zionism.

== Catholic critique of primitivism ==
The Catholic critique of primitivism and restorationism presents arguments or claims such as the following:

- First, applying scriptures such as Matthew 16:18-19 where, in the Catholic view, Jesus promised that the "gates of hell" would not prevail against his church, which would be built on the rock of Peter's authorized use of "the keys of the kingdom": In this view, Restorationism says in effect that this promise failed, which contradicts Christ's divinity and the Holy Spirit's power.
- Second, that primitivist claims about the early church are non- or anti-historical. According to the Catholic theologian Fr. Dwight Longenecker:

The Restorationists are usually totally ignorant of what the early Church was really like. They assume is that the early church was congregational, not hierarchical. They assume it was non liturgical and non sacramental. They assume it was Bible based. They assume there was no clergy and that the congregation met in people’s homes. They don’t have any evidence for these assumptions, and all of these assumptions are simply not true, or if they were true in some isolated places they are not the whole truth. [...]

The reason the Primitivists are ignorant of what the primitive Church was really like is because they are largely unaware of the writings of the Early Church fathers. Most of them do not know that we have documents telling us just what the early Christians believed, how they worshipped, how the Church was structured.

This ignorance is not only the lack of education, it is also the result of the Protestant dogma of sola Scriptura.

— Fr. Dwight Longenecker

- Third, that Christ actually intended the church's practice and doctrine to grow and develop, as is natural for any living thing: in this view, Jesus' promise to the disciples that Holy Spirit will lead them "into all truth" in John 16:13-15 is a process not an event. Thus, the ideal of primitivism is utopian and mistaken. This is the view associated with influential Catholic theologian John Henry Newman: in his Development of Christian Doctrine he gave seven "notes" which distinguish a legitimate development of doctrine from a corruption. This view does not deny that there may be accidental accretions over time which should be removed if harmful, nor that there may be primitive practices that can be fruitfully revived.
- Fourth, the inconsistency of restorationist prescriptions and restorationism's dependence on self-appointed human authority figures (who may go beyond the plain or traditional meaning of Scriptural texts to justify their teaching) with regional appeal, contrasted with the consistency and conservatism over time of the Catholic faith, and evidenced by centuries of recorded miracles, fruitful charitable lives, and notable holy saints: these views were given, for example, by Erasmus in his debate on the extent of human choice with Martin Luther.

There are also numerous semi-restorationist tendencies that are part of Catholic tradition, such as the Renaissance ad fontes humanist imperative and the modern ressourcement theology. The monastic urge to live according to the evangelical counsels may be seen as a kind of primitivism that resorts to the words of Christ rather than implied behaviours in the Book of Acts.

== See also ==
- Adventism
- David Bercot
- Christianity in the 1st century
- Christian fundamentalism
- Christian Zionism
- Catholic Apostolic Church
- Constantinian shift
- Hebrew Christian movement
- Hebrew Roots
- Jewish Christianity
- Judaizers
- Latter Day Saint movement
- Palingenesis
- Philosemitism
- The Lord's Recovery
- Members Church of God International
- Messianic Judaism
- Quakers
- Salafism
- Shakers
- Ressourcement
