= Barney Coombs =

Barney Coombs (1937– 22 July 2018) was a British religious leader, and the first leader of the International Council of Salt and Light Ministries, and Senior Leader at West Coast Christian Fellowship in Vancouver, Canada. Salt and Light is a network of neocharismatic Evangelical Christian churches that is part of the British New Church Movement. Coombs was received apostolically by many Charismatic churches in North America, Africa, India, Europe, the UK and New Zealand, and was seen as the 'father' of the Salt and Light family of churches. He was married to Janette until his death in 2018 and they had three children and eight grandchildren.

== Early life ==
Coombs was born in 1937 in Whitstable, England. After leaving school he entered the police force before becoming a Christian and responding to a call to full-time Christian ministry. He studied at Capernwray Bible School, where he graduated with honours.

== Career ==
=== Pastoral ministry ===
Coombs was ordained as pastor of Basingstoke Baptist Church (later becoming Basingstoke Community Churches) in 1966. He later moved to Canada to be based at West Coast Christian Fellowship in Vancouver. Coombs has written a number of books including A Guide to Practical Pastoring, Apostles Today, God’s Plan for Himself, Finding Your Purpose in God's Plan and Dealing with What Life Throws At You: How Life's Ups and Downs Can Lead Us to a Greater Intimacy with Jesus.

=== British New Church Movement ===
In the mid-late 1960s Coombs became involved in the restoration movement that grew around key charismatic figures such as Arthur Wallis, David Lillie and Cecil Cousen. The main thrust of this group was that a return of the 'charismatic gifts' (i.e. prophecy and speaking in tongues) to the traditional denominations was not sufficient, and that the church needed to be restored to the New Testament forms of church government as described in St. Paul's Epistle to the Ephesians - Apostle, Prophet, Evangelist and Pastor/Teacher (Eph 4:11). This became known as the fivefold ministries, and the group saw the fulfillment of these offices as essential to the reviving of the worldwide Christian Church. In Finding Your Purpose In God's Plan Coombs credits DeVern Fromke as a significant influence on the theology he and the wider group were developing at this time.

In the early 1970s Coombs became part of the "fabulous fourteen", a group of leaders who sought to develop a theology and ecclesiology that would guide the restoration of the Church. Later that decade, however, leaders of the restoration movement diverged into two separate streams. "Restoration 1" followed the more conservative teachings of Arthur Wallis and Bryn Jones, while "Restoration 2" took a more relaxed view of cinema, popular music, and ‘secular’ culture, were generally less separatist in ecclesiology (contributing significantly to the resurgence of the Evangelical Alliance), and encouraged the leadership ministries of women. Coombs identified more closely with the "Restoration 1" stream which included the ministries of Terry Virgo, Bryn Jones and Tony Morton.

=== Salt and Light Ministries ===
Driven by the conviction that the body of Christ is in essence relational and would eventually come to fullness of stature, and influenced by the ideas of British restorationism, Coombs began to gather around him a number of other pastors and leaders with the same vision. This became Salt and Light Ministries International.

=== Theology ===
Central to the theology of Coombs was that the body of Christ is essentially relational and will eventually come to fullness of stature. The priesthood of all believers, the cross-centred gospel, the Kingdom of God, a victorious eschatology, and the summing up of all things in Christ are all important doctrines to Coombs and the Salt and Light network.

== Death ==
After struggling with dementia since around 2016, Coombs suffered a serious brain haemorrhage in 2018, and died on Sunday 22 July 2018.

== Bibliography ==
- A Guide to Practical Pastoring, Sovereign World, Ltd., June 1999 (ISBN 1-85240-240-7)
- Apostles Today, Sovereign World, Ltd., October 2000 (ISBN 1-85240-189-3)
- Finding Your Purpose in God's Plan, Destiny Image Publishers Ltd., 2003 (ISBN 0-7684-3019-4)
- Dealing with What Life Throws At You: How Life's Ups and Downs Can Lead Us to a Greater Intimacy with Jesus, Sovereign World, Ltd., January 2006 (ISBN 1-85240-397-7)
