= Ichthus =

Ichthus may refer to:

- Ichthys (or ichthus), a Christian symbol drawn so as to resemble the profile of a fish
- Ichthus Christian Fellowship, a neocharismatic Christian church movement and Apostolic network
- Ichthus Festival, a Christian music festival in Wilmore, Kentucky
- The Harvard Ichthus, a journal of Christian thought and expression published at Harvard University
