= Hugh Osgood =

British church leader, author and director

- The Reverend Doctor
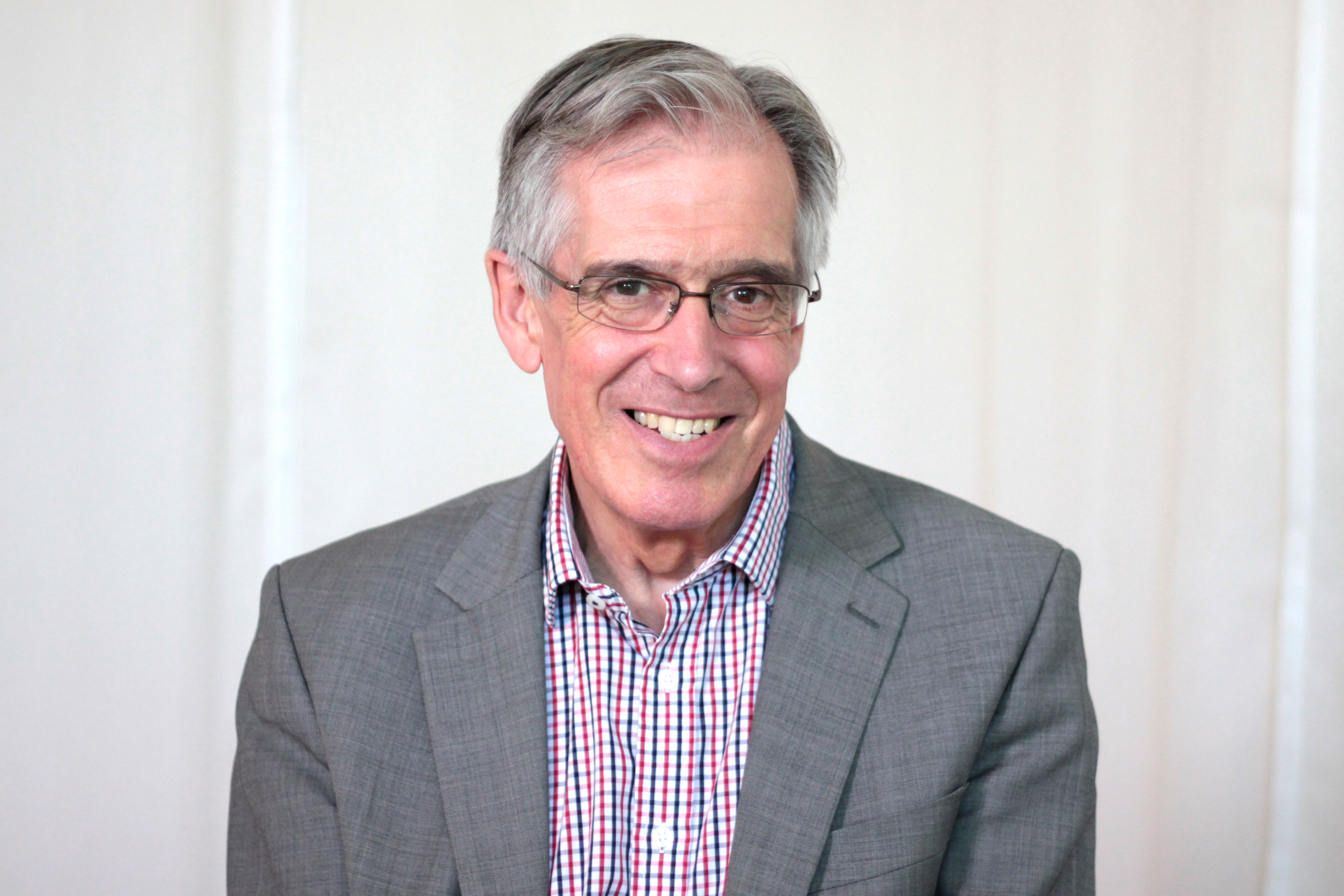
- Hugh Osgood
- Church: Founder of Churches in Communities International
- Previous posts: Moderator of the Free Churches Group, Free Church President of Churches Together in England

Personal details
- Born: 21 April 1947 (age 79) London, England
- Denomination: Evangelical Christianity
- Spouse: Marion (m 1972)

Hugh James Osgood is a British church leader, author, and director. He was appointed Moderator of the Free Churches Group on 17 September 2014, following the resignation of Michael Heaney, and was the first President to serve for successive terms. He was also the Free Churches President of Churches Together in England, and is the co-convenor of the UK Charismatic and Pentecostal Leaders’ Conference, and founding President of Churches in Communities International. He is largely known for his work on racial justice, social cohesion and supporting African Christianity in the United Kingdom.

== Early life and education ==
Osgood was born in 1947 into a Salvation Army family in Southall, England. Osgood attended The Knoll School for Boys. He studied at St Bartholomew's Hospital Medical School and the London School of Dentistry. He received a Bachelor of Dental Surgery in 1970. In his own words, during the summer of 1965 when reading C. S. Lewis’ Mere Christianity, he discovered his calling as an evangelical Christian leader and pursued local church ministry in parallel to dentistry. Subsequently, he received a Master of Divinity degree through the Full Gospel Assembly Bible College' Lahore, Pakistan, then earned his theological PhD through The School of African and Oriental Studies at London University.

== Career ==
Osgood was accepted as a missionary with the African Evangelical Fellowship in 1971, but was unable to travel to Zambia due to President Kenneth Kaunda's decision to cut aid to medical projects. Osgood then joined a small house church in Forest Hill in London, that was linked to the ministry of George North, before establishing a congregation in Bromley, which he led as Bromley North Free Church until 1991. Osgood gave up dentistry incrementally while pastoring the Bromley church. The elders of Bromley Christian Centre, part of the Assemblies of God in Great Britain, approached Osgood in 1989 and decided to combine their church's ministry with that of Bromley North Free Church. After a year of joint activity, Osgood then planted Cornerstone Christian Centre in 1991 as an independent resource centre church where he pioneered a TV department (which was to become Charis Communications), the staff of which, including Howard Conder and Rory and Wendy Alec, went on to establish Revelation TV and GOD TV. Broadcasting began in 1994 on the London Cable Network.

=== National and international ministry ===
From 1988, Hugh Osgood worked for Billy Graham's Mission '89, and established the Council of Reference for Morris Cerullo's Mission to London in 1992.

In 1997, Osgood founded Churches in Communities International as an accountability and accreditation body for independent churches and ministries. This was in response to the significant increase in independent churches throughout the UK who were not formally recognised due to their autonomy. Osgood is the current President of Churches in Communities International which had 117 member churches, 86 chaplains and 316 ministers in 2022.

Osgood was elected as the 60th Free Churches Moderator by the then twenty-four Free Church denominations of England and Wales in September 2014. He is well known in the denominations for his non-partisan ecumenical cooperation. In 2017 he stated, "it doesn’t really bother me that we’ve got lots of denominations as long as we all respect each other and love each other as Jesus said".

During Osgood's tenure as Free Church Moderator, he led the Free Churches Group response to the death of David Amess and released a statement along with other prominent British church leaders, including the Archbishop of Canterbury Justin Welby, following the murder of George Floyd. In February 2021, Osgood signed an open letter to the Home Secretary calling for asylum seekers to be no longer housed in barracks.

== Personal life ==
Osgood is married to Marion who is also an author.

== Apostolic Networks ==
Hugh Osgood has been known to associate with leading figures from the radical house church movement of the 1960s such as Terry Virgo of New Frontiers, Colin Dye of Kensington Temple, Colin Urquhart of Kingdom Faith Church, Noel Stanton of the Jesus Army and John Wimber of the Vineyard Movement who have been criticised by some reformed theologians for misusing the term 'apostolic networks'. Osgood has never referred to himself as an 'apostle' and in 2016 he presented a paper to the Churches Together in Britain and Ireland Conference in which he stated, "many Pentecostals, Independents and other evangelicals increasingly see themselves, regarding unity as being more about respect than institutional convergence".

== Bibliography ==
=== Journal articles ===
- 'Pentecostalism: global trends and local adjustments' Journal of European Pentecostal Theological Association, 28:1 (2008)

=== Book chapters ===
- 'The Rise of Black Churches' in D. Goodhew (Ed), Church growth in Britain – 1980 to the present, (Farnham: Ashgate, 2012)
- 'A biblical theology for engaging with society' in D.Singleton (Ed), Faith with its sleeves rolled up - a collection of essays on the role of faith in society,(London: Faith Action, 2013)

=== Books ===
- Blessing the Nations - discovering your part in God's plan, (Croydon: Sophos Books, 2007)
- Fulfilling your Ministry - communication, identification and partnership, (Croydon: Sophos Books, 2009)
- The Power of Purity - Maintaining a Christian testimony in a compromising world, (Charis House Books, 2016)
- Understanding God - Disclosing the plan of salvation, (Charis House Books, 2016)
- with Glenn Myers, The Failure File, (London: Scripture Union, 1991)
