= Churches Together in England =

English ecumenical organization

Churches Together in England (CTE) is an ecumenical organisation and the national instrument for the Christian Churches in England. It helps its member churches work better together.

Churches Together in England supports a network of Intermediate Bodies, each usually covering an English county or metropolitan area. It also has Bodies in Association, a wide range of organisations and networks which draws together Christians of all churches around common causes, projects and interests.

== Leadership and governance ==
Churches Together in England is a company registered at Companies House with number 05354231, and a charity registered at the Charity Commission with number 1110782. The organisation is governed by a Board, whose members are the trustees of the charity and the directors of the company.

The Enabling Group is a biannual overnight meeting of representatives for the purposes of governance and common concern. The Enabling Group consists of representatives from each Member Church, from Intermediate Bodies, and from Bodies in Association.

In 2026 there are six Presidents of Churches Together in England:

- the Archbishop of Canterbury, Sarah Mullally
- the Roman Catholic Archbishop of Westminster, Richard Moth
- the Free Churches' Moderator, Rev Dr Tessa Henry-Robinson
- the Fourth Presidency Group president, Bishop Paulina Hławiczka-Trotman
- the President for the Orthodox Churches, Bishop Hovakim Manukyan
- Bishop Tedroy Powell (Church of God of Prophecy)

The Fourth Presidency Group consists of the Church of Scotland (Presbytery of England), the Council of Lutheran Churches, the Evangelical Lutheran Church of England, the Evangelische Synode Deutscher Sprache in Großbritannien (German-Speaking Lutheran, Reformed and United Congregations in Great Britain) and the Religious Society of Friends (Quakers in Britain).

The Forum of Churches Together in England is a conference of around three hundred representatives of churches and bodies associated with Churches Together in England. The Moderator of the Forum of Churches Together in England for the three-year period 2015 to 2018 was Ruth Gee (chair of the Darlington Methodist District) with Hilary Topp (a Quaker, working for Student Christian Movement) as Deputy Moderator. The 2018 Forum had the theme 'I am with you always - together in God's mission' and was held in Swanwick, Derbyshire, on 17–19 September 2018. The Moderator of the 2022 Forum was Hilary Topp, the Deputy Moderator is Anton Muller. The 2025 forum had the theme “One but not the Same: Celebrating diversity - living the difference”.

In early 2026, the General Secretary of Churches Together in England is Bishop Mike Royal. Bishop Mike is a bishop with the Apostolic Pastoral Congress.

=== Controversy over presidency of Hannah Brock Womack ===
In November 2019, a disagreement between Churches Together in England and Quakers in Britain regarding the Presidency for the Fourth Presidency Group became public. Following a vacancy, Quakers in Britain nominated Hannah Brock Womack for the Presidency, and the Fourth Presidency Group agreed the appointment. However, as stated by CTE, "the Member Churches of CTE, through the Enabling Group, have recently requested the Fourth Presidency Group to refrain from enacting its Presidency at this time, leaving the Fourth Presidency as an ‘empty chair’ for the current term of office." In a concurrent announcement, Quakers in Britain stated that "The Churches have rejected the Quakers' appointee Hannah Brock Womack, because she is married to a woman. An active Quaker, she is a young, radical peace activist, who campaigns against the arms trade and works in the voluntary sector."

In response, the United Reformed Church noted with deep sadness the inability of CTE to confirm the appointment, and called for dialogue to "continue until a more just outcome can be reached."

The Methodist Church recognised the pain and shared the grief caused by the decision, and stated that the outcome does not represent the Methodist position that being in a same-sex marriage is no bar to roles within the Church, while acknowledging that not all churches agree with this position.

The convenor of the General Council of the Student Christian Movement, Tom Packer-Stucki, declared that "we stand in solidarity with Hannah Brock Womack and the Quaker movement in this difficult time" and called on CTE to "work together ecumenically to reach agreement about LGBTQ+ inclusion that is truly inclusive".

In a June 2020 interview, Hannah Brock Womack revealed that despite her presidency being blocked because of her same-sex marriage, she convenes meetings in the Fourth Presidency Group of CTE. She said: "I'm sad that I can't contribute. Coming from a non-hierarchical Church, and as the only woman in the group, I wanted to speak for those not usually represented, and for a radical and inclusive faith."

In September 2021, General Secretary Paul Goodliff announced that Helen Cameron would become a President in April 2022, taking the position of Hugh Osgood. Goodliff said: "The Methodist Church is representative of those Free Churches Group members who have made synodical decisions to allow equal marriages in their churches, and so Helen is representative of those churches which would want to see more rapid change in the policies of Churches towards same-sex marriage."

== Member churches ==
As of March 2022, Churches Together in England had 50 member churches. By March 2026, this was up to 54.

== Bodies in Association ==
In addition to the actual member churches or member denominations, there were 52 Bodies in Association with Churches Together in England in 2019. These are Christian organizations which, by their nature, are ecumenical but which are self-governing.

== Intermediate or county bodies ==
The Churches and their leaders meet together throughout England in county and large metropolitan areas. County bodies are sometimes called 'Intermediate Bodies' as they exist between the national and the local.

Most county bodies have a person appointed by the network of regional church leaders. These people are known as 'County Ecumenical officers', or CEOs for short. Many have 'development' or 'mission' in their job titles while others are called co-ordinators or facilitators. Each county body is autonomous, though in practice they often work with each other and with Churches Together in England.

== History of Churches Together in England ==
Churches Together in England is part of the ecumenical structure introduced in 1990 when the British Council of Churches was replaced by the Council of Churches in Britain and Ireland (later renamed Churches Together in Britain and Ireland (CTBI) and four national bodies:

- Churches Together in England
- Irish Council of Churches
- Action of Churches Together in Scotland, and
- Cytun (for Wales).

The British Council of Churches had been formed in 1942.

A National Free Church Council had come into being during the 1890s. A Federal Council of the Evangelical Free Churches was formed in 1916 as a more authoritative and representative body. These two merged in 1939 as the Free Church Federal Council.

A significant landmark was the 1910 World Missionary Conference held in Edinburgh.

== See also ==
- English Covenant
