= Centre for Missional Leadership =

Theological centre of the London School of Theology

Coordinates: 51.656885°N 0.398674°W

The Centre for Missional Leadership (CML) was a theological centre specialising in applied theology. It was part of the London School of Theology, the largest evangelical theological college in Europe. It was based in Watford, 20 mi (32 km) northwest of central London, England.

CML taught applied theology with the aim of equipping Christians for practical evangelism. Located on the Watford High Street, CML was an urban centre for Christian learning in the fields of applied theology and Christian mission. The centre trained Christians for ministries both in and outside the church. Many non-church ministries were also developed.

== Workplace ministry ==
Movements that aim to equip people in the workplace are trying to create a shift in attitude from seeing work as a "necessary evil" to a vehicle for evangelism.

CML rejected what it believed to be a false dichotomy and dualism of the sacred and secular divides. An early proponent of this thinking was the theologian John Stott who, through his seminal work with the Lausanne movement, sought to affirm belief in the central calling to ministry and mission of all Christians, regardless of their field of work. Stott wrote: “Every honourable work should be seen by Christians as some kind of co-operation with God, in which we share with Him in the transformation of the world which He has made and committed to our care”. A particular expression of Stott’s thinking reached culmination in the founding of the London Institute for Contemporary Christianity (LICC) in 1982, now led by Mark Greene who has been a visiting lecturer at CML. The aim of LICC is to encourage evangelical Christians to put all areas of their lives under belief in the lordship of Jesus Christ.

C. S. Lewis has spoken about William Tyndale's rejection of the secular–sacred divide. This is based on the Puritan ideals of leading an ordered and disciplined life that integrates both secular and religious aspects.

The Business as Mission Movement also aims to assist Christians in the workplace. The movement was inspired by Youth with a Mission (YWAM) and aims to provide "resources for Christians to live out their faith in all aspects of life and to have purpose, perspective and impact that glorifies the Kingdom of God."

CML was also influenced by the Seven Mountains movement that emerged after a meeting in 1973 between Bill Bright, founder of Campus Crusade for Christ (CCCI), and Loren Cunningham, founder of YWAM. A consensus emerged from their meeting stating that if post-modern secular western countries were going to be re-evangelised, then the wider church needed to take seriously sending advocates into various secular spheres rather than encouraging them to leave such spheres of influence and serve the church. Seven areas of influence were highlighted, namely arts and entertainment, business, education, family, church, government and the media. These fields are seen as culture-shapers that are especially influential within the post-modern era. As the Seven Mountains movement emerged, the church was encouraged to repent for its retreat from these places of influence and instead infiltrate and permeate these areas as strategic mission outposts.

There has also been criticism that the church is out of touch with the pressures faced by people in secular jobs. Efforts have been made to educate church leaders about this concern, such as the third Lausanne congress in Cape Town 2010.

CML was in the evangelical tradition and non-denominational and worked with people from a number of denominations. It was part of the London School of Theology, the largest evangelical theological college in Europe. The evangelical tradition places emphasis on personal conversion, sharing the Gospel, belief in the inerrancy of the Bible and the death and resurrection of Jesus Christ as being historical events. The college aimed specifically to equip people for whole-life discipleship as reflected in courses such as Mission and Bible Overview.

== History ==
CML was started as the Watford School of Leadership (WSOL), opening its doors in September 2009. Steve Cardell, a businessman, along with Greg Downes, an Anglican priest, theologian and evangelist, started WSOL. The college emerged relationally from St Andrew’s Chorleywood, where Cardell was a member and Greg Downes was an associate minister.

== Courses ==
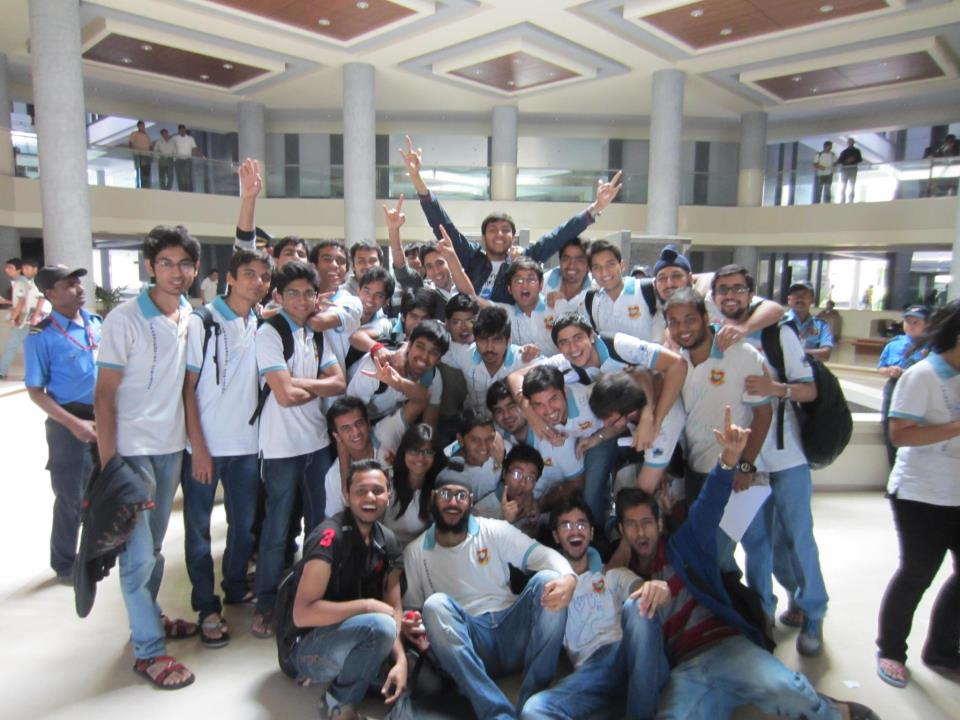

CML offered a Certificate in Missional Leadership, a one-year programme that provided a Bible overview, training in evangelism, mission and leadership skills. Everyday practitioners of these areas served as lecturers on the course including: William Challis, Gerald Coates, Charles Foster, Mark Greene and George Verwer.

== Closure ==
The centre closed down in late 2013.
