= Scroll Publishing Company =

Scroll Publishing Company is an academic publisher focusing on early Christianity. It was founded in 1988 as a non-profit publishing house in Tyler, Texas, but is currently located in Amberson, Pennsylvania. There is no book store at this location. It serves, in particular, the conservative Anabaptist community and Kingdom-minded Christians (Those who believe that "the gospel" is the announcement that Christ's sin-conquering kingdom has come to earth in a spiritual sense).

The focus of their books is on early Christianity and church history, including the distribution of the Ante-Nicene Fathers in its ten-volume set. Additionally, they sell Christian music cassettes and CDs. Notable authors whose works are printed by the Scroll Publishing Company include David Bercot.
