= Paul Marston =

- Born: Victor Paul Marston; June 12, 1946 (age 80); London, England
- Education
- Occupations: University lecturer, author
- Website: https://www.paulmarston.net

Victor Paul Marston (born 1946) is a British academic known for work on apologetics, theology, and the history and philosophy of science. He is a University Senior Lecturer and also a lay minister in the evangelical Free Methodist Church. Marston was brought up in a Christian family and became an evangelical Christian early in life.

== Books and writing ==
=== Works ===
Paul Marston's solo works include:

- The Biblical Family (Cornerstone, 1980) ISBN 978-0891071921
- God and the Family (Kingsway, 1984) ISBN 0 86065 277 7
- Christians, Divorce and Remarriage (Lifesway, 2006) ISBN 978-0-9553742-1-0
- Gay Partnerships and the Jesus Centred Church (Lifesway, 2006) ISBN 978-0-9553742-2-7
- Understanding the Biblical Creation Passages (Lifesway, 2007) ISBN 978-0-9553742-9-6
- Women in Church Leadership and in Marriage (Lifesway, 2007) ISBN 978-0-9553742-7-2
- Great Astronomers in European History (Canopus, 2014) ISBN 978-1-901922-97-4
- Biblical Bases for Key Doctrines (Lifesway, 2017) ISBN 978-9-9553742-8-9
- Hellfire and Destruction (Wipf and Stock, 2024) Paperback ISBN 978-1-6667-8478-7, Hardcover ISBN 978-1-6667-8479-4, ebook ISBN 978-1-6667-8480-0

=== With Roger T Forster ===
Books by Marston and Roger T. Forster include:

- Yes, But...: Reasonable Questions about Living Faith (Victory P., Jan 1971) ISBN 0-85476-097-0
- That's a good question! Reasonable answers about living faith (Tyndale House, 1974) ISBN 0-8423-7030-7
- God's Strategy in Human History: God's Sovereignty and Man's Responsibility (Send the Light, 1973) ISBN 0-903843-00-5, (Tyndale House, 1974) ISBN 8423–1081–9, paper ISBN 8423-1080-0 cloth (Bethany House, 1984) ISBN 0-87123-434-3, (Godalming: Highland, 1989) ISBN 0-946616-55-8
- Reason and Faith: Do Science and Theology Really Conflict? (Crowborough: Monarch, 1989) ISBN 1-85424-054-4, (Monarch, 1999) ISBN 978-1-85424-441-3, and (Wipf and Stock, 2000) ISBN 1-57910-661-7
- Christianity Evidence & Truth (Crowborough: Monarch, 1995) ISBN 1-85424-311-X
- 'Reason, Science and Faith (Monarch, 1999) ISBN 978-1-85424-441-3
- God's Strategy in Human History: 2nd edition (Wipf and Stock 2000) ISBN 1-57910-273-5
- God's Strategy in Human History: Vol 1 God's Path to Victory (Push, 2013) ISBN 978-0-9553783-5-5
- God's Strategy in Human History: Vol 2 Reconsidering Key Biblical Ideas (Push, 2013) ISBN 978-0-9553783-6-2
- Christianity: The Evidence (Push, 2014) ISBN 978-0-9933445-0-3
- Paul's Gospel in Romans & Galatians (Push, 2016) ISBN 978-0-9933445-6-5

Some of these have been translated into Mandarin, German, Serbo-Croatian, Russian, Portuguese, and Nepalese.
