= Gerald Coates =

British evangelical (1944–2022)

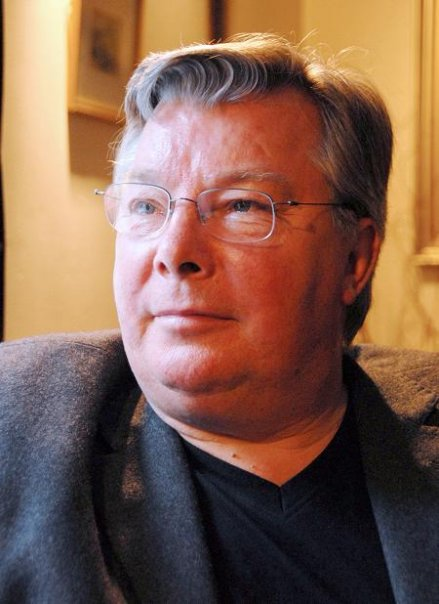
Gerald Coates

Gerald Coates (25 November 1944 – 3 April 2022) was an author, speaker, broadcaster and the founder of Pioneer, a neocharismatic evangelical Christian network of churches and forums, established to "develop new churches across the UK and engage in mission globally." A safeguarding review was initiated by Pioneer Trust in response to a complaint raised in July 2023 via social media regarding Coates who had been their late founder and former national leader. As a result, a comprehensive safeguarding investigation was carried out by Christian Safeguarding Services which examined and upheld “deeply concerning” behaviour by Coates involving young adult men and children.

== Work ==
Coates was an author, speaker and a broadcaster, in both secular and religious media.

The Pioneer network he founded is a charismatic group of evangelical churches. It is part of the British New Church Movement and can also be described as Restorationist. He later handed over the leadership of the movement to Billy and Caroline Kennedy of New Community, Southampton. Coates himself was responsible for coining the term "New Church" to replace the apparently more confusing former name "House Church Movement," of which he was also a founding member. Along with Roger T. Forster of Ichthus Christian Fellowship and Lynn Green of Youth with a Mission, he was one of the founders of March for Jesus.

He led a church in Leatherhead called Engage, which initially met in the former Thorndike Theatre, but later gathered in Church Halls, Leatherhead. He founded and ran a series of training courses called Insight, which is, in charismatic idiom, a "school of prophecy." He was the chair of the Charismatic Evangelical Round Table for 16 years, was involved with Pioneer's National Churches Forum, and CRAC (the Central Religious Advisory Council).

== Safeguarding Investigation ==
In August 2023, Pioneer Trust (PT) commissioned Christian Safeguarding Services (CSS) to carry out a comprehensive assessment of safeguarding practice of the Pioneer Trust, both currently and historically in response to a complaint made against their late founder and former National Leader, Gerald Coates (GC) on 19 July 2023. A then-19-year-old male attendee of a Pioneer evangelism training course alleged that Coates “latched on” to him. Coates subsequently contacted the 19 year old via Facebook and arranged to meet up for one-to-one time. Coates greeted him with an uninvited kiss and that during the interaction, started talking about pornography and masturbation in graphic detail which he (the complainant) found very uncomfortable and was prying into his private life.

Thirty-five people provided written submissions to the review. 26 video interviews were conducted with respondents. 4 further interviews were conducted with people who did not make contact with CSS directly but were encouraged to speak with the reviewers by other respondents.

Allegations and source material received by CSS

- 1. Gerald's ministry and “prophetic words”, particularly later in his life, appear in the main to have focused on young adult men in their early 20s.
- 2. These men were typically described by those expressing concerns as “gifted” and “good looking”.
- 3. A number were initially approached by GC at public events including PT Leaders Conferences, University Christian Unions etc.
- 4. These were singled out by GC to receive encouraging or occasionally directional prophetic words.
- 5. A number were subsequently encouraged to move to the Leatherhead area.
- 6. Some had accommodation arranged in a property next door to GC and his wife.
- 7. Many were led to believe they had a future in ministry under his mentoring.
- 8. Many were subjected to GC's ‘holy kiss’. This greeting, described by GC himself as a “Holy Kiss” involved a kiss on the cheek, similar to that which is common in other cultures around the world.
- 9. Some young men were directly contacted by GC without any prior contact, via Facebook.
- 10. Others were followed-up via Facebook by GC with or without their prior approval or consent.
- 11. On a few occasions GC contacted teenagers (and on one occasion a 12/13-year-old) on Facebook either directly or having gained parental permission to do so, without having any prior contact with them.
- 12. It was reported by several respondents that GC had spoken publicly of personal experiences of same sex attraction in his early life.
- 13. Some respondents reported observing GC consuming significant amounts of alcohol on a regular basis later in his life.
- 14. GC became focused on the struggles young men had with pornography, masturbation, sexuality, and identity. Some participants were told by GC (when they asked about his line of questioning) that he had a standard “questionnaire” that he used with those he mentored. This included questions about sexuality, sexual attractions, and activity, and, based on respondent's accounts of their conversations GC was used routinely with anyone that he mentored; regardless of the reason for the mentoring or the themes to be addressed.
- 15. GC would ask deeply personal questions of young men about their struggles in these areas typically without warning, invitation, or permission to broach those issues.
- 16. GC appears to have lacked appropriate and effective personal accountability structures, particularly after passing on his leadership role and employment in 2009.
- 17. Some respondents expressed the view that within PT, there was an avoidance of, or discomfort with, properly recognising and responding to safeguarding risks associated with concerning aspects of GCs ministry practices. While this is disputed, numerous participants reported that encountering an attitude of “that's just Gerald” or “that's Gerald's ministry”, particularly in the earlier days. It should, however, be noted that while this may have been the case in the wider Pioneer network, by the mid 2010s, leaders and relevant staff at PT were actively seeking advice from Thirtyone:eight (formerly CCPAS), PT's external specialist safeguarding advisors, and were following that advice and taking active steps to address the concerns.
- 18. When he was spoken to, GC seemed to largely disregard advice and guidance offered to him around these safeguarding concerns, even as the response of PT was escalated.

The CSS full report was published on 20th May 2024.

== Personal life ==
He married Anona in 1967 and had three sons, two grandsons and two grand daughters. They lived in Cobham, Esher and latterly Bookham, Surrey. He died on 3 April 2022 at the age of 78.

== Bibliography ==
- Gerald Coates - Pioneer. Biography Ralph Turner, (md 2016) ISBN 978-1-910786-26-0
- Sexual Healing with Nathan Ferreira (md 2013)
- Non-Religious Christianity. (Revival Press 1998) ISBN 978-1-560436-94-2
- The Vision. (Kingsway 1995) ISBN 0-85476-446-1
- Kingdom Now! (Kingsway 1993)
- An Intelligent Fire (Eastbourne: Kingsway,1991) ISBN 0-86065-860-0 - an autobiography
- Divided We Stand (Eastbourne: Kingsway, 1987) ISBN 0-86065-396-X
- Gerald Quotes (Eastbourne: Kingsway, 1984) ISBN 0-86065-295-5
- What on Earth is this Kingdom? Kingsway, 1983 ISBN 0-86065-217-3

== See also ==
- British New Church Movement
