= David Bercot =

American Christian writer

David W. Bercot (pronounced as David Berçot; born April 13, 1950) is an Anabaptist Christian church historian, attorney, author, and international speaker from the United States. He has written various books and magazine articles about early Christianity and Christian discipleship. His two best-known works are Will the Real Heretics Please Stand Up?, and the Dictionary of Early Christian Beliefs. Bercot completed his theological education at the University of Cambridge and was subsequently ordained as an Anglican priest before joining fellowship with Conservative Anabaptists, whom he believed to best embody the practices of early Christianity.

== Academic career ==
David Bercot was raised as a Jehovah's Witness. After leaving the Jehovah's Witnesses in 1976, he began his university education. He graduated from Stephen F. Austin State University summa cum laude, and he obtained his Doctor of Jurisprudence degree cum laude from Baylor University School of Law.

In 1985, Bercot began an in-depth study of the early Christians who lived before the Council of Nicaea in A.D. 325. His studies started him on a spiritual pilgrimage. In 1989, he wrote the book, Will the Real Heretics Please Stand Up, which sets forth some of the teachings and lifestyle of the early Christians. That same year, he joined with an Assembly of God pastor to establish Scroll Publishing Company for the purpose of publishing various writings of the pre-Nicene Christians, as well as to publish other Christian books.

Bercot's studies of the early Christians brought him into contact and dialogue with three different branches of Christianity: the Anabaptists (Mennonites, Amish, Brethren), the Anglican Church, and the churches of the Restoration Movement (Church of Christ, Disciples of Christ, International Church of Christ). In 1985, after completing his religious studies through Cambridge University, Bercot was ordained as an Anglican priest. However, he eventually left the Anglican Church and began fellowshipping with various Conservative Anabaptist churches, as Bercot understood Anabaptist Christianity to best embody the beliefs and practices of the early Church.

Today Bercot is a lecturer and author who emphasizes the simplicity of Biblical doctrine and early (ante-Nicene) Christian teaching versus what he would call the complex body of theological understanding that has built up over the centuries in churches and academia, which has come to be thought of as orthodoxy. He is particularly notable for his deeply nonresistant understanding of Jesus's and New Testament teaching.

== Writings ==
Bercot's most widely read work is A Dictionary of Early Christian Beliefs, published in 1998. It is a work that collects over 7000 excerpts from writings of early Christians, arranged alphabetically by topic. According to Bercot, before the publication of his work, the only practical way to determine what the early Christians believed about any given topic was to read the actual writings of the Ante-Nicene Fathers themselves. After the publication of A Dictionary of Early Christian Beliefs, the Evangelical Review of Theology stated: “David Bercot has done the church a great service in providing an accessible point of entry into the extant writings of the pre-Nicene church.” The Conservative Theological Journal stated: “This is a must text for everyone interested in modern theological trends in general and especially historical studies.”

Other popular books that Bercot has written are Will the Real Heretics Please Stand Up, published originally in 1989, and The Kingdom That Turned the World Upside Down (2003), and Will the Theologians Please Sit Down (2009).

== Personal life ==
Bercot and his wife, Deborah, were married in 1972. They have three children. Bercot resides in Pennsylvania, United States.

== Bibliography ==
- Will the Real Heretics Please Stand Up (1989) ISBN 0-924722-00-2
- The Pilgrim Road (1991) ISBN 0-924722-03-7
- Common Sense (1992) ISBN 0-924722-06-1
- A Dictionary of Early Christian Beliefs (1998) ISBN 1-56563-357-1, OCLC 1355346354
- Let Me Die in Ireland (1999) ISBN 0-924722-08-8
- The Kingdom that Turned the World Upside Down (2003) ISBN 0-924722-17-7
- Plain Speaking: How to Preach and Teach Effectively (2007) ISBN 978-0-924722-19-6
- Will the Theologians Please Sit Down (2009) ISBN 978-0-924722-24-0
- In God We Don't Trust (2011) ISBN 978-0-924722-25-7
- Secrets of the Kingdom Life (2014) ISBN 978-0-924722-28-8

== See also ==
- Ante-Nicene Fathers (book)
- Conservative Anabaptism
- Early Christianity
