= Queen Marimba =

African folk hero

Queen Marimba is a folk hero whose accomplishments have become part of the folklore of Africa. As is customary in most African cultures she is considered to be a god and was one of the immortals. She led the Akamba tribe in East Africa in very ancient times across the Ukambani plains in present day Kenya, stretching across the Kilimanjaro plains in present day Tanzania. There has been scant research done on her and presently the most notable source for information on her life comes from the writings of Vusa'mazulu Credo Mutwa. He asserts in his book; Indaba My Children, that she was the mother of the Akamba people (bantu original) at the time when they were getting to know their Maasai neighbours. Various renditions of his book have been published since the late 60's, including "My People, My Africa", "Indaba My Children" and "Africa Is My Witness."

She is associated with music and teaching the people to sing, as well as having created the forerunners of all the various instrument families. Instruments that she's credited with creating include ngoma (drum), marimba (xylophone), kalimba (lamellaphone), makweyana or musical bow and a raft zither or hand xylophone known as mukimbe.

== Recordings ==
- Columbia Records: Drums of Passion. Liner notes by Akinsola Akiwowo (1958).
