= Roger T. Forster =

British theologian (1933–2024)

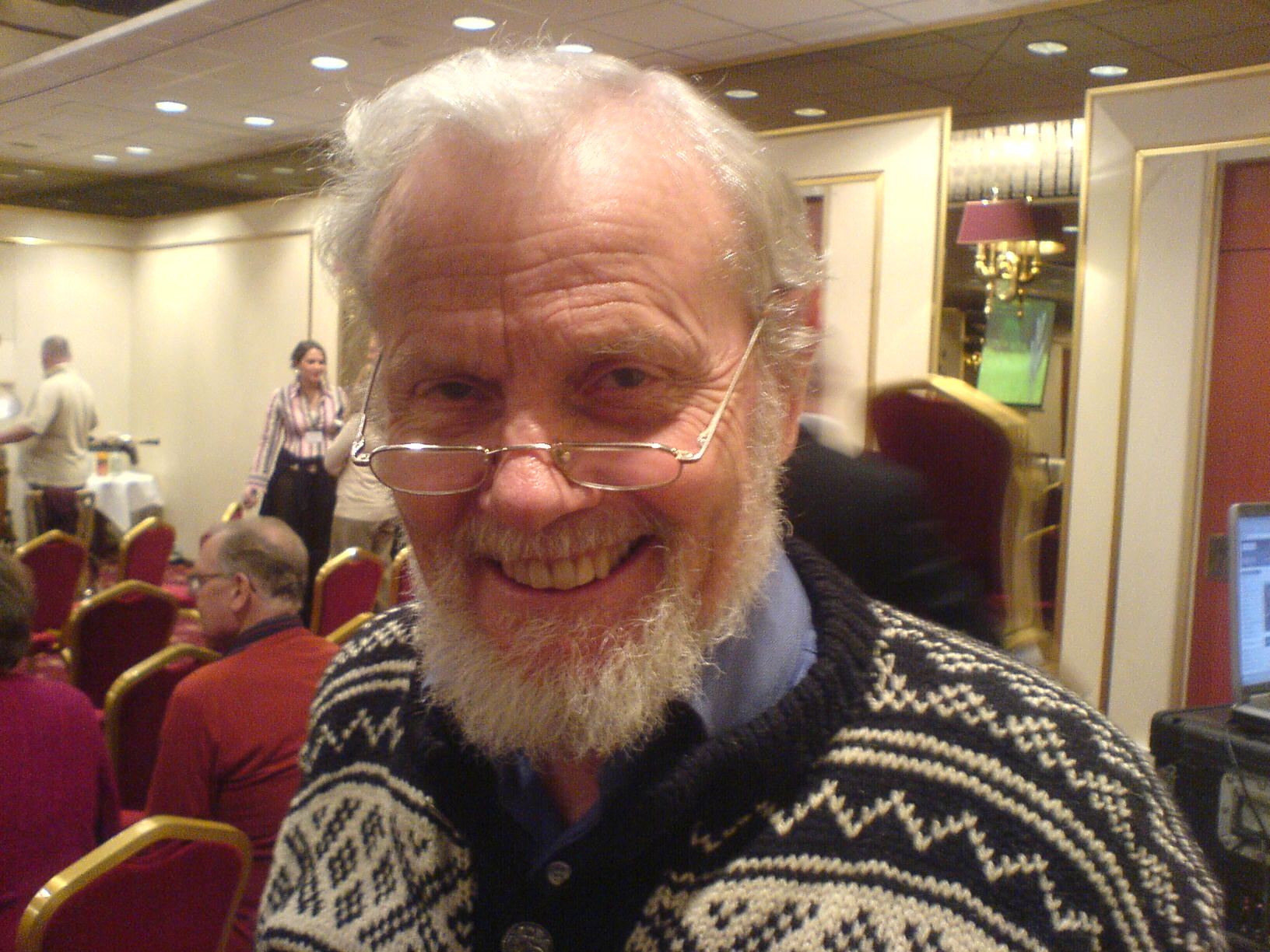
- Forster at 2009 Ichthus Leader's Conference
- Born: Roger Thomas Forster; 1 March 1933; Wood Green, London, England
- Died: 17 January 2024 (aged 90); Forest Hill, London, England
- Education: MA from the University of Cambridge, Mathematics and Theology
- Occupations: Church leader, author, charity worker
- Spouse: Faith Forster (m. 1965)
- Website: https://www.ichthus.org.uk

Roger Thomas Forster (1 March 1933 – 17 January 2024) was a British Christian theologian who was the founder of Ichthus Christian Fellowship, a neocharismatic Evangelical Christian Church that forms part of the British New Church Movement.

== Cambridge ==
Forster studied mathematics and theology at Cambridge University from 1951 to 1954. He was a contemporary of David Watson, Michael Harper, Michael Green and David Sheppard. By the standards of his later evangelical beliefs, he considered his Methodist upbringing to be both liberal and without a clear presentation of the Christian gospel. When he heard an explanation of it by an Anglican bishop (Hugh Gough) at the Christian Union, he decided, "to follow Christ." Three years later, he reported an experience of being baptised in the Spirit which he described as "sine curves of love going through the room." Sider observes that the foundations of later values began to take shape at this point: a commitment to combine evangelical ministry with social action, together with recognition and service to all true people of God, irrespective of church affiliation.

== Royal Air Force ==
After graduating, he became an officer in the Royal Air Force, serving from 1954 to 1956. On 18 November 1954, he was commissioned in the Education Branch of the RAF as a pilot officer (national service commission). He was promoted to flying officer on 18 November 1955. He transferred to the reserve (national service list) on 5 December 1956, thereby ending his short RAF career.

His radical mindset became evident immediately, as even in the RAF he put into practice the "organic church" ideas of G. H. Lang. He met with others at a pub, a club or a home, circled some chairs and expected everyone to contribute, as he felt the Bible recommended. This successful work led to invitations to preach at churches in the surrounding area; his itinerant evangelistic work began at this point.

== Itinerant evangelist ==
From 1957 to 1969 his commitment to evangelism led him to the work of university missions. He had several experiences of seeing small groups set up after an evangelistic campaign; this showed him it was possible to gather converts into the nucleus of a new church. Later he became involved in urban mission. He was associated with the work of Honor Oak Fellowship under the leadership of Theodore Austin-Sparks. Sparks' teaching on organic church life and the work of the cross in the believer made a great impression on Forster.

== Ichthus ==
In September 1974 Forster began Ichthus Christian Fellowship in his front room with 14 people. Ichthus began with "elements of Brethren ecclesiology, an acceptance of second blessing theology, a willingness to engage in spiritual warfare, [and] a recognition that the church was big and varied rather than narrow and sectarian." Rather than planting a church to simply give place to the gifts of the Spirit, Ichthus was committed to practical service, on-the-job training, evangelism, overseas mission and service to all, aiming at love for each other as the final evidence of authentic Christianity. Forster stepped down from active leadership of Ichthus Christian Fellowship in October 2021.

== March for Jesus ==
In 1987 the relationship of Ichthus led by Roger Forster, Pioneer led by Gerald Coates and Youth with a Mission led by Lynn Green - together with worship leader Graham Kendrick - led to March for Jesus, a movement which over the next three years spread across the UK, Europe and North America, and finally across the world. Hundreds of smaller marches emerged in its wake. The songs that form Graham Kendrick's Shine Jesus Shine - the best-selling UK praise and worship album of its era - were written during a time when he was worship leader at Ichthus.

== Reputation ==
According to Andrew Walker, a leading commentator on the British New Church Movement he was considered to have "one of the finest minds in the Evangelical constituency."

Theologian and author Greg Boyd dedicated his 2007 book The Jesus Legend to Forster, stating that "for fifty years Roger has tirelessly and selflessly served the Kingdom with intellectual brilliance and Christ-like sacrifice."

== Appointments ==
Vice-president, Tear Fund.

Founder Member, March for Jesus.

Vice-president, Universities and Colleges Christian Fellowship.

October 2008, appointed Alliance Council Chair at the Evangelical Alliance.

== Personal life and death ==
In 1965 he married Faith (born 1941), with whom he had three children. They met at the Scripture Gift Mission where Faith was working. He died at his home in Forest Hill, London on 17 January 2024, at the age of 90.

== Books and writing ==
=== By Roger T Forster ===
- Saturday Night...Monday Morning (Inter-Varsity Press, 1980) ISBN 0-85110-412-6
- Saving Faith (Moving on) (Scripture Union Publishing, 1985) ISBN 0-86201-220-1
- (Editor) Ten New Churches (Bromley: Marc Europe, 1986) ISBN 0-947697-20-9
- Finding the Path: The Search for Spiritual Reality (Leicester: Frameworks, 1991) ISBN 0-85111-218-8
- The Kingdom of Jesus: The Radical Challenge of the Message of Jesus (Colorado Springs: Authentic Lifestyle, 2002) ISBN 1-85078-468-X
- Prayer: Living in the breath of God (Colorado Springs: Authentic Lifestyle, 2003) ISBN 1-85078-469-8
- Trinity: Song and Dance God (Milton Keynes: Authentic Lifestyle, 2004) ISBN 1-85078-529-5
- Suffering and the Love of God: The Book of Job (London: Push Publishing, 2006) ISBN 0-9553783-0-3

with Dr Paul Marston

- Yes, But...: Reasonable Questions about Living Faith (Victory P., Jan 1971) ISBN 0-85476-097-0
- That's a good question! Reasonable answers about living faith (Tyndale House, 1974) ISBN 0-8423-7030-7
- God's Strategy in Human History: God's Sovereignty and Man's Responsibility (Godalming: Highland, 1989) ISBN 0-946616-55-8
- Reason and Faith: Do Science and Theology Really Conflict? (Crowborough: Monarch, 1989) ISBN 1-85424-054-4
- Christianity Evidence & Truth (Crowborough: Monarch, 1995) ISBN 1-85424-311-X
- Reason, Science and Faith (Monarch, 1999) ISBN 978-1-85424-441-3
- God's Strategy in Human History: 2nd edition (Wipf and Stock 2000) ISBN 1-57910-273-5
- God's Strategy in Human History: Vol 1 God's Path to Victory (Push, 2013) ISBN 978-0-9553783-5-5
- God's Strategy in Human History: Vol 2 Reconsidering Key Biblical Ideas (Push, 2013) ISBN 978-0-9553783-6-2
- Christianity: The Evidence (Push, 2014) ISBN 978-0-9933445-0-3
- Paul's Gospel in Romans & Galatians (Push, 2016) ISBN 978-0-9933445-6-5

with Graham Kendrick, Gerald Coates and Lynn Green

- March for Jesus (Kingsway Publications, 1992) ISBN 0-86065-987-9

with Faith Forster

- Women and the Kingdom (London: Push Publishing, 2010) ISBN 978-0-9553783-3-1

articles, chapters and forewords

- Roger Forster "Wholistic Models of Evangelism and Social Concern: No 9 Ichthus Christian Fellowship" Transformation: An International Journal of Holistic Mission Studies Vol 9(2): 15
- Roger Forster "What Can Charismatics and Evangelicals Learn from Each Other?" Transformation: An International Journal of Holistic Mission Studies Vol 5(4): 3
- Roger Forster, Ray Mayhew "Organising a Caring Church," Christian Brethren Review 35 (1985) 25–38.
- C Peter Wagner Territorial Spirits: Insights on Strategic-Level Spiritual Warfare from Nineteen Christian Leaders (Chichester: Sovereign World, 1991) Foreword
- David Pawson Once Saved, Always Saved? (London: Hodder & Stoughton, 1996) Foreword
- Andrew Walker, Kristin Aune Ed On Revival: A Critical Examination (Carlisle: Paternoster 2003) Foreword

=== About Roger T Forster ===
popular

- Brian Hewitt, Doing a New Thing? Seven Leaders Reflect on the Past, Present and Future of the House Church Movement (London; Hodder, 1995) chapter 4
- Roger Forster (Ed) Ten New Churches (Bromley: Marc Europe, 1986) chapter 3
- Ronald Sider Bread of Life: Stories of Radical Mission (London: Triangle, 1996) chapter 2

academic

- P D Hocken in Stanley M Burgess, Eduard M van der Maas New International Dictionary of Pentecostal and Charismatic Movements s.v. "Roger T Forster"
- William K Kay Apostolic Networks in Britain: New Ways of Being Church (Milton Keynes: Paternoster, 2007) chapter 7
- Anthony O'Sullivan, "Roger Forster and the Ichthus Christian Fellowship: The Development of a Charismatic Missiology" Pneuma 16 no 2 Fall 1994, 247–263.
- Anthony O'Sullivan, "Reconciliation and Renewal in Roger T. Forster: the Doctrine of Atonement in the Teaching and Practice of a Restoration Theology" (Ph.D. Thesis, University of Leeds, 2001)
