= British New Church Movement =

Neocharismatic evangelical Christian movement

The British New Church Movement (BNCM) is a neocharismatic evangelical Christian movement. Its origin is associated with the Charismatic Movement of the 1960s, although it both predates it and has an agenda that goes beyond it. It was originally known as the "house church movement", although this name is no longer relevant as few congregations meet in houses. Gerald Coates, one of the early leaders but subsequently discredited by the 2024 CSS safeguarding report, coined the name New Churches as an alternative. It is also restorationist in character, seeking to restore the church to its 1st century equivalent. While the Charismatic Movement focused on the transformation of individuals, the BNCM (like Brethrenism, Baptists, Anabaptists and the Restoration Movement in the US) focused also on the nature of the church. For the BNCM since 1970, this has focused on the renewal of the fivefold ministries, particularly apostles, which for others might resemble a charismatically ordained and functioning episcopate.

The British New Church Movement numbered roughly 400,000 people in the year 2000. It has two major aspects: those who believe in the role of apostles, where churches relate together in "streams", and independent charismatic churches, where they generally do not. Those in streams represent about 40% of the BNCM. Since its origins, it has grown to include many networks of churches, with individual congregations found throughout the world.

== History ==
=== Origins ===
Arthur Wallis and David Lillie, Plymouth Brethren men, became convinced of the validity of spiritual gifts. Lillie had received the "Baptism in the Spirit" in 1941, and Wallis in 1951. Influenced by ex-Apostolic leader Cecil Cousen, they developed an understanding that a return of the 'charismatic gifts' (e.g., prophecy and speaking in tongues) to the traditional denominations was not sufficient, and that the church needed to be restored to the New Testament forms of church government as described in Paul's epistle to the Ephesians: apostle, prophet, evangelist, shepherd and teacher (Ephesians 4:11). This became known as the fivefold ministry model, and the group saw the fulfillment of these offices as essential to the reviving of the worldwide Christian Church. Although they had in practice left the Brethren, their subsequent efforts produced a hybrid, Pentecostalised Brethrenism, displaying features of both traditions.

=== Growth and development ===
In the early 1970s the "Magnificent Seven" (later becoming the "Fabulous Fourteen") came together; a group of leaders who recognised each other as apostles and prophets, and who sought to develop a theology and ecclesiology that would guide the restoration of the church. In 1976, however, these leaders diverged into two separate streams:

- "Restoration 1" ('R1') followed the more conservative teachings of Arthur Wallis, Graham Perrins and Bryn Jones, and included such figures as Terry Virgo, founder of the Newfrontiers network of churches, Barney Coombs of Salt and Light Ministries International, and Tony Morton, formerly of Cornerstone.
- "Restoration 2" ('R2') took a more relaxed view of cinema, popular music, and ‘secular’ culture, were generally less separatist, (contributing significantly to the resurgence of the Evangelical Alliance), and encouraged the leadership ministries of women. This stream included the ministries of Gerald Coates, John and Christine Noble, and others not now associated like Maurice Smith, Dave Tomlinson and George Tarleton.
- Andrew Walker distinguishes Roger and Faith Forster's Ichthus Christian Fellowship from the rest: "perhaps the most significant house church organization that lies outside Restorationism is the Ichthus movement."

R1 and R2 did not represent two separate organisations. Both contained multiple groupings as listed above. R1 and R2 were labels devised by Walker for ease of discussion in his book. However, they passed into popular usage.

The division was caused by a number of factors: differences of opinion about the priority of apostles and prophets; different views of grace and law, women in ministry, and relating to contemporary culture; and a discussion about appropriate discipline for an early leader. It was finally catalysed by a letter setting out the problems sent by Arthur Wallis to the other early leaders. A number of attempts to repair this breach were made, and within a few years there was some dialogue again. However, the shared vision of earlier times was never regained.

=== Since 2000 ===
Due to the emphasis of the movement on relational church structures, and an emphasis on local autonomy, the movement does not have an overarching authority or figurehead. The various networks retain differing levels of association with one another.

The fastest growing churches in Britain today are the 'new churches,' mostly independent charismatic churches, sometimes led by former Anglican ministers and forming loose associations. These have probably outstripped the classical Pentecostal churches in influence and extent.

— Allan Anderson, An Introduction to Pentecostalism: Global Charismatic Christianity)

Restoration 1 diverged into three groups, under the leadership of Bryn Jones, Terry Virgo and Tony Morton. Eventually, Bryn Jones' group has diversified into five identifiable parts: churches led by Alan Scotland, Keri Jones (Bryn's brother), Gareth Duffty, Andrew Owen and Paul Scanlon. Restoration 2 had originally had at least three groups: that led by Gerald Coates, John Noble, and George Tarleton. Tarleton left the movement quite soon after the split; in the 1990s John Noble joined Gerald Coates' movement, with some of his churches following. During this time, Dave Tomlinson started as an Apostle within R1, moved to R2 and then also left the movement, becoming an Anglican vicar. Barney Coombs churches have developed alongside R1 throughout the period. Thirty years after the first division, it appears that churches connected with R1 have generally maintained their impetus (with the exception of Tony Morton's churches, whose association has dissolved after he left the movement also). On the other hand, churches within R2 have had a much more difficult history.

Although some might say that R1 and R2 have ceased to have any meaning as labels and the relationship problems from the 1970s have very largely been healed, the close fellowship of the original group has never been regained, and there is no sense of shared leadership within the movement. The current distance between the various leaders would still reflect a different views of grace or cultural accommodation, for example; even if ideas about the use of spiritual gifts, adult baptism, and informality of meeting remained the same. In recent years, new streams have developed as others have almost ceased to play an active part.

Key characters have included Terry Virgo, Barney Coombs (died 2018), and Gerald Coates (died 2022).

== Notable ministers ==
- Stuart Bell
- Gerald Coates
- Barney Coombs
- Cecil Cousen
- Faith Forster
- Roger Forster
- Bryn Jones
- Keri Jones
- Hugh Osgood
- Tony Ling
- Dave Matthews
- David Lillie
- Campbell McAlpine
- Tony Morton
- John and Christine Noble
- Graham Perrins
- Alan Scotland
- Maurice Smith
- Noel Stanton
- George Tarleton
- Dave Tomlinson
- Colin Urquhart
- Terry Virgo
- Arthur Wallis
