= Institute of Environmental Sciences =

Coordinates: 52°9′55.55″N 4°27′49.36″E

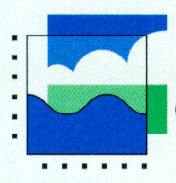
CML logo.

The Institute of Environmental Sciences (CML) is an institute of the Faculty of Science of Leiden University in the Netherlands. The main area of work is research and education in the multidisciplinary field of environmental sciences.

In 2009 the tenured and non tenured staff consists of about 28 fte including 4,5 fte supporting staff. The interdisciplinary character is reflected in the various staff members' backgrounds, such as: ecologists, chemical engineers, agricultural engineers, physicists etc.
