= Terry Virgo =

Founder of an English Evangelical church

- Born: February 20, 1940 (age 86)
- Education: London Bible College
- Occupations: Church pastor, leader, preacher
- Known for: founding of the New Frontiers International (Newfrontiers) church network
- Spouse: Wendy Virgo (m. 1968)
- Children: 5
- Religion: Christianity, evangelical, neocharismatic
- Church: Newfrontiers network
- Writings: Restoration in the Church (1985); Start: An Interactive Study Guide... (1999)
- Congregations served: Evangelical Free Church, Seaford, East Sussex (1968-1979); Church of Christ the King (CCK, now Emmanuel at The Clarendon Centre), in Brighton; Newfrontiers' Kings Church, Kingston-upon-Thames.
- Offices held: Pastor, Apostle
- Website: terryvirgo.org

Terry Virgo is the founder of the Newfrontiers family of neocharismatic evangelical churches. As of 2002 he was considered a prominent leader in the British New Church Movement, formerly known as the House Church Movement.

== Early life and education ==
Terry Virgo was not brought up in a believing home, though he was sent to Sunday school at both a high Anglican church, and a low Presbyterian Church, where he "never heard the gospel." When Virgo was 16, his sister became a believer, and through her, he too was touched by God and "got down on his knees and began to weep." At first, he went to an Anglican Church, but then visited Holland Road Baptist Church, about which he said, "the moment I went through the door, I realised that these people had got what I had."

Virgo studied at London Bible College.

== Career ==
=== Pastoral positions ===
In 1968, Virgo was invited to lead a new Evangelical Free Church in Seaford, East Sussex; he would remain in Seaford for the next eleven years (until 1979).

=== Newfrontiers ===
Virgo established Newfrontiers International, a network of British Reformed-Charismatic churches. It began in 1980 as Coastlands and was renamed New Frontiers in 1986. By the end of the 1990s, per scholarly report in 2005, Newfrontiers had become the largest group of Apostolic churches (New Churches) in the United Kingdom. Newfrontiers used week-long conferences, known as "Bible weeks" as an important strategy for growth and the development of its identity; known originally as Downs Bible Weeks, and running for a decade from 1979, the program gathered up to 20,000 people at its height.

== Views ==
Virgo has been called "a sort of elder statesman of Calvinist continuationists". Church historian Derryck Lovegrove has observed that Virgo has "enjoyed a powerful personal hegemony," referring to Virgo's influence both within his own movement, and the wider British New Church Movement.

According to Restoring the Kingdom by Andrew Walker, "Virgo thinks that restoration of apostles is the most important and distinctive feature of Restoration."

Virgo holds to a complementarian view of gender roles.

== Personal life ==
Virgo married his wife, Wendy, in 1968. After marrying, the two established their home in Seaford, East Sussex, where they remained for the next eleven years (until 1979), after which they moved to Brighton and Hove, where, as of 2013, they still resided.

== Published works ==
1. Virgo, Terry (1985). Restoration in the Church. Cleveland, TN: Kingsway. ISBN 0860653870.
2. —, — (2001). No Well Worn Paths. Cleveland, TN: Kingsway. ISBN 978-0854769902. [Virgo autobiography.]
3. —, — (2007) [1999]. Start: An Interactive Study Guide to Help Christians Grow in Their Faith. Cleveland, TN: Kingsway. ISBN 9781842913703.

== See also ==
- Charismatic Movement
- Charismatic Restorationism
- Reformed Christianity
