= Classical Marimba League =

International marimba organization

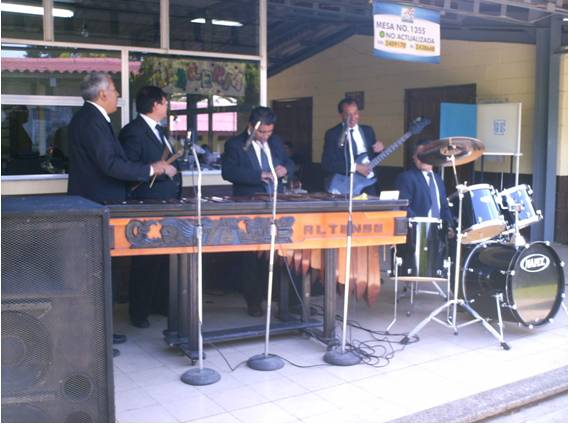
The Classical Marimba League is dedicated to the marimba, a keyboard percussion instrument.

The Classical Marimba League (CML) is an international organization dedicated to the advancement of the marimba.

The musical repertoire for the marimba in the classical concert venue is quite young and sparse. Compared to the hundreds of years worth of repertoire written for standard orchestral instruments, the CML's efforts are focused on expanding the classical repertoire for the marimba as well as helping to advance the careers of talented composers.

== International Composition Competition ==
As an organization for new music, each year, the CML holds an International Composition Competition. The competition is organized by a committee of prominent musicians, professors and artists with a jury of notable soloists, music professors and prior Competition winners. Currently, up to five prizes are awarded, one in each style category (Baroque, Classical, Romantic, Impressionism & Contemporary). Each year, the Instrumentations for the different style categories change.

The awards include commercial sheet music publication, and premier performances of the winning compositions performed at conservatory venues around the globe. There are currently 14 participating Music Conservatories internationally that help present the premier performances of the winning works. The jury presents the awards each April after a month of deliberation.

=== 2007 Composition Winners ===
- Baroque - Joe Hills, from Fort Collins, CO (Dueling Marimbas for Marimba Duo)
- Classical - George Kontogeorgos, from Athens, Greece (Miniatures for Marimba & String Quartet)
- Romantic - Pius Cheung, from Boston, MA (Three Preludes for Solo Marimba)
- Impressionism - Nils Rohwer & Jens Schliecker, from Melsdorf, Germany (Morning-Clouds for Marimba and Piano)
- Tonal Contemporary - No 1st Prize was awarded

=== 2008 Composition Winners ===
- Baroque – No 1st Prize was awarded
- Classical – Leander Kaiser, from Germany (Minotaurus 4.3 for Marimba Solo)
- Romantic – Kit Mills, from Oak Harbor, WA (Three European Folksongs for Marimba Group - 1 marimba, 6 hands)
- Impressionism – Chin-Cheng Lin, from Taiwan (Flyology for Marimba & Piano)
- Tonal 21st Century – Casey Cangelosi, from Houston, TX (Two Characters for Marimba Solo)

== Marimba Artist Competition ==
As an organization also promoting marimba performers, each year, the CML holds an International Marimba Artist Competition. Currently, three top prizes are awarded.

The awards include: Invitations to perform at notable percussion festivals; Live recordings during the Champions Concert; as well as new marimba works commissioned by the CML specifically for the winners. The first prize winner is also awarded a private recording session during the festival. The 2008 winners were selected from applicants hailing from 9 different countries.

=== 2008 Marimba Artist Winners ===
- 1st Prize - WeiChen Lin (Taiwan)
- 2nd Prize - Hiromi Shigeno (Japan)
- 3rd Prize (tie) - Arkadiusz Kątny (Poland) & Chin-Cheng Lin (Taiwan) shared third prize.
