= Newfrontiers =

Neocharismatic British denomination

- Classification: Protestant
- Orientation: British New Church Movement
- Scripture: Christian Bible
- Theology: Calvinist reformed; evangelical; neo-charismatic
- Polity: Modified Congregational
- Founder: Terry Virgo
- Origin: 1981 as Coastlands, 1986 as Newfrontiers
- Official website: newfrontierstogether.org

Newfrontiers (previously New Frontiers International) is a global network of churches founded in Great Britain by Terry Virgo in 1980. Its origins begin in the Charismatic Movement during the 1970s, combining features of Pentecostalism with British evangelicalism with many member churches also being members of the Evangelical Alliance. In an "About" page of its web materials, Newfrontiers describes itself as "a group of apostolic leaders partnering together on global mission, joined by common values and beliefs, shared mission and genuine relationships".

== History ==
Prior to being founded as 'Coastlands' the networks leader, Terry Virgo, would regularly gather churches for an event known as 'The Downs Bible week.' This was replaced by Stoneleigh Bible Week, which was held at the National Agricultural Centre showground until its end in 2001.

The Newday camping event, "an important part of Newfrontiers", was designed for attendance by young people between the ages of 12 and 19.

The logo for the Stoneleigh Bible Weeks

According to a Newfrontiers-produced timeline of its history, "the baton" of the organisation's leadership "was passed... to fifteen apostolic leaders" at a final Leadership Conference in 2011, leaders who were worldwide, each of whom is described as being "free to develop his own strategies, training programs, and gospel advance". He also handed general oversight of Newfrontiers to Dave Devenish at that time.

According to a Newfrontiers produced timeline of its history, the organisation transitioned from the leadership of Dave Devenish over the "Newfrontiers Together Team" to that of Steve Tibbert, at the Global 2020 conference.

== Beliefs ==
=== 2024 Theological statement ===
Newfrontiers has stated, as of a September 2024 "Theological Statement", that, "[a]s part of the universal church", they "hold to the ecumenical creeds (the Apostles’, Nicene-Constantinopolitan, Chalcedonian and Athanasian Creeds)". They go on to say, "[a]s Protestant Christians, [they] affirm that justification is by faith alone, and stand in the tradition of Reformation confessional documents like the Heidelberg Catechism, although [they] believe water baptism is only for believers". They go on to note that "[a]s contemporary evangelicals, [they] also affirm modern statements such as the Lausanne Covenant and the Evangelical Alliance statement of faith".

=== Values ===
In that September 2024 statement, Newfrontiers presented what it separately termed "some core values in theology, doctrine, leadership and mission" as "an apostolic fellowship", the "Core Doctrinal Values" of which were that Newfrontiers is to be:

- "Word-based". By this it means that Newfrontiers "believe[s] in the absolute truthfulness, sufficiency, and final authority of Scripture" and that "[t]his value is expressed through the Bible having the central place in governing doctrine, practice, ethos and patterns of church life."
- "Grace-filled". By this it means that Newfrontiers believes that "the message of grace and the gospel is central to the Christian life and local church." In this more extensive statement, Newfrontiers states, in part, that "[g]race ought to be expressed in relation to salvation, church life, relationships and leadership style" and that they see salvation as a work of God from start to finish".
- "Spirit-empowered". By this it means that Newfrontiers believes that "all the gifts in Scripture are available... today". (Newfrontiers believes in continuationism.) In this more extensive statement, Newfrontiers states, in part, that "[b]eing indwelt by the [Holy] Spirit and being filled with the Spirit are theologically distinct experiences."

With regard to its "Core Leadership Values", it states that it is to:

- Be led by "Elders in each local church". By this it means that it believes that "[t]he Holy Spirit appoints elders confirmed by... church and apostolic ministry... [whose] main functions involve leading, feeding, guarding and guiding the church... [and who are] qualified men who lead as a team... with one... provid[ing] leadership to the... team as a first among equals."
- Conduct "Ephesians 4 ministries". By this it means Newfrontiers believes that "all Ephesians 4 gifts are valid today and help bring churches to maturity and to equip men and women..." and that elders "are encouraged to invite [such] ministries to... bring their local church to maturity". (Congregants are encouraged to use their gifts in the churches.) Moreover, "local elders are encouraged to invite and... receive clear apostolic input and authority".
- Display "Servantheartedness". By this it means that Newfrontiers believes "Christian leadership... is a call to... [follow] the example of Jesus... to serve others not be served. [As such] Christian leadership should be godly, transparent and accessible."

With regard to its "Core Mission Values", it is to be:

- "Local church focused". By this it means that Newfrontiers "regard[s] the local church as central to the mission and purposes of God", and as "the place of primary focus for Ephesians 4 ministries... [that] "exist to serve the local church", not vice versa. (As such, Newfrontiers operates using a form of congregationalism.)
- To have its "Mission... expressed locally, globally and holistically". By this it means that Newfrontiers believes that "local churches [ought be] involved in holistic mission, engaging with all sectors of society, particularly the poor and the marginalised" and that "local fruitfulness and effectiveness leads to a wider sphere of ministry" such that they are "caught up on a global apostolic Kingdom mission".
- To display "Contextual freedom in application". By this it means that Newfrontiers believes that its "core values will need to be contextualised and applied differently in different contexts" by "translating and applying... [them] without compromising the[ir] essence".

== Selected further values ==
=== Complementarianism ===
All Newfrontiers churches hold to a complementarian position on gender similar to that promoted by the Council on Biblical Manhood and Womanhood. This means that women are not elders. However, women are leaders – and in many churches actively preach, teach and are a part of decision-making affecting local, regional and national church decisions. Women also hold positions in almost every other area in the church and are encouraged to do so.

=== Homosexuality ===
Newfrontiers do not believe that being gay is a sin, but that sexual acts of homosexuality are not acceptable. It strongly condemns homophobia. However, views differ from church to church. There have been claims that at least one Newfrontiers church has attempted to "cure" gay people, though these have been strongly disputed.

=== Spiritual strongholds ===
A book by prominent Newfrontiers leader David Devenish on spiritual warfare, praised by Terry Virgo as a text that "will help to fortify every believer intent on winning this battle", defines spiritual warfare as

The reality that the advance of the gospel and the building of the church involve us in attacking and experiencing counter-attack in relation to real cosmic forces of darkness under the control of Satan who is also described as the god of this world.

== Responses ==
Nigel Wright believes that Newfrontiers and other British restorationists are claiming too much when they speak of "restoring the church".

In 1986, sociologist and church historian Andrew Walker wrote of Newfrontiers that "churches are far more centralised and controlled than those of… mainline charismatic fellowships… The situation seems slightly analogous to Japanese business practices: they… export with great success, but import virtually nothing from anybody else".

In April 2009, the Journal of Beliefs and Values published an article reporting on a 2007 study which "set out to examine the psychological type profile of lead elders within the Newfrontiers network of churches in the United Kingdom and to compare this profile with the established profile of clergymen in the Church of England". One of the conclusions:

There is a toughness about this style of leadership that is unlikely to be distracted by opposition. The disadvantage is that this style of leadership can leave some individuals hurt and marginalised for what is seen by the leadership as the overall benefit to the organisation.

In February 2016, musician Joseph Coward wrote an article for Vice magazine, in which he described a now disbanded Newfrontiers church. He claimed that it had "all the hallmarks of a cult".

== See also ==
- Independent Network Charismatic Christianity
