= Arthur Wallis (Bible teacher) =

Itinerant Bible teacher and author

- Born: 1922
- Died: 1988 (aged 65–66)
- Occupations: Itinerant teacher and author
- Notable work: The Radical Christian (1981)
- Movement: 'the house church movement'
- Theological work
- Language: English
- Main interests: Revival; Baptism in the Holy Spirit; Fasting; Role of women

Arthur Wallis (1922–1988) was an itinerant Bible teacher and author. Through his teaching and writing, most notably his book The Radical Christian (1981), Wallis gained the reputation of 'architect' of that expression of UK evangelicalism initially called 'the house church movement', more recently labeled British New Church Movement.

== Biography ==
Arthur Wallis was the son of 'Captain' Reginald and Mary Wallis. He attended Monkton Combe School, near Bath, Somerset, before going on to Sandhurst and wartime service in the Royal Tank Regiment. He was wounded at the Anzio Bridgehead, an event that led him to question the compatibility of his army service with his sense of calling to Christian ministry.

After the war, Wallis married Eileen Hemingway in 1949, and the couple had one son. From a Plymouth Brethren background, Wallis came into the experience of the "baptism with the Holy Spirit" in 1951, within a few weeks of his lifelong friend, the former Southampton City Missioner, Oscar Penhearow.

Following in his father's footsteps, Wallis then embarked on an itinerant preaching and teaching ministry, with a particular emphasis on revival, prayer, the work of the Holy Spirit, and the 'restoration' of the church. He had been affected by accounts of the Revival that took place on the Isle of Lewis in 1949 which he visited. His book In the Day of Thy Power (Christian Literature Crusade: 1956) was the result of this visit and his subsequent studies. He wrote eleven books on themes promoting the Christian life, and travelled widely (in particular to the US, Australia and New Zealand).

For much of his life Wallis lived in Talaton in Devon, moving in the last decade of his life, first to Yorkshire to join Bryn Jones' Covenant Ministries, and later in 1981 to Southampton to be part of the leadership of the Community Church, Southampton.

His book, God's Chosen Fast (Kingsway: 1968) is an acknowledged classic on the topic of fasting, whilst his book The Radical Christian (Kingsway: 1981) calls the Christian to live the life of Jesus.

=== Baptism in the Holy Spirit ===
Stanley Jebb records in Arthur Wallis: A Tribute, that when asked, 'Why is there no exhortation in the epistles to get baptised in the Holy Spirit?' he replied, 'For the same reason there is no exhortation to get baptised in water: the recipients of the letters had received both water and Holy Spirit baptism already.'

=== Fasting ===
He wrote a book on fasting called God's Chosen Fast. This work has been referred to by the pastor John Piper.

=== Role of women ===
In an article in Restoration magazine entitles Women in the Plan of God he wrote "The church and the world has yet to feel the impact of modern Priscillas and Phoebes, moving under the heavenly anointing and yet within the divine order."

== Personal life ==
=== Care for his mother ===
For a time Wallis's itinerant ministry was restricted as he cared for his ailing mother. In Arthur Wallis: A Tribute (edited by Dave Matthew), Mike Stevens states: "For five years he and his brother, Peter, cared for her in their homes, and he steadfastly refused to release himself by putting her into nursing care."

== Works ==
- In the Day of Thy Power (Christian Literature Crusade: 1956)
- Jesus of Nazareth: Who is He? (Christian Literature Crusade: 1959)
- Jesus Prayed (Gateway: 1967)
- God’s Chosen Fast (Kingsway: 1968)
- Pray in the Spirit (Kingsway: 1970)
- Into Battle (Kingsway: 1973)
- Rain from Heaven (Hodder & Stoughton: 1979) - this is an abridged, updated and re-written version of his earlier work In the Day of Thy Power
- The Radical Christian (Kingsway: 1981)
- Living God’s Way (Kingsway: 1984)
- China Miracle: A silent explosion (City Hill: 1986)

== Sources ==
- Matthew, David (ed.), Arthur Wallis: A Tribute, special supplement in Restoration magazine. Harvestime, 1988.
- Wallis, Jonathan, Arthur Wallis: Radical Christian, Kingsway, 1991. ISBN 0-86065-852-X.
