= Charismatic Christianity =

Form of Christianity

Charismatic Christianity is a form of Christianity that emphasizes the work of the Holy Spirit and spiritual gifts as an everyday part of a believer's life. It has a global presence in the Christian community. Practitioners are often called charismatic Christians or renewalists. Although there is considerable overlap, charismatic Christianity is often categorized into three separate groups: Pentecostalism, the charismatic movement (which is spread across historical Christian denominations), and the neo-charismatic movement.

Charismatic Christianity grew out of Protestantism and is distinguished from Pentecostalism in that it is a movement within traditional and not Pentecostal denominations. According to the Pew Research Center, Pentecostals and Charismatic Christians numbered over 584 million worldwide as of 2011.

== Etymology ==
The term charismatic derives from the Koine Greek word χάρισμα khárisma ('gift'), derived from χάρις kháris ('grace' or 'favor'), itself from χαίρω khaírō ('to be happy'). The 17th-century form charism specifically refers to divine gifts. Middle English also adopted the word as karisme to refer to gifts of healing and teaching.

== History ==
With traditions of Pentecostalism already developed in the 18th century out of Protestant evangelicalism, the beginning of the charismatic movement in historic Christian churches came in 1960 at St. Mark's Episcopal Church in Van Nuys, California. Dennis Bennett, the church's rector, announced to the congregation that he had received the outpouring of the Holy Spirit.

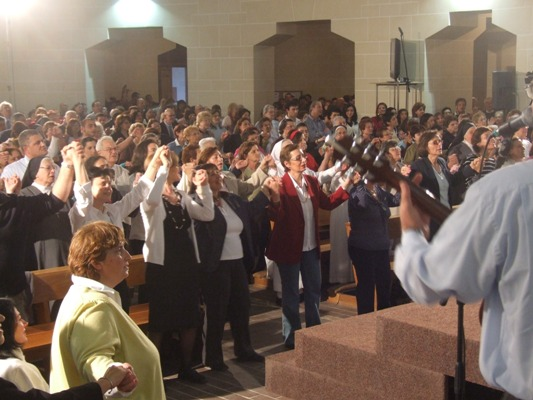
Praise and worship during a Catholic Charismatic Renewal healing service

The charismatic movement reached Lutherans and Presbyterians in 1962. Among Roman Catholics, it spread around 1967. Methodists became involved in the charismatic movement in the 1970s.

Some nondenominational evangelical churches decided to follow this movement and take distance from their Pentecostal conventions. Calvary Chapel in Costa Mesa, California, is one of the first evangelical neo-charismatic churches started in 1965. In the United Kingdom, Jesus Army, founded in 1969, is an example of the impact outside of the United States. The spread of the charismatic movement outside of the US was also encouraged by Bennett, who traveled to Vancouver to minister there. Many other congregations were established in the rest of the world. Modern churches internationally have embraced the charismatic movement or adapted their own practices to incorporate it. In the United Kingdom, the house church movement has grown to include charismatic practices. Hillsong Church in Australia is another example of a Pentecostal church that incorporates the charismatic movement. The neo-charismatic movement, also known as the Third Wave, a term coined by C. Peter Wagner, has also spread widely since 1970; these churches often reject the charismatic or Pentecostal label but accept the general practice of accepting gifts of the Spirit.

Some scholars attribute the quick and successful spread of charismatic Christianity to its successful use of mass media platforms, but also to the physical experience of religion that it provides, which creates a personal connection to spiritual mediation for believers.

== Distinguishing beliefs ==
Charismatic Christianity is an overarching grouping of connected beliefs and practices, and is not itself strictly defined within specific practices. Denominations within the grouping share a spirituality characterized by a worldview where miracles, signs and wonders, and other supernatural occurrences are expected to be present in the lives of believers. This includes the presence of spiritual gifts, such as prophecy and healing. While similar in many respects, some sub-groups do differ in important ways. These differences have led to Charismatic Christianity being categorized into three main groups: Pentecostalism, the Charismatic movement, and neo-charismatic movement.

The Charismatic movement has sometimes been related to the New Age revival in the United States from the 1960s and 1970s.

=== Pentecostals ===
Pentecostals are those Christians who identify with the beliefs and practices of classical Pentecostal denominations, such as the Assemblies of God or the Church of God (Cleveland, Tennessee). Classical Pentecostalism grew out of the holiness movement and developed a distinct identity at the start of the 20th century after being popularized by Charles Fox Parham and his student William J. Seymour. Seymour founded what is considered the first Pentecostal ministry in Los Angeles in 1906. At a time when most denominations affirmed cessationism (the belief that spiritual gifts had ceased), Pentecostals held that the gifts of the Holy Spirit were being restored to the Christian church. The distinctive doctrine of Pentecostalism is that there is a second work of grace after conversion, which Pentecostals call the baptism in the Holy Spirit, that is evidenced by speaking in tongues. Speaking in tongues is considered evidence of the presence of the Spirit. There are also the nontrinitarian Oneness Pentecostals, who share such beliefs on the validity of the spiritual gifts in the modern church, but who differ on varying views on the Godhead and teachings on outward holiness. Pentecostalism has several core doctrines around which their beliefs are centered; these include salvation through Jesus, healing through Jesus, baptism through Jesus and the Holy Spirit and finally that Jesus is coming again. Pentecostalism is also characterized by moralism, and often forbids followers to drink alcohol or wear jewelry.

=== Charismatic movement ===
While early Pentecostals were often marginalized within the larger Christian community, Pentecostal beliefs began penetrating the mainline Protestant denominations from 1960 onward and the Catholic Church from 1967. This adoption of Pentecostal beliefs by those in the historic churches became known as the charismatic movement. Charismatics are defined as Christians who share with Pentecostals an emphasis on the gifts of the Spirit but who remain a part of a mainline church. Also, charismatics are more likely than Pentecostals to believe that glossolalia—speaking in tongues—is not a necessary evidence of Spirit baptism. This transition occurred following an increased popularity of use of the gifts of spirit during the healing revival period of 1946–1958. Massive interdenominational meetings held by the healing revival evangelists, including William M. Branham, Oral Roberts, A.A. Allen and others, led to increased awareness and acceptance.

The charismatic movement within the historic Christian churches holds that baptism in the Holy Spirit is the "sovereign action of God, which usually occurs when someone with a disposition of surrender and docility, prays for a fresh outpouring of the Holy Spirit in his or her life." Adherents of the movement teach the belief that "baptism in the Holy Spirit unleashes the Holy Spirit that is already present within us, by revitalizing the graces we received in the sacrament of Baptism" and that it "equips and inspires the individual for service, for mission, for discipleship and for life." Rev. Brenton Cordeiro summarizes that he sees those who received baptism with the Holy Spirit "testify that the experience brought them to a new awareness of the reality and presence of Jesus Christ in their lives [as well as] a new hunger for the Word of God, the Sacraments and were filled with a renewed desire for holiness."

=== Neo-charismatic movement ===
The fervor seen in the spread of Charismatic Christianity led to the creation of independent evangelical charismatic churches more in tune with this revival of the Holy Spirit. Calvary Chapel Costa Mesa, California is one of the first evangelical charismatic churches in 1965. In United Kingdom, Jesus Army, founded in 1969, is an example of the impact outside the US. Many other congregations were established in the rest of the world.

New churches and denominations emerged alongside the charismatic movements within the historic Christian churches since 1970 that are termed neo-charismatic. Accepting neither the label of Pentecostal nor Charismatic, they share with these groups a common emphasis on the Holy Spirit, spiritual gifts, miracles, and Pentecostal experiences. These groups are often called "The Third Wave", to separate them from the original Pentecostals (the "First Wave") and from the wider charismatic movement of the 1970s (the "Second Wave"). Neo-charismatic churches often consider themselves non-denominational or would not accept the neo-charismatic label, instead drawing from the charismatic practices of spiritual gifts or identifying with wider movements and groups such as the U.S. Strategic Prayer Network, the New Apostolic Reformation, or other large religious movements.

== Statistics ==
In 2011, there were 279 million Pentecostal Christians worldwide, making up 4 percent of the world's population and 12.8 percent of the wider Christian population. Charismatic Christians numbered 305 million, or about 4.4 percent of the world's population and 14 percent of the Christian population. Together, these groups make up 26.8 percent of the world's Christian population and over 8 percent of the world. Regionally, the highest concentration of Charismatic Christians live in the Americas, which houses 48.5 percent of the group. The next highest concentration is in the Asia-Pacific region, with another 29.6 percent of Charismatic Christians residing there.

== See also ==
- Catholic Charismatic Renewal
- Cessationism versus Continuationism
- Charismatic Adventism
- Direct revelation
- Faith healing
- Full Gospel Business Men's Fellowship International
- Latter Rain (1880s movement)
- Latter Rain (post-World War II movement)
- Christian laying on of hands
- Montanism – a late 2nd-century, heterodox Christian movement which emphasized sensitivity to the leading of the Holy Spirit
- Neo-charismatic movement
- Renewal theologian
- Slain in the Spirit
- Word of Knowledge
- Word of wisdom
- Xenoglossy
