= Laying on of hands =

Religious ritual in various cultures

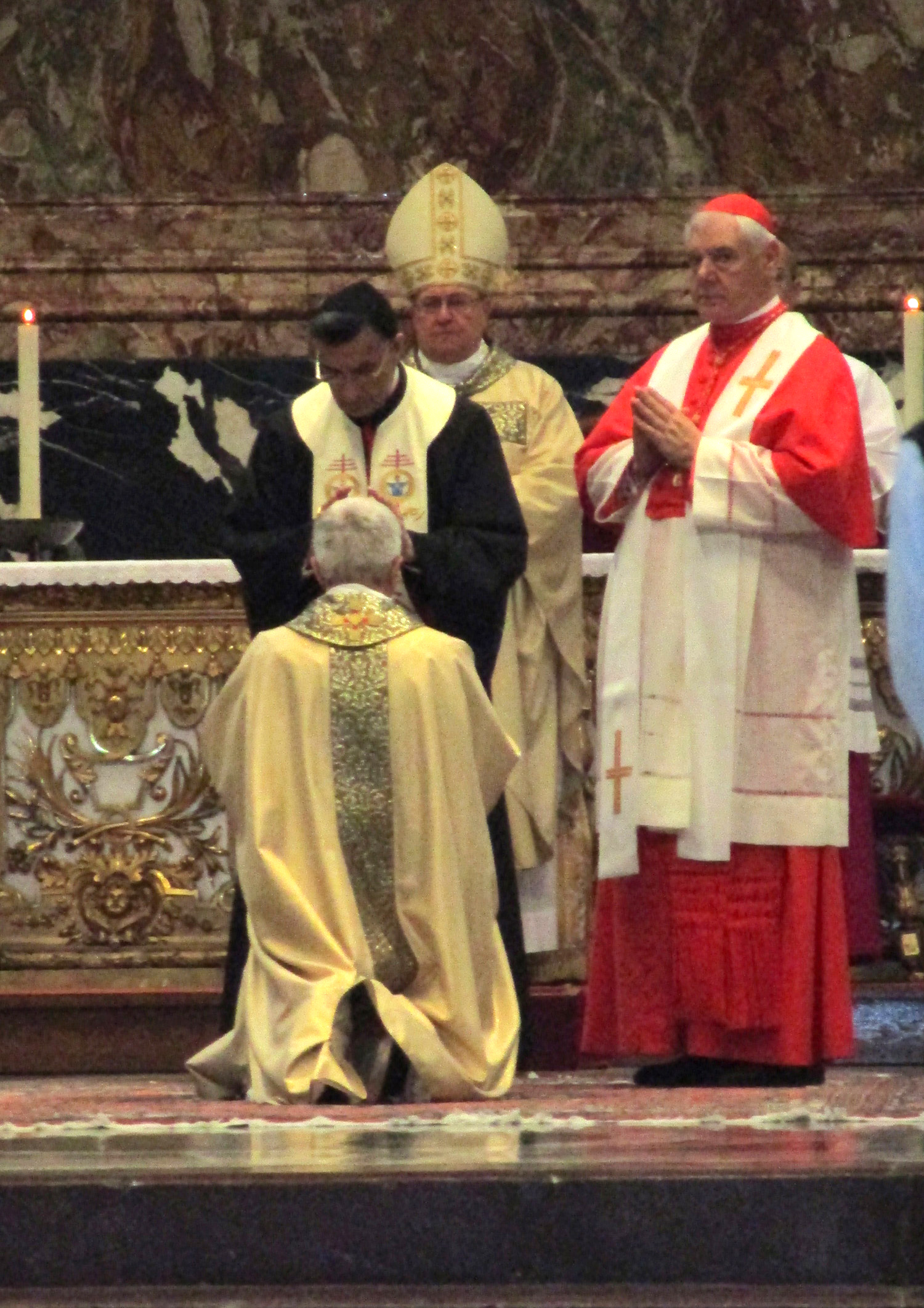
Catholic ordination ceremony with laying on of hands

The laying on of hands is a widely-used religious practice involving one or more people physically placing or resting their hands on another person, typically the person being prayed over, blessed, healed or ordained. The physical contact is understood within many religious traditions as a symbolic or ceremonial means of conveying authority, healing, spiritual support, or the presence and power of the Holy Spirit. In Judaism, semikhah (Hebrew: סמיכה, "leaning [of the hands]") accompanies the conferring of a blessing or authority. In Christian churches, chirotony is used as both a symbolic and formal method of invoking the Holy Spirit primarily during baptisms and confirmations, healing services, blessings, and ordination of priests, ministers, elders, deacons, and other church officers, along with a variety of other church sacraments and holy ceremonies.

== Jewish tradition ==
The laying on of hands was an action referred to on numerous occasions in the Hebrew Bible to accompany the conferring of a blessing or authority. Moses ordained Joshua through semikhah—i.e. by the laying on of hands: Num 27:15–23, Deut 34:9. The Bible adds that Joshua was thereby "filled with the spirit of wisdom". Moses also ordained the 70 elders (Num 11:16–25). The elders later ordained their successors in this way. Their successors in turn ordained others. This chain of hands-on semikhah continued through the time of the Second Temple, to an undetermined time. The exact date that the original semikhah succession ended is not certain. Many medieval authorities believed that this occurred during the reign of Hillel II, circa 360 CE. However, it seems to have continued at least until 425 CE when Theodosius II executed Gamaliel VI and suppressed the Patriarchate and Sanhedrin.

Laying on of hands can also refer to the practice of laying hands over one's sacrificial animal (sin-offering), before it was slaughtered, based on a teaching in Leviticus 4:24: "And he shall lay his hand upon the head of the goat." In Pseudo Jonathan's Aramaic translation of the Pentateuch, the translator of the verse explains its sense: "And he shall lay his right hand with force on the head of the goat." According to Philo of Alexandria, the custom of laying on of hands was done in conjunction with a declaration, where the owner of the animal would say: "These hands have not taken a bribe to distort justice, neither have they divided the spoil, etc." According to Jewish tradition, the first dispute in Israel concerned whether or not it was permissible to lay hands upon one's sacrificial animal by applying one's full body weight on a Festival Day.

== Christian traditions ==
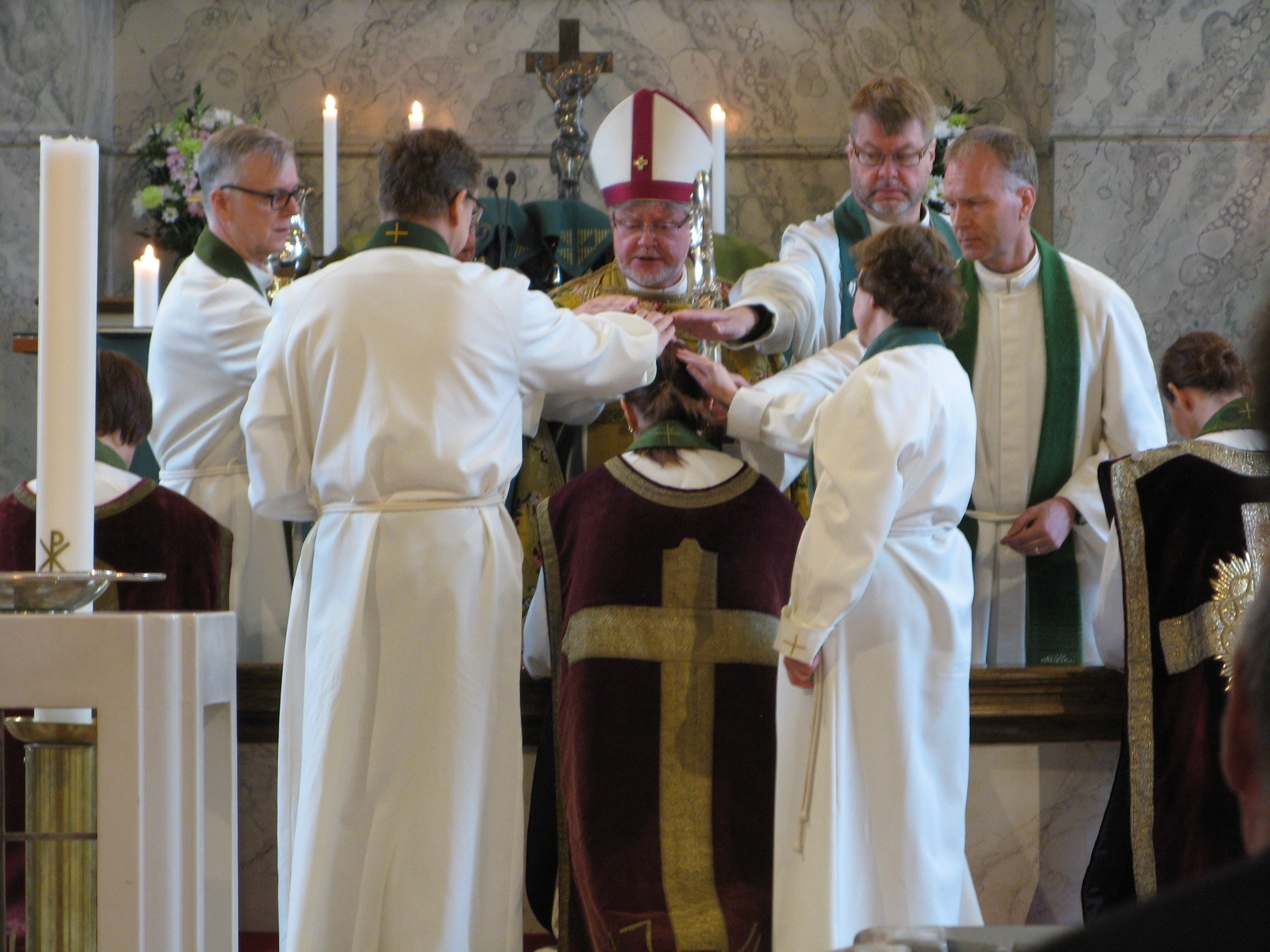
Laying on of hands during a Finnish Lutheran ordination in Oulu, Finland

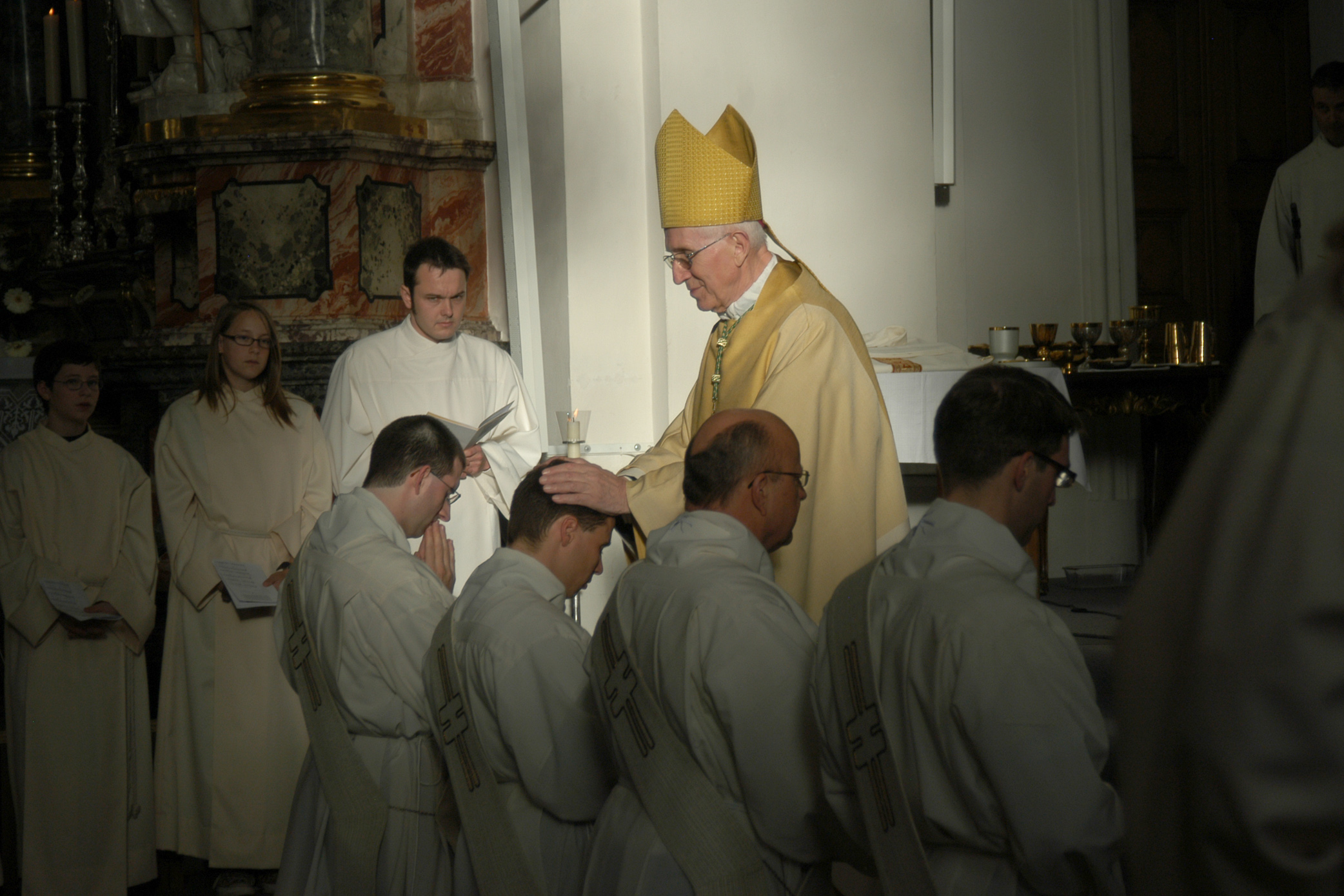
Laying on of hands during a Catholic priestly ordination in Germany

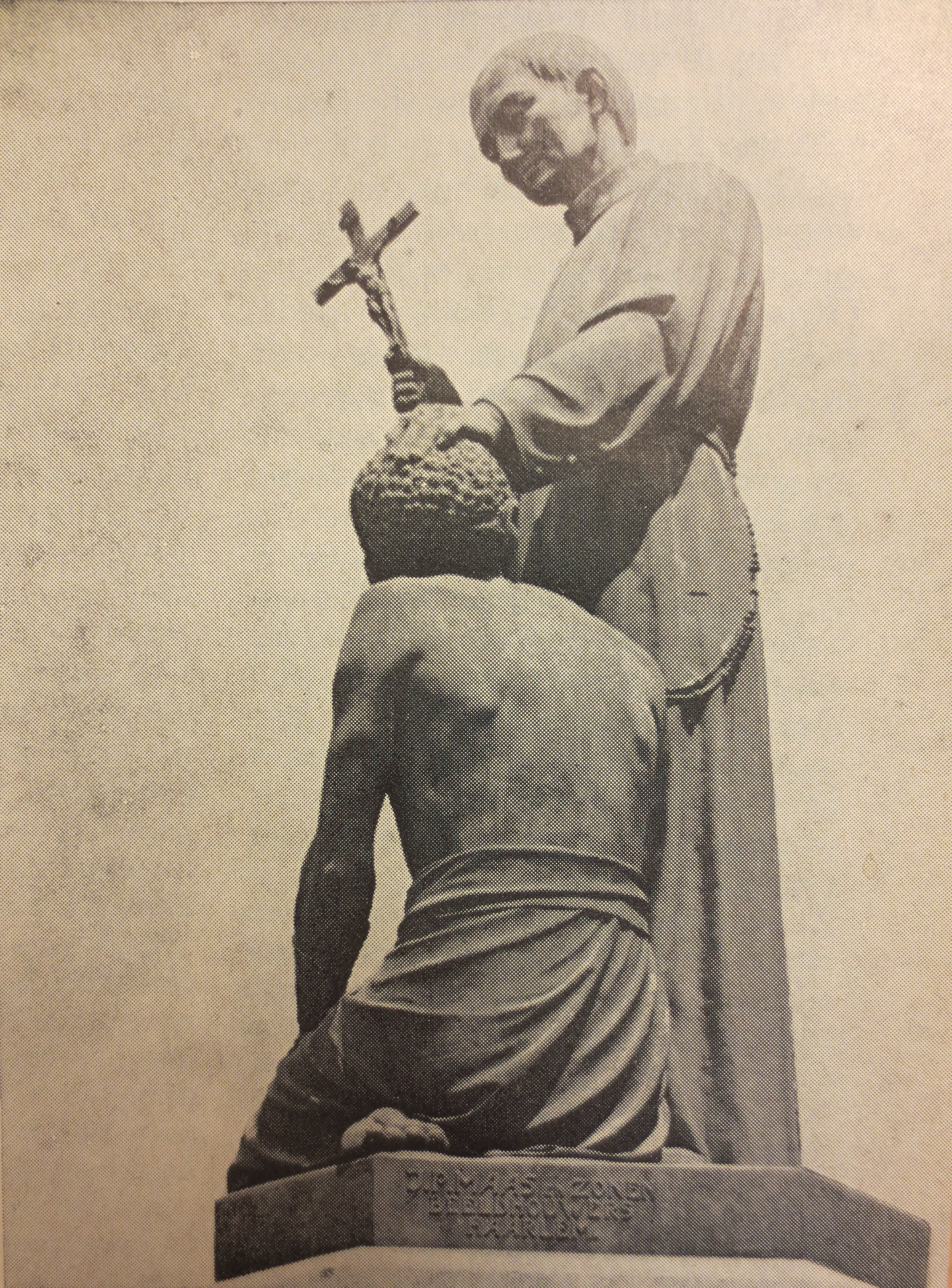
Laying on of hand by a missionary; conversion to Christianity as a form of healing. Statue in Tilburg, Netherlands

In the New Testament the laying on of hands was associated with the receiving of the Holy Spirit (see Acts 8:14–19). Initially the Apostles laid hands on new believers as well as believers (see Acts 6:5–6).

The New Testament also associates the laying on of hands with the conferral of authority or designation of a person to a position of responsibility. (See Acts 6:6, Acts 13:3; and 1 Timothy 4:14. Also possibly Acts 14:23, where "ordained"—Greek: χειροτονήσαντες—may be translated "extended the hand".) The use of the laying on of hands for the ordination of church officers has continued in many branches of Christianity.

=== Anglicanism ===
Laying on of hands is part of Anglican confirmation, anointing of the sick, and other parts of liturgy and pastoral offices. The rubric in the confirmation service requires the bishop to lay only one hand, symbolising that he has less spiritual authority than an apostle (who laid both hands).

=== Catholic Church ===
In the Catholic Church, the laying on of hands has been and continues to be used in some of the rites for the Seven Sacraments of the Catholic Church. First, it is the essential gesture (or "matter") for the Sacrament of Holy Orders (diaconate, priesthood, and episcopacy). Second, it accompanies the anointing with Sacred Chrism in the Sacrament of Confirmation. Third, it is part of the ritual for the Sacrament of the Anointing of the Sick, taken after the command in the Epistle of James: "Is anyone among you sick? Let him call for the elders of the church, and let them pray over him, anointing him with oil in the name of the Lord" (James 5:14 ESV).

The laying on of hands also has historical significance in the Catholic sacrament of Penance and Reconciliation. There is evidence in early Christian sources that laying on of hands took place in penitential practice. The gesture was connected with reconciling penitents with the Church. The laying on of hands became less common during the medieval period as penitential practices shifting from public to private forms. Following the Second Vatican Council, the importance of the gesture was renewed in the Sacrament of Penance. During this rite, the priest extends either the right hand or both hands over the penitent during part of the formula of absolution.

=== Eastern Christianity ===
In Eastern Christianity, laying on of hands is used for the ordination (called cheirotonia) of the higher clergy (bishops, priests and deacons), and is also performed at the end of the sacrament of unction.

=== Evangelicalism ===
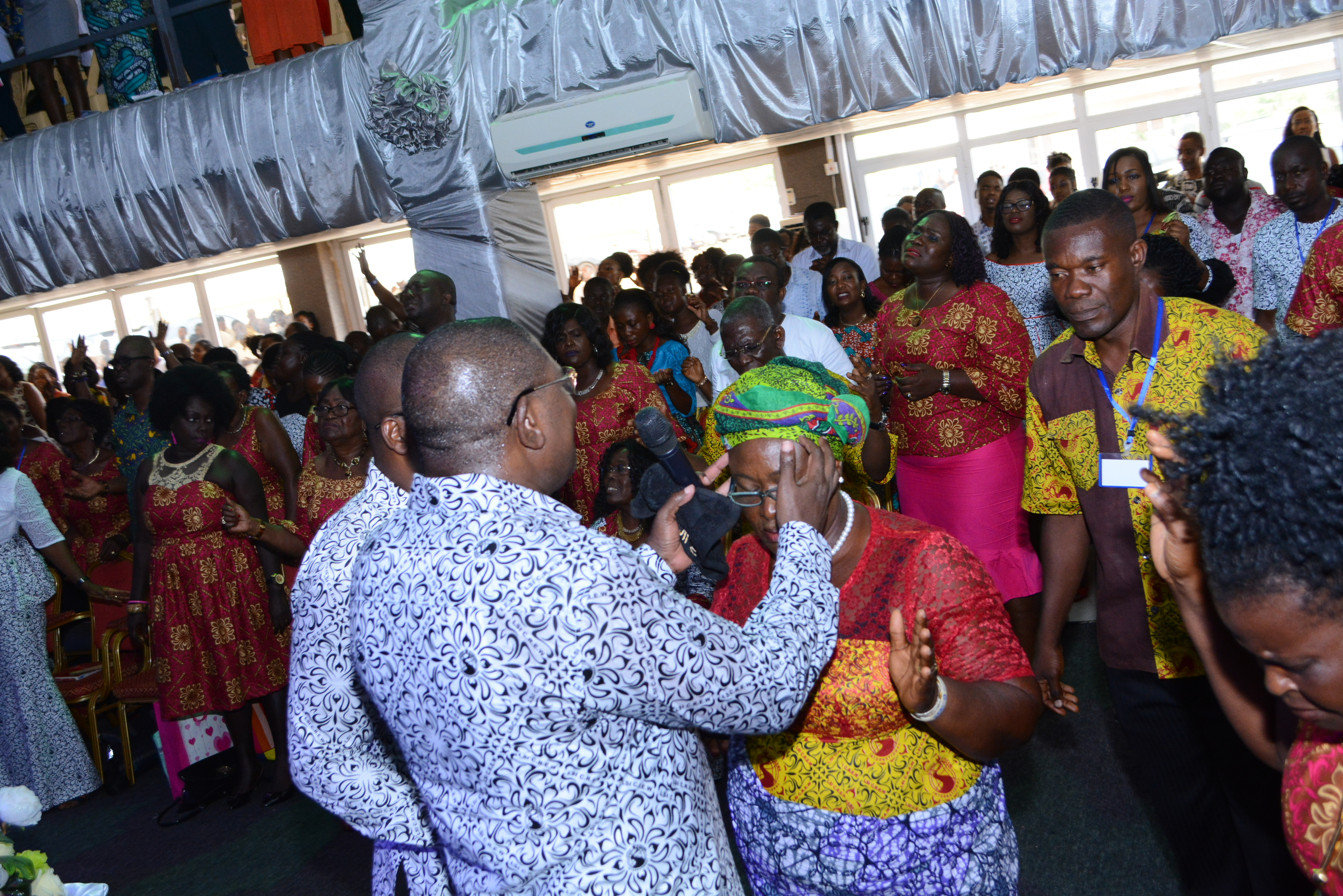
Laying on of hands for healing in Living Streams International Church, Accra, Ghana, 2018

In Evangelical Christianity, the laying on of hands takes place for pastoral ordination.

==== Baptists ====
In few Baptist churches, the laying on of hands rarely takes place after a believer's baptism although this is traditional to some sects and not practiced as a Biblical command nor example. This is one of the two points which was added in the 1689 Baptist Confession of Faith in 1742. Southern Baptist Christians employ the laying on of hands during the ordination of clergymen (such as deacons, assistant, and senior pastors) as well as situations of calling for divine healing.

==== Pentecostalism ====
Pentecostal Christians practice the laying on of hands as part of prayer for divine healing (faith healing) and the anointing of the sick.

=== Latter-day Saints ===
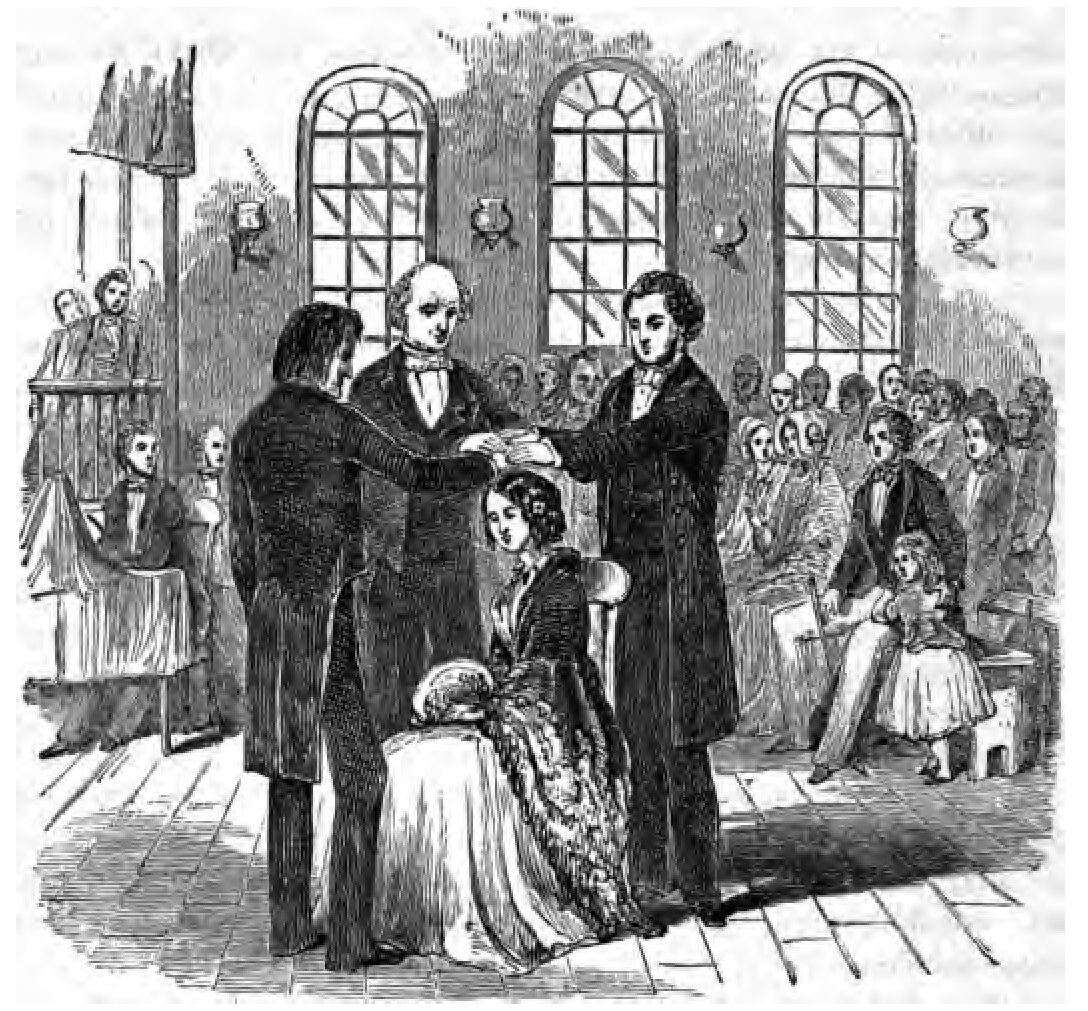
An 1850s depiction of a Latter Day Saint confirmation featuring the laying on of hands

Members of the Church of Jesus Christ of Latter-day Saints believe the restoration of Christ's priesthood came about by the laying on of hands by the resurrected John the Baptist to Joseph Smith and Oliver Cowdery in 1829, and laying on of hands is seen as a necessary part of Confirmation. Latter-day Saints lay on hands when ordaining members to the Aaronic and Melchizedek priesthoods and when setting members apart to serve in other positions in the church. When asked by a member who is ill, two elders of the Church anoint the sick member's head with consecrated olive oil and then lay hands upon their head and as guided by the Holy Spirit, bless them.

== African traditional medicine ==
The San peoples of Southern Africa use the laying on of hands as a healing practice. As described by professor Richard Katz, the healers of the !Kung people lay their hands on a sick person to draw the sickness out of them and into the healer in a "difficult, painful" process.

== Navajo religious ceremonies ==
A similar practice of laying on of hands is also used in Navajo religious ceremonies.

== State use ==
The laying on of hands, known as the royal touch, was performed by kings in England and France, and was believed to cure scrofula (also called "King's Evil" at the time), a name given to a number of skin diseases. The rite of the king's touch began in France with Robert II the Pious, but legend later attributed the practice to Clovis as Merovingian founder of the Holy Roman kingdom, and Edward the Confessor was seen as the first monarch in England to use the healing touch in England.

The belief continued to be common throughout the Middle Ages but began to die out with the Enlightenment. Queen Anne was the last British monarch to claim to possess this divine ability, though the Jacobite pretenders also claimed to do so. The French monarchy maintained the practice up until the 19th century. The act was usually performed at large ceremonies, often at Easter or other holy days.

== See also ==
- Anointing
- Apostolic Succession
- Exorcism
- Faith healing
- Gifts of healing
- Gift of miracles
- Holy anointing oil
- Hypnosis
- Manual therapy
- Ordination
- Pneumatology
- Priesthood blessing
- Reiki
- Right hand of Christian fellowship
- Snake handling
- Speaking in tongues
- Spiritual gift
- Spirituality
- Thaumaturgy
