= Act of Oblation =

Act of Oblation may refer to:

- the formal action of becoming an Oblate within the Benedictine religious community
- a prayer written by Thérèse of Lisieux for herself and her sister Celine.
