= Seoul Sungrak Church =

- Hangul: 서울성락교회
- Hanja: 서울聖樂敎會
- Revised Romanization: Seoulseongnakgyohoe
- McCune–Reischauer: Sŏulsŏngnakkyohoe

Seoul Sungrak Church is an Evangelical charismatic Church in Seoul, South Korea.

== History ==
It was founded by Ki Dong Kim in 1969. In 2010, it would have 150,000 members.

== Pastor ==
Ki Dong Kim is a Korean Christian pastor and a poet. He is the Senior Overseer and Founder of Seoul Sungrak Church. He has published four books of his poetry, and has been invited to international poetry festivals such as the XVIII International Poetry Festival of Medellín in 2008.

== Writings ==
John N. Vaughan. The World's 20 Largest Churches (Grand Rapids, MI: Baker Book House, 1984), 71-75. ISBN 0-8010-9297-3

John N. Vaughan. The Large Church (Grand rapids, MI: Baker Book House, 1985), 62. ISBN 0-8010-9298-1

John N. Vaughan. Absolutely Double! (Bolivar, MO: Megachurch Research Press, 1990).

Ki Dong Kim with Jimi Miller. Semone (Shippenburg, PA: Treasure House, 1996). ISBN 1-56043-266-7
