= Oblates of St. Frances of Rome =

Roman Catholic religious congregation for women

The Oblates of St. Frances of Rome (in latin: Congregatio Oblatarum Turris Speculorum) are a monastic community in Rome of women oblates founded by St. Frances of Rome in 1433 to provide for a life of prayer and service among the wealthier women of the city. The group quickly developed a life in common, without monastic vows, committed to prayer and service to the poor of the city. They still continue today in this way of life here at their one and only monastery.

== Origins ==
St. Frances (1378-1440) was a native and noblewoman of the city who had wanted to be a nun when she was a child. Despite being compelled to enter into an arranged marriage with a wealthy and aristocratic member of the papal military forces, she and her husband were happily married. However, the couple were not spared personal suffering, losing two young children to the various plagues which afflicted the city at that time. It was a time of famine, war, looting, and epidemics in Rome, due in large part, to the neglect it suffered during the period of the Great Schism within the Church, as three different cardinals established themselves as rival popes, two of them based in France.

Frances became aware of the suffering of the general populace in the city. Already a pious and devout wife, she recruited other noble wives to join in caring for the poor and the sick. She and her sister-in-law frequented the various Rome hospitals, nursing the sick and distributing food to the hungry. Gradually, her longheld desire for monastic life developed into a desire to unite this vocation with service of the poor. Finally in 1425 she decided that she would henceforth renounce the conjugal life, and her husband agreed to this.

On August 15, she and nine companions made monastic oblation at the Olivetan Monastery attached to the Church of Santa Maria Nova. The women did not take vows, or did they wear any special religious habit, but placed themselves under the spiritual direction of the Olivetan Benedictine monks. As Benedictine oblates, they continued to live in their family homes, maintaining additionally a routine of prayer and service. Frances herself continued to live at home with her husband until his death in 1436.

Within a few years some of the women began to desire to live a life in common, so as to be able to practice more easily the spiritual exercises and also have greater freedom to dedicate themselves to the needs of the poor. This way of life was already widespread in Rome at the time for both men and women who belonged to the Third Order of St. Francis and to other new spiritual movements. Agreement was reached that those among the women who had become oblates could, if they wished, live a common life, making their own Benedictine spirituality. This form of community life as adopted by the oblates did not, however, involve binding themselves by monastic vows after the manner of nuns. Instead, the women would still be free to carry on with serving the poor outside in the city's streets and hospitals.

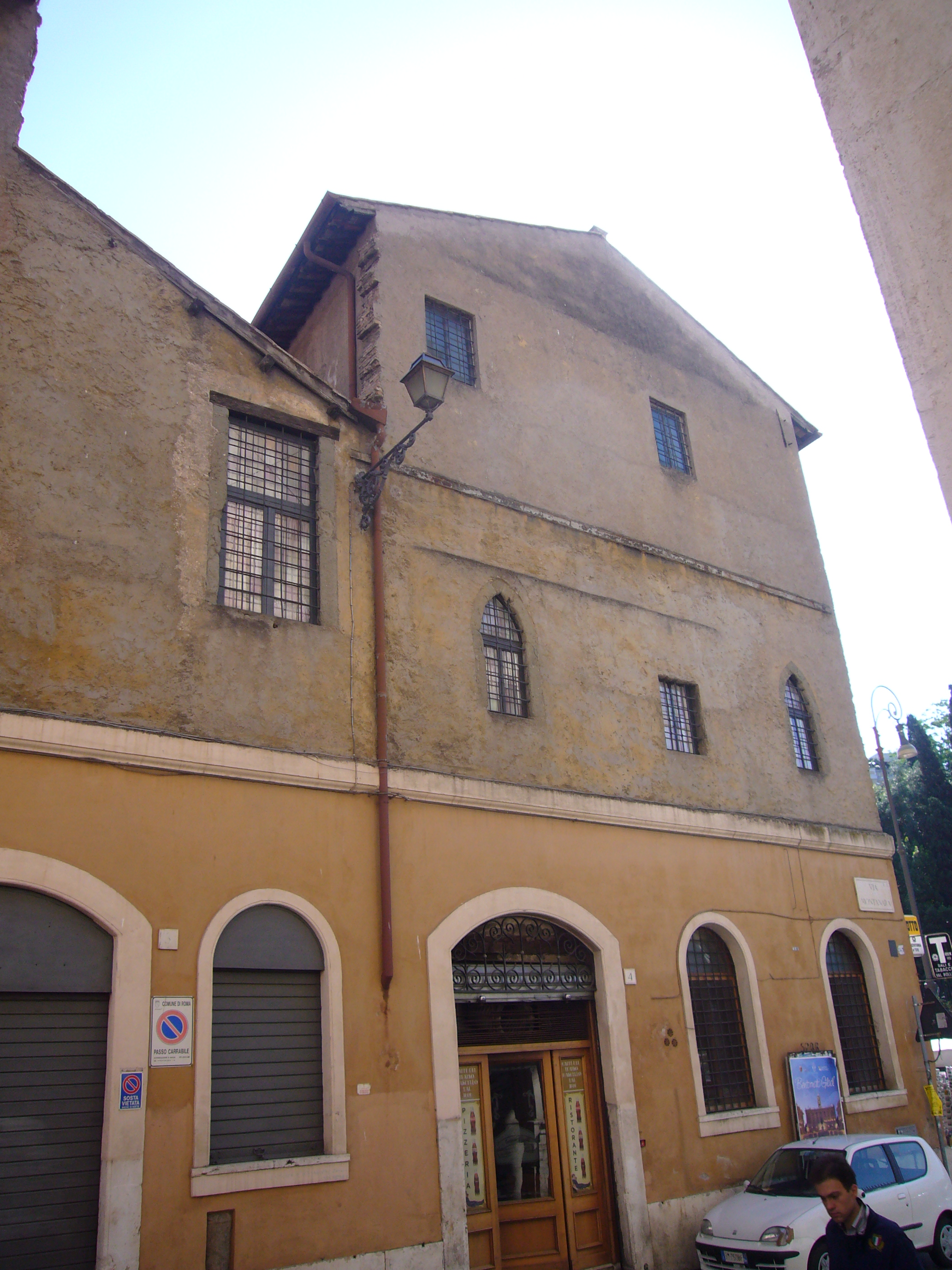

Frances was inspired to name St. Paul, St. Benedict and St. Mary Magdalen as the patron saints of the new community. In the early days, there were four members. They continued to live without vows, but otherwise lived a typical monastic life of prayer and manual labor. The monastery received papal approval on July 4 of that same year. In this way they established what for the period was an innovative form of religious life, neither cloistered nuns nor laity. St. Frances joined them upon the death of her husband in 1436, becoming the head of the community, a post she held till her death four years later.

The Oblates were not formally recognized as religious sisters, however, until a special decree of Pope John XXIII in 1958, by which he decreed that the particular form of commitment entered into by the Oblates was henceforth to be recognized as the equivalent of canonical vows.

== Monastery of Tor de' Specchi ==
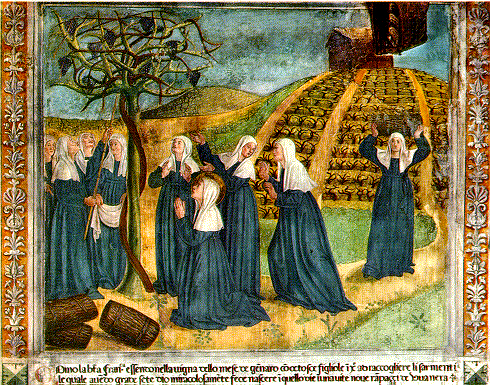
Tor de' Specchi Oblates harvesting grapes, 1468

The Monastery of Tor de' Specchi (Italian: [ˈtor de ˈspɛkki]; literally "Tower of the Mirrors") is the home of the Oblates of St. Frances of Rome. Located in the heart of the city, the house was established as such on 25 March 1433, the Feast of the Annunciation.

Frances acquired a house near the Campidoglio, next to the church of Sant'Andrea dei Funari (later called Sant'Andrea in Vincis, but later demolished). This stood in the shade of the fortified tower built by the Specchi family, from which the house takes its name (Italian: Torre degli Specchi). The atrium was originally a stable with an old manger, the lid of a large Roman sarcophagus, which Frances used to distribute food and clothing to the poor.

The chapel is decorated with frescoes by Antoniazzo Romano depicting scenes from the life of Frances. It is open to the public each year on her feast day, Match 9.

== Present day ==
The community still lives according to the same general pattern established at their founding. The Oblates follow a basic monastic routine and offer a ministry of hospitality in the heart of the city of Rome. Instead of the standard three vows, they promise obedience to the head of the community, and prime also that should they chose to leave (which they remain free to do if they wish), they will do so in a way which will not disrupt the lives of the community. It remains the community's sole house.

The Oblates engage in daily common prayer and acts of charity to the poor and the less fortunate. Characteristics of the congregation are a particular devotion to the Virgin Mary, to the guardian Angel and service to the Church of Rome. As of 2017, there were six sisters in residence.

== The Agnus Dei ==
By special privilege, the Sisters of Tor de' Specchi are the only ones permitted to make an item of special papal significance. It is a small wax image of Christ as the Lamb of God (Latin: Agnus Dei). This is presented by the pope as a token of honor to those whom the Holy See wishes to recognize as having given notable service to the Church. They are blessed during Holy Week and distributed at Easter.

== See also ==
- Order of St. Benedict
- Olivetans
