= Frances of Rome =

Italian saint

Saint Frances of Rome Obl.S.B.
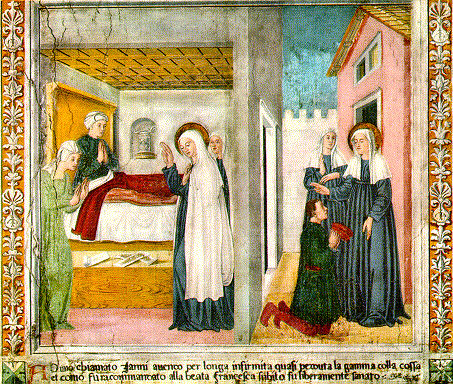
- Part of a series The Life of St. Frances of Rome; Tor de' Specchi Monastery, Rome, Italy by Antoniazzo Romano (1468)

Patroness of Benedictine Oblates, Confessor
- Born: Francesca Bussa de' Leoni; 1384; Rome, Papal States
- Died: March 9, 1440 (aged 55–56); Rome, Papal States
- Venerated in: Roman Catholic Church
- Canonized: 1608, Rome, Papal States by Pope Paul V
- Major shrine: Church of Santa Francesca Romana, Rome, Italy
- Feast: March 9
- Patronage: Benedictine oblates, automobile drivers, widows

Francesca Bussa de' Leoni (1384 – 9 March 1440), known as Frances of Rome Obl.S.B. (Italian: Francesca Romana; Latin: Francisca Rōmāna), was an Italian Catholic mystic, organizer of charitable services and a Benedictine oblate who founded a religious community of oblates, who share a common life without religious vows. She was canonized in 1608.

== Life ==
Frances was born in 1384 in Rome to a wealthy and aristocratic couple, Paolo Bussa de' Leoni and Iacobella dei Roffredeschi, in the up-and-coming district of Parione and christened in the nearby Church of St. Agnes on the famed Piazza Navona. When she was eleven years old, she wanted to be a nun, but, at about the age of twelve, her parents forced her to marry Lorenzo Ponziani, commander of the papal troops of Rome and member of an extremely wealthy family. Although the marriage had been arranged, it was a happy one that lasted for forty years.

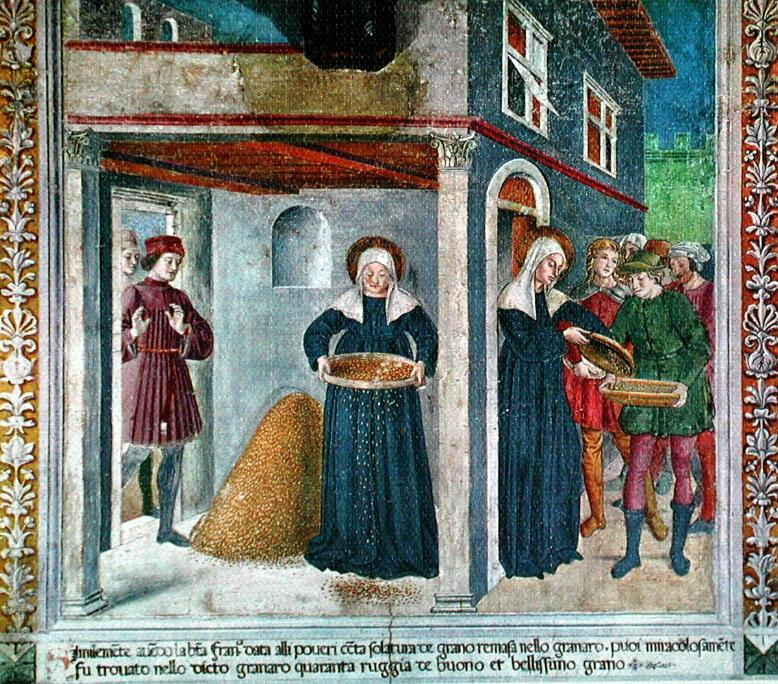
Santa Francesca Romana e il miracolo del grano

With her sister-in-law Vannozza, Frances visited the poor and cared for the sick, inspiring other wealthy women in the city to do the same. Soon after her marriage, Frances fell seriously ill. Her husband called a man in who dabbled in magic, but Frances drove him away, saying, "Begone, thou servant of Satan, nor ever venture into these walls again!" and later recounted to Vannozza that St. Alexius had appeared to her and cured her.

When her mother-in-law died, Frances became the mistress of the household. During a time of flood and famine, she turned part of the family's house estate into a hospital and distributed food and clothing to people experiencing poverty. According to one account, her father-in-law was so angry that he took away her keys to the supply rooms, but gave them back when he saw that the corn bin and wine barrel had been replenished after Frances finished praying.

During the wars between the pope in Rome and various anti-popes in the Western Schism of the Catholic Church, Lorenzo served the former. According to one story, their son Battista was to be delivered as a hostage to the commander of the Neapolitan troops. Obeying this order on the command of her spiritual director, Frances took her son to the Campidoglio. On the way, she stopped in the Church of the Aracoeli located there and entrusted her son's life to the Blessed Mother. When they arrived at the appointed site, the soldiers tried to put her son on a horse to transport him to captivity. However, the horse refused to move despite heavy whipping. The soldiers saw the hand of God in this and returned the boy to his mother.

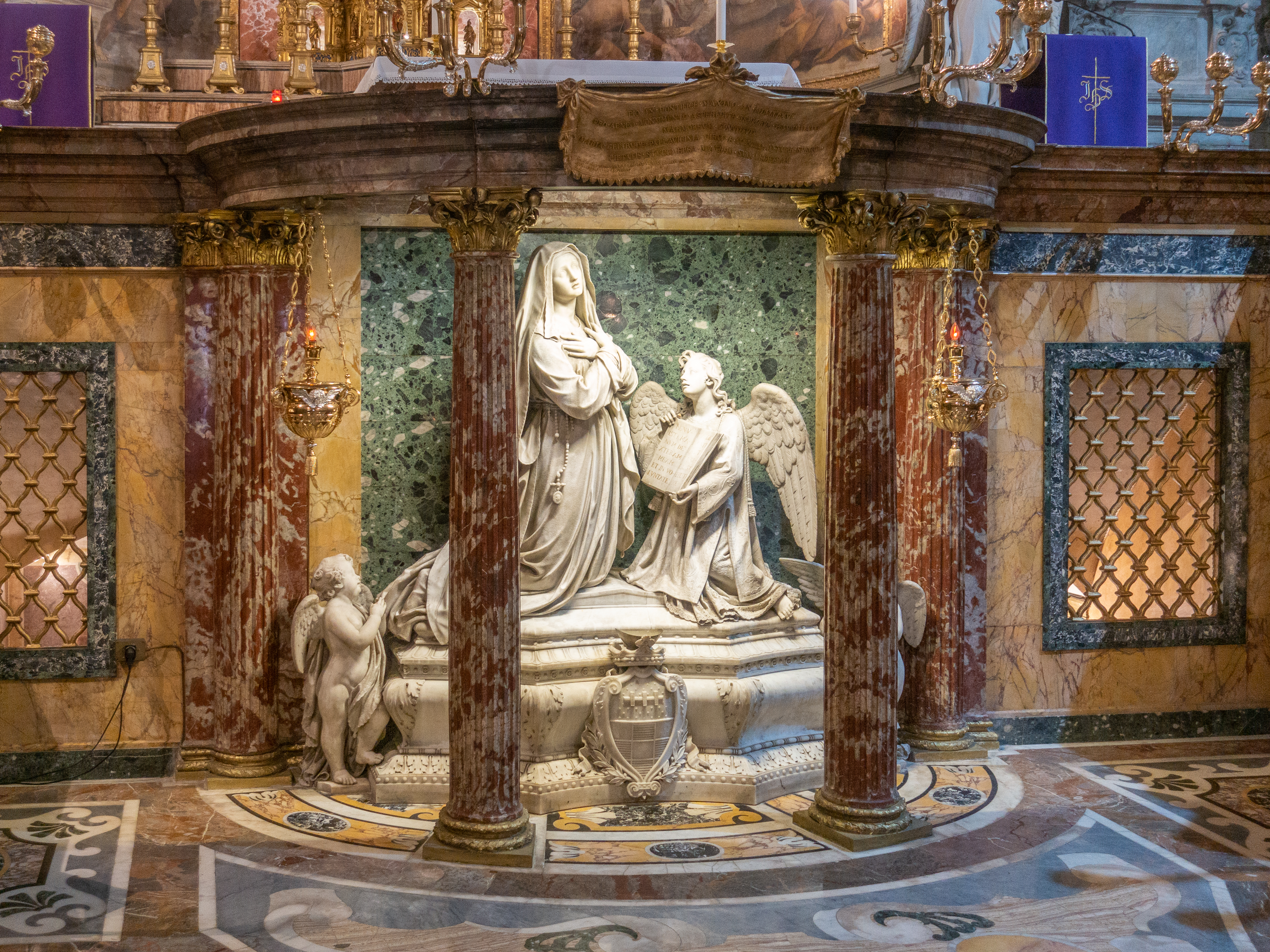
Sculpture by Giosuè Meli (1866)

During a period of forced exile, much of Lorenzo's property and possessions were destroyed. In the course of one occupation of Rome by Neapolitan forces in the early part of the century, he was wounded so severely that he never fully recovered. Frances nursed him throughout the rest of his life.

Frances experienced other sorrows during her marriage to Lorenzo. They lost two children to the plague. Chaos ruled the city during that period of neglect by the pope, and the ongoing warfare between him and the various forces competing for power on the Italian peninsula devastated it. The city of Rome was largely in ruins, and wolves were known to enter the streets. Frances again opened her home as a hospital and drove her wagon through the countryside to collect wood for fire and herbs for medicine. It is said she had the gift of healing, and over 60 cases were attested to during the canonization proceedings.

According to the Catholic Encyclopedia, "With her husband's consent St. Frances practiced continence, and advanced in a life of contemplation. Her visions often assumed the form of drama enacted for her by heavenly personages. She had the gift of miracles and ecstasy, as well as the bodily vision of her guardian angel, had revelations concerning Purgatory and Hell, and foretold the ending of the Western Schism. She could read the secrets of consciences and detect plots of diabolical origin. She was remarkable for her humility and detachment, her obedience and patience".

On 15 August 1425, the feast of the Assumption of Mary, she founded the Olivetan Oblates of Mary, a confraternity of pious women, under the authority of the Olivetan monks of the Abbey of Santa Maria Nova in Rome but neither cloistered nor bound by formal vows, so they could follow her pattern of combining a life of prayer with answering the needs of their society.

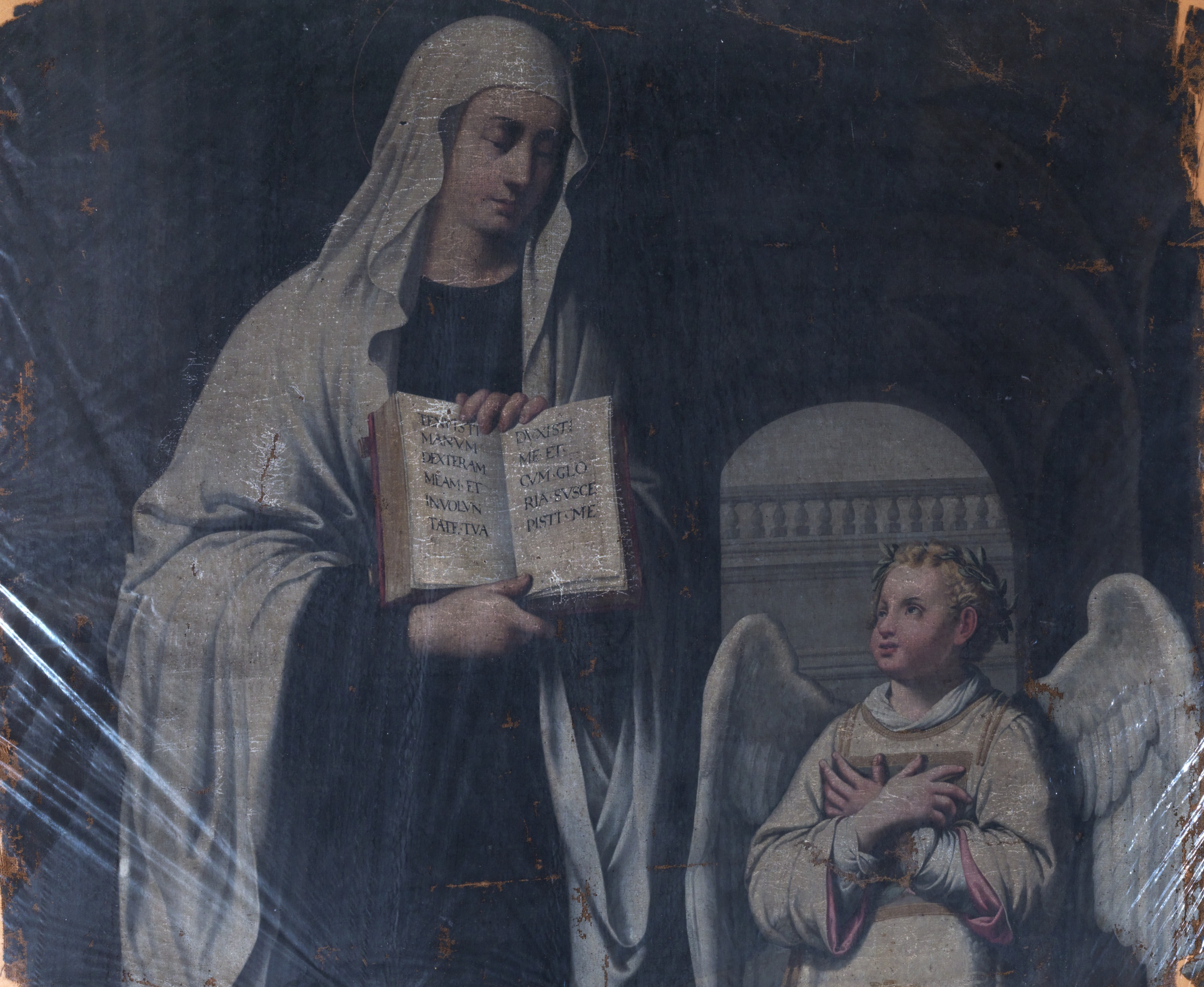
Untitled (St. Francesca Romana), c. 1650

In March 1433, she founded a monastery at Tor de' Specchi, near the Campidoglio, to allow for a common life by those members of the confraternity who felt so-called. This monastery remains the only house of the Institute. On 4 July that year, they received the approval of Pope Eugene IV as a religious congregation of oblates with private religious vows. The community later became known simply as the Oblates of St. Frances of Rome.

Frances herself remained in her own home, nursing her husband for the last seven years of his life from wounds he had received in battle. When he died in 1436, she moved into the monastery and became the superior. She died in 1440 and was buried in Santa Maria Nova.

Frances of Rome accompanied by her guardian angel

== Veneration ==
On 9 May 1608, she was canonized by Pope Paul V, and in the following decades a diligent search was conducted for her remains, which had been hidden during the troubled times in which she lived. Her body was found incorrupt some months after her death. Her grave was identified on 2 April 1638 (only the bones remained), and her remains were reburied in the Church of Santa Maria Nova on 9 March 1649, which has since been her feast day. Again, in 1869, her body was exhumed and has since then been displayed in a glass coffin for the veneration of the faithful. The Church of Santa Maria Nova is now usually referred to as the Church of St. Frances.

=== Patronage ===
In 1925, Pope Pius XI declared her the patron saint of automobile drivers because of a legend that an angel used to light her path with a lantern when she traveled, keeping her safe from hazards. Within the Benedictine Order, she is honored as a patron saint of all oblates. She is also a patron saint of widows.

== See also ==
- Oblates of St. Frances of Rome
- Tor de' Specchi Monastery
- Saint Frances of Rome, patron saint archive
