= Spiritual gift =

In Christianity, an extraordinary power given by the Holy Spirit

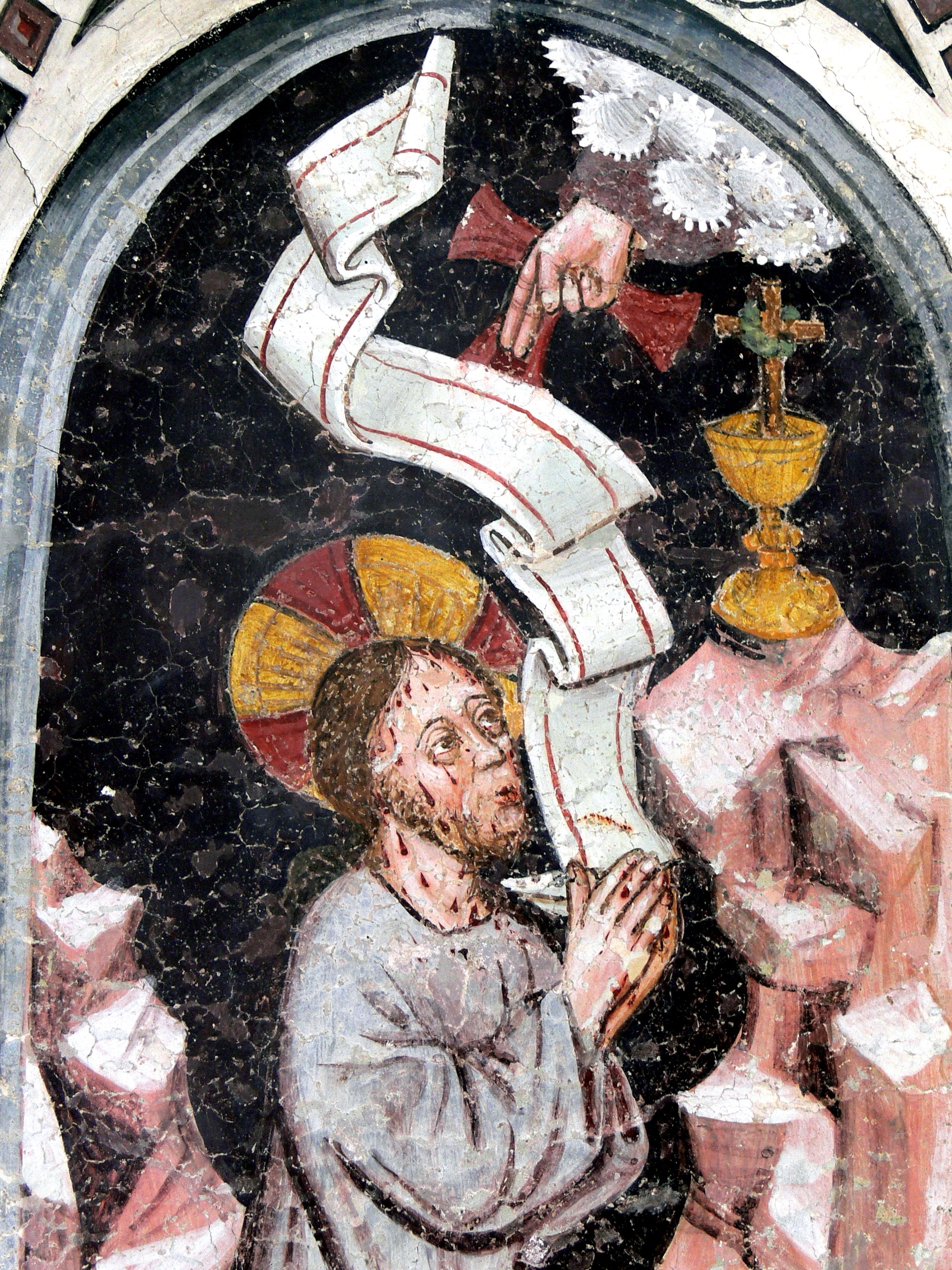
The term charism denotes any good gift that flows from God's benevolent love.

In Christianity, a spiritual gift or charism (plural: charisms or charismata; in Greek singular: χάρισμα charisma, plural: χαρίσματα charismata) is an extraordinary power given by the Holy Spirit. These are believed by followers to be supernatural graces that individual Christians need to fulfill the mission of the Church. In the narrowest sense, it is a theological term for the extraordinary graces given to individual Christians for the good of others and is distinguished from the graces given for personal sanctification, such as the Seven Gifts of the Holy Spirit and the fruit of the Holy Spirit.

These abilities, often termed "charismatic gifts", are the word of knowledge, increased faith, the gifts of healing, the gift of miracles, prophecy, the discernment of spirits, and speaking in tongues. To these are added the gifts of apostles, prophets, teachers, helps (connected to service of the poor and sick), and governments (or leadership ability) which are connected with certain offices in the Church. These gifts are given by the Holy Spirit to individuals, but their purpose is to build up the entire Church. They are described in the New Testament, primarily in 1 Corinthians 12, 13 and 14, Romans 12, and Ephesians 4. 1 Peter 4 also touches on the spiritual gifts.

The gifts are related to both seemingly "natural" abilities and seemingly more "miraculous" abilities, empowered by the Holy Spirit. The two major opposing theological positions on their nature are that they ceased long ago or that they continue, which is the dispute of cessationism versus continuationism.

== Biblical and theological overview ==
The New Testament contains several lists of spiritual gifts, most in the Pauline epistles. While each list is unique, there is overlap.

Romans 12:6–8	1 Corinthians 12:8–10	1 Corinthians 12:28–30	Ephesians 4:11	1 Peter 4:11
1. Prophecy; 2. Serving; 3. Teaching; 4. Exhortation; 5. Giving; 6. Leadership; 7. Mercy	1. Word of wisdom 2. Word of knowledge 3. Faith; 4. Gifts of healings 5. Miracles; 6. Prophecy; 7. Distinguishing between spirits 8. Tongues; 9. Interpretation of tongues	1. Apostle; 2. Prophet; 3. Teacher; 4. Miracles; 5. Kinds of healings 6. Helps; 7. Administration; 8. Tongues	1. Apostle; 2. Prophet; 3. Evangelist; 4. Pastor; 5. Teacher	1. Whoever speaks 2. Whoever renders service

Christians believe that the charismata were foretold in the Book of Joel (2:28) and promised by Christ (Gospel of Mark 16:17–18). This promise was fulfilled on the Day of Pentecost and elsewhere as the church spread. In order to correct abuses concerning the spiritual gifts at Corinth, Paul devoted much attention to spiritual gifts in his First Epistle to the Corinthians (chapters 12–14).

In 1 Corinthians 12, two Greek terms are translated as "spiritual gifts". In verse 1, the word pneumatika ("spirituals" or "things of the Spirit") is used. In verse 4, charisma is used. This word is derived from the word charis, which means "grace". In verses 5 and 6, the words diakonia (translated "administrations", "ministries", or "service") and energemata ("operations" or "inworkings") are used in describing the nature of the spiritual gifts. In verse 7, the term "manifestation (phanerosis) of the Spirit" is used.

From these scriptural passages, Christians understand the spiritual gifts to be enablements or capacities that are divinely bestowed upon individuals. Because they are freely given by God, these cannot be earned or merited. Though worked through individuals, these are operations or manifestations of the Holy Spirit—not of the gifted person. They are to be used for the benefit of others, and in a sense they are granted to the church as a whole more than they are given to individuals. There is diversity in their distribution—an individual will not possess all of the gifts. The purpose of the spiritual gifts is to edify (build up), exhort (encourage), and comfort the church.

It is generally acknowledged that Paul did not list all of the gifts of the Spirit, and many believe that there are as many gifts as there are needs in the body of Christ. The gifts have at times been organized into distinct categories based on their similarities and differences to other gifts. Some divide them into three categories using Old Testament offices. "Prophetic" gifts include any gift involving teaching, encouraging, or rebuking others. "Priestly" gifts include showing mercy and care for the needy or involve intercession before God. "Kingly" gifts are those involving church administration or government. Others categorize them into "gifts of knowledge" (word of wisdom, word of knowledge, distinguishing between spirits), "gifts of speech" (tongues, interpretation, prophecy), and "gifts of power" (faith, healing, miracles). The gifts have also been categorized as those that promote the inner growth of the church (apostle, prophecy, distinguishing between spirits, teaching, word of wisdom/knowledge, helps, and administration) and those that promote the church's outer development (faith, miracles, healing, tongues, interpretation of tongues).

Proponents of cessationism distinguish between the "extraordinary", "miraculous", or "sign" gifts (such as prophecy, tongues, and healing) and the other gifts. Cessationism is held by some Protestants, especially from the Calvinist tradition, who believe that miraculous gifts and their operations were limited to early Christianity and "ceased" afterward. Other Protestants, including Lutheran, Methodist, Pentecostals and charismatics, adhere to the continuationist position, believing that all the spiritual gifts are distributed among Christians by the Holy Spirit and that they are normative in contemporary Christendom. In addition, Roman Catholicism and the Eastern Orthodox Church also continue to believe in and make use of all of the spiritual gifts.

== Descriptions ==
Apostle: The title apostle comes from the Greek word apostolos which means "a messenger, one sent forth with orders". It refers to one who has been delegated authority by another in a foreign land. Apostles were the first leaders of the Church; they were commissioned by Jesus to initiate and direct the preaching of the gospel. While many Christians agree that the title of apostle is reserved for those among the first generation of Christians, many Christian denominations continue in one way or another to recognize a continuing apostolic ministry. Many churches, such as the Roman Catholic Church, Eastern Orthodox Churches, and the Anglican Church believe in the doctrine of apostolic succession, which holds that properly ordained bishops are the successors to the apostles. Only bishops have the charism certain of the truth (in Latin: charisma veritatis certum), which is the faculty to establish undoubtedly a truth in matter of faith or morality or concerning the Holy Scripture. Other Christian groups, such as classical Pentecostals, consider the role of a missionary to be fulfilling an apostolic ministry. There are some Christians, however, who advocate restoring the Fivefold ministry, including the formal recognition of the office of apostle. Others would say that the office no longer exists.

Prophet: In the New Testament, the office of prophet is to equip the saints for the work of service through exhortation, edification, and consolation (1 Corinthians 12:28; 1 Corinthians 14:3 Ephesians 4:11). The prophet's corresponding gift is prophecy. Prophecy is "reporting something that God spontaneously brings to your mind". Many, particularly Pentecostals and charismatics, distinguish between the "office of prophet" and the "gift of prophecy", believing that a Christian can possess the gift of prophecy without holding the prophetic office.

Prophecy has been addressed to the human understanding “he who prophesies speaks to men,” Cor 14:1-25. The prophet “edifies the church” (14:4).

Evangelist: An evangelist is one who devotes himself to preaching the gospel. In the New Testament, evangelists preached from city to city, church to church.

Pastor: This term derives from a Greek word for "shepherd". In theory pastors are gifted to lead, guide, and set an example for other Christians. The grammatical structure of Ephesians 4:11 leads many to conclude that teacher and pastor should be considered one term (pastor-teacher). Even so, the two terms are not interchangeable; while all pastors are teachers, not all teachers are pastors. Pastoral Gifts include integrity and compassion.

Teacher: Someone who devotes his or her life to preaching and teaching the Christian faith. When teaching is provided for the Church by God, two gifts are actually given—to the Church is given a teacher and along with the teacher comes a divine capacity to teach.

Service: The word translated as "ministry" is diakonia, which can also be translated "service". Since there are many types of ministries and service to the Church, this then describes a broad array of gifts rather than a single gift.

Exhortation: The ability to motivate Christians "to patient endurance, brotherly love, and good works".

Giving: People with this gift carry extraordinary generosity. While all Christians should be givers, those possessing this gift will go beyond normal giving.

Leading: This gift speaks to the various leadership roles found in the Church. While many think of roles such as administration, management of funds, strategy planning, etc. as functions outside of the supernatural realm, in reality individuals in these positions are just as in need of supernatural empowerment as are ministers of the gospel. Some writers consider the gifts of governments and leading to be the same gift, but others consider them closely related yet different.

Mercy: Possibly identical to the gift of helps, the mercy-shower possesses a ministry of visitation, prayer, and compassion to the poor and sick.

Word of wisdom: An utterance or message of wisdom supernaturally granted to an individual. For Paul, wisdom refers to "the knowledge of the great Christian mysteries: the Incarnation, Passion, and Resurrection of Christ, and the indwelling in the believer of the Spirit of God (1 Corinthians 2; Ephesians 1:17)".

Word of knowledge: The knowledge referred to is often said to relate to understanding Christian doctrine or scriptural truth. It is sometimes said to be connected with the ministry of teachers.

Faith: This refers to that strong or special faith "which removes mountains, casts out devils (Matthew 17:19–20), and faces the most cruel martyrdom without flinching". It is distinguished from the "saving" and "normal" Christian faith.

Gifts of healings: The ability to supernaturally minister healing to others. The plural indicates the variety of sickness healed and the many forms the gift takes, such as healing by anointing with oil, by the laying on of hands, by saying the name of Jesus or by the sign of the cross.

Working of miracles: The performance of deeds beyond ordinary human ability by the power of the Holy Spirit.

Visions. An outpouring of this gift is prophesied in Joel 2:28 and Acts 2:17 shows that early Christians believed this prophecy was fulfilled on the day of Pentecost. Visions tend to be more private experiences than the other gifts. Some researchers expand the definition of visions to include a strongly felt presence.

Discerning of spirits: The capacity to discern, distinguish, or to discriminate the source of a spiritual manifestation—whether it emanates from a good or evil spirit. It seemed to have been particularly associated with prophecy as it would be necessary to know whether a prophetic utterance was truly inspired by God.

Tongues: The supernatural ability of speaking an unlearned language. Paul seems to have distinguished between the public use of the gift (which must always be interpreted) and the private use which was for the spiritual strengthening of oneself. Currently among Christians there is a dispute as to whether tongues were/are always xenoglossy (speaking an unlearned human language) or whether it also included/includes glossolalia (speaking an unlearned and allegedly non-human language of heavenly or angelic origin).

Interpretation of tongues: This gift ought always follow the public exercise of the gift of tongues. In 1 Corinthians 14, the Apostle Paul required that all speech in Christian worship should be intelligible. This required that speech given in an unknown tongue be interpreted in the common language of the gathered Christians.

Helps: This gift has to do with service to the sick and the poor. Possessors of this gift have a "spiritual burden and a God-given love for the needy and afflicted".

Administration: Also called the gift of governing, the Greek word translated "governments" is kubernesis, the verb form of which means "to steer" or "to be a helmsman". This gift then refers to the God-given capacity to lead or guide the Church through storms and difficult seas.

== Other spiritual gifts ==
While not specifically defined as spiritual gifts in the Bible, other abilities and capacities have been considered as spiritual gifts by some Christians. Some are found in the New Testament such as:

- celibacy (1 Corinthians 7:7)
- fellowship
- hospitality (1 Peter 4:9–10)
- intercession (Romans 8:26–27)
- marriage (1 Corinthians 7:7)
- (effective) witnessing (Acts 1:8, 5:32, 26:22, 1 John 5:6)

Others are found in the Old Testament such as:

- craftsmanship (such as the special abilities given to artisans who constructed the Tabernacle in Exodus 35:30–33)
- interpretation of dreams (e.g. Joseph and Daniel) in Genesis 43-50, Daniel 2
- composing spiritual music, poetry, and prose

== Social meaning ==
The word is also used in secular circumstances within social psychology. In that context, charism is defined as personal influence on other people individually or as a group.

Religious orders (including Anglican, Catholic, Lutheran and Methodist) use the word "charism" to describe their spiritual orientation and any special characteristics of their mission or values that might be exhibited as a result of the vows that they have taken, the intention of their founder, or the orientation of the order to which they belong. An example might be the works of a teaching order compared to that of a missionary order or one devoted to the care of the poor or the sick and those in need of help: thus the charism of Saint Joseph's Missionary Society of Mill Hill is "to go where the need is greatest".

== See also ==
- Charisma
- Charismatic Christianity
- Charity (virtue)
- Gift of miracles
- Chaplet in Honour of the Holy Spirit and His Seven Gifts
