= Sant'Andrea in Vincis =

Former church in Rome, Italy

Coordinates: 41.8928°N 12.4806°E

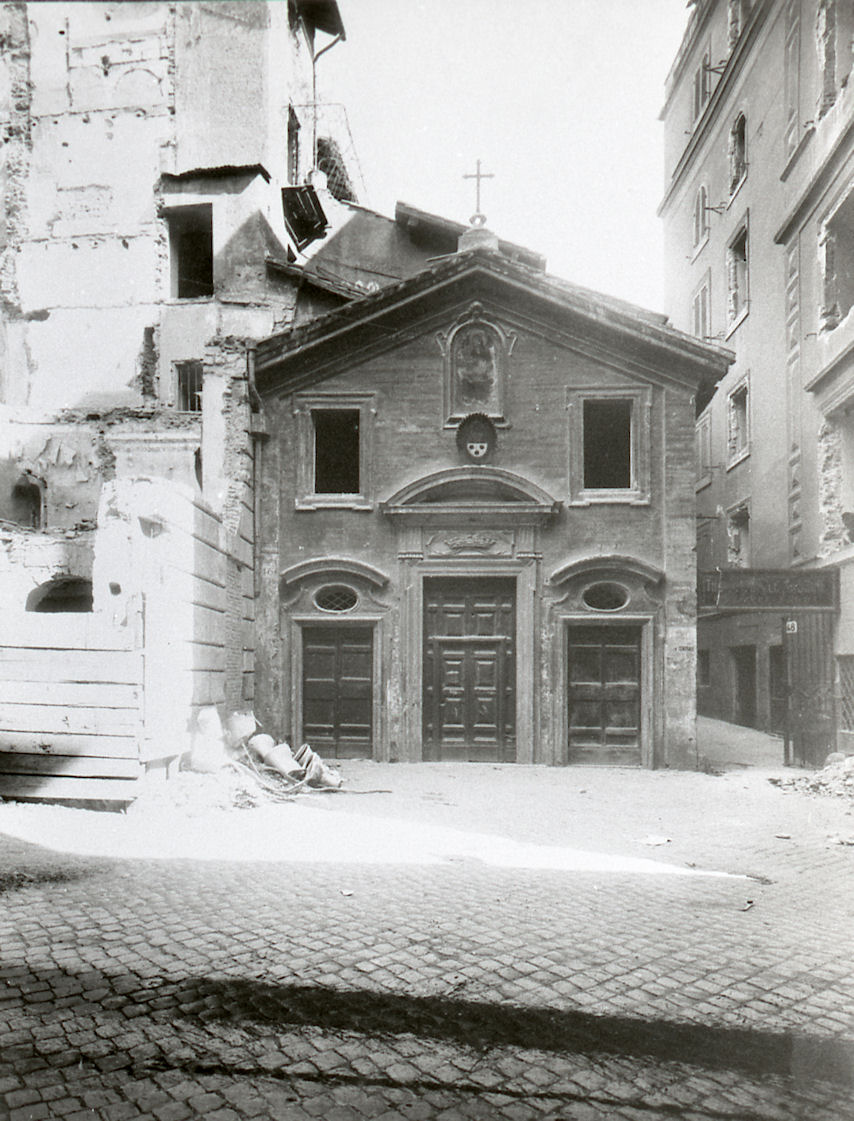
Church facade in 1920s

Sant’Andrea in Vincis was a small Roman Catholic church located near the Franciscan convent of Tor de' Specchi, on the western slopes of the Campidoglio, in the rione Campitelli of Rome, Italy. The church was torn down in the late 1920s to make space for the Via del Teatro de Marcello.

Melchiorri describes this as the church of the Confraternity of the Scalpellini (marble workers), and mentions it was called either Sant'Andrea in Mentuccia or in Vinchis. The Scalpellini obtained this church under Pope Innocent VII, and refurbished the church under Carlo de Marchis. The ceiling of the church was frescoed by Antonio Nessi, a pupil of Sebastiano Conca.
