= Gift of miracles =

Christian theological concept

In Christian theology, the gift of miracles is among the spiritual gifts (charismata) mentioned by St. Paul in his First Epistle to the Corinthians. As a charism, the gift is imparted to certain individuals through the power of the Holy Spirit.

The view of Cessationism held that the charismata were exclusively for Apostolic times, and therefore the gift of miracles ceased with the writing of the last book of the Bible or the death of St. John the Apostle.

In Continuationism, on the other hand, spiritual gifts are held to be possible throughout the history of Christianity, and still exists in the present day.

== Catholicism ==
In Catholicism, the gift of miracles is an extraordinary act of divine grace through intercessions of the Holy Spirit. This extraordinary act is imparted to certain individuals so that Christ's doctrine may become credible, and Christians can be renewed in their faith. The work of miracles is ultimately the work of God, however Saint Michael the Archangel and the angels of God are also believed to perform miracles in a threefold manner, on behalf of the Holy Trinity.

Roman Catholic priests and bishops help to administer this act by;

- Divine prayer invoking a miraculous effect such as the Suffrage Mass;
- Disposition or accommodating the materials, as it is said of the angels in the Resurrection of the flesh that they will collect the dust of bodily remains, that these bodies may be re-animated and resurrected. (cf. John 5,29);
- Performing some other act in co-operation with the divine mercy, as in the case of the application of relics, or by visit to holy places which God has designated for extraordinary favours of this kind.

Like other charismata, these are special and extraordinary powers vouchsafed by God only to a few, and primarily for the spiritual good of others, rather than of the recipient.

The gift of thaumaturgy deals with the miracles of Jesus and the transmission of divine grace through Apostolic succession. In the same manner, Roman Catholic priests and Bishops administer the sacrament of the Anointing of the sick by imposition of their hands with the holy chrism. (cf. Mark 6,13Mark 16,18).

The related liturgy is regulated within the Ordo Unctionis Infirmorum eorumque Pastoralis Curae and the De Benedictionibus of the Roman Ritual. The sacrament does not promise healing (to be related to James 5:14–15.).

Moreover, the intercession of saints may mediate the divine grace of a miracle through devotional prayer and of pious practices such as works of mercy.

== Pentecostals and Charismatics ==
In Pentecostal and Charismatic Christianity, it is believed that God continues to utilize this gift through believers with the gift of faith and through the power of the Holy Spirit. This gift does not, however, make one a miracle worker, since it is God who performs the miracle. The emphasis should be known that it is a spiritual gift from God, primarily for the ministry and spiritual good of others, rather than the recipient. God always signifies or teaches something with miraculous manifestations.

== See also ==
- Thaumaturgy
