= Cessationism versus continuationism =

Christian theological dispute

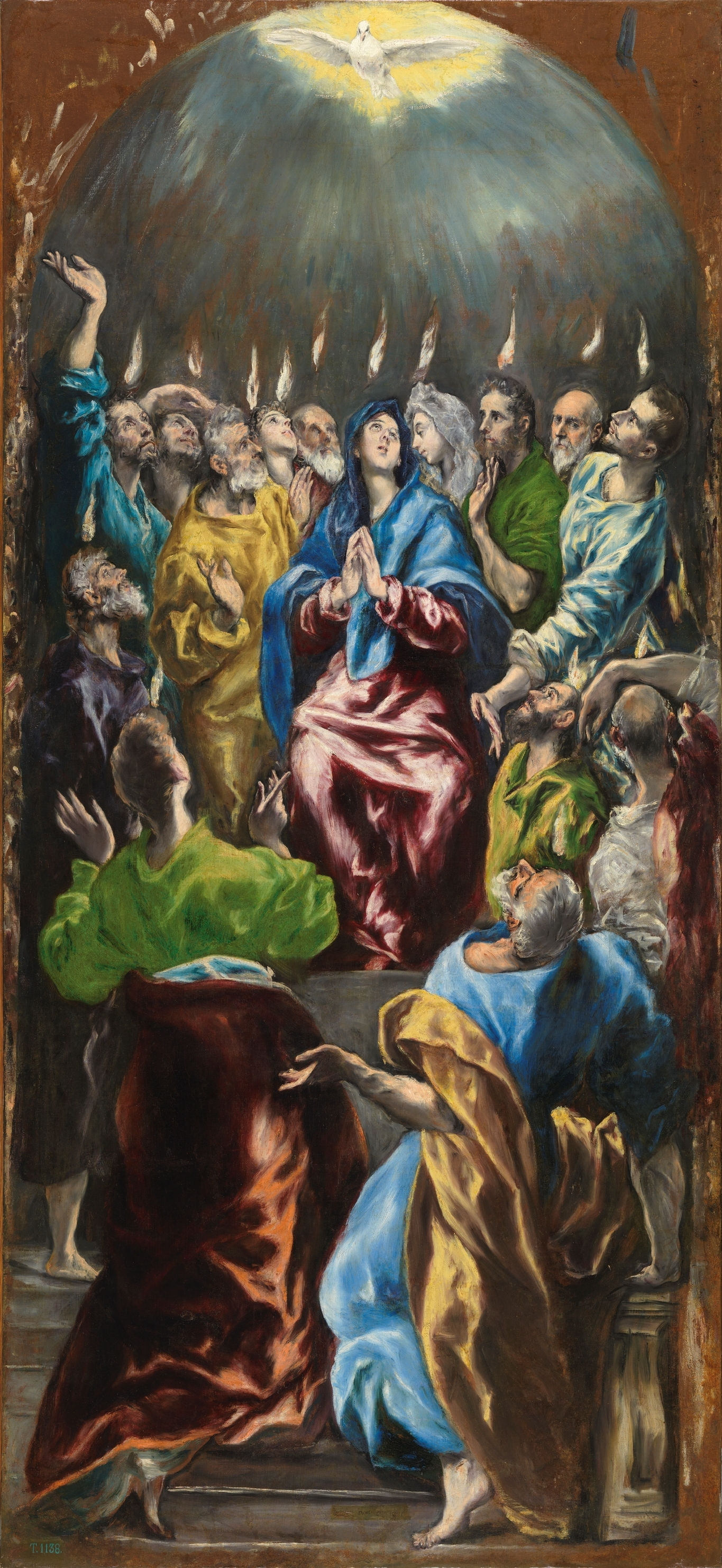
El Greco's depiction of Pentecost, with tongues of fire and a dove representing the Holy Spirit's descent (c. 1600)

Cessationism versus continuationism involves a Christian theological dispute as to whether spiritual gifts remain available to the church, or whether their operation ceased with the apostolic age of the church (or soon thereafter). The cessationist doctrine arose in the Reformed theology: initially in response to claims of Roman Catholic miracles. Modern discussions focus more on the use of spiritual gifts in the Pentecostal and Charismatic movements, though this emphasis has been taught in traditions that arose earlier, such as Methodism.

Cessationism is a doctrine that spiritual gifts such as speaking in tongues, prophecy, and healing ceased with the apostolic age. The doctrine was developed in the Reformation and is particularly associated with the Calvinists. More recent development has tended to focus on other spiritual gifts, too, owing to the advent of Pentecostalism and the Charismatic movement that have popularised continuationism, the position that the spiritual gifts are meant for all Christians in every age.

Continuationism is a Christian theological belief that the gifts of the Holy Spirit, the spiritual gifts, have continued to the present age. Continuationism as a distinct theological position arose in opposition to cessationism, and is often manifested in advocacy of the recovery of spiritual gifts in the Church today, but also encompasses any tradition that does not argue the gifts have necessarily ceased.

== Differing views ==
Despite being three broad camps, divided over a single question, there is a spectrum of views that fall under three broad headings:

- Cessationism – a common view within the Reformed traditions and the dispensational segment of evangelicalism.
- Open (that is, continuationist) but cautious.
- Pentecostal/Charismatic/Third Wave – Classic Pentecostal denominations along with groups, mainly within Catholicism, that trace their origin to the charismatic renewal movement of the 1960s and 1970s. "Third wave" refers to the 1980s renewal movement, as coined by C. Peter Wagner.

Cessationist arguments may focus on the principle of whether spiritual gifts (Apostolic) are available to the church at all, or they may focus on whether the gifts found in modern charismatic forms of Christianity are authentic. These arguments need to be considered separately, because in one case the "open but cautious" continuationists may be deemed to be on one side, and on the other side in the other instance.

For example, if the cessationist position is correct that spiritual gifts are not available in the modern age, this position would be in opposition to the "open, but cautious" continuationists. On the other hand, "open but cautious" continuationists may agree with cessationist arguments against many aspects of the Pentecostal and Charismatic movements.

Historically, the Catholic, Methodist, Moravian, and Pentecostal traditions of Christianity have preached continuationism while Dispensationalist Baptist, the confessional Reformed and Presbyterian, and much of the Anglican traditions have been cessationist. Lutherans have held to a middle position, "open but cautious" continuationism, that views the full range of spiritual gifts as not given exclusively through the medium of the first-century canonical apostles, but also not necessarily promised in every place and time in church history.

== Cessationism ==
Cessationism is, generally speaking, a doctrine of Reformed Christianity. Prior to the Protestant Reformation, there was no such explicit doctrine, yet neither was there an expectation that most of the gifts of the Holy Spirit would persist in the Church in the day-to-day experience of Christians. Nevertheless, there were sporadic mentions of some gifts, such as speaking in tongues, and more frequently, but still unusually, of healings and miracles. It was when these miracles in the Catholic Church were used as a polemic against the post-Reformation Protestant churches that John Calvin began to develop a doctrine of cessationism, and it was primarily in the Calvinist tradition that this doctrine was developed. The argument was that as the gifts of the Spirit must have necessarily ceased at the end of the Apostolic Age, it followed that the claims of miracles and healings should be met with skepticism and could not be used by believers to determine God's favour.

As one Reformed theologian says, "John Calvin speaks of miracles as 'seals' added to the Word of God, and he warns that miracles must never be separated from the Word. When connected to the Word of God, miracles serve 'to prepare us for faith, or to confirm us in faith.' But when miracles are divorced from God's Word, they "bring glory to creatures and not God.'"

Although initial statements of this doctrine held that the miracles and gifts of the Spirit ended with the Apostolic Age, this was soon modified to a view that the gifts faded away over the first three centuries of the Church. Writing in 1918, Benjamin Warfield, a Presbyterian theologian, reasserted the view that the gifts ceased with the death of the last of the apostles, arguing that only the apostles could confer the gifts upon other Christians. With the advent of Pentecostalism, the focus of this doctrine moved away from Catholicism and towards claims of the emergence of spiritual gifts within Protestant groups.

=== Types of cessationism ===
The doctrine of cessationism has evolved into various forms since its initial formulation. One disagreement between cessationists is the point when the gifts ceased—either with the deaths of the apostles, or gradually over the first few centuries. If the gifts are only imparted through the laying on of hands by the apostles, as Warfield argues, then the gifts necessarily ended with the death of the last apostle. One writer categorises such a priori beliefs as principled cessationism, but recognises that an a posteriori, or empirical, cessationism is also possible. Empirical cessationism asserts that the gifts were lost through the church's supposed deviation from sound doctrine, and not because they must necessarily have ended. The author quotes a study published by cessationists Brian and Scott McPherson to illustrate the empirical cessationist position.

Although the original formulation of cessationism arose in response to claims of healing and miracles in the Catholic Church, cessationists now divide into four viewpoints based on their views about the possibility of miracles among Christians today. These are:

- Full cessationists believe that all miracles have ceased, along with any miraculous gifts.
- Classical cessationists assert that the miraculous gifts such as prophecy, healing, and speaking in tongues ceased with the apostles. However, they do believe that God occasionally works in supernatural ways today.
- Consistent cessationists believe that not only were the miraculous gifts only for the establishment of the first-century church, but the need for apostles and prophets also ceased.
- Concentric cessationists believe that the miraculous gifts have indeed ceased in the mainstream church and evangelised areas, but may appear in unreached areas as an aid to spreading the Gospel. Daniel B. Wallace describes himself as a concentric cessationist and describes the other cessationist viewpoints as "linear".

== Continuationism ==
Continuationism is a distinct theological position that arose in opposition to cessationism. "Spijkman points out that the denial of miracles is often based on a deistic dualism which sees God and the world as independent, entities. For Deists the only time God intervened in the affairs of the world was at creation, when God set in motion the laws that now govern the world. For strong cessationists the time of God's direct intervention in world affairs is limited to the period before the closure of the canon. Since that time God is seen as working only through the structures set in place. This is a far cry from the biblical picture of a living God, who not only upholds the world day by day through his sovereign power. but who also listens to the prayers of his people, and works all things for the good of those who love him (Rom. 8:28)." "He who sees the miracles of Holy Scripture inseparably connected with the saving and redeeming activity of God knows that there can be no talk of a decrease or diminishing of the power of God unto salvation in this world. ... There is not a single datum in the New Testament which makes it certain that God, in a new period of strengthening and extending of the Church in heathendom, will not confirm this message with signs, in holy resistance to the demonic influences of the kingdom of darkness."

Historically, it was within Calvinism that modern doctrines of cessationism were first formulated. The early Church, Orthodox Catholic churches, and later schism of the Roman Catholic Church and most other wings of Protestantism were never cessationist by doctrine. However, it would take the emergence of early holiness Pentecostalism to crystallise a theological position of continuationism as it would be understood today.

Since the doctrine of continuationism is understood to mean that the gifts of the Holy Spirit, including miracles and healing, did not cease in the Apostolic Age, then continuationism was the settled view of the whole Christian church until the time of the Reformation. Nevertheless, even though there was no doctrine of cessationism made before this time, such gifts were not expected as a norm. For instance, Augustine, writing in the early fifth century, commented that speaking in tongues was a miracle that was no longer evident in his own time. He spoke of miracles still occurring at the time but noted in The City of God that they were not as spectacular or noteworthy as those in the Apostolic Age.

The Protestant Reformation saw the birth of a doctrine of cessationism, especially within Calvinism, that sought to deny that the gifts of the Holy Spirit persisted beyond the Apostolic Age. This position was motivated by the polemical use of Catholic miracle stories in opposition to Protestantism. However, continuationism remained the position, not just in the Roman Catholic church, but also in most Anglican churches, initially in Lutheran churches, the Moravian Church, and in later movements such as Methodism.

Accounts of spiritual gifts can be found throughout history, but it was not until the advent of Pentecostalism and the later Charismatic movement that large numbers of Christians began to adhere to a radical continuationism, arguing that the gifts of the Holy Spirit are meant to be experienced by all Christians in every age. Focus moved from Catholic accounts of miracles to other gifts such as speaking in tongues. Continuationists argue that there is no reason to maintain that the gifts of the Holy Spirit have ceased, regardless of whether they believe that said gifts should be expected in the modern church or not.

== History ==
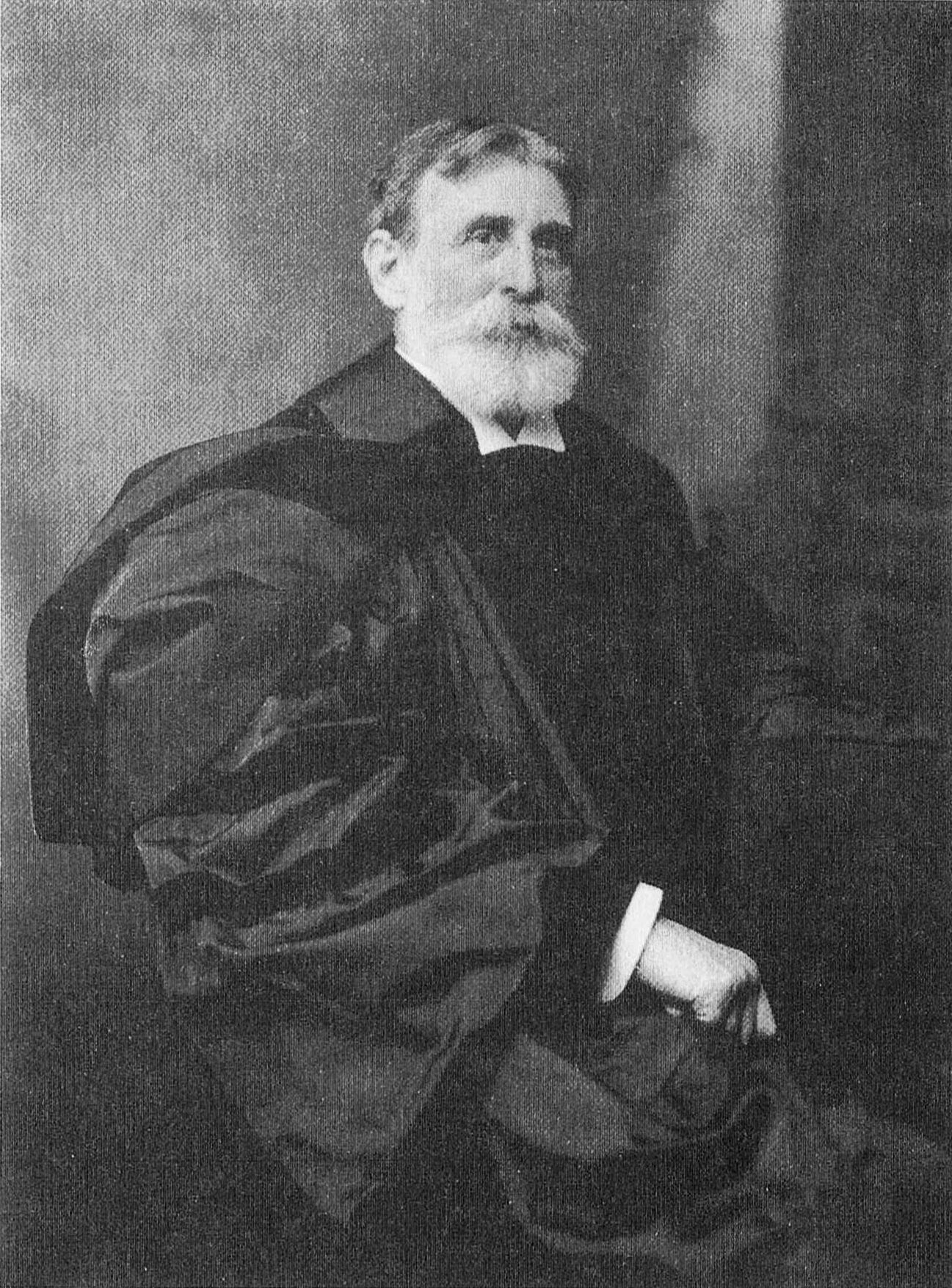
B. B. Warfield's book Counterfeit Miracles was a major statement of the cessationist position.

The question of the use of spiritual gifts has been a theme throughout the history of Christianity. There was discussion of the prevalence of miracles and spiritual gifts in the Church, and many references can be found in the writings of the Church Fathers and others, that are cited by Christians on each side of this debate.

=== Early Christianity (100–500) ===
- Justin Martyr (d.165) in his Dialogue with Trypho comments, 'For the prophetical gifts remain with us, even to the present time.'
- Irenaeus (d.202) was a pupil of Polycarp, who was a disciple of the apostle John. He wrote in his book Against Heresies, Book V, vi.: "In like manner do we also hear many brethren in the church who possess prophetic gifts, and who through the Spirit speak all kinds of languages, and bring to light, for the general benefit, the hidden things of men and declare the mysteries of God, who also the apostles term spiritual".
  "Those who are in truth His disciples, receiving grace from Him, do in His name perform [miracles], so as to promote the welfare of other men, according to the gift which each one has received from Him. For some do certainly and truly drive out devils, so that those who have thus been cleansed from evil spirits frequently both believe [in Christ], and join themselves to the Church. Others have foreknowledge of things to come: they see visions, and utter prophetic expressions. Others still, heal the sick by laying their hands upon them, and they are made whole. Yea, moreover, as I have said, the dead even have been raised up, and remained among us for many years…. The name of our Lord Jesus Christ even now confers benefits [upon men], and cures thoroughly and effectively all who anywhere believe on Him".
- Origen (AD 185–253). He professed to have been an eye-witness to many instances of exorcism, healing, and prophecy, although he refused to record the details, lest he should rouse the laughter and scorn of the unbeliever.
- Chrysostom (d.407) – writing on 1 Corinthians and the gift of tongues said, "This whole place is very obscure; but the obscurity is produced by our ignorance of the facts referred to and by their cessation, being such as then used to occur but now no longer take place. And why do they not happen now? Why look now, the cause too of the obscurity hath produced us again another question: namely, why did they then happen, and now do so no more?". (AD 347–407)
- Augustine (d.430) – In a homily on the 1st Epistle of John, Augustine commented that speaking in tongues was a miracle suitable for the early church, but that it was no longer evident in his own time. In chapters 8 and 9 of Book XXII of his City of God, written circa AD 415, Augustine noted that miracles in his day were not as spectacular or noteworthy as those at the dawn of Christianity, but that they continued to take place.

=== Reformation ===
During the Reformation the Catholic church used accounts of miracles in the Catholic church as a polemic against the Reformed churches. John Calvin wrote in a preface to his Institutes of the Christian Religion that the primary purpose of miracles was to confirm divine revelation and affirm the Church's doctrine. It was a proof that the Apostolic preaching was true. Because the Reformation reaffirmed the original Apostolic preaching, no additional miracles should be expected – and that was likewise true of all Apostolic churches, which led Calvin to argue that the miracles of the Catholic church were necessarily false. This was the first formulation of a cessationist argument: that the miracles and healings of the church should not be expected, because divine revelation had already been confirmed and the foundation laid.

=== 18th–21st centuries ===
The rise of Methodism in the 18th century emphasised "pursuing the ordinary work of the Spirit" and followers "experienced all types of charisms and spiritual manifestations." Methodism (inclusive of the holiness movement) affirms the possibility of entire sanctification as a second work of grace, which it teaches is the baptism of the Holy Spirit. Wesleyan-Arminian theology affirms the doctrine of the Witness of the Spirit, which assures the believer of his faith.

In the 1830s–1850s, the Shakers, an offshoot of the Quakers, had a spiritual revival in the United States known as the Era of Manifestations. This period involved the expression of spiritual gifts, such as visions, revelation and ecstatic experiences. Prior to this revival, Quakers believed that everyone had access to the Inward light, which was often connected to the gifts and Fruit of the Holy Spirit, such as the "Word of Wisdom." Personal use of the Inward light was further emphasized by American Quaker minister Elias Hicks in the 1840s and led to the "Hicksite" (Liberal) branch of Quakerism.

=== 20th–21st centuries ===
B.B. Warfield was a major proponent of Cessationism in the early 20th century. Warfield expounded his views on cessationism particularly in his 1918 work, Counterfeit Miracles. His view was that the goal of the charismata was to accredit true doctrine and its bearers, and that miracles were limited to the Biblical era. Miracles are seen as proving doctrine and once the canon was sealed and the last apostles died, they were not needed. Warfield was highly influenced by the work of John Calvin.

A second major influence to Warfield was the Enlightenment epistemology of Scottish Common Sense philosophy. Warfield's Calvinist roots objected to Roman Catholicism and Enlightenment-era Scottish Common Sense philosophy realism that challenged post-Biblical ecclesiastical miracles. The writing of Conyers Middleton, who John Wesley objected to, was taken by Warfield as his own. Middleton's (and Warfield's) historical methodology towards miracles is outlined as follows:

1. Miracles are of such a nature and performed in such a manner as would necessarily inject suspicion of fraud and delusion.
2. The cures and beneficial effects of miracles were either false, imaginary, or accidental.
3. Miracles tend to confirm the idlest of all errors and superstitions.
4. The integrity of witnesses to miracles is either highly questionable or their credulity renders them unworthy of any credit.
5. Some miracles are so trifling as to excite nothing but contempt.

Warfield used a two-leg approach in his defense of cessationism in which he attempted to perform a critical analysis based on a 'historical leg' and a 'scriptural leg'.

In his fight against liberals who rationalised and de-mythologised or allegorised New Testament miracles, Warfield had a faith-oriented, super-naturalistic and subjective position. However, critics have argued that Warfield took a common-sense, naturalistic, objective and scientific approach to post-Biblical miracles. Randy Clark said that in Warfield's attempt to protect Christian orthodoxy against the errors of liberalism and rationalism, his own biases blinded him from the reality of the New Covenant Spirit in the post-Biblical era.

Against this cessationist view, Karl Barth, the main exponent of what came to be known as neo-orthodoxy within non-fundamentalist Protestantism, declared, "It is assumed that the church at all times needs the witness of apostles and prophets; further, Paul does not anticipate that the inspired and enthusiastic ministry was to be absorbed by and disappear into offices and officers".

In Jon Ruthven's On the Cessation of the Charismata and What's Wrong With Protestant Theology? the author contends for the continuation position and argues that Warfield's defense of cessationism was to defend fundamentalism and Calvinism against the growing theological liberalism of the late 19th century. Ruthven agreed with Warfield's premise that the function of the charismata determines its duration based on the emphasis of Scripture. Scripture explicitly states, Ruthven opined, that the function of the charismata is not for the accreditation of apostles and true doctrine, but for the edification, exhortation, encouragement and equipping of all believers for further service.

Later, Pentecostalism along with the charismatic movement in historic Christian Churches taught a baptism of the Holy Spirit (though different than the Methodist doctrine) accompanied by glossolalia. Holiness Pentecostals, who started the movement, taught that it was the third work of grace. Fundamental to the charismatic movement that arose in historic Christian Churches is the experience of baptism with the Holy Spirit and the use of spiritual gifts (charismata).

== Problems of terminology ==
Key concepts are understood differently by the sides. For instance, regarding the ministry of a prophet, the question emerges whether everyone who prophesies can thus be deemed a prophet.

Certain cessationists interpret some of the charismatic gifts, such as 'prophecy,' 'the word of knowledge', 'the gift of faith' in natural terms, while others attach a supernatural character to all charismatic gifts.

Some cessationists, such as Peter Masters, have questioned whether the gifts of the spirit as found in the Church today are the same as the gifts as found in the first-century church. Masters argues that all uses of the gift of tongues in the New Testament were natural languages that were understood by other people present.

== Points of dispute ==
Arguments against modern Charismatic and Pentecostal practice are not, in themselves, arguments for cessationism. Many "open but cautious" continuationists would make the same arguments. To qualify as an argument for cessationism, an argument must make the case that the gifts of the spirit are not available to the church today under any circumstance. This may be an argument that the gifts were irrevocably lost, or it may be an argument that the gifts were withdrawn or meant to be temporary. Those are the only points of dispute. These arguments are as follows:

=== The foundation of prophets and apostles ===
The main arguments of cessationism are that the gifts of the Holy Spirit were only given for the foundation of the church. For instance, Masters states that the purpose of the gifts was to confirm the apostolic ministry with miraculous signs, until such a time as the biblical text was completed by the apostles and prophets. B. B. Warfield went further and argued that the gifts of the Holy Spirit were only conferred by the laying on of hands of the Apostles, and since the Apostles have all died, that the gifts too have ceased to exist.

My conclusion then is, that the power of working miracles was not extended beyond the disciples upon whom the Apostles conferred it by the imposition of their hands. As the number of these disciples gradually diminished, the instances of the exercise of miraculous powers became continually less frequent, and ceased entirely at the death of the last individual on whom the hands of the Apostles had been laid.

Several responses can be made to Warfield's argument. Firstly, Warfield's argument that the gifts can only be imparted by the laying on of the hands of apostles is an argument from silence. Warfield argues that all cases of impartation of miracle-working powers come from the laying on of hands of the apostles, but in many cases, the Bible does not tell us who prayed for whom to impart the gifts or the Holy Spirit, and it should thus be no surprise that the apostles are recorded as doing so in the book of the Acts of the Apostles. Moreover, Ruthven points out that Ananias, not himself an apostle, prayed for Paul with the laying on of hands in Acts 9:17. Ruthven writes:

To preserve his thesis, without any biblical evidence whatsoever, Warfield insists that Paul’s miracle-working power was "original with him as an Apostle, and not conferred by anyone".

Secondly, if the office of apostle never ceased, then Warfield's argument fails for that reason too. Ruthven, among others, argues that the belief that the gift of apostleship was limited to the 12 apostles plus Paul is itself a post-Reformation doctrine that needs re-evaluation, and he lists nine arguments as to why apostleship continues within the church. However, as he notes, this is not the view of all continuationists. For instance, Ruthven notes that Dan Carson argues that the gift of apostleship alone is time-limited.

=== Exegesis of 1 Corinthians 13:8–12 ===
A scriptural argument for cessationism is made regarding a passage in Paul's letter to the Corinthians. In a chapter sandwiched between two chapters discussing spiritual gifts, Paul wrote a passage all about love, which contains the following verses:

Charity never faileth: but whether there be prophecies, they shall fail; whether there be tongues, they shall cease; whether there be knowledge, it shall vanish away. For we know in part, and we prophesy in part. But when that which is perfect is come, then that which is in part shall be done away. When I was a child, I spake as a child, I understood as a child, I thought as a child: but when I became a man, I put away childish things. For now we see through a glass, darkly; but then face to face: now I know in part; but then shall I know even as also I am known.

— King James Version

The principal reason for the cessationist denial of the continuation of the gifts is their appeal to the closure of the canon of scripture (that is, the completion of the Bible). Implicit in their appeal is their understanding that the closure of the canon marked the end of the manifestation of spiritual gifts. However, the main continuationist objection is that the Bible does not offer any clear (explicit) text that would support cessationism. Some cessationists, such as Robert L. Thomas and Walter J. Chantry, appeal to the text of 1 Corinthians 13:8–12 as a proof-text for cessationism. Therefore, the question is how both camps in the dispute understand 1 Corinthians 13:8–12. In this context, the issue is how to interpret the expression in v. 10, "when that which is perfect is come," which speaks about an event associated with the cessation of the gifts.

Continuationists understand the expression "that which is perfect to come" as referring to either the death of the Christian or else to the Second Coming of Christ. Thus, the timing of the cessation of the gifts is associated with the resurrection from the dead and the eschatological event of Christ's return. An argument for such interpretation is that human knowledge, v. 9, is in a state of imperfection ("in part") because "that which is perfect" has not yet come, but when it does come, the believer's knowledge will cease to be imperfect ("which is in part shall be done away"). Since the event of Christ's Second Coming will bring forth the completion of the believer's knowledge, Dan Carson, among others, argues that Christ's Second Coming is the phenomenon that best fits the description of the expression "the coming of that which is perfect". He also avers that the expression "face to face" most likely refers to the state of heavenly glory. John Calvin, despite having first developed the doctrine of cessationism, argues that this begins on the event of the Christian's death.

Some cessationists, such as John F. MacArthur, would agree with the continuationists that "perfection" refers to Christ's Second Coming, but interpret "prophecy" and revelatory gifts in natural terms. Other cessationists would agree with the continuationist interpretations, but disagree with MacArthur about the natural character of the gift of prophecy. (Note: Richard B. Gaffin would agree with the continuationist interpretation, see his Perspectives on Pentecost, p. 109 (Presbyterian and Reformed Publishing Company, New Jersey, 1979), but disagree with the natural character of the gift of prophecy, Perspectives on Pentecost, p. 59. However, Robert L. Thomas would disagree with John F. MacArthur on both accounts: (1) the gift of prophecy is a miraculous gift having a predictive quality,)

However, many cessationists will disagree with the continuationist interpretation and will contend that the event of Christ's Second Coming is instantaneous. Appendix A of "Understanding Spiritual Gifts," "First Corinthians 13:11 Revisited: An Exegetical Update," argues that τὸ τέλειον cannot mean "the perfect", but that it means "mature" or "complete" by showing how the Greek term was used in the NT and all Greek literature. The Greek term used for "perfect" is τέλειος, signifying a process of growth until completion, and not an instantaneous event. In support of this interpretation, it is pointed out that Paul's talk of perfection is illustrated with the metaphorical image of a child's growth unto adulthood. (Note: Walter J. Chandry's fifth section of Signs of the Apostles Concerning the expression "face to face", such cessationists would compare the expression to the Old Testament usage of "face to face" and point out that the expression was used to signify the perfection of the prophetic revelation given to Moses. In other words, the prophetic revelation of God's words through the Mosaic pact was depicted as a perfect revelation that was given "face to face". Paul similarly used the same expression to signify the coming of the perfect completion of the New Testament revelation.)

=== Prophecy and sola scriptura ===
Another concern for cessationists is the argument that modern-day prophecy, invariably in their view, stands in opposition to the Reformed doctrine of Sola Scriptura. The argument is that the Bible as it exists is the full and infallible source of authority for the Church, and therefore the principle of Sola Scriptura would be breached if prophecies were allowed to add new revelation. This argument can be extended to all the revelatory gifts: the word of knowledge, the word of wisdom and interpreted tongues as well as prophecy.

This argument is widely disseminated in cessationist literature, expressing the view that new prophecies and revelations are by definition additions to the canon.

Robert L. Thomas' discussion on this subject in Understanding Spiritual Gifts is summed up when he says, "During the church's foundational days in the first-century era, prophecy furnished its own basis for instruction through revelations from God to the prophet. But those direct revelations are no longer happening, so the only existing basis of authority is Scripture, which has already been revealed."

Richard B. Gaffin makes a similar observation on the extent of a prophetic authority when he says, "The issue is the inspired, Spirit-worked origin of prophecy and its correlative authority. The words of the prophet are the words of God and are to be received and responded to as such."He would object to the continuationist argument that there is "a distinction between different levels of prophetic authority".

In the Lutheran tradition, the New Testament gift of prophecy was viewed in terms of not being on the same level of inspiration as Scripture. For example, the 17th century Lutheran theologian, John Quenstedt urged a humble approach to claiming and sharing prophetic revelations:

We must distinguish between revelations which pertain to, or attack, an article of faith, and those which concern the state of the Church or the State, social life, and future events; the first we repudiate; the latter, however, some hold, are not to be urged with any necessity of believing, nevertheless are not to be rashly rejected. (Francis Pieper, Christian Dogmatics, Vol. 1, p. 211)

The 19th century Lutheran exegete, George Stoeckardt, writes about those receiving the prophetic gift of inspiration in the early church:

"...if the Spirit of God did move them and give them revelation what the Spirit revealed to them, the theme which he suggested to them, they discussed in a free manner, in their own words. So it could easily happen that in their prophecy they let their own and erring thoughts enter,... Therefore, the apostle admonishes the Christians to judge and test the prophecy... (George Stoeckhardt, Commentary on Romans, Koehlinger Translation, page 172)

The view expressed by cessationists is that prophecy is an infallible and divine speech where God directly addresses people and which enjoys the same authority as written acknowledged prophecies. Thus, they are not prepared to accept the authority of new prophets, and see the revelations as inherently being against the principle of sola scriptura. A cessationist is not prepared to accept the authority of new prophets precisely because it would commit him necessarily to the view that the authority of new prophets must be the same as that of biblical prophets such as Jeremiah and John.

== The continuationist response ==
Continuationists attach a weaker sense to the terms 'prophet' or 'prophecy' in that they limit the authority and the scope of prophecy. They argue that a prophecy would not contain new doctrinal content and must instead be tested against the judgment bar of scripture. They further assert that every true prophecy given today has to be consistent with the Bible, and usually cite 1 Thessalonians 5:19–21, " Do not quench the Spirit, do not despise prophesying, but test everything; hold fast what is good".

Wayne Grudem, a continuationist, agrees with cessationists that the modern Church no longer has foundational ministries such as the apostolic and prophetic ministries, as referenced in Ephesians 2:20. These ministries ended at the beginning of the second century. Nevertheless, Grudem and others argue that the gift of prophecy is still in operation, and that this differs from the foundational office of a prophet. The Bible shows, in this view, that not all possessors of the gift of prophecy had the foundational ministry of a prophet. The gift of prophecy was noted for people whose prophecies are not recorded. Thus, there is a distinction in this line of reasoning between foundational and non-foundational prophetic ministries. A non-foundational prophetic ministry would not involve prophecies containing new doctrine and, as such, would not undermine the foundation of the Church.

Some continuationists, such as Craig Simonian, make a similar distinction between canonical and noncanonical prophets. They would maintain that not all prophets have a "canonical authority" by observing two strands of prophets in the Old Testament and that this pattern continued in the New Testament. For instance, where it is written in Acts of people who prophesied but whose prophecies are not recorded. e.g.,

And the same man had four daughters, virgins, which did prophesy.

— Acts 21:9

This distinction is significant in the dispute because a continuationist can avoid the conclusion that modern prophecies may have content with new doctrinal import. Only foundational prophets could devise prophecies with new doctrinal import that serve as the foundation of the Church. Thus continuationalists can agree that the foundational prophetic ministries are gone, without denying the possibility of prophecy in the other sense and without contravening the principle of sola scriptura.

Simonian cites several biblical observations supporting the distinction between canonical (foundational) and noncanonical (nonfoundational) prophets. Some of these biblical observations are reports of people who began prophesying after the Spirit of God had fallen upon them: e.g. Numbers 11:25, when elders started to prophesy; and 1 Samuel 10, when Saul prophesied. In these biblical reports, it is observed that people spontaneously prophesied when the Spirit of God had fallen upon them, although they were not ordinarily prophets. Simonian notes that "what Saul prophesied was not recorded that day and it is likely that his prophesies lacked any lasting significance".

A continuationist will further state that the Bible is an indispensable guide for the verification of prophecies. (Note: Virtually all continuationists agree on this point, See for instance Don Codling, Sola Scriptura and the Revelatory Gifts, pp. 130–131 (Sentinell Press, Rice, 2005); D.A. Carson, Showing the Spirit: 1 Cor 12–14, pp. 163–164; Douglas A. Oss, "A Pentecostal/Charismatic View", in: Are Miraculous Gifts for Today, p. 279.) Verification in this context means an evaluative conclusion by some reliable test that something is true. Falsification, on the other hand, means an evaluative conclusion by some reliable test that something is false.

Also, most continuationists would further contend that a prophecy given by a non-foundational prophet can contain both true and false elements, and for that reason the Scriptures command Christians to test prophecies (cf. 1 Corinthians 14:29; 1 Thessalonians 5:20). (Note: Carson, Showing the Spirit, 95. M.M.B. Turner, on whom Carson is dependent, writes, "The presupposition [of 1 Corinthians 14:29] is that any one New Testament prophetic oracle is expected to be mixed in quality, and the wheat must be separated from the chaff" ("Spiritual Gifts Then and Now," Vox evangelica 15 [1985]:16 [emphasis Turner's]). A similar position is taken by D. Atkinson, Prophecy (Bramcote, England: Grove Books, 1977) 13–14, 16–17. Thus, a continuationist concludes that modern prophecies do not represent an infallible source of authority for the Church and, as such, the principle of sola scriptura is not violated.)

== Implications ==
According to the cessationist perspective, the fundamental problem of continuationism can be formulated thus:

God is the source of the prophecy. Why doesn't prophecy enjoy the same authority as the canonical prophecies of the Bible?

The above problem concerns the question of whether new prophecies would enjoy the same authority as the canonical prophecies of the Bible. According to cessationists, the canon would be open if the gift of prophecy was still in operation. Some continuationists misconstrue the cessationist appeal to the closure of the canon as if cessationists do not acknowledge noncanonical revelations and, then, try to show that the Bible makes clear of the existence of noncanonical revelations. However, the cessationist question regarding noncanonical revelations is about their authority. The cessationist appeal to the closure of the canon does not imply that cessationists do not acknowledge the existence of revelations not included in the canon. The cessationist point is that such noncanonical revelations would enjoy the same authority as the canonical. Consequently, new prophecies and revelations would likewise enjoy the same authority as the canonical prophecies and revelations of the Holy Scriptures. Therefore, noncanonical revelations could, in principle, be included in the canon, had they been written and preserved. The cessationists' main concern is how modern prophetic speech would differ in authority from the inspired speech of canonical prophets and apostles. As an example of such cessationist concern, see Richard Gaffin, "A Cessationist response to C. Samuel Storms and Douglas A. Oss," in: Are Miraculous Gifts For Today?

Thus, the dispute concerning the implication of the closure of the canon revolves around two related issues regarding noncanonical revelation:

1. The validity of continuationist differentiation of degrees of prophetic authority.
2. The validity of the cessationist thesis of the uniform authority of prophecies.

=== Disputes concerning the verification of prophecies ===
An important issue concerns the question of the verification of prophecies. The Scriptures command Christians to test prophecies (cf. 1 Corinthians 14:29, 1 Thessalonians 5:20). A question arises whether this would imply that a prophecy can be a mixture of both true and false elements. Most continuationists would answer positively to this question. (Note: Carson, Showing the Spirit, 95. M.M.B. Turner, on whom Carson is dependent, writes, "The presupposition [of 1 Cor 14:29] is that any one New Testament prophetic oracle is expected to be mixed in quality, and the wheat must be separated from the chaff" [emphasis Turner's]. A similar position is taken by D. Atkinson, Prophecy (Bramcote, England: Grove Books, 1977) 13–14, 16–17. See also a defense for the fallibility of non-canonical prophecies in: C. Samuel Storms, "A Third Wave View," in Are Miraculous Gifts For Today?.)

From the cessationist perspective, however, it is odd to say that a prophecy given by a genuine prophet, i.e., a prophet who was inspired by God's Spirit, can be a mixture of both false and true statements. A cessationist would question the intelligibility of such a notion of true prophecy. Especially, it would be highly problematic, if not self-contradictory, that a prophet would be entitled to declare "and so says the Lord" and utter false statements, as if the Lord's words were deceptive. (Note: More about cessationist interpretation of the command to test prophets, see R. Fowler White, "Gaffin and Grudem on Ephesians 2:20 – In Defense of Gaffin's Cessationist Exegesis", part III. 7. "Explicit Passages on Prophecy by Non-Apostles")

C. Samuel Storms explains how prophecies can be fallible owing to human fallibility:

The key is in recognizing that with every prophecy there are four elements, only one of which is assuredly of God: There is the revelation itself; there is the perception or reception of that revelation by the believer; there is the interpretation of what has been disclosed or the attempt to ascertain its meaning, and there is the application of that interpretation. God alone is responsible for the revelation. (…) It is infallible as he is. It contains no falsehoods… Error enters in when the human recipient of a revelation misperceives, misinterprets and/or misapplies what God has disclosed. The fact that God has spoken perfectly does not mean that human beings have heard perfectly.

Problems raised with this interpretation are:

Firstly, Deuteronomy 18:20–22 teaches that a false prophet, who speaks presumptuously in the name of the Lord, is exposed by discovering falsehoods in his prophetic predictions. Deuteronomy 18 concerns oral prophecies, and thus, it is about noncanonical prophecies. If it is allowed that true prophecies contain error, a cessationist contends that it would not be possible to distinguish true prophets from false prophets who presumptuously speak in the name of the Lord.

Secondly, there is no ground for restricting the continuationist theory of inspiration only to noncanonical prophecies. Consequently, canonical prophecies might be fallible as well. If the fallibility of canonical prophecies is allowed, a cessationist would point out that the continuationist theory of inspiration would thus violate the principle of sola scriptura because sola scriptura teaches that the Scriptures are the only infallible authority for the Church.

=== Non-revelatory gifts ===
On the spectrum of continuationist views, some agree with cessationists that the gift of prophecy is passed along with the office of apostles and prophets. They concede that these specific gifts, being foundational, are passed, but they remain open to all the non-foundational gifts. Martyn Lloyd-Jones maintained a continuationist stance, but held that prophecy was not a gift that the modern Church should expect.

The non-revelatory gifts do not violate the principle of sola scriptura in any formulation of the doctrine. From a cessationist perspective, healings and miracles were always signs associated with the divine confirmation of the genuineness of a prophet in periods when God revealed new truths concerning the doctrine, a view not shared by continuationists. Within a cessationist framework, miracles and healing are signs of apostleship and prophethood, and, thus, are seen in the context of the formation of new doctrines, cf. Acts 2:43, 2 Corinthians 12:12.

== See also ==
- Calvinism
- Charismatic movement
- Deus otiosus
- Pentecostal
- Reformation
- Renewal theologian
