= Antonio Nessi =

Italian engraver, painter, and photographer

Antonio Nessi (1834–1907) was an Italian engraver, painter, and photographer.

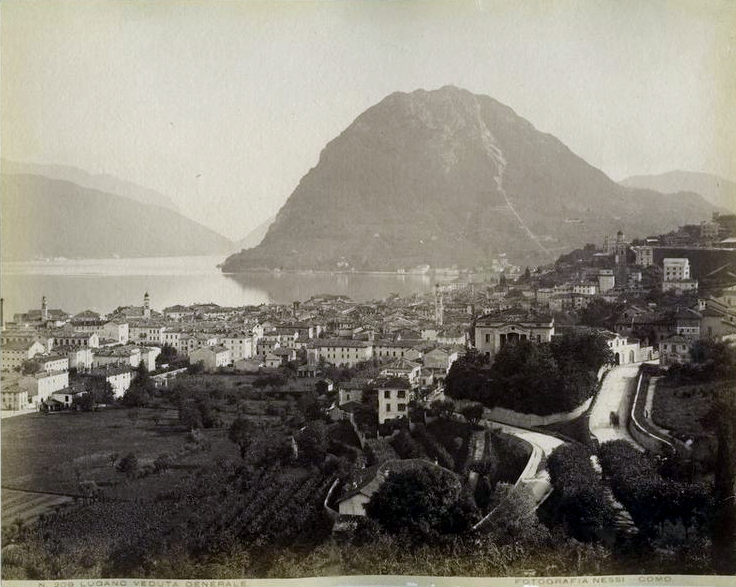
View of Lugano

== Biography ==
Nessi was a native and resident of Como. At the National Exhibition of Turin he exhibited various engravings depicting monuments and architecture of Lombardy, including: Como Cathedral; the Palazzo del Comune (City Hall) of Como; Torre di Porta Vittoria in Como; Basilica of Sant'Abbondio; Prepositura di San Fedele; Parish Church of San Carpoforo; Torre del Baradello; Santa Maria del Tiglio, all in Como; Baptistery of Galliano; Baptistery of Varese: Baptistery of Lenno; Cloister of Pioria; Archbishopric of Castiglione Olona; and the Church of San Pietro al Monte at Civate. He was one of the first landscape and vedute photographers in Northern Lombardy.

== Gallery of early photographs of Lake Como ==
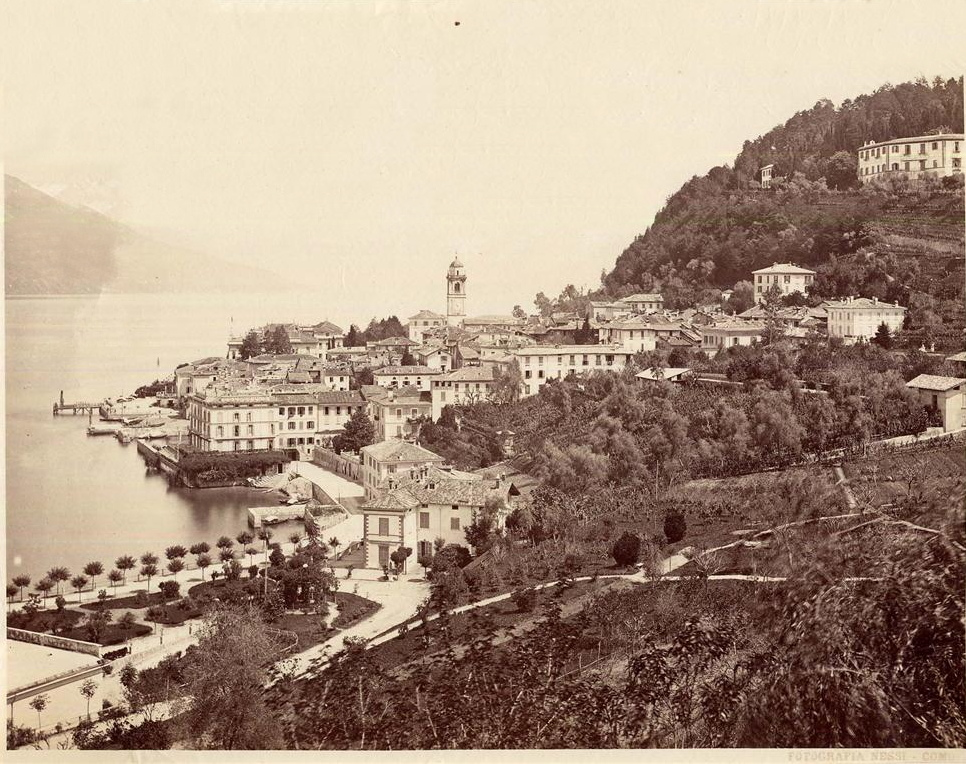
Bellagio

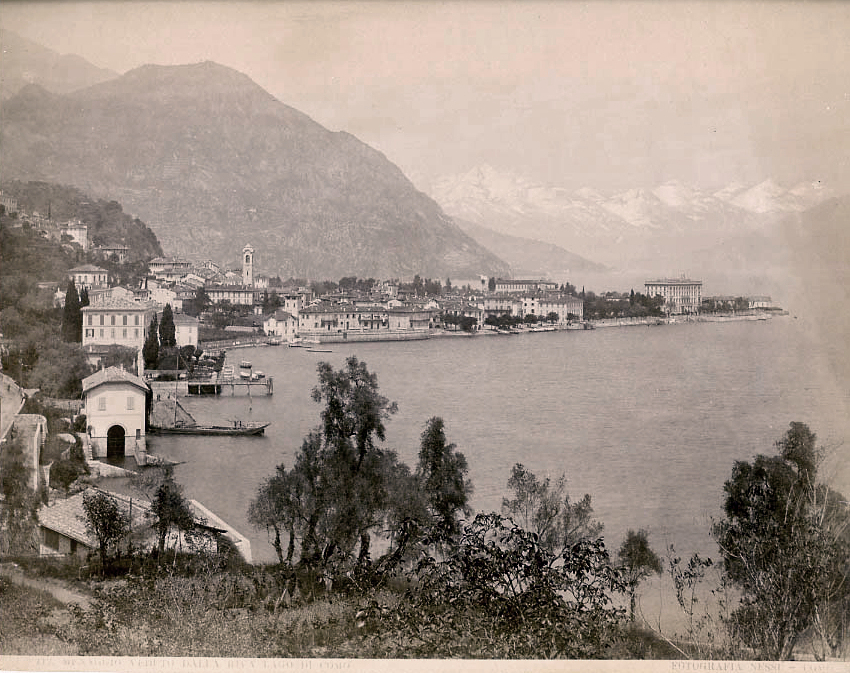
Menaggio

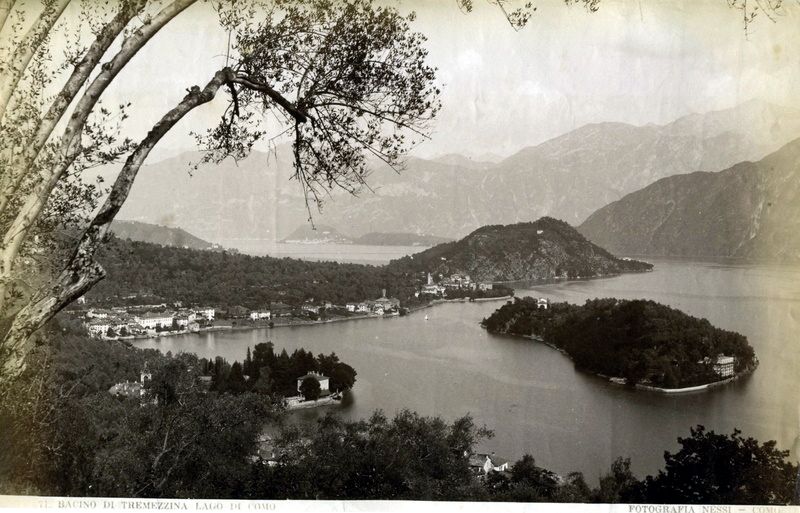
Bacino di Tremezzina (western shore of Lake Como)

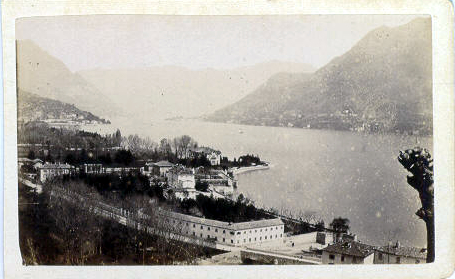
Villa d'Este
