= Oblate =

Person dedicated to the Christian religion

In Christianity (specifically the Roman Catholic, Orthodox, Lutheran, Anglican and Methodist traditions), an oblate is a person associated with a Benedictine monastery or convent who is specifically dedicated to God and service.

Oblates are individuals, either laity or clergy, normally living in general society, who, while not professed monks or nuns, have individually joined themselves to a Benedictine monastic community associated with a certain Christian denomination, such as the Catholic Church or Lutheran Church. Individuals become oblates by undergoing an investiture in which they resolve to follow the Rule of Saint Benedict in their private lives. The Divine Office (canonical hours) is a focus of Benedictines and oblates strive to pray these individually or with others, including with monastics throughout the day in person, or live-streamed; this is normatively prayed seven times a day (cf. Psalm 119:164). They additionally seek to daily read the Bible through the monastic method of Lectio Divina. Benedictine oblates have used the postnominals Obl. O.S.B. or Obl. SB. after their names, usually in private correspondence.

Oblates are comparable to the tertiaries associated with the various mendicant orders. The term "oblate" is also used in the official title of some religious institutes as an indication of their sense of dedication, but are not Benedictine Oblates. (cf. oblation). Oblation may lead to monastic life for some, such as Br. Sixtus Roslevich O.S.B.

== Origins and history ==
The word oblate (from the Latin oblatus – someone who has been offered) has had various particular uses at different periods in the history of the Christian church.

The children vowed and given by their parents to the monastic life, in houses under the Rule of St. Benedict (composed c. 530), were commonly known by this term during the century and a half after its writing, when the custom was in vogue, and the councils of the church treated them as monks. This practice continued until the Tenth Council of Toledo in 656 forbade their acceptance before the age of ten and granted them free permission to leave the monastery, if they wished, when they reached the age of puberty. The term puer oblatus (used after that council) labels an oblate who had not yet reached puberty and thus had a future opportunity to leave the monastery, though puer oblatus can also refer to someone entering an abbey. At a later date the term "oblate" designated such lay men or women as were pensioned off by royal or other patrons upon monasteries or benefices, where they lived as in an almshouse or hospital.

In the 11th century, Abbot William of Hirschau or Hirsau (died 1091), in the old Diocese of Speyer, introduced two kinds of lay brethren into the monastery:

1. the fratres barbati or conversi, who took vows but were not claustral or enclosed monks
2. the oblati, workmen or servants who voluntarily subjected themselves, while in the service of the monastery, to religious obedience and observance.

Afterwards, the different status of the lay brother in the several orders of monks, and the ever-varying regulations concerning him introduced by the many reforms, destroyed the distinction between the conversi and the oblati.

The Cassinese Benedictines, for instance, at first carefully differentiated between conversi, commissi and oblati; the nature of the vows and the forms of the habits were in each case specifically distinct. The conversus, the lay brother properly so called, made solemn vows (like the choir monks), and wore the scapular; the commissus made simple vows, and was dressed like a monk, but without the scapular; the oblatus made a vow of obedience to the abbot, gave himself and his goods to the monastery, and wore a sober secular dress.

Records from 1625 indicate that the Church reduced the conversus below the status of the commissus, inasmuch as he could make only simple vows for a year at a time; he was in fact indistinguishable, except by his dress, from the oblatus of a former century. Then, in the later Middle Ages, oblatus, confrater, and donatus became interchangeable titles, given to any one who, for his generosity or special service to the monastery, received the privilege of lay membership, with a share in the prayers and good works of the brethren.

Canonically, only two distinctions ever had any consequence:

1. that between those who entered religion "per modum professionis" and "per modum simplicis conversionis" the former being monachi and the latter oblati
2. that between the oblate who was "mortuus mundo" ("dead to the world," that is, who had given himself and his goods to religion without reservation), and the oblate who retained some control over his person and his possessions – the former only (plene oblatus) was accounted a persona ecclesiastica, with enjoyment of ecclesiastical privileges and immunity (Benedict XIV, "De Synodo Dioce", VI).

During a revival of monasticism, on June 17, 1898, Pope Leo XIII by decree conferred canonical status and organized the modern Catholic Benedictine Oblates Secular, known popularly as Oblates, that still exist today. The Sacred Congregation of Bishops and Regulars approved the Statutes and Rules for Oblates in 1904 and an amended version was approved on March 24, 1927.

The Benedictine tradition of monasticism has encompassed various Christian denominations, including the Catholic Church, the Lutheran and the Anglican churches. Certain monasteries in the Benedictine tradition are ecumenical in nature, welcoming Christians of all denominations.

== Modern practices ==
=== Secular oblates ===
Many Benedictine communities still retain secular oblates. These are either clergy or laypeople affiliated in prayer with an individual monastery of their choice, who have made a formal private promise (annually renewable or for life) to follow the Rule of St. Benedict in their private life at home and at work as closely as their individual circumstances and prior commitments permit.

Benedictine monasteries are aligned with various Christian denominations, though persons of any Christian denomination are generally accepted as oblates, with certain exceptions. Non-Lutherans may be oblates at Lutheran monasteries, such as Saint Augustine's House in Oxford, Michigan. Similarly in Methodist monasteries, non-Methodist Christians can be received as oblates. The same is the case with many Anglican monasteries, which accept non-Anglican Christians as oblates. Similarly, Anglican (Episcopal) churches also have non-oblate Benedictine communities that are not associated with a monastery. In many Benedictine Catholic monasteries (such as Saint Benedict's Monastery (St. Joseph, Minnesota)), oblates include Christians from the Catholic Church or other those belonging to other Christian denominations; however, other Benedictine Catholic monasteries, such as Ampleforth Abbey, admit only Catholics as oblates while other Christians are able to become associates.

Both men and women, including husbands and wives separately but encouraged to be together, may become Benedictine oblates.

=== Conventual oblates ===
There is a number of conventual or claustral oblates, who live in a monastic community. If the person has not done so previously, after a year's probation they make a simple commitment of their lives to the monastery, which is received by the superior in the presence of the whole community. At the end of the canonical novitiate year, they make their oblation and promise obedience to the abbot, their willingness to share in monastic life and to place their own strengths at the disposal of the monastery and its mission. While the monks or nuns renounce all their own possessions with the solemn vows, a contract is concluded with the conventual oblates that regulates the mutual obligations. It also determines whether it is an oblation for a specific period of time or forever. The promise of an oblate can be dissolved by the oblate himself or by the abbot for a just reason.

=== Process to investiture as an oblate ===
There are different members of a Benedictine oblate community: Inquirer or Aspirant, Postulant, Novice, Oblate Secular or Oblate (Christian who lives outside the monastery) and Oblate Regular (Christian who lives inside the monastery).

The Inquirer attends Mass and Oblate Meetings, prays with the community and monks, and participates in other Oblate activities. Inquirers may participate indefinitely when an Abbey does not publish a time limit for inquiry. The Inquirer applies to become an Oblate in writing and of their own free will, which begins at least a 3-month Postulancy or Probation. An Inquirer may apply multiple times to become a Postulant.

Three months or more after applying, the Christian Postulant is enrolled as a Novice during an investiture with a scapular. During the ceremony, the Novice may receive a Scapular of St. Benedict which "from this time on, always to be worn under the ordinary garments." In 1965, Pope Paul VI gave "permission to wear the medal of St. Benedict in the place of the scapular". "A Certificate of Enrollment, signed by the officiant, should be given to each of the newly accepted Oblate Novices ...to be reminded when it is time to make their Final Oblation a year later...then, too, in case of death, the date of death should be noted on the certificate, and this in turn is to be sent to the monastery or convent, so that the community may pray for the deceased Oblate Novice." The officiant should also see that each Novice provides himself with a Manual for Oblates which is approved by the Catholic Church and contains the Statute of Oblates and Rule of Benedict. A Novice is an Oblate candidate only at the monastery of enrollment, but may seek that Abbott's written permission to transfer to another monastery. For those monasteries that set a Noviciate time limit, those who do not meet that deadline may become an Inquirer again and also may inquire of other Oblates and Third Orders. A Novice can terminate novitiate at any time in writing.

"A year and a day after this investiture, the Oblate Novice shall be allowed to make his final Act of Oblation in the presence of the Abbott or Prior." The Novitiate time period is not waivable. During that year and a day, the Novice discerns whether they are called to be an Oblate, gains insight on the practices of the monastery, attends Novitiate classes, studies the Rule and the Oblate Statute, seeks to fully understand the actions of an Oblate, participates in Oblate activities, and meets or better knows the other members of the Benedictine community: Monks, Inquirers, Postulants, Novices, Oblates and Associates. After a Novice has been approved to become an Oblate, a ceremony of "Commitment" or "Final Oblation" takes place.

=== Activities of an oblate ===
The Oblates are Christians who desire, for a more secure realization of their personal perfection, to draw near the monks, participate in their life and be pervaded with their spirit

— Dom Paul Chauvin

Oblates seek to live as monks and nuns while being in the world, seeking God and pursuing holiness "in their everyday life, in their family, and in their workplace." They strive to pray the canonical hours, which are prayed at seven fixed prayer times throughout the day (cf. Psalm 119:164) Oblates may pray these individually, with their families, or may join monks or nuns at Benedictine monasteries or convents to do the same. Oblates strive to live according to the Rule of Saint Benedict. Benedictine oblates have two mottos: (1) "UT IN OMNIBUS GLORIFICETUR DEUS" - That in all things God may be glorified; (2) "Pax" - Peace. Oblates are to practice Lectio Divina, the traditional monastic practice of reading the Bible, daily. Oblates seek a life exemplified by prayer, along with the regular reception of the sacraments, particularly the Eucharist and Confession.

== Bridgettine oblates ==
The first statutes for Bridgettine oblates were approved by Pope Pius XII in 1947. Oblates include both men an women. Oblate groups belonging to the branch of the order founded by St. Elizabeth Hesselblad are ecumenical, and open for example to Lutherans. There are Bridgettine oblates in England, Italy, Sweden, Norway and Finland. Convent of St. Birgitta in Connecticut in United States has oblates attached to it.

== Religious congregations that use "oblate" in their name ==
There are several religious orders (i.e., living the consecrated life according to church law) that use the word "oblate" in their name, or in an extended version of their common name. These are not oblates like the oblates (secular) and (regular), and should not be confused with them.

Examples include the:

- Oblates of St. Francis de Sales
- Missionary Oblates of Mary Immaculate
- Oblates of the Virgin Mary
- Oblates of St Frances of Rome (founded 1433 in Italy, as a community of professed oblates living in common)
- Oblate Sisters of Providence
- Oblates of St. Joseph
- Oblates of Saints Ambrose and Charles

== Notable oblates ==
- Saint Boniface
- Bede
- St. Henry II, Holy Roman Emperor
- St. Hildegard of Bingen
- St. Frances of Rome
- Servant of God Dorothy Day
- Kathleen Norris
- Walker Percy
- Gottschalk of Orbais
- Cardinal Francis Eugene George, O.M.I.
- St. Eugene de Mazenod, O.M.I.
- Cardinal Jean-Marie Rodrigue Villeneuve, O.M.I.
- Servant of God Romano Guardini
- Blessed Hanna Helena Chrzanowska
- Joris-Karl Huysmans

== See also ==
- Third order
- Bruderhof Communities
