= Gifts of healing =

Christian theological concept

In Christian theology, the gifts of healing are among the spiritual gifts listed in 1 Corinthians 12. As an extraordinary charism, gifts of healing are supernatural enablements given to a believer to minister various kinds of healing and restoration to individuals through the power of the Holy Spirit. In the Greek of the New Testament, both the words gift and healing are plural.

In the Gospel of Mark's account of the Great Commission, Jesus stated that one of the signs to follow believers in him would be healing after the laying on of hands. In the fifth chapter of the Epistle of James, anointing with oil is involved with the laying on of hands and prayer over the sick. These symbolize that believers were channels of divine power and that the healing was the work of the Holy Spirit. Healing is also connected with the forgiveness of sins.

Pentecostal and charismatic Christians believe "that God has made provision that physical healing would be a ministry of His church and that gifts of healings would operate along with faith". However, they also believe that no minister of healing will heal all that come to them. Faith on the part of the one who prays is essential for healing, but many times faith on the part of one being prayed for is important as well. All Pentecostals and charismatics are encouraged to pray for the healing of the sick even if they do not claim possession of the supernatural gift.

== See also ==
- Faith healing
- Intercession
