= Word of Knowledge =

Spiritual gift in Christianity

In Christianity, the word of knowledge is a spiritual gift listed in 1 Corinthians 12:8. It has been associated with the ability to teach the faith or to know certain secrets or hidden events, through inexplicable divine inspiration or revelation. It is closely related to another spiritual gift, the word of wisdom.

== Description ==
Throughout church history, this gift has often been viewed as a teaching gift and connected with being able to understand scriptural truth. The Catholic Encyclopedia defines it as "the grace of propounding the Faith effectively, of bringing home to the minds and hearts of the listener with Divine persuasiveness, the hidden mysteries and the moral precepts of Christianity".

Among Pentecostal and some Charismatic Christians, the word of knowledge is often defined as the ability of one person to know what God is currently doing or intends to do in the life of another person. It can also be defined as knowing the secrets of another person's heart. Through this revelation, it is believed that God encourages the faith of the believer to receive the healing or comfort that God offers. For example, in a public gathering, a person who claims to have the gift of knowledge may describe a medical problem and ask anyone suffering from the described problem to identify themselves and receive an effective prayer for healing. According to this definition, the word of knowledge is a form of revelation similar to prophecy or a type of discernment.
