= Word of wisdom =

Spiritual gift in Christianity

In Christianity, the word of wisdom is a spiritual gift listed in 1 Corinthians 12:8. The function that this gift is given varies. Some Christians see in this gift a prophetic-like function. Others see in the word of wisdom a teaching function. This gift is closely related with the gift of the word of knowledge.

== Description ==
Commentators have often placed this gift within the larger context of the biblical wisdom tradition, especially references to God’s secret wisdom in 1 Corinthians 2:6-10 and elsewhere in the letter. The secret wisdom pertains to the Gospel that Paul preached. This wisdom relates to that which God had previously hidden and destined for the glory of believers. It is a wisdom that speaks of those things that God has prepared for those who love him. These emphases from the broader context of the Corinthian letter could imply that the word of wisdom involves insight into God's plan of salvation and the proclamation of Christ crucified.

Commentators have noted both a prophetic and a teaching character to the word of wisdom. Among Charismatics, the gift is often defined as a revelation of the Holy Spirit that applies scriptural wisdom to a specific situation that a Christian community faces. According to Pentecostal theologian Donald Gee, "One is deeply conscious that the supremely right thing has been said and the true course of action indicated. No further appeal is desired because the heart rests in a calm satisfaction that the will of God has been revealed".

Some commentators translate the term as "teaching of wisdom" and prefer to focus on the gift's function in teaching the truths of scripture. The Catholic Encyclopedia defines it as "the grace of propounding the Faith effectively, of bringing home to the minds and hearts of the listener with Divine persuasiveness, the hidden mysteries and the moral precepts of Christianity". Donald Gee writes:

there ofttimes comes shining forth a revelation in words that make our hearts burn within us. Many of us have experienced the holy awe and the thrilling exaltation of spirit that accompanies a ministry of the spiritual gift of the word of wisdom on these lines. We have recognized once again 'not the words which man's wisdom teacheth, but which the Holy Ghost teacheth.' And with the recognition has come a deep thankfulness that these glorious ministrations of the Spirit are still active in the church.
