= List of parachurch organizations =

Parachurch organizations are Christian faith-based organizations that usually carry out their mission independent of church oversight.

Most parachurch organizations, at least those normally called parachurch, are Protestant and Evangelical. Some of these organizations cater to a defined spectrum among evangelical beliefs, but most are self-consciously interdenominational and many are ecumenical.

Roles that parachurch organizations undertake include larger more national or international movements:

- Evangelistic crusade associations (patterned after the Billy Graham Evangelistic Association)
- Evangelistic and discipleship ministries (such as The Navigators, Cru (Christian organization), and InterVarsity Christian Fellowship)
- Music and print publishers, radio and television stations, film studios, online ministries
- Study centers and institutes, schools, colleges and universities
- Political and social activist groups

And smaller, more localized movements:

- Welfare and social services, including homeless shelters, child care, and domestic violence, disaster relief programs, food pantries and clothing closets, and emergency aid centers (such as the City Missions)
- Self-help groups
- Bible study groups

== Evangelical ==
=== International ===
Some international parachurch ministries include:

- Alpha course
- Awana
- Bible Society
- Billy Graham Evangelistic Association
- CAMA Services
- Child Evangelism Fellowship
- Christian Missionary Fellowship International
- Christian Motorcyclists Association
- Christian Research Institute
- Christians for Biblical Equality
- City Missions and Gospel Rescue Missions
- Compassion International
- Covenant Players
- Cru (Christian organization) including Athletes in Action, FamilyLife, the Jesus Film Project
- CURE International
- David C Cook
- Everyman's Welfare Service
- Every Home for Christ
- Gideons International
- Grace Covenant
- Great Commission church movement
- International Fellowship of Evangelical Students association of Christian student movements worldwide (including InterVarsity Christian Fellowship in the U.S.)
- International House of Prayer founded by Mike Bickle (minister)
- Langham Partnership International founded by John Stott
- Living Waters Publications/The Way of the Master evangelism training programs headed by Kirk Cameron and Ray Comfort
- Mercy Ships (founded by YWAM)
- The Navigators
- Operation Inasmuch
- Operation Mobilisation
- Prison Fellowship
- Renovaré
- Samaritan's Purse
- Scripture Union
- Teen Challenge
- U.S. Center for World Mission
- Word of Life Fellowship
- World Vision International
- Wycliffe Bible Translators
- Young Life
- Youth for Christ
- Youth With A Mission (YWAM) international mission agency with particular focus on youth and the World's poor and disadvantaged.

=== United States and Canada ===
Some parachurch ministries in the United States and Canada include:

- A Better World - an organization that is based in Lacombe, Alberta, Canada
- Answers in Genesis Apologetics & Biblical authority ministry.
- Christianity Today A leading periodical for evangelicals, founded by Billy Graham in 1956
- CCO Regional campus ministry partnering with local churches.
- Cru (Christian organization) including Athletes in Action, FamilyLife, the Jesus Film Project
- Focus on the Family Resources for Christian families, singles, and various age groups, professions
- Habitat for Humanity, known for extensive work by President Jimmy Carter
- InterVarsity Christian Fellowship College ministry affiliated with the International Fellowship of Evangelical Students
- Promise Keepers A renewal movement for men
- Rapture Ready Promotes knowledge of Christian rapture theory
- Ride for Refuge - a cycling event that raises awareness and funds for displaced persons
- Samaritan's Purse Interdenominational disaster relief aid
- Youth for Christ
- Many crisis pregnancy centers in the United States are operated on a parachurch basis, having boards of directors not affiliated with or under the control of any single church or congregation.

== Non-Evangelical specific ==
=== United Kingdom ===
- Association of Interchurch Families, family support group
- Christian Aid, international development agency backed by UK churches
- Christians Against Poverty, a charity that deals with debt counselling
- Christian Concern For Our Nation, campaigning group on legal and political changes
- Churches Together in England, national ecumenical organisation

=== International ===
- MOPS International, a Christian mothers organization

== Ecumenical ==
- People of Praise
