= C4C =

"C4C" is an abbreviation that can stand for:

- Cadet Fourth Class, the rank of a cadet in his first (freshman) year at the United States Air Force Academy
- Campaigners for Christ, a parachurch organization
- Cancer 4 Cure, the third full-length studio album by El-P, released on Fat Possum Records May 22, 2012.
- Cash for Clunkers, a colloquial name for the Car Allowance Rebate System program in the US
- Cause 4 Concern, a drum and bass recording and production group
- Challoner's for Charity, a student group from Dr Challoners Grammar School, Buckinghamshire who organise charity events in school to raise money for a variety of charities.
- Channel Four Television Corporation, operator of the UK public-service television channel: Channel 4
- Sid Meier's Civilization IV: Colonization, a 2008 PC game made by 2K Games and an installment in the Civilization series.
