= Dictator literature =

Literature written by dictators

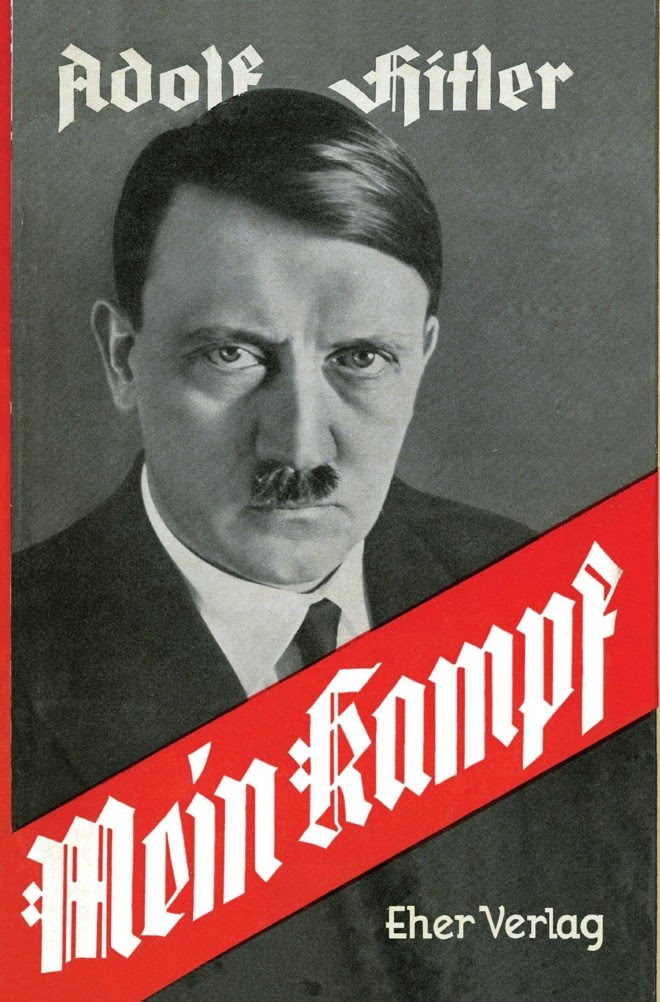
Cover of Mein Kampf, the autobiography and manifesto of German dictator Adolf Hitler

Dictator literature (abbreviated as dic-lit or dictator lit) is the body of literature written by or attributed to dictators. Although some dictator literature consists of poetry, most are prose, including such works as novels, theoretical texts, tracts, and memoirs. Vladimir Lenin is considered to be the father of dictator literature in the 20th century, and many other dictators of the century followed suit with their own writings, such as Adolf Hitler, Joseph Stalin, and Mao Zedong.
