= Noel Stanton =

English religious leader

- Church: Bugbrooke Jesus Fellowship
- Installed: 1957
- Term ended: 2009
- Successor: Mick Haines
- Other post: Leader of the Jesus Army

Personal details
- Born: 25 December 1926 Bedfordshire, England
- Died: 20 May 2009 (aged 82)
- Denomination: Christianity
- Residence: Bugbrooke
- Occupation: Pastor

Noel Stanton (25 December 1926 – 20 May 2009) was the founder of the Jesus Army, also known as the Jesus Fellowship Church, a charismatic Christian movement known for its communal living. Under his leadership from 1957 until shortly before his death, the church grew from a small Baptist congregation in Bugbrooke, Northamptonshire, into a nationwide network of communities that attracted individuals from marginalised backgrounds, including the homeless and those recovering from addiction.

Following his death in 2009, numerous allegations emerged implicating Stanton in fostering a culture of control and abuse; former members reported cases of sexual, spiritual, and psychological abuse, including minors being subjected to coercion and assault, leading to official investigations and a redress scheme to compensate over 40 identified victims.

The Jesus Fellowship Community Trust closed in 2020 following scandals, and issued a closure statement including an unreserved apology for the abuse that occurred in the Jesus Fellowship Church and the residential New Creation Christian Community (NCCC).

== Life ==
Stanton was born in Bedfordshire and educated at Bedford Modern School. His parents were farmers. When he was 18, he was conscripted into the Royal Navy. The Navy sent him to Sydney, Australia, where he was approached by evangelist Frank Jenner, who asked him, "If you should die tonight, where would you go? Would it be heaven or hell?" Stanton felt conflicted for several months afterwards and consequently converted to Christianity the next year.

When World War II ended, Stanton attended All Nations Bible College and worked for and then went into business. In 1957, he became the pastor of a Baptist church in Bugbrooke, Northamptonshire. Under Stanton's leadership, the church took on characteristics of the Charismatic movement and then of the 1960s counterculture. In 1973, he began turning the church into an intentional community modelled after early Christianity, and the resulting movement became the Jesus Army. He wrote the book Your Baptism Into Jesus Christ and His Church, which was published in 1998. Stanton remained the Jesus Army's leader until 2009, when he named Mick Haines the new leader before dying on 20 May.

== Allegations of abuse ==
After Stanton's death in 2009, the Jesus Army supplied allegations to Northamptonshire Police of sexual offences committed by Stanton and others, and as of 2019 there were 43 complainants of historic sexual and physical abuse. The Jesus Fellowship Redress Scheme was available to those who suffered harm, abuse and/or adverse experiences within the Jesus Fellowship community.

The scheme to compensate members identified 539 alleged perpetrators of alleged abuse and revealed about one in six children had been sexually abused; 601 individuals applied for damages, though the trust recognised the true number of victims was likely to be greater. The trust accepted ultimate responsibility for 264 alleged abusers, 61 percent of them former leaders. Some twelve former members of the Jesus Fellowship Church have been convicted for indecent assaults and other offences.
