= Rapture Ready =

Evangelical Christian website

Rapture Ready is an Evangelical Christian website, originally a Usenet forum, founded by Todd Strandberg in 1987, that promotes the belief that the rapture will occur in the near future, with true Christians being taken up to Heaven. The site tracks the real-world occurrence of events that Strandberg believes are prophesied in the Bible, and uses these to calculate what Strandberg sees as the approach of the rapture.

Originally, Rapture Ready (then called "Rapture Index") consisted of threads in Usenet newsgroups such as alt.bible.prophecy and alt.christnet.second-coming.real-soon-now. In 1995, Rapture Index became a website. In 1997, it was renamed "Rapture Ready".

== Features ==
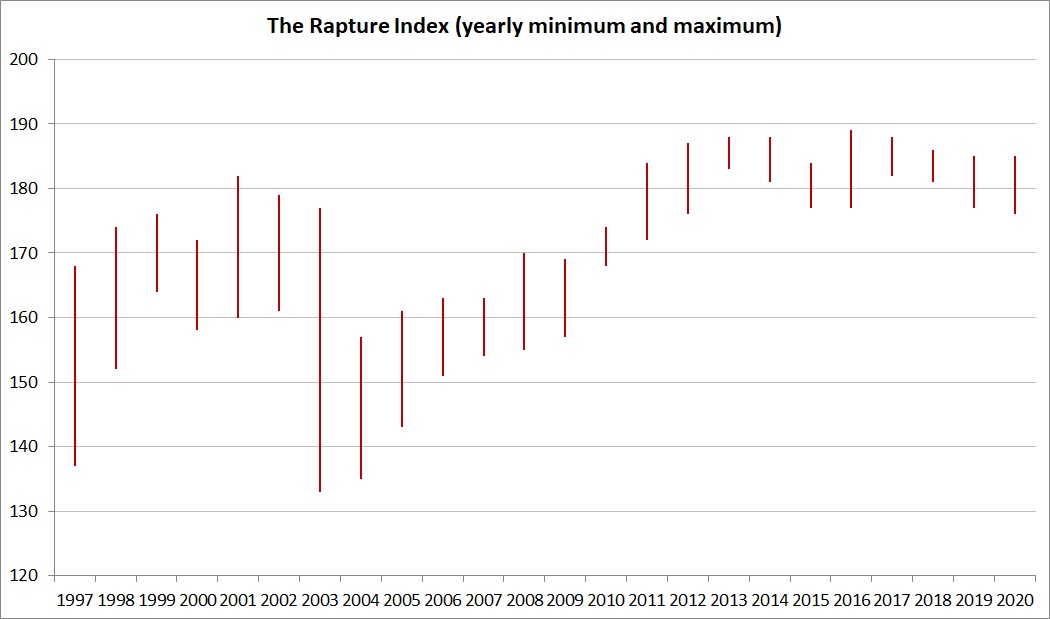
The Rapture Ready's Rapture Index from 1997 to 2020, showing the annual lowest and highest values.

The "Rapture Index" keeps track of activities which Strandberg believes could be indicators of a time when the Rapture might occur. The index includes Strandberg's numerical measurement of world events and trends in light of conservative Christian views on Bible prophecy regarding the end times.

== See also ==
- Doomsday Clock
