= Association of Interchurch Families =

The Association of Interchurch Families is a charity that operates in Great Britain as a support group for families in which the partners are members of different Christian denominations, usually but not always where one of the spouses is a Roman Catholic.

== Overview ==
The organization works to promote interdenominational marriages while encouraging each spouse to remain an active member in their respective branch. The organization works to dispel negative sentiment about interchurch marriages and educate mixed church couples about the changing pastoral rules and advocates instructing the children from these marriages in both branches of the faith.

Much of the organization's work focuses on marriages between the Roman Catholic Church and another Christian denomination as the Catholic doctrine follows a very strict set of guidelines, particularly in marriage. Failure to follow those rules may result in an annulment of the marriage by the Catholic Church.

The Interchurch Families web site is one of the largest single source of information for interchurch families. It seeks to link all those families, groups, and associations so that together they may grow in Christian unity, by affirming at local, national and global levels the gifts of interchurch families and while realizing their potential as a catalyst for wider church unity. The association also produced a bi-annual journal with changing rules and pastoral practices until 2004, but has since switched to an email newsletter.

The Interchurch Families Listserv enables interchurch families to discuss ways of dealing with immediate issues which arise as a consequence of living their marital unity within churches which are divided.

== See also ==
- Ecumenism
- Churches Together in Britain and Ireland
- Churches Together in England
