= Jesus Army =

Neocharismatic evangelical Christian movement

Jesus Fellowship Church
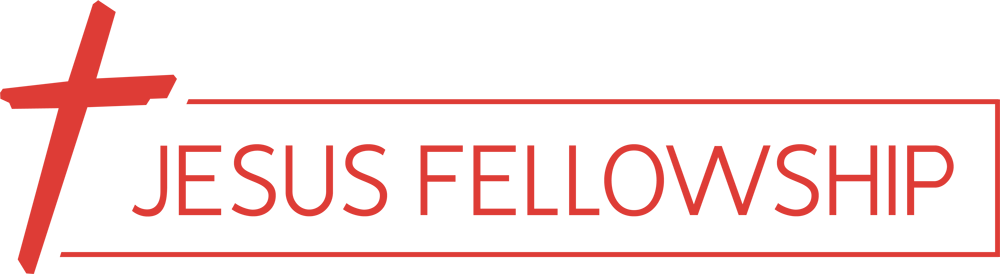
- Jesus Fellowship Church Logo
- Classification: Protestant
- Orientation: Evangelical
- Theology: Neocharismatic
- Headquarters: Northampton, United Kingdom
- Founder: Noel Stanton
- Origin: 1969

The Jesus Army, also known as the Jesus Fellowship Church and the Bugbrooke Community, was a neocharismatic evangelical Christian organisation based in the United Kingdom, which has been considered as a cult. Part of the British New Church Movement, the name Jesus Army was used specifically for the outreach and street-based evangelism for which they were known.

The Jesus Fellowship was founded in 1969 by Noel Stanton (1926–2009), who at that time was the lay pastor of the Baptist chapel in the village of Bugbrooke near Northampton. It expanded in the ensuing decades by appealing to a younger generation of worshippers. As the new church grew and became more charismatic in nature, many of the original congregation left to continue worshipping in more traditional churches. The Fellowship continued to grow considerably and by 2007 consisted of approximately 3,500 members in around twenty-four congregations in various cities and towns of the UK. The church frequently engaged in evangelism in public places, seeking through outreach to demonstrate the love of Jesus and the moving of the Holy Spirit. The Fellowship used various slogans, in its early days adopting "Love, Power & Sacrifice" and later "Jesus People, Loving People," and the name "Jesus Army."

The Jesus Fellowship announced in May 2019 that it "will cease to exist and the current National Leadership Team will be stepping down from their roles once the winding up of the central Church has been completed." Members had voted on 26 May 2019 to revoke the church's constitution, after a decline in membership to less than 1,000 following claims against Stanton and two other then-members of the church of a history of sexual assault during the 1970s. It was planned that the Jesus Centres charity organized by the church would continue to operate and that individual churches would become independent congregations. Fewer than 200 people were still living in communal households of the Fellowship.

In October 2021 Companies House certified the change of name from Jesus Centres Trust (1165925) to JCT - Joining Communities Together Limited. Since December 2020, the Jesus Fellowship Community Trust existed as a residuary body with the sole purpose of winding up the administrative affairs of the Jesus Fellowship Church. A 2024 "Final Report," described as "staggering," stated that a Jesus Fellowship Redress Scheme was available "to those who have suffered harm, abuse and/or adverse experiences within the Jesus Fellowship community. It also provided a clear process for employment, pension, national insurance and retirement claims."

== Distinctive features ==
The Jesus Fellowship operated like the house church movements, or the more radical elements of the larger, more conventional churches. It was affected by the charismatic movement of the late 1960s and early '70s, and influenced by the Jesus people movement in the United States. According to author William Kay, Stanton was highly influenced by Arthur Wallis's book In the Day of Thy Power, and associated with a number of the early leaders within the British New Church movement. The beliefs of the Jesus Fellowship are in line with historic Christian orthodoxy. Nevertheless, there are various aspects of the Fellowship's way of practising Christianity that are distinctive when compared with more conventional churches.

=== Jesus Army, evangelism and ministry to the marginalised ===
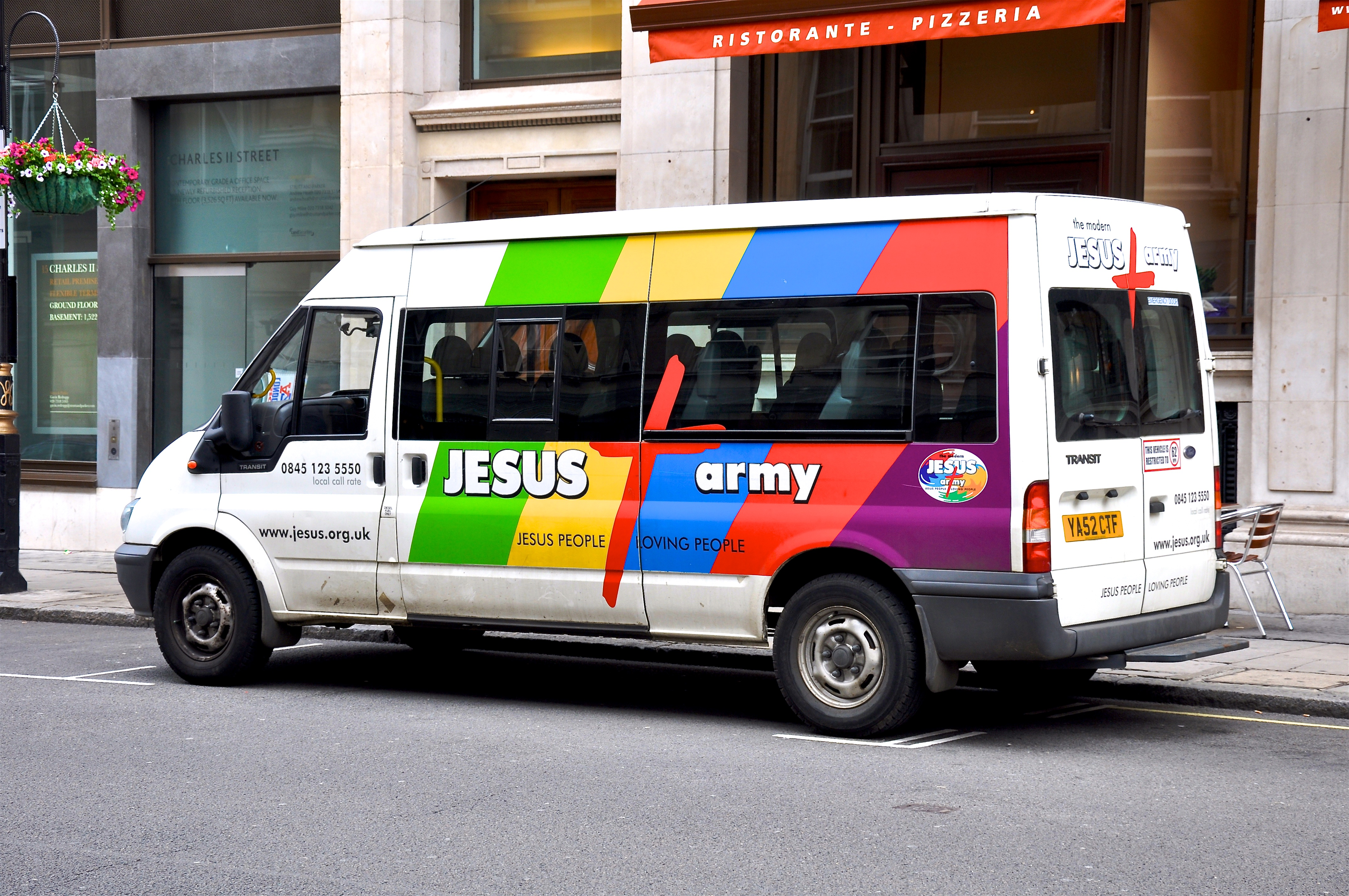
A Jesus Army minibus in 2009

The British public were most likely to be aware of the Jesus Army by its brightly coloured minibuses and coaches, and the highly visible multi-coloured camouflage jackets often worn by Jesus Army evangelists on the street. The Jesus Army was launched in 1987 as the campaigning identity of the Jesus Fellowship. Following the example of the early Salvation Army, and with a stated intention to "go where others will not go," the Jesus Army engaged in what has been called "aggressive and effective street evangelism among the marginalized sections of society." The Jesus Army's mission was described as "essentially one to the poor, the disadvantaged and the marginalized." Since 1987 the Jesus Army held an annual high-profile gospel event in London called London Jesus Day with a three-hour public event on Trafalgar Square, then (until 2005) an evening event in a marquee on Roundwood Park.

=== Jesus Army Charitable Trust and Jesus Centres ===
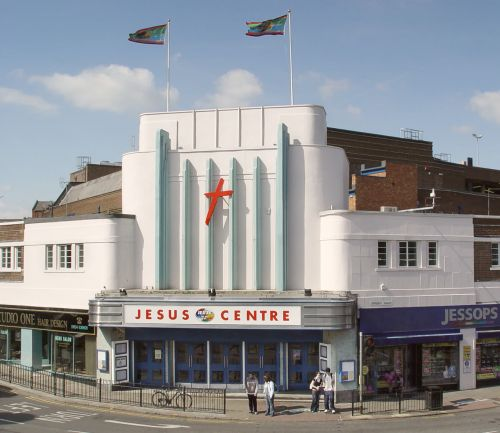
The Northampton Jesus Centre in a converted cinema

Growing from the Jesus Army's work among homeless street people, those involved in drug or alcohol abuse, and prisoners and ex-prisoners, the Jesus Army/Jesus Fellowship founded a charitable trust "to develop and enhance its existing work with many disadvantaged groups and individuals", largely through the founding and running of "Jesus Centres" in UK cities and towns.

In 2002, the Jesus Fellowship opened the Coventry Jesus Centre including a Drop-In Centre known as "The Bridge", which provided services such as a subsidised breakfast, free clothing, showers and hot drinks, as well as social support, job training and providing medical help to vulnerable people. The centre also assisted in finding rented accommodation for the homeless, though a major emphasis of these activities was evangelistic, "bringing people to Jesus". Other Jesus Centres were opened in Northampton (2004), Central London (2008) and Sheffield (2011).

=== Multiply Christian Network ===
The Jesus Fellowship was also linked to around 250 other churches and groups in the UK and elsewhere through the Multiply Christian Network, which it initiated in 1992.

=== Youth ministry ===
From 2007 to 2017 the Jesus Army hosted a yearly event for young people aged between 15 and 35 called "RAW (Real and Wild)". In contrast with many Christian churches which often have an aging population, the Jesus Army had a comparatively high proportion of young members.

=== New Creation Christian Community ===
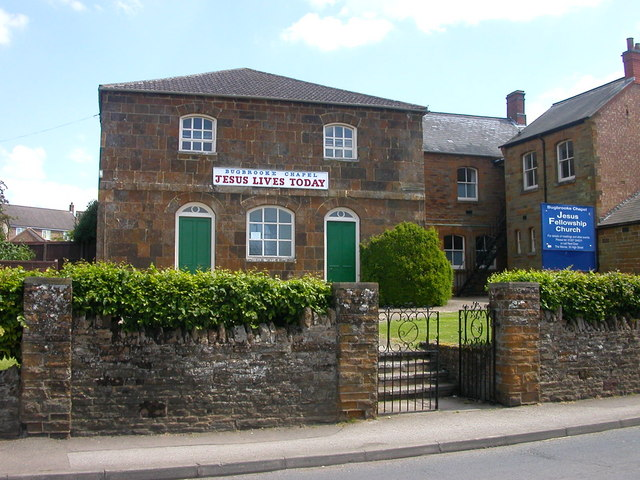
Bugbrooke Baptist Chapel in 2008

In the early years of the Jesus Fellowship, a residential Christian community was founded for its growing membership. Initially, a large Anglican rectory in Bugbrooke was purchased and renamed "New Creation Hall". Several members of the Jesus Fellowship moved in and it became the first centre of a community lifestyle. By 1979, several other large houses in the surrounding area were purchased and "New Creation Christian Community," as the entire community was named, was established, with some 350 residents. At its height in the early 1990s there were roughly 850 residents in about 60 communal households, but their numbers later dropped to less than 200 persons. Motivation for the Jesus Fellowship's venture into residential communal living and the sharing of possessions came primarily from their interpretation of Biblical descriptions of the early church.

The Jesus Fellowship's community had many features in common with other charismatic Christian intentional communities and part of the initial stimulation towards starting the New Creation Christian Community came from the Church of the Redeemer, Houston, Texas, established by the Episcopalian priest Graham Pulkingham. New Creation Christian Community was one of the largest intentional Christian communities in Europe. According to sociologist Stephen J. Hunt, the Jesus Fellowship's community "has been a source of inspiration and frequently attracts visitors from Europe and beyond who wish to observe, and sometimes imitate, a vibrant and enduring model of charismatic community life." Residents of each community house ranged in number from 6 to 60 people. The pattern of community life in the largest, down to the smallest residence, was modelled along the same principles and pattern. Those dwelling in a community house, along with the majority of members who lived outside but who are formally attached to it, made up the "church household". The church household was the basic unit of the Jesus Fellowship, usually comprising both members who lived in community and a majority who did not. Several church households usually came together to form congregations for public worship along with members of the public who wished to attend. Jesus Fellowship congregations typically met in a hired venue such as a school or community centre, although latterly the church purchased "Jesus Centres" in some cities and towns: the Jesus Fellowship in these places used these centres as their venue for public meetings.

The community founded a series of Christian businesses (House of Goodness group) employing once up to 250 people. Profits from the businesses helped fund the wider work of the Jesus Fellowship. Businesses and community houses were owned by a Trust Fund ultimately controlled by the members. In 2001, one of the houses was featured in a Channel 4 television documentary, Battlecentre.

=== Membership ===
There were a variety of levels of commitment in the Jesus Fellowship with corresponding types of membership. Those in the loosest forms of membership may have been merely attached to a Jesus Fellowship weeknight "cell group" or attended only on Sundays. Others were more involved. The committed core membership of the Jesus Fellowship consisted of "covenant members", those who had made a "covenant", or pledge expressing an intention of lifelong loyalty to the Jesus Fellowship. Even within covenant membership, there were four different "styles". "Style 1" was the non-resident membership, with a similar membership practice to that of most members of other churches. "Style 2" covenant members entered into closer financial and general accountability.

"Style 3" covenant members were the residential members of the New Creation Christian Community: all their income, wealth and possessions were shared, though they may have reclaimed them should they subsequently decide to leave. While they were members, the value of their contribution was protected by the Trust Fund. Becoming a member of the Jesus Fellowship's community was a gradual process and most of those who joined the community had already belonged to the Jesus Fellowship as part of its broader membership first. "Style 4" was for covenant members who lived at a distance and were unable to join regularly in the life of the church.

=== Celibacy and marriage ===
The Jesus Fellowship was the only new church stream that advocated and practised celibacy, claiming that it led to a full life for single people. Within the Jesus Fellowship there were both couples and male and female celibates. The Jesus Fellowship claimed both as high callings. The main justification used for advocating celibacy was that it freed a member for ministry, particularly in the unsocial hours that Jesus Army campaigning required. Some critics maintained that the Jesus Fellowship taught celibacy as a better or higher way, and that single members felt pressured into making the vow. Others denied this and insisted that both marriage and family life, and celibacy were held in high regard in the Jesus Fellowship. Celibacy was, however, described by the Jesus Fellowship as "a precious gem". At most some 200 Fellowship members were committed to celibacy, plus a further 100 or so probationers. There were instances where committed celibates subsequently entered into married life within the Jesus Fellowship, but this was not taken lightly. Such a step could involve sanctions such as having one's leadership responsibilities reduced.

Noel Stanton, the Jesus Fellowship's original leader, was himself a celibate, and the senior leadership of the church was made up of roughly 50 percent celibates and 50 percent who were married. Despite this high view of celibacy, studies indicate that marriage and the family were afforded a high priority by the Jesus Fellowship. According to sociologist Stephen J. Hunt, marriage in the Jesus Fellowship was seen as "a ministering relationship in which human warmth and Christian fellowship can be offered to others, providing spiritual parenting for those who are emotionally damaged." Hunt found that "where problems in child-rearing occur, support and advice for the parents is on hand from fellow members. Even those children brought up in the New Creation Christian Community are not totally separated from the outside world." The Jesus Fellowship's children attended state schools.

== Beliefs ==
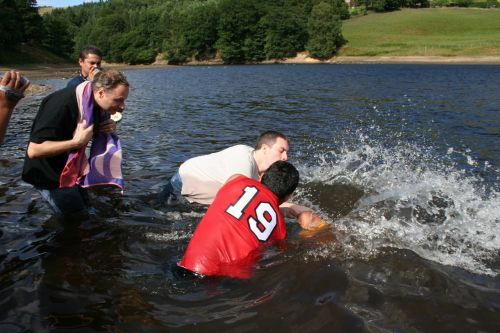
Open-air believer's baptism by the Jesus Army

The Jesus Fellowship upheld the historic creeds of the Christian faith. The creeds are a set of common beliefs shared with many other Christian churches, and consist of the Apostles' Creed, the Athanasian Creed and the Nicene Creed. It believed in baptism in water and the Holy Spirit, in the Bible as the Word of God, and in acceptance of charismatic gifts. The Jesus Fellowship defined their Christian beliefs in the following statement:

The Jesus Fellowship Church, which is also known as the Jesus Army and includes the New Creation Christian Community, upholds the historic Christian faith, being reformed, evangelical and charismatic. It practises believer's baptism and the New Testament reality of Christ's Church; believing in Almighty God: Father, Son and Holy Spirit; in the full divinity, atoning death and bodily resurrection of the Lord Jesus Christ; in the Bible as God's word, fully inspired by the Holy Spirit.

This Church desires to witness to the Lordship of Jesus Christ over and in His Church; and, by holy character, righteous society and evangelical testimony to declare that Jesus Christ, Son of God, the only Saviour, is the way, the truth and the life, and through Him alone can we find and enter the kingdom of God.

This church proclaims free grace, justification by faith in Christ and the sealing and sanctifying baptism in the Holy Spirit.

=== Theology and economics ===
Underwriting much of the Jesus Fellowship's beliefs and practices was a theology of the new creation. Regeneration brought the individual into a spiritual family that incorporated and transcended the biological family. Critics claimed that this had the potential to break up the natural family, but the Jesus Fellowship maintained that many relationships with parents were strengthened and that the Fellowship encouraged (and the community paid for) community members to visit relatives, including visits overseas if family members were abroad. In line with this basic theology, all members were deemed as equal in an economic sense. There was little by way of private property for those who lived in community. Jesus Fellowship community members aimed to "eschew worldly belongings and seek what is perceived as a simple and more ethical form of economic life". Prosperity theology espoused by many ministries originating in the United States was singled out for particular scorn. Wealth was not regarded as a blessing, particularly for the individual. An official Jesus Fellowship publication stated that "the love of money brings selfishness in human hearts". As far as the Fellowship was concerned, "wealth for Jesus" meant to benefit of the whole church and the deprived individuals it served. The wealth deposited in the common purse included members' incomes and salaries. Approximately half of this wealth was used for the needs of the community itself and to fund evangelising endeavour. The other half was re-invested in the fellowship's businesses or in paying off bank loans for new business ventures. In many respects the economic structure of the Jesus Fellowship might be said to have been "socialist" in orientation and is most readily seen in the property-less community and the philosophy of "each according to their need". One writer described the Jesus Fellowship as "careful with both members and money". New community members were required to be over 21 and had to live in a community for a probationary period for two years before being allowed to commit themselves to full community membership. Although New Creation Christian Community members donated all their money to the Community Trust fund, if they later decided to leave the community, their capital was paid back, sometimes with interest. New Creation Christian Community kept its running expenses and its capital completely separate, and has its accounts audited by an international firm of accountants.

== Abuse ==
=== Sexual, physical, emotional and financial abuse ===
Some leaders and members of the Jesus Fellowship committed abuse of children and vulnerable adults, with Noel Stanton and other leaders of the group accused of committing abuse. Several former members were found guilty of sexual abuse of children. Karl Skinner was given a suspended prison sentence for inappropriate behaviour with a young boy, and Alan Carter was sentenced to three years in prison for sex acts on a boy aged between 14 and 16 in the 1990s.

After Noel Stanton's death in 2009, the church supplied allegations to Northamptonshire Police of sexual offences against Stanton and others, who carried out "Operation Lifeboat"; as of 2019 there were 43 complainants of historic sexual and physical abuse. Police appealed for reports, but most came from people who had not themselves suffered abuse; some alleged victims could not be traced, and others denied abuse, or did not want police action.

Ten people from the church were convicted of sex offences, and a report concluded that abuse of women and children was covered up by senior members. A Jesus Fellowship Survivors Association represents about 800 alleged victims; they found that Operation Lifeboat had "barely scratched the surface" of what had happened. After resisting allegations, leaders were forced in 2019 to acknowledge that there were serious allegations against Stanton, and the Apostolic Five stepped down. Membership dwindled to about 1,000 ageing members, hitting finances—a senior leader said that there was a growing feeling that the fellowship was "too broken to fix". The Jesus Fellowship Community Trust closed in December 2020 following the scandal, and issued a Closure Statement including an unreserved apology for the abuse that occurred in the Jesus Fellowship Church (JFC) and the residential New Creation Christian Community (NCCC).

The Jesus Fellowship Redress Scheme was available to those who have suffered harm, abuse and/or adverse experiences within the Jesus Fellowship community. The Redress Scheme closed for new applications on 31 December 2023; applications received continued to be processed. The scheme to compensate members identified 539 alleged perpetrators of alleged abuse and revealed about one in six children had been sexually abused. 601 individuals applied for damages, though the trust recognised the true number of victims was likely to be greater. A total of £7.7m has been paid directly to applicants of the scheme. The trust accepted ultimate responsibility for 264 alleged abusers, 61 percent of them former leaders. Some twelve former members of the Jesus Fellowship Church have been convicted for indecent assaults and other offences.

A former member said in 2025 that ex-members "make little inside jokes about The Handmaid's Tale, because the language was so similar."

== Controversy ==
=== Baptist Union and Evangelical Alliance membership ===
From its inception, the Jesus Army aroused controversy. The original Bugbrooke Jesus Fellowship had long been a part of the Baptist Union. However, the sudden expansion in members made the new church a nationwide movement. This took it out of the ambit of the Baptist Union, which places authority within a specific congregation. The JA was also accused of "isolationism", epitomised by the JA practice of sometimes rebaptising new members who had already been baptised by other Baptist churches, implying that Christian baptism elsewhere may have been invalid. Consequently, in 1986 the Jesus Army was expelled from the Baptist Union, leaving it on the margins of the Baptist denomination. In 1982, the Jesus Fellowship had joined the Evangelical Alliance, one of whose membership requirements was that the church remain in close fellowship with other local evangelical churches. Earlier in 1986, the Evangelical Alliance had launched an inquiry into the beliefs and practices of the Jesus Fellowship Church and found that it no longer qualified for membership, citing much the same problems as did the Baptist Union later that year but at least as relevant in both cases was the fact that the rise of the JA came at a time when an international welter of anti-cult activity was under way. Allegations that the JA had too authoritarian a style of leadership and that members were under pressure to commit to lifelong celibacy, together with the corporal punishment of children ('rodding') was practised, and that community members were required to hand over their material possessions, left them vulnerable to accusations of cultic practices. Their intense style and requirement of totalitarian commitment led to some allegations of abuse from disillusioned former members, and some hostility from more conventional churchgoers. A number of churches within the Evangelical Alliance threatened to leave if the Jesus Fellowship Church was allowed to remain a member.

During the late 1980s and 1990s, the Jesus Fellowship improved its relationships with other churches, and broadened its membership so that community residents became a minority of the church. At the same time it re-examined its practices and loosened its style, with the result that when it reapplied for membership of the Evangelical Alliance in 1999 it received endorsements from both local and national church leaders and was accepted into membership later in the year. It never re-applied for membership of the Baptist Union, though a number of key Baptist ministers spoke at Jesus Fellowship events. Despite the entry of the Jesus Army into the charismatic mainstream, the church still attracted a range of views and anti-cult groups like the Cult Information Centre, FAIR and Reachout Trust still included the Jesus Army on their lists.

Writing in 1998, Stephen Hunt summed up the outlook of the wider charismatic Christian fraternity on the Jesus Fellowship at that time as follows: "To some in the broader movement, the Jesus Fellowship will always be something of an enigma, tending towards exclusiveness and displaying a sectarianism incongruent with contemporary Pentecostalism. To others, the Jesus Fellowship will continue to epitomize the fullest expression of Christian and Pentecostal life."

== In popular culture ==
The Jesus Army has been the focus of multiple media treatments in recent years, including:

- A seven-part podcast as part of the BBC's In Detail series, The Jesus Army Cult explores the rise, operations and eventual disintegration of the Jesus Army/Fellowship, framed by interviews with former members and survivors.
- A two-part BBC documentary, Inside the Cult of the Jesus Army, was commissioned by BBC Factual and aired on BBC Two / made available on BBC iPlayer in 2025. The series employed survivor testimony alongside archival materials to trace how the group evolved from communal idealism to authoritarian control and systemic abuse.

== See also ==
- List of churches in Northampton
