= Ray Comfort =

New Zealand-born evangelical minister (born 1949)

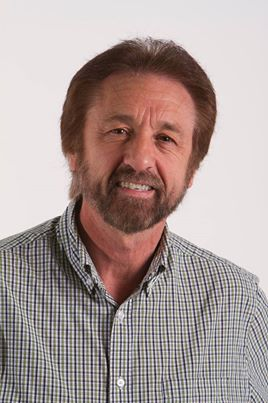
- Born: 5 December 1949 (age 76); Christchurch, New Zealand
- Citizenship: United States
- Occupations: Protestant evangelist, author, television host
- Known for: The Way of the Master, Living Waters Publications, Protestant evangelism
- Children: 3
- Website: www.livingwaters.com/team/ray-comfort/

Ray Comfort (born 5 December 1949) is a New Zealand–born evangelical minister, evangelist and young Earth creationist who lives in the United States. Comfort started Living Waters Publications, as well as the ministry The Way of the Master, in Bellflower, California, and has written several books.

== Early life ==
According to Comfort's autobiography, his parents put "Methodist" on his birth certificate but he was given no religious instruction as a child. Comfort identifies himself as both Christian and Jewish.

== Career ==
In 1989, Comfort accepted an invitation to join the pastoral staff at the non-denominational Calvary Chapel in Southern California.

=== The Way of the Master ministry ===
In the mid-1990s Comfort persuaded Kirk Cameron, star of the cancelled hit sitcom Growing Pains, to become an evangelist. In 2002, the pair formed an organization called the Way of the Master, with the intention of teaching the church to more effectively preach the message of evangelical Christianity.

Comfort says that evangelism is the main reason the Christian Church exists and that many of the evangelistic methods used over the last century have produced false conversions to Christianity. Comfort often uses the Ten Commandments to speak about sin before presenting the gospel of Jesus. In the mid-1980s he formulated two sermons entitled "Hell's Best Kept Secret" and "True and False Conversions."

Comfort speaks professionally at churches and evangelism seminars, and preaches in Huntington Beach, California. As well as co-hosting the former The Way of the Master Radio with Kirk Cameron, he is co-host of The Way of the Master Television Show.

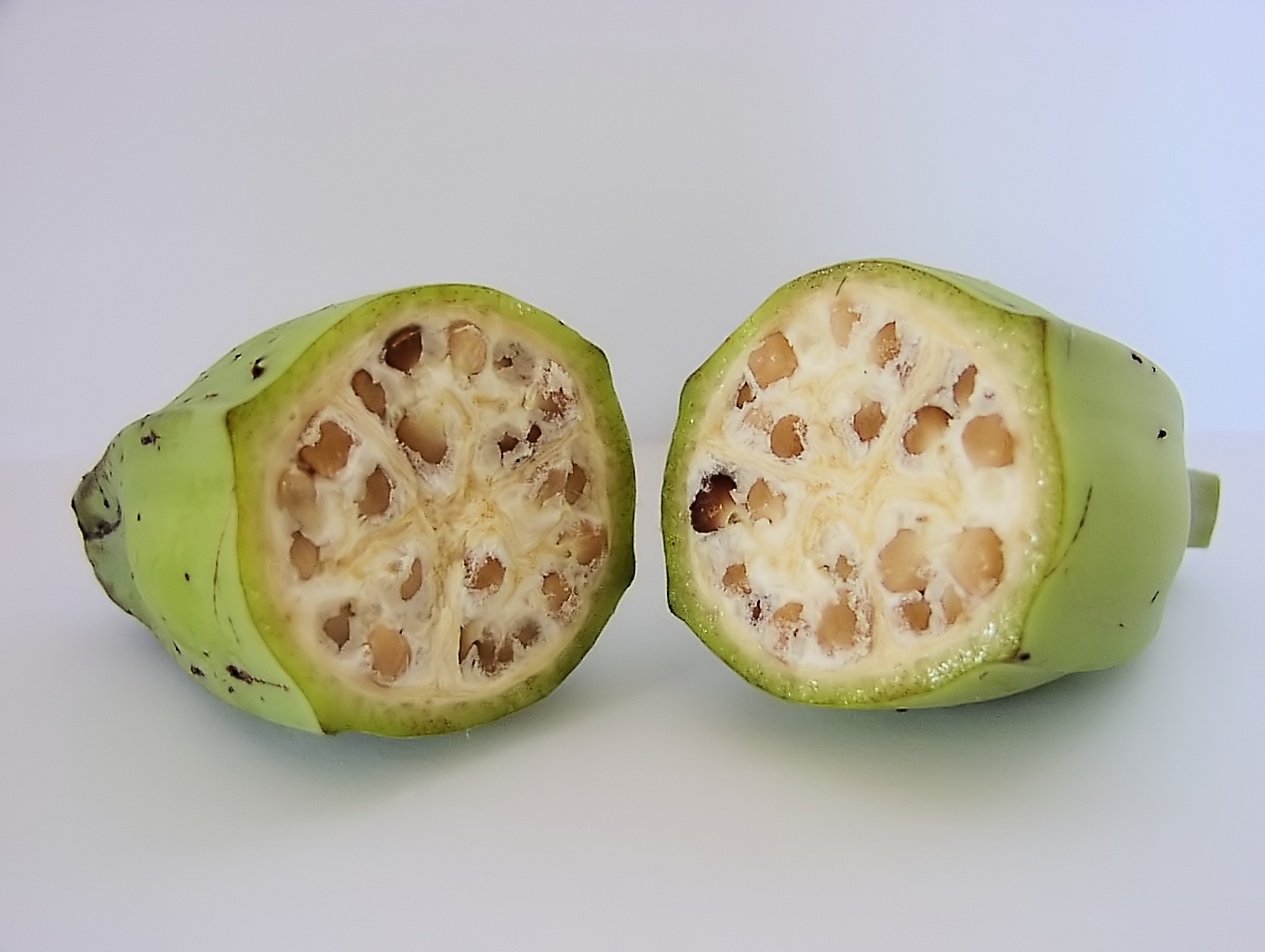
Wild bananas are inedible, in part due to seeds.

In 2006, Comfort recorded a segment for The Way of the Master's television show in which he claimed that the banana was "the atheist's nightmare", arguing that it displayed many user-friendly features that were evidence of intelligent design. Comfort retracted the video and claims upon learning that the banana is a result of artificial selection by humans, and that the wild banana (Musa acuminata) is small and unpalatable.

=== Debates ===
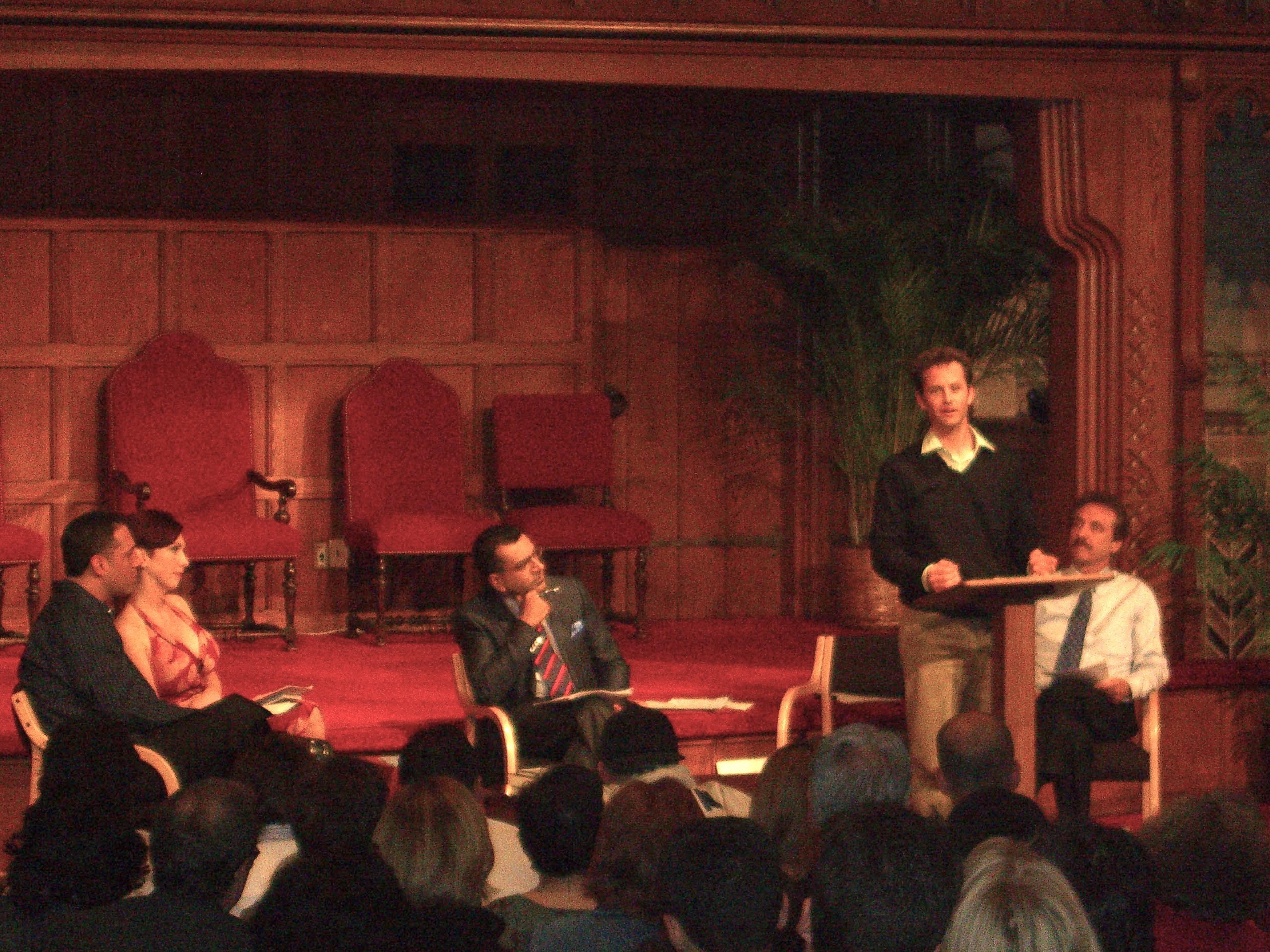
Comfort, seated behind Kirk Cameron, at a debate on the existence of God at Calvary Baptist Church in Manhattan, 5 May 2007

On 13 April 2001, Comfort appeared at the 27th National Convention of American Atheists in Orlando, Florida, where he debated Ron Barrier, the National Spokesperson for American Atheists. Comfort later stated that "they laughed at my humor, and although there was unified mockery at some of the things that I said, I was able to go through the Ten Commandments, the fact of Judgment Day, the reality of Hell, the Cross, and the necessity of repentance, and no one stopped me."

On 5 May 2007, Comfort and Cameron participated in a televised debate with Brian Sapient and Kelly O'Connor of the Rational Response Squad, at Calvary Baptist Church in Manhattan. The debate, which was moderated by Nightline correspondent Martin Bashir, focused on the existence of God, which Comfort claimed he could prove scientifically without relying on the Bible. During the debate, Cameron and Comfort both denied Charles Darwin's theory of evolution.

== Publications ==
=== Tracts ===
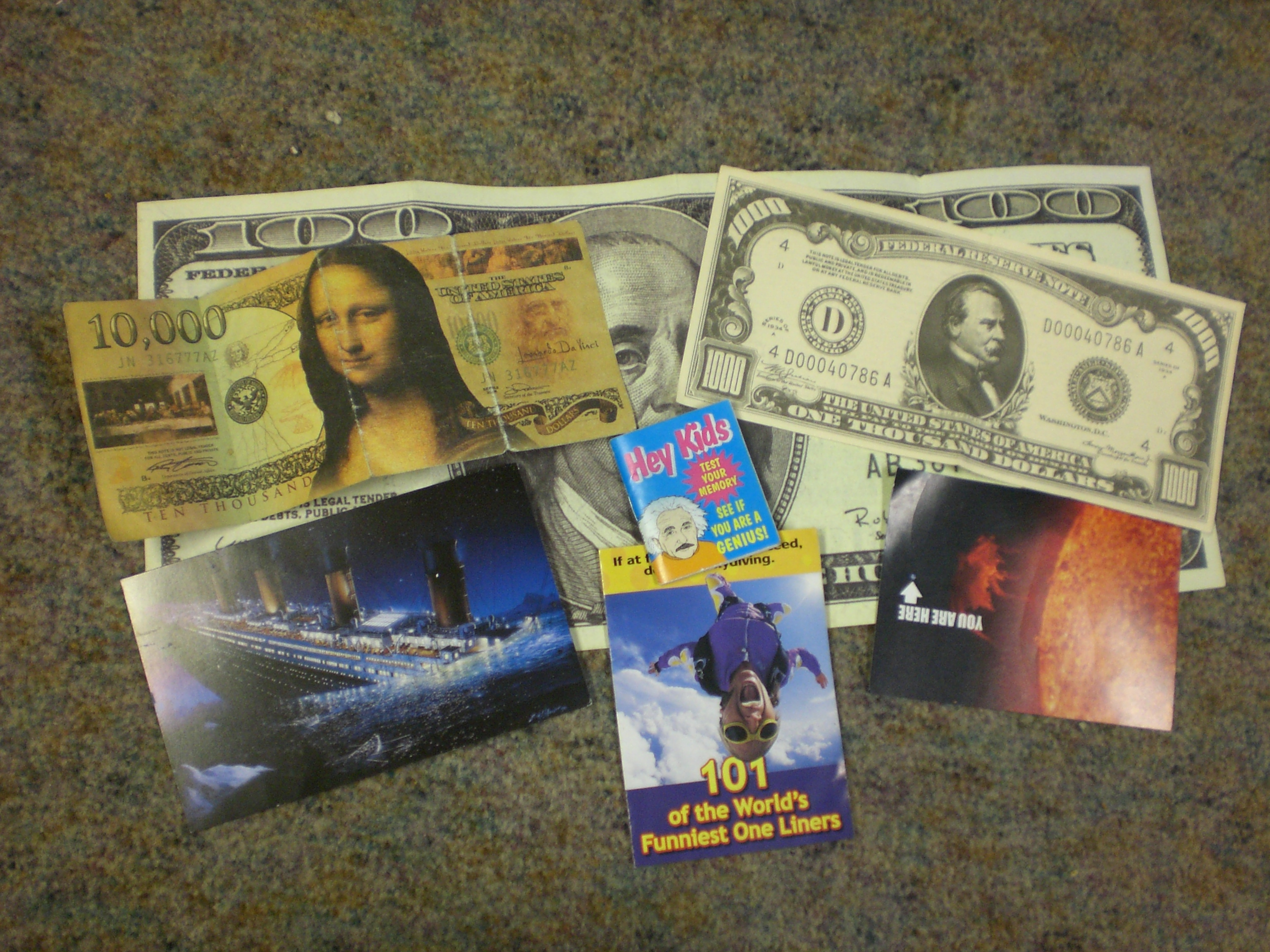
Gospel tracts produced by Ray Comfort's ministry, Living Waters

According to Comfort, he has designed dozens of gospel tracts since the 1970s, and sells millions of Living Waters tracts each year. Some of his tracts are designed to resemble paper money, including fake $100, $1,000 and $1 million bills. Others employ novelties intended to amuse, such as a "ticket to heaven" that invites the reader to tear it if they do not need it; the ticket is printed on a type of plastic, making it difficult to rip. The tracts typically attempt to persuade the reader that on judgment day, they will certainly be found guilty of breaking one or more of the Ten Commandments, and therefore will be sent to hell, unless they say a prayer to acknowledge Christ's substitutionary atonement.

In June 2006, agents of the US Secret Service confiscated thousands of Ray Comfort's "Million Dollar Bill" gospel tracts from Darrel Rundus, president of Great News Network. A federal district court judge ruled that the tracts, which were marked as "not legal tender", did not violate federal law and ordered their return.

In October 2010, The New Zealand Herald reported that elderly people received "appointment cards" by Comfort's California-based publishing company, Living Waters, asking them to fill out information regarding the date and time of their deaths, and advising them to contact evangelists in order to avoid hell. Recipients of these cards expressed anger and horror over receiving them, and contacted police over the matter, with one of them commenting, "It's disgusting. It was quite spooky. I just couldn't comprehend why anyone would ask you to predict the date of your death." The New Zealand Herald summarized a statement from Living Waters spokesperson Lisa Law as saying that "the cards were a way of raising awareness of human mortality in order to spark discussion about Jesus", and that Law "did not know who sent [the tracts]".

=== Books ===
Ray Comfort has authored more than 80 books and tracts. His 2009 book You Can Lead an Atheist to Evidence, But You Can't Make Him Think, ranked #1 in Amazon.com's atheism and apologetics categories when it debuted in February 2009.

==== Abridged version of On the Origin of Species ====
In November 2009, Comfort released an edited and abridged version of Charles Darwin's On the Origin of Species, with a 50-page foreword containing creationist arguments against the theory of evolution. The book was given away for free at selected schools around the United States. Stan Guffey, a biologist at the University of Tennessee, alleged that most of Comfort's foreword was plagiarised from Darwin himself.

According to Comfort's website, "nothing has been removed from Darwin's original work", but Eugenie C. Scott, executive director of the National Center for Science Education (NCSE), noted that Comfort deleted four chapters by Darwin that described the evidence for evolution, adding that two of the omitted chapters, Chapters 11 and 12, showcased biogeography, some of Darwin's strongest evidence for evolution. She wrote that Comfort's foreword is "a hopeless mess of long-ago-refuted creationist arguments, teeming with misinformation about the science of evolution, populated by legions of strawmen, and exhibiting what can be charitably described as muddled thinking".

On his website, Comfort said that the four chapters were chosen at random to be omitted in order to make the book small enough to be affordable as a giveaway, with the absent chapters available for download, and that the missing chapters were included in the second edition, which had a smaller text size that made printing the entire book as a giveaway affordable. The second edition still lacks Darwin's preface and glossary of terms. The NCSE arranged a campaign at colleges across the US to distribute an analysis of the Comfort introduction, a one-page flier, and "the NCSE Safety Bookmark" in the shape of a banana, a reference to Comfort's presentation of the banana as an argument for intelligent design and the existence of God.

==== List of books published ====
- — (1989). Hell's Best Kept Secret. Whitaker House. ISBN 978-0883682067.
- — (1993). God Doesn't Believe in Atheists (revised ed.). Bridge Logos Publishers. ISBN 978-0882709222.
- —; Cameron, Kirk (2006). The Way of the Master. Bridge Logos Publishers. ISBN 978-0882702209.
- — (2008). Evolution: A Fairy Tale for Grownups. Bridge Logos Publishers. ISBN 978-0882704326.
- — (2008). World Religions in a Nutshell. Bridge Logos Publishers. ISBN 978-0882706696.
- Darwin, Charles (September 2009). Comfort, Ray (ed.). The Origin of Species (150th Anniversary ed.). Bridge Logos Publishers. ISBN 978-0882709192.
- — (2009). You Can Lead an Atheist to Evidence, But You Can't Make Him Think: Answers to Questions from Angry Skeptics. WND Books. ISBN 978-1935071068.
- —; LaHaye, Tim (2012). Hitler, God, and the Bible. WND Books. ISBN 978-1936488247.

== Film ==
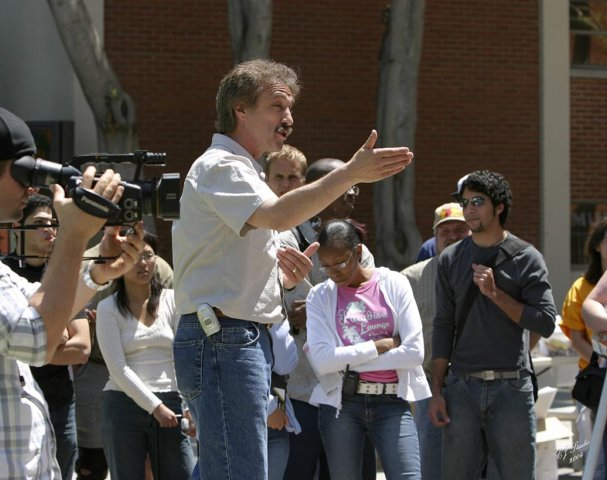
Ray Comfort open-air preaching at a Great News Network evangelism boot camp in 2004

In 2011, Comfort wrote and produced a 33-minute documentary film called 180: Changing the Heart of a Nation. The film was criticized by The Huffington Post for its comparison of legalized abortion to the Holocaust.

Comfort's 2016 film The Atheist Delusion premiered at the Ark Encounter, a Christian theme park operated by the young Earth creationist organization Answers in Genesis on 22 October 2016.

=== Filmography ===
- The Secrets of Nostradamus Exposed (1995): Writer, producer
- True Fiction (1999): Writer
- The Way of the Master series (2003–14): Self – Host, writer, producer
- 180: Changing the Heart of a Nation (2011): Self, writer, producer
- Genius (2012): Self, writer, director
- Evolution vs. God: Shaking the Foundations of Faith (2013): Self, director
- Noah and the Last Days (2014): Director, producer, writer, self, runner, sound
- Audacity (2015): Writer, executive producer
- The Atheist Delusion (2016): Executive producer
- Exit: The Appeal of Suicide (2017): Narrator, Writer, Executive producer
- 7 Reasons (2019): Self, executive producer
