= Ché Ahn =

American pastor and religious leader (born 1956)

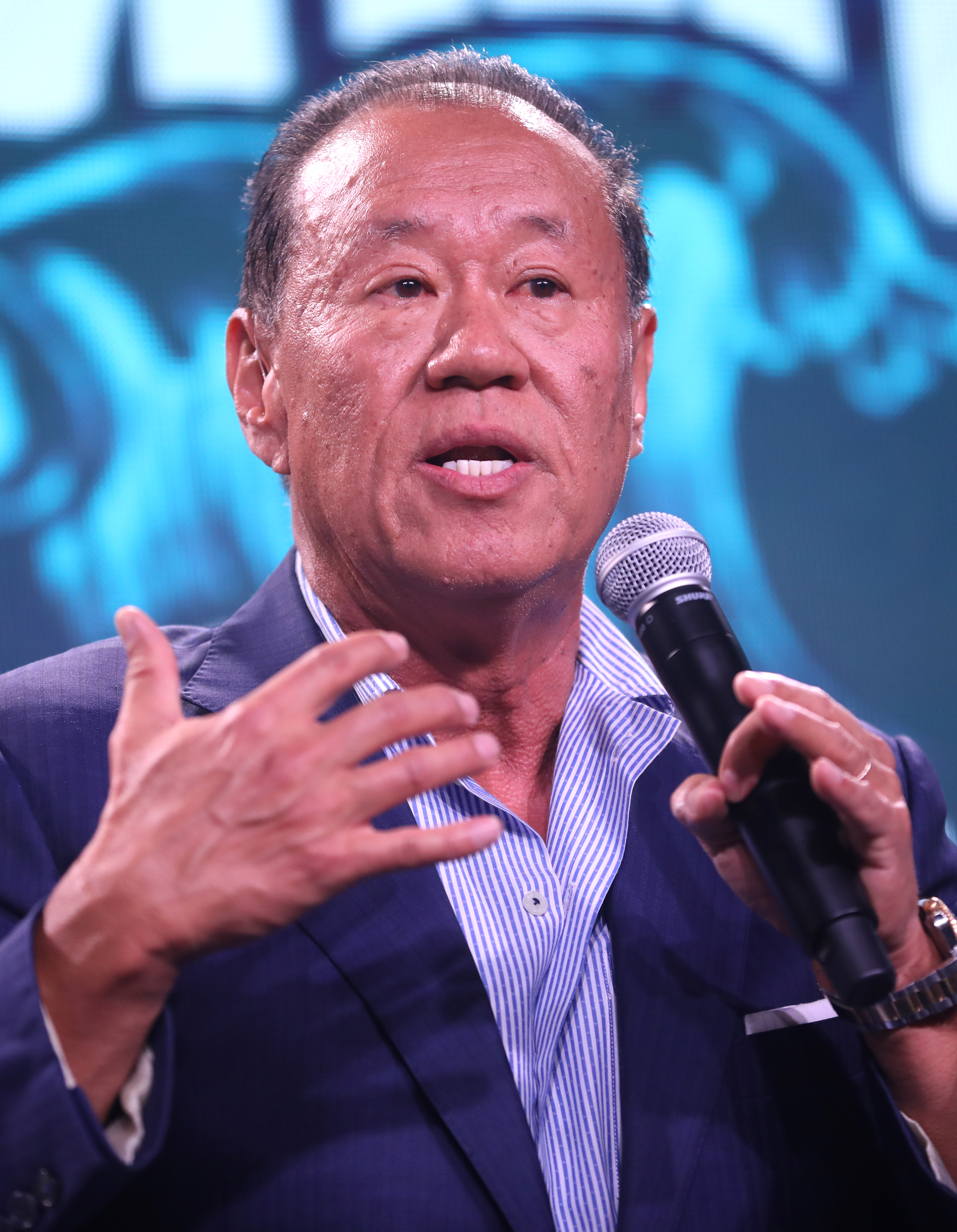
- Church: Harvest Rock Church

Personal details
- Born: January 17, 1956 (age 70) South Korea
- Denomination: Charismatic Movement
- Spouse: Susan Ahn
- Occupation: Pastor, writer
- Education: Fuller Theological Seminary (MDiv, DMin)
- Political party: Republican

- Ché Ahn
- Hangul: 안재호
- Hanja: 安宰浩
- Revised Romanization: An Jaeho
- McCune–Reischauer: An Chaeho

Ché Ahn (Korean: 안재호; born January 17, 1956) is a Korean-American evangelical pastor. Along with his wife, Sue Ahn, he founded Harvest Rock Church in Pasadena, California, in 1994. Originally a small, multi-ethnic congregation, Harvest Rock Church has grown into a megachurch emphasizing supernatural experiences, love, and equipping believers for revival and societal reformation. Ahn also established Harvest International Ministry in 1996, an apostolic network that connects over 25,000 churches and ministries across more than 60 countries.

As a child, Ahn immigrated to the United States with his family after the Korean War. A spiritual encounter at age seventeen redirected his path toward Christian ministry. Ahn earned a Master of Divinity and a Doctor of Ministry from Fuller Theological Seminary. He was mentored by C. Peter Wagner, who introduced him to apostolic leadership and spiritual warfare, shaping his approach to church growth and global outreach. Ahn serves as the International Chancellor of Wagner University. He is a key figure in the New Apostolic Reformation movement, promoting apostolic and prophetic governance over traditional church structures while emphasizing strategic spiritual warfare and advocating the Seven Mountain Mandate for Christians to influence societal spheres.

== Early life and education ==
Ché Ahn immigrated from South Korea to the United States as a young child following the Korean War. His father, a Southern Baptist minister, was allowed entry shortly after his son's birth, but Ahn, his mother, and his brother were only allowed to immigrate two years after in 1958. The family faced financial struggles and language barriers during his youth. He was raised by parents who heavily emphasized high academic performance, which contributed to teenage rebellion and substance abuse as he navigated cultural assimilation and strict parental expectations.

Ahn experienced a spiritual conversion at age seventeen during a rock concert witnessing event. During this experience, he reported feeling Holy Spirit manifestations, including physical trembling and emotional release. Although he initially dismissed these reactions as hysteria, he later accepted them as a divine intervention that resolved his bitterness toward his father and led him to recommit to Christianity.

Inspired by his conversion, Ahn enrolled at Fuller Theological Seminary in Pasadena, California, to pursue theological studies, eventually completing a Master of Divinity and a Doctor of Ministry. During this time, he formed a significant mentorship with C. Peter Wagner, who taught him about apostolic ministry and strategic spiritual warfare, defining his future leadership style within church networks and revival initiatives.

== Ministry ==
Ahn founded Harvest Rock Church in Pasadena, California, in 1994 alongside his wife, Sue Ahn. Beginning as a small, multi-ethnic home group on the grounds of the Ambassador Auditorium, it has developed into a large congregation dedicated to empowering believers for revival through teachings on supernatural experiences, love, and societal reformation.

In 1996, Ahn established Harvest International Ministry as an apostolic network. Initially linking fourteen churches, the organization expanded to connect twenty-five thousand churches and ministries across more than sixty countries, focused on advancing global outreach and equipping leaders. Ahn became a prominent figure in the New Apostolic Reformation movement, which emerged in 1996. The movement promotes apostolic and prophetic governance over traditional church denominations, emphasizes strategic spiritual warfare against territorial spirits, and advocates the Seven Mountain Mandate. This mandate calls for Christians to attain leadership positions within seven major societal spheres: government, religion, media, arts, education, family, and business.

In 2000, Ahn served as a leader in the evangelical youth movement TheCall, organizing large-scale prayer rallies. This included TheCall DC on the National Mall, where thousands of Christian youths gathered for fasting, repentance, and prayer for societal transformation based on biblical values. The event featured consecutive schedules of speakers, preachers, singers, and dancers.

In 2010, Ahn succeeded founder C. Peter Wagner as the International Chancellor of Wagner University in Rancho Cucamonga, California, where he focused on training believers for practical ministry through teachings on apostolic leadership, prophecy, and spiritual warfare. Throughout his career, Ahn has ministered extensively worldwide, teaching and training individuals in revivalism, healing, and evangelism.

== Books ==
Ahn authored Fire Evangelism: Reaching the Lost Through Love And Power, published in 2006, which focuses on combining compassion with supernatural demonstrations to share faith with non-believers. He wrote Spirit-Led Evangelism: Reaching the Lost through Love and Power in 2008, exploring how believers can rely on the guidance of the Holy Spirit to evangelize through empathy and miraculous signs. In 2009, Ahn published When Heaven Comes Down: Experiencing God's Glory in Your Life, discussing the spiritual purpose of divine revelations in fostering holiness and personal transformation.

Ahn also released Say Goodbye to Powerless Christianity: Walking in Supernatural Surrender and Significance in 2009, encouraging readers to move away from rigid religious practices in favor of a life yielded to the Holy Spirit. In 2013, he penned The Grace of Giving: Unleashing the Power of a Generous Heart, which teaches biblical principles of generosity and financial stewardship. Throughout his writings, Ahn maintains that believers are called to lead across all societal realms to counter humanistic influences, reflecting his commitment to the Seven Mountains Mandate within the New Apostolic Reformation framework.

== Political activities and views ==
Ahn has supported Donald Trump since 2016, aligning with political efforts such as the Stop the Steal movement after the 2020 presidential election. He spoke at a January 5, 2021, rally in Washington, D.C., where he used spiritual metaphors to declare that believers would change the political landscape under Jesus Christ's lordship while warning of consequences if Joe Biden or Kamala Harris assumed the presidency. Religious studies scholar Matthew D. Taylor described Ahn's presence at the rally as an effort to mobilize religious supporters using apostolic terminology.

During the COVID-19 pandemic, Ahn challenged California's COVID-19 restrictions on religious gatherings by holding indoor, in-person services at Harvest Rock Church despite public health orders from Governor Gavin Newsom. Facing potential fines and legal penalties, Ahn filed lawsuits arguing that the mandates violated the constitutional right to religious freedom. This resulted in a Supreme Court ruling and a subsequent settlement in which the state paid $1.35 million in legal fees and agreed to treat houses of worship equally to secular institutions during future public health emergencies. Ahn argued that the public health closures were rooted in secular and ideological shifts aimed at weakening church influence in society.

On August 2, 2025, Ahn announced his candidacy for Governor of California in the 2026 election, running as a Republican during a rally in Pasadena. He framed his campaign around platforms of faith, family preservation, and fiscal conservatism, stating that his decision to run was a response to a spiritual calling. He reported experiencing a profound personal realization on April 28, 2025, that he should enter public service, which he felt was confirmed by a subsequent invitation to an event at the White House.

Ahn frequently uses religious and prophetic language to address cultural and political issues, including speaking at a National Mall rally on October 12, 2024, to endorse conservative political candidates. His political philosophy views civic involvement as a component of spiritual warfare, encouraging Christian believers to take active roles in governing societal institutions to align them with biblical principles.

Scholarly and media analyses have described Ahn's political involvement as part of a broader trend of New Apostolic Reformation and Charismatic leaders entering the political sphere to advance conservative social policies and religious freedom protections. His legal challenges against local lockdown ordinances significantly influenced regional jurisprudence surrounding constitutional religious liberties during the pandemic.

== Personal life ==
Ahn is married to Susan Roxas, known publicly as Sue Ahn. The Ahns have partnered in full-time ministry since co-founding Harvest Rock Church in 1994. They have four children: Gabriel, Grace, Joy, and Mary.
