= Grace Covenant =

Family of Christian churches

Grace Covenant (officially Grace Covenant International), a non-denominational network or "family" of Christian churches, missionaries and ministries founded in 1995, was created to offer relationship and accountability and "connection without control" for ministries. Constituent ministries maintain local autonomy, boards and a variety of styles, but share a unified vision of reaching the world for Christ. Member congregations and ministries consider themselves "interdependent", rather than independent; and appreciate the fourfold ministry focus: Evangelism, church planting, World Missions, and Spiritual Renewal.

Grace Covenant, in its core beliefs, is evangelical and open to the Spirit, embracing the balance of "Word and Power".

Currently there are churches in California, Washington, and Missouri; as well as parachurch ministries under GCI's covering. Mission works exist in the Dominican Republic, Paraguay, Peru, The Bahamas and Spain. GCI's Ministry Skills Institute offers practical ministry equipping through regional training conferences, Individual Training Tracks, Correspondence Courses, and other ministry resources. Grace Covenant continues to develop new works of ministries in the United States and around the world; and is especially open to adopting like-minded ministries into the ministry family.

== Heart values ==
Grace Covenant's official "heart values":

1. The Ministry of Jesus is the focus of the Church.
2. Worship is central in honoring and engaging our relationship.
3. Jesus is the Head of the Church.
4. The Word of God is central to faith and practice.
5. The Holy Spirit is the Church’s source (force) for comfort, guidance, renewal, power, service and evangelism with the Heavenly Father and provides an atmosphere for ministry.
6. The Fruit of the Spirit is the heart nature of the Church.
7. The Gifts of the Spirit are the ministry tools of the Church.
8. Ministry flows naturally through relationships.
9. Spiritual relationships provide mutual support, accountability and ministry impact.
10. God has called believers to be Kingdom minded, fulfilling our specific role in the Body, while affirming, assisting and laboring with other parts of His Body, for greater Kingdom work.
11. Believers are called to be culturally relevant, which is identifying and posturing ourselves with people as to meet their needs in the Name of Jesus.
12. The disciple of Jesus has a heart full of compassion and service toward the poor, orphaned, widowed and oppressed.
13. Ministry involves commitment to small groups.
