= The Way of the Master =

American Christian evangelism ministry

- Type: NGO
- Purpose: Evangelism
- Headquarters: Bellflower, California
- Leader: Ray Comfort, Kirk Cameron
- Parent organization: Living Waters Ministries
- Affiliations: Todd Friel

The Way of the Master (WOTM) is a United States-based Christian evangelism ministry, founded in 2002 and headed by New Zealand-born evangelist Ray Comfort, American actor Kirk Cameron and American radio host Todd Friel. The organization produces a television show, a radio show, books and tracts, an online course in evangelism, small-group training courses, and a website. The ministry's logo incorporates the letters, WDJD, standing for "What Did Jesus Do?" and a reference to Mark 16:15: "And he said unto them, Go ye into all the world, and preach the gospel to every creature."

The Way of the Master is an outreach of Living Waters Ministries, also headed by Comfort.

== Programs ==
=== Television series ===
The Way of the Master is a television show hosted by Cameron and Comfort. Production started in 2004. Currently, it has been released up to season four. WOTM is broadcast on the Trinity Broadcasting Network, FamilyNet, Sky Angel, Christian Television Network, along with other media outlets, and can be watched in more than 100 countries.

In 2006, Comfort recorded a segment for The Way of the Master's television show in which he argued that the banana was an "atheists' nightmare", arguing that it displayed many user-friendly features that were evidence of intelligent design. Comfort retracted the video and claims upon learning that the banana is a result of artificial selection by humans, and that the wild banana is small and unpalatable.

The show won the National Religious Broadcasters' People’s Choice 2004, 2005, 2006, and Best Program, 2005 and 2006.

=== Radio show ===
The Way of the Master Radio, WOTMR, was a syndicated two-hour, daily radio show hosted by former stand-up comedian Todd Friel. WOTMR was broadcast on various local radio outlets, internet streaming and on Sirius XM Radio. The show ran from January 2006 until November 2008, when it was renamed Wretched Radio, broadcast through FamilyNet. The Way of the Master Radio web link is no longer active for the ministry.

=== The Way of the Master Minute ===
The Way of the Master Minute was a series of one-minute Biblical radio sermonettes made between 2006 until 2008. They still continue to air on The Full Armor of God Broadcast.

== Living Waters Publications ==
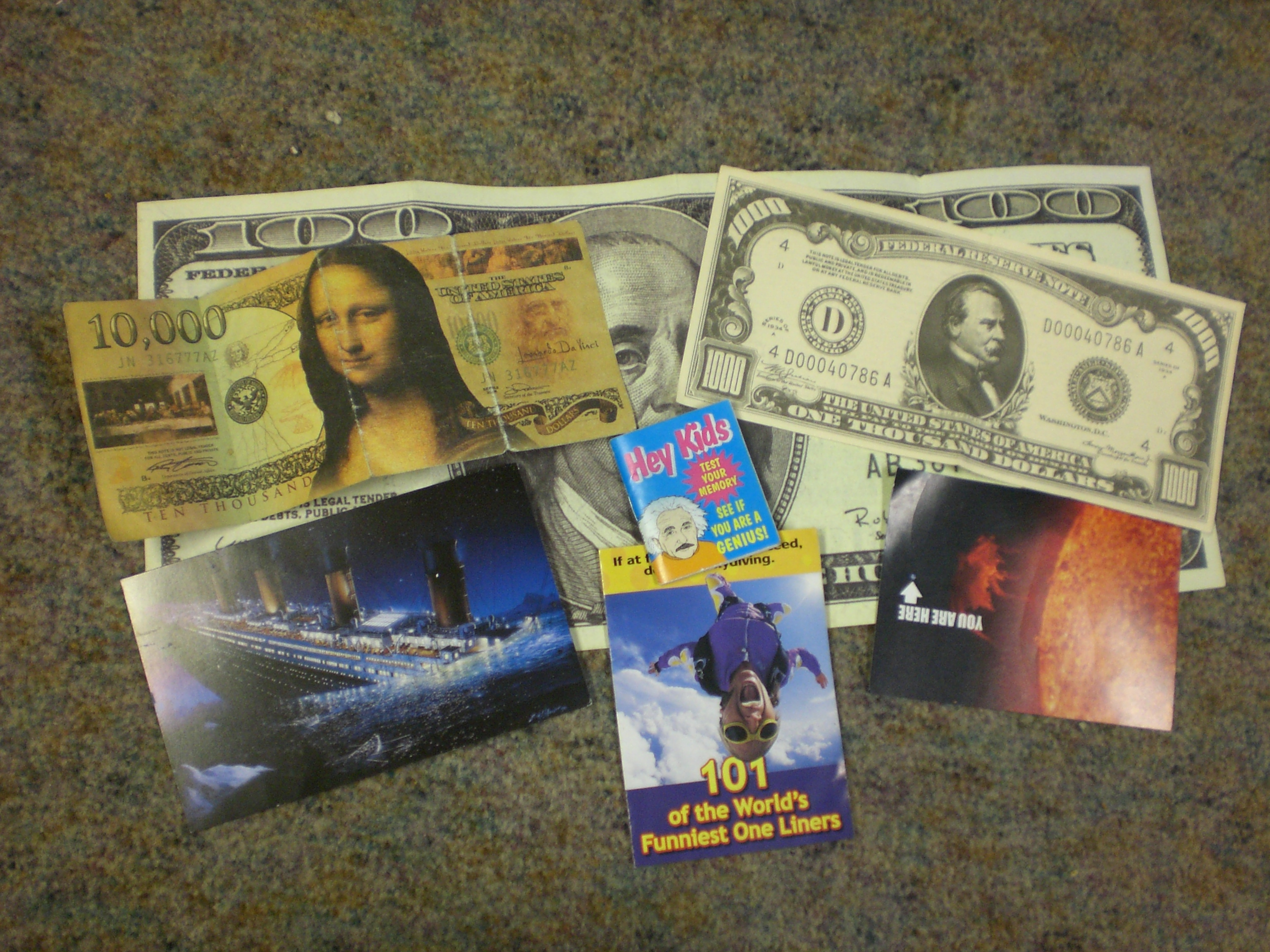
Various Living Waters-created Gospel tracts.

Living Waters Publications (LWP) acts as an online store for WOTM.

On June 6, 2006, the United States Secret Service seized 8,300 copies of the "million dollar bill" tract printed by Living Waters Publications from the Great News Network headquarters because a woman in North Carolina attempted to deposit the tracts as legal tender (despite the fake bills being marked "This is not legal tender").

== Debate with Rational Response Squad ==
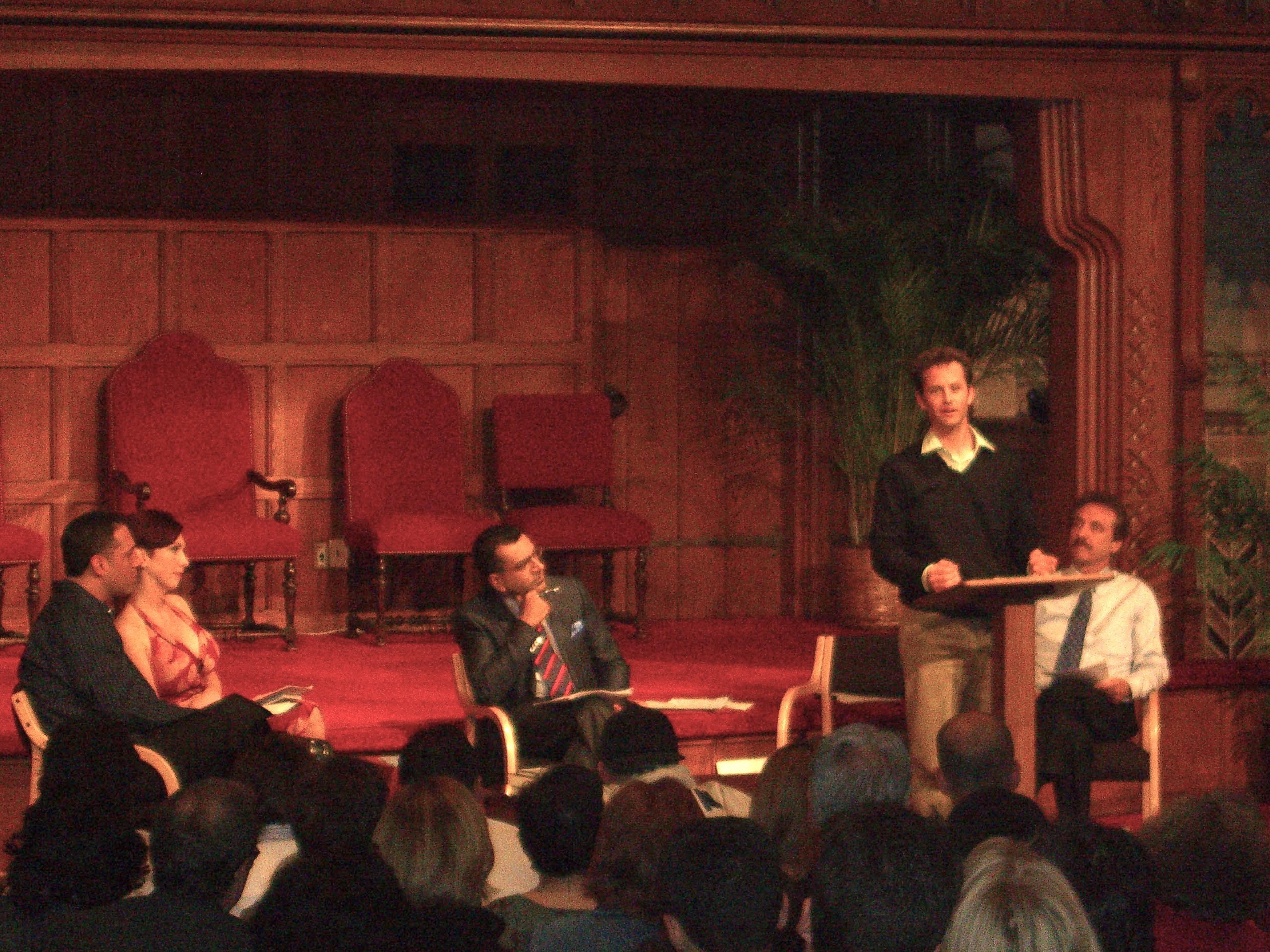
Kirk Cameron, speaking at the debate at Calvary Baptist Church, May 5, 2007. Seated from left to right are Rational Response Squad members Brian Sapient and Kelly O'Connor, Nightline anchor Martin Bashir, and Ray Comfort.

Cameron and Comfort participated in a debate with two members of the Rational Response Squad (RRS) atheist activism organization at Calvary Baptist Church in Manhattan, on May 5, 2007. Nightline correspondent Martin Bashir served as moderator at the event. Nightline aired the debate online and included a short two-segment summary on its May 9 broadcast. Cameron told the audience he would prove the existence of God scientifically, without resorting to faith. In reporting on the debate, Slate magazine claimed that Cameron's declaration to prove God would have made him the first to accomplish this feat in many centuries of religious thought, besting scholars such as Thomas Aquinas. Slate reported that RRS atheist debaters Brian and Kelly defeated the three main arguments of Cameron and Comfort which were: a) everything has a maker, b) the existence of the human conscience shows that there is a higher moral power, and c) Christ is revealed in the Gospel. Although numerous Christians claimed that Comfort and Cameron went to the debate "well-intentioned but unprepared", the two were also widely commended for having a very "positive demeanor" during the debate, in strong contrast to their opponents. In addition, some Christian debate viewers accused the moderator, Martin Bashir, of "being biased towards the atheist side."

== See also ==
- Open-air preaching
- Tract (literature)
