= Everyman's Welfare Service =

Australian charitable parachurch organization

- Formation: 1936
- Type: NGO
- Region served: Australia
- Official language: English
- Website: www.everymans.org.au
- Formerly called: Campaigners for Christ

Everyman's Welfare Service (also simply called Everyman's and formerly known as Campaigners for Christ, Campaigners, or C4C) is a parachurch organization that was founded in 1936 in Melbourne, Victoria, Australia. It provides opportunities for recreation to members of the military, operating recreation centres on most Australian Defence Force bases. It is affiliated with the National Young Life Campaign of England. As Campaigners for Christ, the organization engaged in open-air preaching and ran a centre in Port Moresby, Papua New Guinea. C4C owned a room in a building opposite Adelaide railway station in which they engaged in evangelism. Athol Richardson served as the C4C president during World War II. Evangelist Frank Jenner partnered with C4C, although he was not officially part of the organization. Eventually, the organization was renamed "Everyman's Welfare Service" in reference to Colossians 1:28.
