= Tract (literature) =

Literary work to convince somebody of an idea or belief

Tract
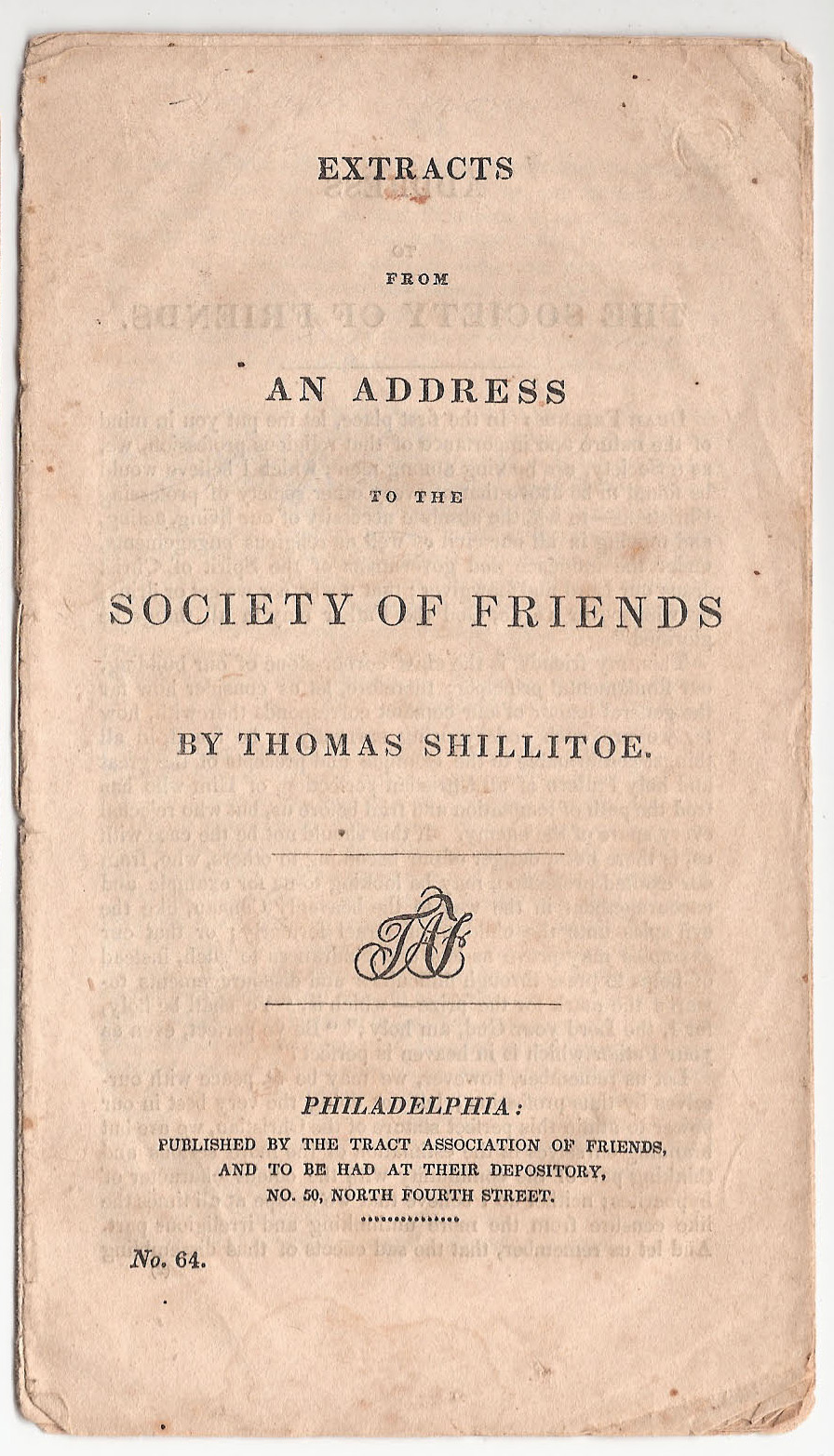
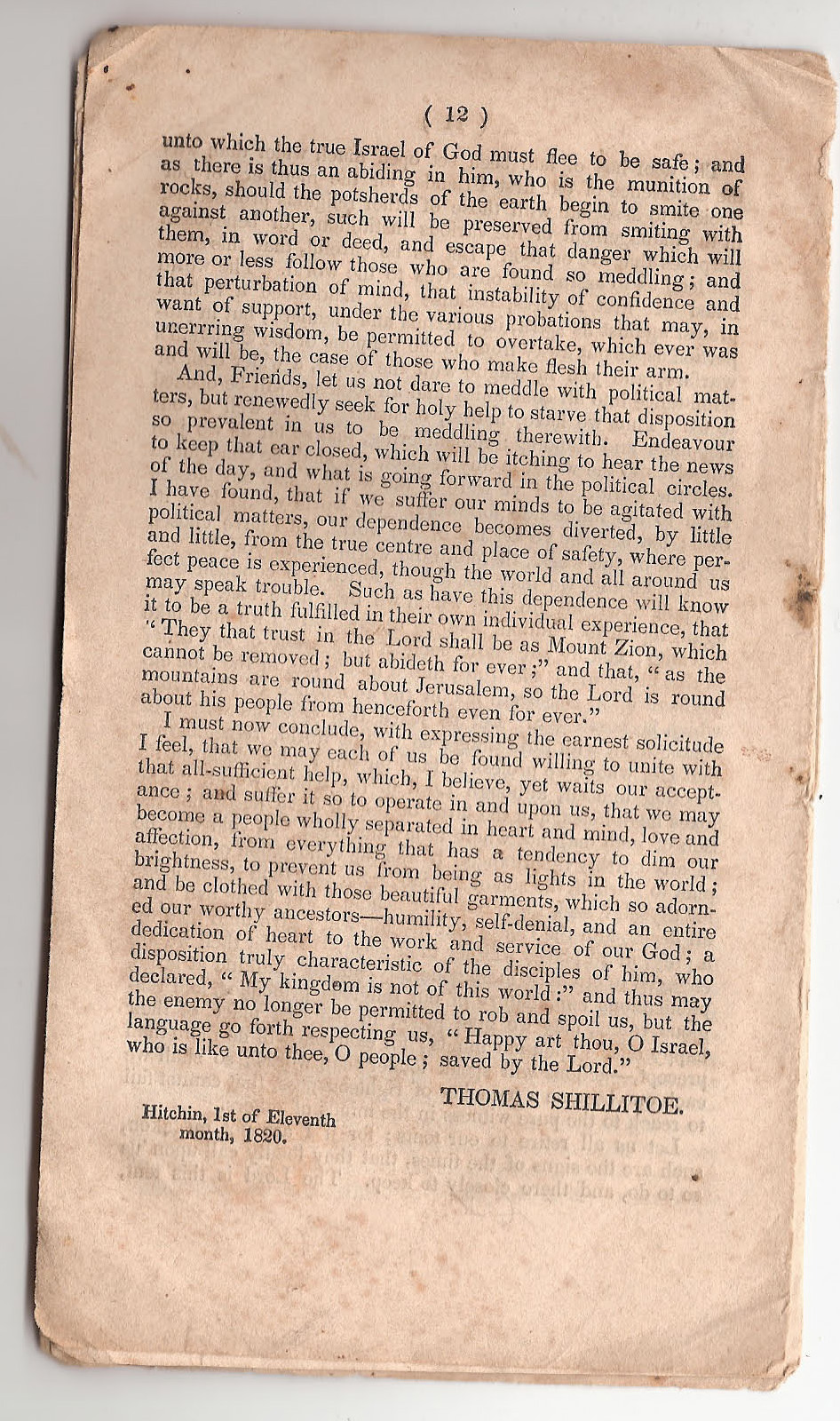
First and last page of a Quaker tract from 1820

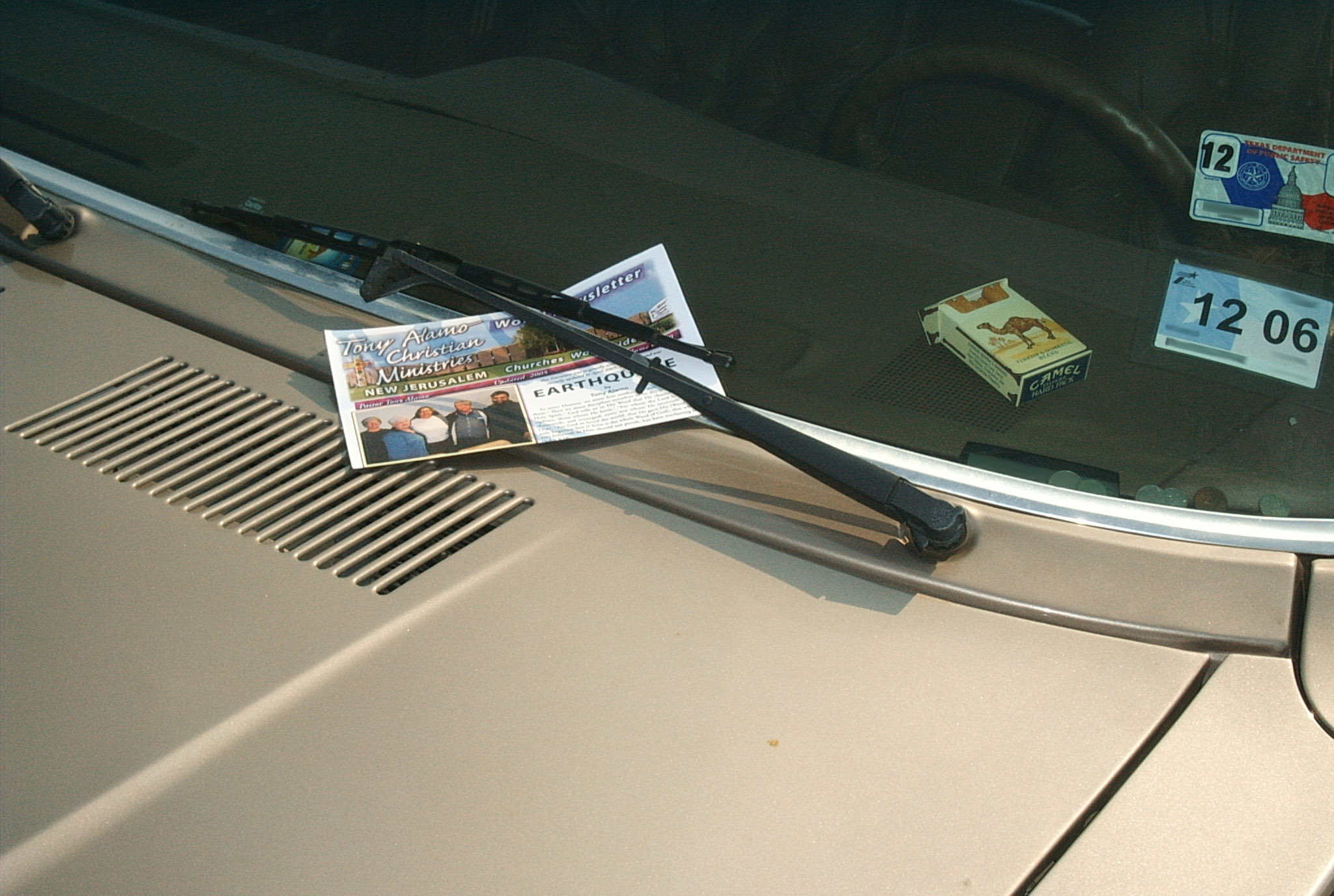
Tracts are often left in places with high amounts of human traffic. This tract was left on a vehicle, intended for the motorist.

A tract is a literary work and, in current usage, often religious in nature. The notion of what constitutes a tract has changed over time; by the early 21st century, the term refers to a brief pamphlet with religious or political themes. Tracts are often either left for someone to find or distributed as a medium of mass communication in the context of proselytism. However, there have been times in history when the term also implied much longer, tome-like works. The derivative tractate of scripture or the Talmud is the equivalent in Hebrew literature to a chapter of the Christian Bible.

== History ==
The distribution of tracts predates the development of the printing press, with the term being applied by scholars to religious and political works at least as early as the 7th century. They were used to disseminate the teachings of John Wycliffe in the 14th century. As a political tool, they proliferated throughout Europe during the 17th century. They have been printed as persuasive religious material since the invention of Johann Gutenberg's printing press, being widely utilised by Martin Luther during the start of the Protestant Reformation.

=== Religious tracts ===
As religious literature, tracts were used throughout the turbulence of the Reformation and the various upheavals of the 17th century. They came to such prominence again in the Oxford Movement for reform within the Church of England that the movement became known as "Tractarianism", after the publication in the 1830s and 1840s of a series of religious essays collectively called Tracts for the Times.

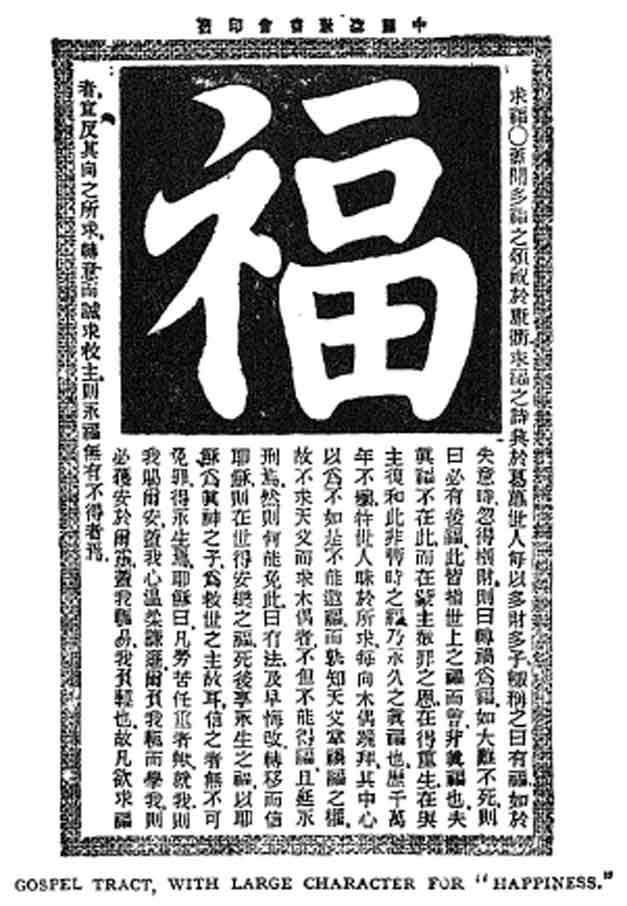
A gospel tract printed by the China Inland Mission, pre-1900

The Tracts were written by a group of Anglican clergy including John Henry Newman (later a Catholic cardinal and saint), John Keble, Henry Edward Manning, and Edward Pusey. The theological discourses within sought to establish continuity between the Church of England and the patristic period of church history. These vastly influenced Anglo-Catholicism, and varied in length from four to over 400 pages. An important center for the spreading of tracts was the London-based Religious Tract Society. Tracts were used both within England, affecting the conversion of pioneer missionary to Qing China, Hudson Taylor, as well as in the crosscultural missions that movements such as Taylor founded: the China Inland Mission.

Charles Spurgeon wrote many tracts, and in addition to these evangelical writings, his "Penny Sermons" were printed weekly and distributed widely by the millions and used in a similar way, and they still are today. In the United States, the American Tract Society distributed vast quantities of tracts in many of languages to newly arrived immigrants at Ellis Island, and sought to assist them in their struggles to adapt to their new country.

The publishing of tracts for religious purposes has continued unabated, with many Christian tract ministries, in particular, existing today. The American Tract Society has continuously published literature of this type since 1825; around Allhallowtide, around 3 million alone are purchased annually to be distributed by Christians.

By the late 19th century, Bible Students associated with Zion's Watch Tower Tract Society were distributing tens of millions of tracts each year; by the start of World War I, they had distributed hundreds of millions of tracts in dozens of languages worldwide. Now named Watchtower and Bible Tract Society, the organisation continues to publish hundreds of millions of religious tracts in over 400 languages, which are distributed by Jehovah's Witnesses.

As evangelistic tools, tracts became prominent in the Jesus movement. One of the most widely distributed, and one that continues to be handed out en masse, is "The Four Spiritual Laws" authored by Bill Bright of Campus Crusade for Christ and first published in 1965. "This Was Your Life" was the first of many tracts written and illustrated by Jack Chick, whose later "Chick tracts" followed the pattern of vivid cartoon images.

In the 1980s and 1990s, Last Days Ministries reprinted articles in its Last Days Newsletter by Keith Green and other contemporary and historic writers including David Wilkerson, Leonard Ravenhill, Winkie Pratney, Charles Finney, John Wesley, and William Booth. More recently, Living Waters Publications prints tracts such as "The Atheist Test" or "Are You Good Enough to Go to Heaven?", as well as tracts which feature attention-grabbing illusions or gags. These include the "Million Dollar Bill", which caused a legal controversy in June 2006. Most Christian tract ministries operate as non-profit "faith" organizations, to the degree some do not charge fees for their tracts. One of the most productive is Fellowship Tract League, which has printed over 4 billion Gospel tracts since 1978, available in over 70 languages and distributed in over 200 countries and territories.

Tracts are widely used in Methodist tradition, being published by apostolates such as the Old Paths Tract Society, Pilgrim Tract Society, and World Missionary Press.

Baptists use tracts, with notable publishers including Sword of the Lord Ministries and Chick Publications.

Since the 2010s, Saint Paul Street Evangelization, a Catholic apostolate focused on evangelism, has been publishing tracts for distribution especially while engaged in street ministry.

"Tracting" is a colloquialism commonly used by missionaries of The Church of Jesus Christ of Latter-day Saints, in reference to their door-to-door proselytising whether or not actual tracts are dispensed.

=== Political tracts ===
Brochure-like tracts, also known as pamphlets, advocating political positions have also been used throughout history as well. They were used throughout Europe in the 17th century, with those in 18th century featuring prominently in the political unrest leading to the American Revolution, and in an English response to the French Revolution, a "pamphlet war" known as the Revolution Controversy. A well-known example of a far-reaching tract from this era is Common Sense by Thomas Paine.

Tracts were used for political purposes throughout the 20th century. They were used to spread Nazi propaganda in Central Europe during the 1930s and 1940s. According to the aforementioned Jack Chick, his impetus to design cartoon-based religious tracts was inspired by similar literature used by Chinese Communists to wide success. In the months before the John F. Kennedy assassination, Lee Harvey Oswald handed out pamphlets promoting Fidel Castro and Communist Cuba on the streets of New Orleans, Louisiana.

== See also ==
- Chick tract
- Marprelate Controversy
- Minor tractate
- Miss Clack
- Nezikin
- Pamphlet
- Tractarian movement
- Tractate
- Tractatus
