= Carol J. Greenhouse =

American anthropologist (born 1950)

- Born: Carol Jane Greenhouse; January 4, 1950 (age 76)
- Spouse: Alfred C. Aman, Jr.

Academic background
- Education: Harvard University (BA); Harvard University (PhD)
- Doctoral advisors: Evon Z. Vogt; Klaus-Friedrich Koch

Academic work
- Discipline: Anthropology, Legal Anthropology
- Institutions: Indiana University Bloomington; Cornell University; Princeton University

Carol Jane Greenhouse (born January 4, 1950) is an American anthropologist known for her scholarship on law, time, democracy, and neoliberalism. She is currently professor emerita in the Department of Anthropology at Princeton University, where she previously served as Arthur W. Marks Professor of Anthropology and Department Chair. She is also the former president of the American Ethnological Society (2013-2015), former editor of its peer-review journal, American Ethnologist (1998-2002), and former president of both the Law and Society Association (1996-1997) and Association for Political and Legal Anthropology (1999-2001).

Greenhouse, whose scholarship is notable for its engagement with the thought of Émile Durkheim, has been haled as one of the leading legal anthropologists of her generation. Her books and articles have earned various honors, including the Law and Society Association's Harry Kalven Prize and the Association for the Study of Law, Culture, and Humanities' James Boyd White Award. She is a fellow of the American Academy of Arts and Sciences and member of the American Philosophical Society.

== Early life and education ==
Greenhouse was born on January 4, 1950, in New Haven, Connecticut, H. Robert and Dorothy E. Greenhouse.

In 1967, her first year at Radcliffe College, she enrolled in an anthropology of law seminar taught by legal anthropologist Klaus-Friedrich Koch, who would become her undergraduate and graduate adviser alongside Mesoamerican anthropologist Evon Z. Vogt. Her early academic interest was shaped by the rights-based social movements of the era and by questions about law, peace, and conflict she sought to understand through anthropology. As an undergraduate, she conducted fieldwork among Indigenous Maya in Zinacantan, in the highlands of Chiapas, Mexico, as a member of the Harvard Chiapas Project. She received her Bachelor of Arts in Anthropology from Radcliffe College in 1971.

Greenhouse remained at Harvard for her Ph.D. in Anthropology, which she received in 1976. Her earlier fieldwork on sacred and secular dispute resolution in Zinacantan led her to pursue similar questions in her doctoral research, which focused on a small Baptist community in the southern United States. Working with Koch and Vogt, she completed her dissertation and received here Ph.D. in 1976; her doctoral minor was in law.

== Career ==
=== Early career (1975–1977) ===
Following the completion of her doctorate, Greenhouse taught part-time at Georgia State University in 1975 and at George Mason University in 1977, and from 1976 to 1977 she worked as a research analyst at the Bureau of Social Science Research in Washington, D.C.

=== Cornell University (1977–1991) ===
In 1977, Greenhouse joined the faculty of Cornell University in her first tenure-track appointment.Her first book, Praying for Justice: Faith, Order, and Community in an American Town (1986), grew out of her dissertation research in a predominantly white, middle-class, suburban Southern Baptist community in Georgia. The book examines how religious beliefs shape ideas about justice, conflict, and social order, and was received as one of the inaugural works in contemporary American legal studies within anthropology—a field that had previously focused primarily on non-Western societies. Greenhouse was promoted to associate professor in 1983 and remained at Cornell until 1991.

=== Indiana University (1991–2001) ===
In 1991, Greenhouse moved to Indiana University Bloomington, where she held positions in both the Department of Anthropology and the (former) Department of Communication and Culture. Her co-authored book Law and Community in Three American Towns (with Barbara Yngvesson and David M. Engel, Cornell University Press, 1994) received the Law and Society Association Book Prize in 1996. During this period she was awarded a visiting Chair of American Civilization at the École des hautes études en sciences sociales (EHESS) in Paris for the academic year 1998–99, where she taught a seminar on American ethnography at the intersection of law and literature.

=== Princeton University (2001–2019) ===
In 2001, Greenhouse joined the Department of Anthropology at Princeton University. In 2012 she was named the Arthur W. Marks '19 Professor of Anthropology. She served as chair of the Department of Anthropology from 2007 to 2016. During her tenure at Princeton, Greenhouse served on the executive committee of the Program in Law and Public Affairs, the Faculty Advisory Committee on Appointments and Promotions, and the University Committee on Research in the Humanities and Social Sciences. She also led the development of Princeton's Program in Ethnographic Studies, which launched in 2015 and enabled undergraduates in all divisions to earn a certificate in ethnographic studies alongside their primary major. She retired in 2019 and holds the title of professor emerita.

== Personal life ==
Greenhouse is married to Alfred C. Aman Jr., former Dean of the Indiana University Maurer School of Law. She is a sister of Pulitzer Prize-winning journalist Linda Greenhouse.

== Books ==
- Praying for Justice: Faith, Order, and Community in an American Town. Cornell University Press, 1986.
- Law and Community in Three American Towns. Cornell University Press, 1994.
- A Moment's Notice: Time Politics Across Cultures. Cornell University Press, 1996.
- Democracy and Ethnography: Constructing Identities in Multicultural Liberal States (Editor). SUNY Press, 1998.
- Ethnography in Unstable Places: Everyday Lives in Contexts of Dramatic Political Change (Editor). Duke University Press, 2002.
- Ethnographies of Neoliberalism (Editor). University of Pennsylvania Press, 2009.
- The Paradox of Relevance: Ethnography and Citizenship in the United States. University of Pennsylvania Press, 2011.
