= David Watson (evangelist) =

English Anglican priest (1933–1984)

The Reverend Canon David Watson
- Rector of St Michael le Belfrey
- Church: Church of England
- Diocese: Diocese of York
- In office: 1973 to 1982
- Other post: Curate-in-Charge of St Cuthbert's Church, York (1965–1973)

Orders
- Ordination: 1959 (deacon); 1960 (priest)

Personal details
- Born: 7 March 1933
- Died: 18 February 1984 (aged 50)
- Denomination: Anglicanism
- Education: Bedford School; Wellington College, Berkshire
- Alma mater: St John's College, Cambridge; Ridley Hall, Cambridge

David Christopher Knight Watson (7 March 1933 – 18 February 1984) was an English Anglican priest, evangelist and author.

== Early life and education ==
David Watson was born on 7 March 1933 at Catterick Camp, Scotton, Yorkshire to Godfrey Charles Knight Watson, a captain in the Royal Artillery, and his wife Margaret Sara Winifred. He was educated at Bedford School (1940-1946) and Wellington College (1946-1951). He was head boy of Wellington College.

Watson studied the Moral Sciences Tripos (i.e. philosophy) at St John's College, Cambridge, graduating with a Bachelor of Arts (BA) degree in 1957. While at Cambridge, he converted to Christianity and attended the Cambridge Inter-Collegiate Christian Union. He became involved with the Iwerne camps ministry of the Revd E. J. H. Nash by the invitation of David Sheppard, later to become Bishop of Liverpool. Watson noted: "Undoubtedly the most formative influence on my faith during the five years at Cambridge was my involvement with the boys' houseparties, or 'Bash camps.' It was the best possible training I could receive.": 'Bash' was a nickname of Revd E. J. H. Nash. From 1957 to 1959, he studied theology and trained for ordination at Ridley Hall, Cambridge, an evangelical Anglican theological college.

== Ordained ministry ==
Watson was ordained in the Church of England as a deacon in 1959 and as a priest in 1960. He started his ordained ministry among dock workers in the parish of St Marks, Gillingham, Kent.

Watson's second curacy took him to the Round Church in Cambridge where the vicar was Mark Ruston. Around the same time, encouraged by Martyn Lloyd Jones, Watson sought the religious experience known as baptism in the Holy Spirit and began to speak in tongues.

Watson became curate-in-charge of St Cuthbert's Church, York in 1965, which was attended by no more than twelve at any service and was twelve months away from redundancy. Eight years later the congregation had out-grown St Cuthbert's and an array of annexes resulting in a move to St Michael le Belfrey, York. Subsequently, the congregation grew to many hundreds in only a few years. As his ministry progressed, Watson was involved with missionary enterprises throughout the world and was a high-profile advocate of reconciliation and ecumenism in Northern Ireland. He met the Vineyard Leader John Wimber in 1980, and was one of the first people to welcome him to the UK. This encouraged the connection between Wimber and Terry Virgo of Newfrontiers that ensued. He left St Michael le Belfrey in 1982 for London.

Watson was a regular contributor to Renewal magazine, a publication of the interdenominational charismatic movement which started in the 1960s.

Watson was diagnosed with cancer in April 1983, and believed he was being healed through prayer. He died of cancer on 18 February 1984 after recording his fight with the disease in a book, Fear No Evil. John Gunstone remarked of Watson that "It is doubtful whether any other English Christian leader has had greater influence on this side of the Atlantic since the Second World War." J. I. Packer called him "one of the best-known clergymen in England".

== Views ==
David Watson originally questioned aspects of Catholicism. However, he was later involved in ecumenical promotion of charismatic renewal via the Fountain Trust, and marched alongside Catholic leaders in peace marches in Northern Ireland during The Troubles. He championed charismatic evangelicalism within the Church of England, and, unlike some other evangelicals of the time, was convinced of remaining in mainstream denominations.

== Works ==
=== Bibliography ===
- Christian Myth and Spiritual Reality (1967)
- My God Is Real (1971)
- God's Freedom Fighters (US How to Win the War) (1972)
- One in the Spirit (1973)
- I Believe in Evangelism (1976)
- In Search of God (1974)
- Live a New Life (1978)
- I Believe in the Church (1978)
- Is Anyone There? (1979)
- Discipleship (in US Called and Committed) (1981)
- Jesus, Then and Now (1983)
- You Are My God : An Autobiography (1983)
- Fear No Evil - A Personal Struggle with Cancer (1984)
- Hidden Warfare (1987)

=== Video works ===
- Jesus Then and Now - V. 1 - Beginnings and Temptation (1983)
- Jesus Then and Now - V. 2 - Disciples and Miracles (1983)
- Jesus Then and Now - V. 3 - Lifestyle and Prayer (1983)
- Jesus Then and Now - V. 4 - The Man and Opposition (1983)
- Jesus Then and Now - V. 5 - Crucifixion and Resurrection (1983)
- Jesus Then and Now - V. 6 - The Spirit and the New Age (1983)

== Biographical ==
- Teddy Saunders and Hugh Sansom David Watson, A Biography (Sevenoaks: Hodder, 1992)
- Edward England (Ed) A Portrait by his Friends (Godalming: Highland, 1985)
- Porter, Matthew. David Watson: Evangelism, Renewal, Reconciliation (Cambridge: Grove Books, 2003)
