= James Petersen =

James Petersen may refer to:

- Jim Petersen (born 1962), American basketball player and coach
- Pete Petersen (politician) (James F. Petersen, born 1950), American politician
- James Petersen (anthropologist) (1954–2005), American anthropologist and archaeologist
