= Huntington's Disease Outreach Project for Education at Stanford =

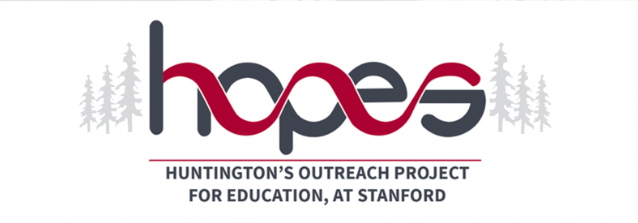
HOPES Logo

The Huntington's disease Outreach Project for Education at Stanford (HOPES) is a student-run project at Stanford University dedicated to making scientific information about Huntington's disease (HD) more readily accessible to patients and the public. It was initiated by Professor William H. Durham in 2000. The HOPES team surveys the rapidly growing scientific and clinical literature on Huntington's disease. They then present this information in a web resource that reflects the current scientific understanding of HD.

The HOPES website provides information about topics including the causes and symptoms of HD, existing drugs and supplements that may help HD patients, recent advances in HD research and lifestyle choices for managing HD. Articles summarize and synthesize recent research on HD for a non-technical audience. The website is designed for people of all ages and scientific backgrounds. Material ranges from interactive articles about basic genetics, written for children, to more comprehensive topics in molecular neuroscience, such as the potential for stem cells to treat or cure HD.

== Awards ==
In June 2008 HOPES was honored with the first annual “Giving a Voice to HD” award from the Huntington's Disease Society of America (HDSA), which recognizes an individual or group who has helped to raise awareness about HD in the community.

In October 2018, HOPES was honored with the Community Advocate Award at the 12th Annual San Francisco Team Hope Walk
