= Linda Greenhouse =

American legal journalist (born 1947)

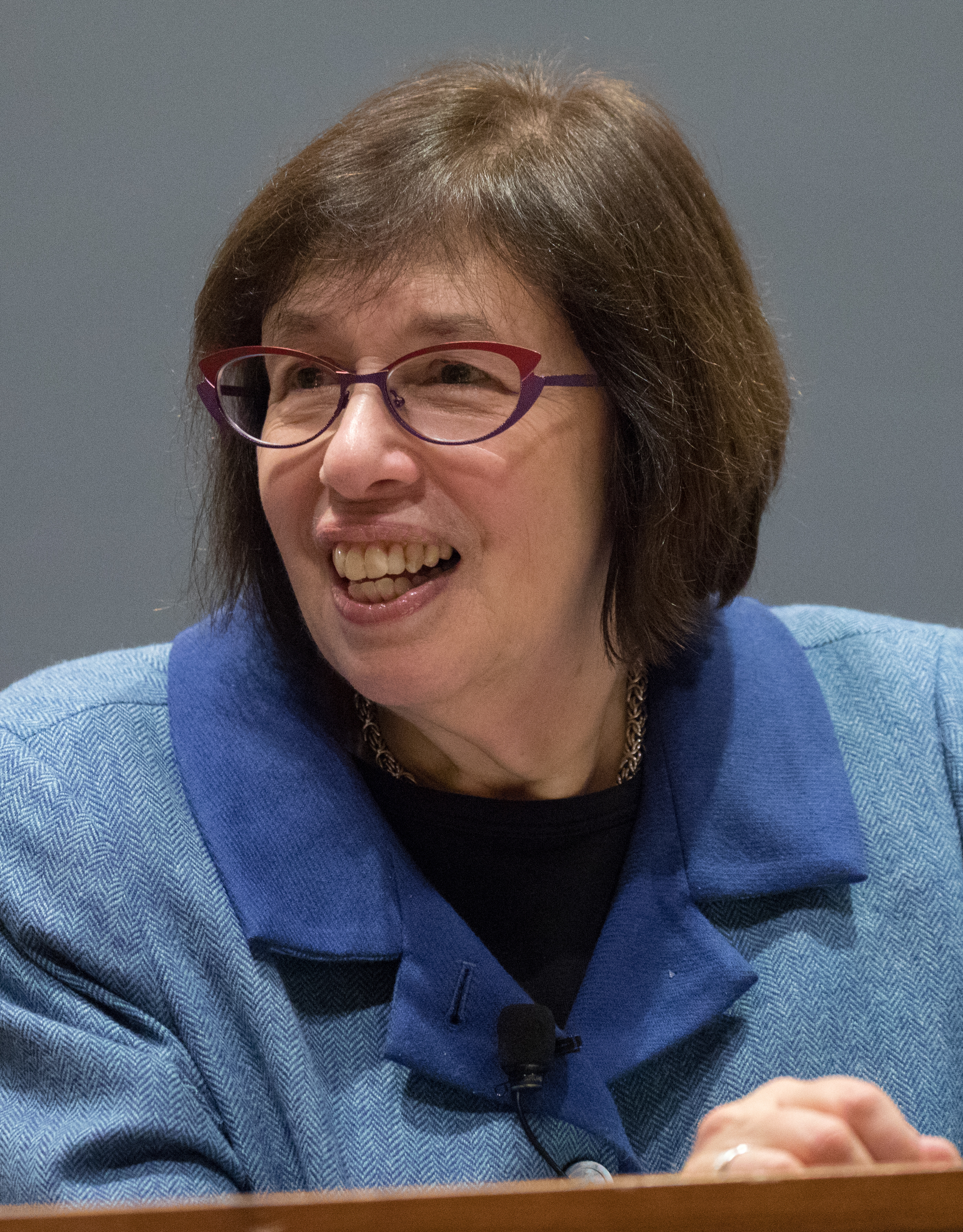
- Greenhouse in 2019
- Born: Linda Joyce Greenhouse; January 9, 1947 (age 79); New York City, U.S.
- Education: Radcliffe College (BA); Yale University (MSL)
- Occupation: Journalist
- Spouse: Eugene R. Fidell (m. 1981)
- Children: Hannah Fidell
- Awards: Pulitzer Prize (1998); Henry J. Friendly Medal (2002)

Linda Joyce Greenhouse (born January 9, 1947) is an American legal journalist who is the Knight Distinguished Journalist in Residence and Joseph M. Goldstein Lecturer in Law at Yale Law School. She is a Pulitzer Prize-winning reporter who covered the United States Supreme Court for nearly three decades for The New York Times. Between 2017 and 2023, she served as president of the American Philosophical Society, and is also a member of the Phi Beta Kappa Senate.

== Early life and education ==
Greenhouse was born in a Jewish family in New York City, to H. Robert Greenhouse, a physician and professor of psychiatry at Harvard Medical School, and Dorothy (née Greenlick). She received her Bachelor of Arts degree in government from Radcliffe College in 1968, where she was elected to Phi Beta Kappa. She received her Master of Studies in Law from Yale Law School in 1978, during which time she was a student of Robert Bork.

== Career ==
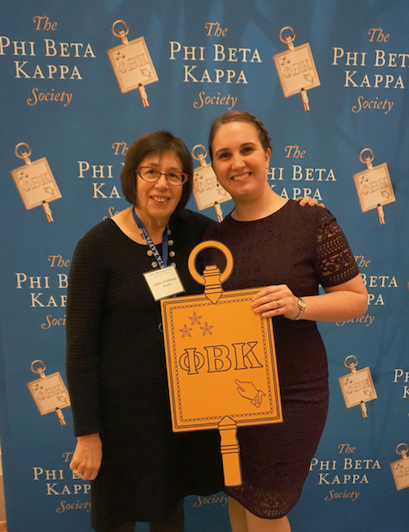
Linda Greenhouse (left) at the Phi Beta Kappa Book Awards Dinner in Washington, D.C., on December 7, 2018.

Greenhouse began her 40-year career at The New York Times covering state government in the paper's bureau in Albany. After completing her master's degree on a Ford Foundation fellowship, she returned to the Times and covered every session of the Supreme Court from 1978 to 2007, with the exception of two years in the mid-1980s when she was a Congressional reporter. Since 1981, she has published over 2,800 articles in the Times. She has been a regular guest on the PBS program Washington Week.

At the conclusion of the Supreme Court session in the summer of 2008, Greenhouse accepted a Times offer for early retirement. Seven of the nine sitting Justices attended a goodbye party for her on June 12, 2008. After retiring, she continued to blog for the Times in their "Opinionator" section, and wrote occasional guest columns.

In 2010, Greenhouse and Reva Siegel co-authored a book on the history of the U.S. abortion debate prior to the 1973 Roe v. Wade decision. Titled Before Roe v. Wade, the book is largely a selection of primary documents, with commentary provided by the two authors.

From 2010 to 2021, Greenhouse wrote a bi-weekly opinion column for The New York Times, centered on the Supreme Court and the law. Since 2016, she has been a regular contributor to The New York Review of Books.

In a 2006 speech at Harvard's Radcliffe Institute for Advanced Study, Greenhouse criticized US policies and actions at Guantanamo Bay, Abu Ghraib, and Haditha. In the speech, she recalled her struggles as a young woman with gender discrimination: "I was the Harvard stringer for the Boston Herald, which regularly printed, and paid me for, my accounts of student unrest and other newsworthy events at Harvard. But when it came time during my senior year to look for a job in journalism, the Herald would not even give me an interview, and neither would the Boston Globe, because these newspapers had no interest in hiring women." She also told an anecdote about attending a Simon & Garfunkel reunion concert in 2003. She said that midway through the concert she surprised herself by suddenly breaking into tears as she realized her generation had not done a better job than previous generations of running the country.

=== Awards and prizes ===
Greenhouse was awarded the Pulitzer Prize in Journalism (Beat Reporting) in 1998 "for her consistently illuminating coverage of the United States Supreme Court." In 2004, she received the Goldsmith Career Award for Excellence in Journalism and the John Chancellor Award for Excellence in Journalism. She was a Radcliffe Institute Medal winner in 2006.

== Accusations of bias ==
Greenhouse has often publicly expressed her views in support of abortion rights, and in opposition to conservative religious values. A 2006 report on NPR questioned whether Greenhouse's outspokenness on such matters compromised the appearance of journalistic neutrality which she has maintained. In response, New York Times editor Daniel Okrent said he had never received a single complaint of bias in Greenhouse's many years of covering the Supreme Court.

Ed Whelan, writing in a blog associated with the National Review, suggested that Greenhouse was obligated to inform her readers when she reported on a Supreme Court case for which her husband, Eugene Fidell, had submitted an amicus brief, such as in the Hamdan case and the Boumediene case. Clark Hoyt of The New York Times opined that the paper "should have clued in readers" to Greenhouse's conflict, but defended the neutrality of her reporting. In a Slate article, Emily Bazelon and Dahlia Lithwick faulted The New York Times for failing "to stand up" for Greenhouse and defend her from Whelan's criticism. They quoted Yale Law School professor Judith Resnik who pointed out that Whelan was unable to cite any actual examples of bias.

== Personal life ==
Greenhouse married lawyer Eugene R. Fidell on January 1, 1981, in Washington, D.C., in a Jewish ceremony. Together they have one daughter, filmmaker Hannah Fidell (born October 7, 1985). Greenhouse is the sister of prominent legal anthropologist Carol J. Greenhouse and sister-in-law of Alfred C. Aman Jr., former dean of Indiana University Maurer School of Law.

== Bibliography ==
=== Books ===
- Greenhouse, Linda (2005). Becoming Justice Blackmun: Harry Blackmun's Supreme Court Journey. New York: Times Books. ISBN 978-0805077919.
- — (2010). Before Roe v. Wade: Voices that Shaped the Abortion Debate Before the Supreme Court's Ruling. New York: Kaplan Publishing. ISBN 978-1607146711. Co-authored with Reva Siegel.
- — (2016). The Burger Court and the Rise of the Judicial Right. Simon & Schuster. ISBN 978-1476732503. Co-authored with Michael J. Graetz.
- — (2017). Just a Journalist: On the Press, Life, and the Spaces Between. Harvard University Press. ISBN 978-0674980334.
- — (2021). Justice on the Brink: The Death of Ruth Bader Ginsburg, the Rise of Amy Coney Barrett, and Twelve Months That Transformed the Supreme Court. Random House. ISBN 978-0593447932.
- — (2023). The U.S. Supreme Court: A Very Short Introduction. Oxford University Press. ISBN 978-0197689462.

=== Selected articles ===
- Greenhouse, Linda (March 2004). "'Because We Are Final': Judicial Review Two Hundred Years After Marbury" (PDF). Proceedings of the American Philosophical Society. 148 (1): 38. Archived from the original (PDF) on October 18, 2011.
- — (April 10, 2005). "The Evolution of a Justice". The New York Times.
- — (2006). "A Bridge Over Troubled Water". 2006 Radcliffe Institute Medalist. Radcliffe Institute for Advanced Study, Harvard University. Archived from the original on August 26, 2007.
- — (May 26, 2016). "The Bittersweet Victories of Women". The New York Review of Books.
- — (October 12, 2017). "Who Killed the ERA?". The New York Review of Books.
- — (November 7, 2019). "The First and Last of Her Kind". The New York Review of Books.
- — (May 29, 2025). "How Brown Came North and Failed". The New York Review of Books.
