= Fountain Trust =

The Fountain Trust was an ecumenical agency formed in the UK in 1964 to promote the charismatic renewal. The trust operated on the principle that it was the purpose of the Holy Spirit to "renew the historic churches". D. Eryl Davies, principal of the Evangelical Theological College of Wales, has criticized the trust for "facilitating interdenominational fellowship and bonding more on the basis of the charismata and a distinctive 'spirituality' rather than on the unique truths of the biblical gospel" and because "a theological looseness as well as ambiguity developed with regard to the gospel itself." However, no such "theological looseness" was ever apparent to those who had the joy and privilege of working at the Fountain Trust, nor to the many thousands whose lives were touched by God through its ministry.

It was founded by Michael Harper, a Church of England priest who experienced what charismatics and Pentecostals termed the Baptism of the Holy Spirit, a religious experience accompanied by speaking in tongues. Between July 1964 and its voluntary dissolution in 1980, Fountain Trust sponsored several conferences, meetings and publications, involving leaders such as Bible teacher Arthur Wallis and theologian Thomas Smail, who became director in 1975. The first of five biennial international conferences under the auspices of the trust was held at Guildford, England in 1971.

In 1966 the Trust set up Renewal magazine, which for several decades was the leading magazine for charismatic Christians in the UK. In recent years it has merged with Christianity magazine. The Trust also published a supplement entitled Theological Renewal three times a year.

The archives of the Trust are now with the Donald Gee Center for Pentecostal & Charismatic Research at Mattersey Hall.

== Other sources ==
- P.D. Hocken, "Fountain Trust" in Stanley M. Burgess & Eduard van der Maas, The New International Dictionary of Pentecostal and Charismatic Movements, revised edition, (Zondervan, 2002)
- Hastings, Adrian (2001). A History of English Christianity, 1920-2000. SCM Press. ISBN 978-0-334-02824-6.
