= Colin Urquhart =

English evangelical minister (1940–2021)

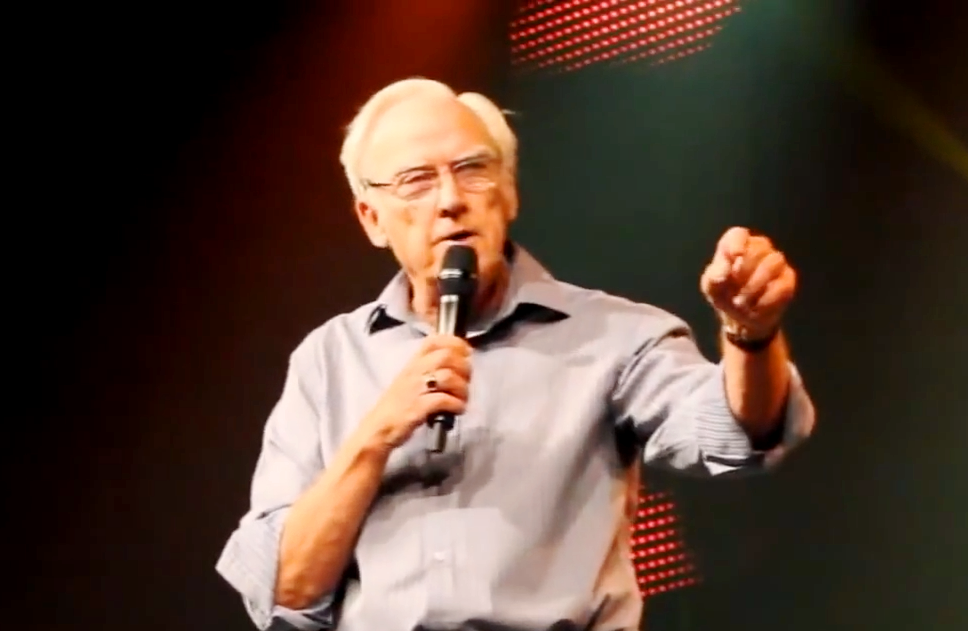
- Church: Kingdom Faith Church

Orders
- Ordination: 1963 by Church of England

Personal details
- Born: 1940 Twickenham, London, England, U.K.
- Died: 13 September 2021 (aged 80–81)
- Education: Kings College

Colin Urquhart (1940 – 13 September 2021) was an English Evangelical Christian minister, speaker, author, and apostolic and Neocharismatic leader in the United Kingdom.

== Early life ==
Urquhart was born in Twickenham, London, England. His father was an architect who designed and built camps for the Ministry of Defense. As a boy, Urquhart experienced bombing from World War II in his neighborhood.

He described his family as "non-Christian". However, he enjoyed singing so he joined the choir of the Anglican Church in Twickenham when he was ten years old. At his request, his parents gave him a book of prayers for his birthday.

Urquhart played cricket for his school and a local club. Middlesex offered him a trial, but he decided not to go. When he was thirteen years old, he asked the vicar how he could become ordained, but the minimum age was sixteen. After school, he followed his family's plan and studied with an architectural firm for a year.

Urquhart still wanted to become a minister with the Church of England. He recalled, " I had to sit my A' levels before I could go to King's College. I was ordained in 1963 when I was 23."

== Career ==
He started as a curate for a church in Cheshunt for three years. Next, he was sent to Letchworth in Hertfordshire where he was in charge of a district church. He became involved with the Charismatic Renewal movement in the 1960s and 1970s. He was the incumbent (vicar) of the parish church of St Hugh, Lewsey Luton, Bedfordshire, at the time, and during four years immense changes took place there.

In 1974 he wrote a book about these experiences, called When the Spirit Comes, one of several books he authored during the 1970s. At the start of 1976, he resigned as the incumbent of St Hugh's and moved with his family and two parishioners to a house in East Molesey, Surrey that was owned by Fountain Trust, an international trust involved in Christian renewal. From this base he began an itinerant ministry traveling nationally and internationally, with his living costs arising solely from donations (which some Christians like to refer to as 'living by faith').

Urquhart called this church called the Community of Love and Prayers which he later said: "was nothing like a hippy commune." The BBC made a documentary about the Community of Love and Prayers. In the later 1970s, Urquhart founded the Kingdom Faith Church in Horsham in West Sussex. The church expanded over the years to seven locations and the Kingdom Faith Training College.

By the early 1980s Urquhart was becoming more widely known internationally as a writer, and as a speaker at Charismatic conferences, rallies, and conventions. In the eighties he spoke at some of the Full Gospel Business Men's Fellowship International Conventions in Mumbai, India, based on the theme, "Go in my name" and "If my people" in India. Urquhart recorded more than 500 Faith For Today radio messages.

As of 2014, Urquhart turned over the Kingdom Faith Church to his son, Clive Urquhart. However, Urquhart still spoke at conferences and was the principal of the Kingdom Faith Training College.

== Personal life ==
Urquhart's wife was Caroline. Their children were Claire, Clive, and Andrea. He died from cancer in 2021 at the age of 81 years.

== Publications ==
- When the Spirit Comes (Hodder & Stoughton, 1974) ISBN 9780340192382
- Anything You Ask (Hodder & Stoughton, 1980) ISBN 9780340233481
- In Christ Jesus (Trafalgar Square Publishing, 1981) ISBN 9780340276013
- Faith for the Future (Trafalgar Square Publishing, 1982) ISBN 9780340322628
- My Father is the Gardener (Hodder & Stoughton, 1982) ISBN 9780340213278
- Holy Fire (Trafalgar Square Publishing, 1984) ISBN 9780340342800
- The Positive Kingdom (Hodder & Stoughton, 1985) ISBN 9780340364789
- Listen and Live (Trafalgar Square Publishing, 1987) ISBN 9780340417799
- Receive Your Healing (Crossroad Publishing, 1987) ISBN 9780824508074
- Personal Victory (Hodder & Stoughton Religious Division, 1988) ISBN 9780340485019
- My Dear Child: Listening to God's Heart (Hodder & Stoughton, 1990) ISBN 9780340536421
- My Dear Son (Hodder Christian Books, 1992) ISBN 9780340558096
- The Truth That Sets You Free (Hodder & Stoughton Religious, 1993) ISBN 9780340590584
- The Handbook on Healing (Thomas Nelson Publishers, 1994) ISBN 9780785283423
- Your Personal Bible (Hodder & Stoughton Religious, 1994) ISBN 9780340612439
- From Mercy to Majesty: Moving into Revival (Hodder and Stoughton, 1995) ISBN 9780340642085
- Encountering the Presence (Destiny Image Incorporated, 1998) ISBN 9780768420180
- Friends of Jesus (Zondervan, 1997) ISBN 9780551031159
- God's Plan for Your Healing: Knowing His Purpose and Explaining His Power (Zondervan, 1998) ISBN 9780551031685
- Revival Fire (Zondervan, 1999) ISBN 9780551032170
- My dear beloved (Zondervan, 2000) ISBN 9780551032637
- Faith: The Explaining Series (Sovereign World Ltd, 2000) ISBN 9781852400859
- True Life (Kingdom Faith, 2001) ISBN 9781900409285
- True Love (Kingdom Faith, 2001) ISBN 9781900409278
- True Face (Kingdom Faith, 2002) ISBN 9781900409315
- Explaining Deception (Sovereign World, 2003) ISBN 9781852403447
- True Church (Kingdom Faith, 2002) ISBN 978-1900409377
- True Covenant (Kingdom Faith, 2002) ISBN 9781900409384
- True Disciples (Kingdom Faith, 2002) ISBN 978-1900409322
- True Grace (Kingdom Faith, 2002) ASIN B0063HQUAI
- True Activity (Kingdom Faith, 2003) ASIN B00684EI64
- True Healing (Kingdom Faith, 2003) ISBN 9781900409469
- True Prayer (Kingdom Faith, 2003) ISBN 1900409453
- True Salvation (Kingdom Faith, 2003) ASIN B005WJWCU0
- True Worship (Kingdom Faith, 2003) ISBN 978-1900409414
- True Kingdom (Kingdom Faith, 2004) ASIN B00FDURQ4A
- True Leadership (Kingdom Faith, 2004) ASIN B008X726CM
- True Peace & Joy (Kingdom Faith, 2004) ISBN 9781900409544
- True Promises (Kingdom Faith, 2004) ASIN B008VTBBO6
- True Revival (Kingdom Faith, 2004) ISBN 978-1900409605
- True Sons (Kingdom Faith, 2004) ASIN B00GFSWMZW
- True Spirit (Kingdom Faith, 2004) ISBN 9781900409445
- The Great Revelation (Integrity Media Europe, 2009) ISBN 9781907080005
- The Truth: New Testament (Integrity Media Europe, 2010) ISBN 9781907080111
- True God (Kingdom Faith, 2012) ASIN B008Y2RE00
- The Truth for Today: As Revealed in the Epistles of the New Testament (Kingdom Faith, 2012) ASIN B008CFSENU
- The Truth for Today: 1 Corinthians (Kingdom Faith, 2012) ASIN B007VDMNRM
- The Truth for Today: 2 Corinthians (Kingdom Faith, 2012) ASIN B007VDMPUM
- The Truth for Today: Ephesians, Colossians & Philippians (Kingdom Faith, 2012) ASIN B007VBZYH0
- The Truth for Today: Epistles of Paul (Kingdom Faith, 2012) ASIN B007UPOO6E
- The Truth for Today: Galatians, 1 Thessalonians & 2 Thessalonians (Kingdom Faith, 2012) ASIN B007VCSECG
- The Truth for Today: The General Epistles (Kingdom Faith, 2012) ASIN B008B8TUP4
- The Truth for Today: Hebrews (Kingdom Faith, 2012) ASIN B008B8PUV2
- The Truth for Today: James, 1 Peter & 2 Peter (Kingdom Faith, 2012) ASIN B008B8TX42
- The Truth for Today: Jude, 1 John, 2 John & 3 John (Kingdom Faith, 2012) ASIN B008B69MPE
- The Truth for Today: Romans (Kingdom Faith, 2012) ASIN B007VDJBMC
- The Truth for Today: 1 Timothy, 2 Timothy, Titus & Philemon (Kingdom Faith, 2012) ASIN B007VCSFR0
- The Truth New Testament Study Edition (New Wine Press, 2013) ISBN 9781905991914
- The Lord's Orchard: God's Charter for Reformation (New Wine Press, 2015) ISBN 9781910848104
- The Truth for Today as Revealed in the Letters of the New Testament (New Wine Press, 2015) ISBN 9781910848074
- Truth That Sets You Free (New Wine Press, 2015) ISBN 9781910848081
- The Blood Speaks (Kingdom Faith, 2019) ASIN B081B812Y5
- How to know Jesus (Kingdom Faith, 2019) ASIN B07YPRXPM5
- Your Journey to Heaven (Kingdom Faith, 2019) ASIN B07Z96PJVT
- Anything You Ask: Learn How to Pray with Faith and See God Answer Your Prayers (Kingdom Faith, 2020) ASIN B083G16DB3
