= Bernard Siegel =

Bernard or Bernie Siegel may refer to:

- Bernard Siegel (actor) (1868–1940), Eastern European-born American actor
- Bernard J. Siegel (1917–2003), American anthropologist
- Bernie S. Siegel (born 1932), American writer and pediatric surgeon
- Bernard Siegel (attorney) (born 1949), American litigator

== See also ==
- Bernard G. Segal (1907–1997), American corporate lawyer
- Harold Bernard Segel (born 1930), American academic
- Bernard Seigal (1957–2006), American musician/singer also known as "Buddy Blue"
- Siegel (surname)
