= Charismatic movement =

Religious trend

The charismatic movement in Christianity is a movement within established or mainstream denominations to adopt beliefs and practices of Charismatic Christianity, with an emphasis on baptism with the Holy Spirit, and the use of spiritual gifts (charismata). It has affected most denominations in the United States, and has spread widely across the world.

The movement is deemed to have begun in 1960 in Anglicanism (through the Episcopal Church USA) and spread to other mainstream Protestant denominations, including other American Protestants by both Lutherans and Presbyterians by 1962, and to Catholicism by 1967. Methodists became involved in the charismatic movement in the 1970s.

The movement was not initially influential in evangelical churches. Although this changed in the 1980s in the so-called Third Wave, the movement was often expressed in the formation of separate evangelical churches such as Calvary Chapel and the Vineyard Movement—neo-charismatic organisations that mirrored the establishment of Pentecostal churches. Many traditional evangelical churches remain opposed to the movement and teach a cessationist theology.

== History ==
The classic Pentecostalism movement usually traces its origin to the early twentieth century, with the ministry of Charles F. Parham and the subsequent ministry of William Joseph Seymour and the Azusa Street Revival. Its unique doctrine involved a dramatic encounter with God, termed baptism with the Holy Spirit. Some believed that speaking in tongues was evidence for having had this experience.

Before 1955, the Christian mainstream did not embrace Pentecostal doctrines. If a church member or clergyman openly expressed such views, they would (either voluntarily or involuntarily) separate from their existing denomination. However, by the 1960s, many of the characteristic teachings were gaining acceptance among Christians within mainline Protestant denominations.

The movement represented a reversal of the previous pattern, as those influenced by Pentecostal spirituality chose to remain in their original denominations. The popularization and broader acceptance of charismatic teachings and ideas are linked to the Healing Revival that occurred from 1946 to 1958. The revivalists of the time, including William Branham, Oral Roberts, and A. A. Allen, held large interdenominational meetings which emphasized the gifts of the spirit. This global revival led to greater awareness and acceptance of Pentecostal teachings and practices.

The high church wing of the American Episcopal Church became the first traditional ecclesiastical organization to be affected internally by the new movement. The beginning of this charismatic movement is usually dated to Sunday, April 3, 1960, when Dennis J. Bennett, rector of St Mark's Episcopal Church in Van Nuys, California recounted his Pentecostal experience to his parish; he repeated it on the next two Sundays, including Easter (April 17), during which many of his congregation also shared the experience of spirit. He was forced to resign.

The resulting controversy and press coverage spread an awareness of the emerging charismatic movement. The movement grew to embrace other mainline churches, where clergy began receiving and publicly announcing their Pentecostal experiences. These clergy began holding meetings for seekers and healing services, which included praying over and anointing of the sick. The movement reached Lutherans and Presbyterians in 1962.

The Catholic Charismatic Renewal began in 1967 at Duquesne University in Pittsburgh, Pennsylvania. Methodists became involved in the 1970s.

The movement led to the founding of many covenant communities, such as Sword of the Spirit and Word of God. They are a force of ecumenism in that they have members from many major Christian denominations, such as Catholics, Lutherans, Anglicans, Reformed, and Methodists, who live and pray together.

Even though Pentecostals tend to share more in common with evangelicals than with either Catholics or non-evangelical wings of the church, the charismatic movement was not initially influential among evangelical churches. C. Peter Wagner traces the spread of the charismatic movement within evangelicalism to around 1985. He termed this movement the Third Wave of the Holy Spirit. The Third Wave has expressed itself through the formation of churches and denomination-like organizations. These groups are referred to as "neo-charismatic" and are distinct from the charismatic movement of the historic Christian churches. The Vineyard Movement and the British New Church Movement exemplify Third Wave or neo-charismatic organizations.

== Beliefs ==
Charismatic Christians believe in an experience of baptism with the Holy Spirit and that spiritual gifts (Greek charismata χαρίσματα, from charis χάρις, 'grace') of the Holy Spirit as described in the New Testament are available to contemporary Christians through the infilling or baptism of the Holy Spirit, with or without the laying on of hands.

The Charismatic movement holds that Baptism in the Holy Spirit is the "sovereign action of God, which usually occurs when someone with a disposition of surrender and docility, prays for a fresh outpouring of the Holy Spirit in his or her life". Additionally, "baptism in the Holy Spirit unleashes the Holy Spirit that is already present within us, by revitalizing the graces we received in the sacrament of Baptism." Baptism with the Holy Spirit "equips and inspires the individual for service, for mission, for discipleship and for life." Rev. Brenton Cordeiro teaches that those who have received Baptism with the Holy Spirit "testify that the experience brought them to a new awareness of the reality and presence of Jesus Christ in their lives [as well as] a new hunger for the Word of God, the Sacraments and were filled with a renewed desire for holiness."

Although the Bible lists many gifts from God through his Holy Spirit, there are nine specific gifts listed in 1 Corinthians 12:8–10 that are supernatural in nature and are the focus of and distinguishing feature of the movement: word of wisdom, word of knowledge, faith, gifts of healing, miraculous powers, prophecy, distinguishing between spirits, speaking in different tongues (languages), and interpretation of tongues.

While Pentecostals and Charismatics share these beliefs, there are differences. Many in the movement deliberately distanced themselves from Pentecostalism for cultural and theological reasons. Foremost among theological reasons is the tendency of many Pentecostals to insist that speaking in tongues is always the initial physical sign of receiving Spirit baptism. Although specific teachings will vary by denomination, Charismatics generally believe that the Holy Spirit has already been present in a person from the time of regeneration and prefer to call subsequent encounters with the Holy Spirit by other names, such as "being filled". In contrast to Pentecostals, Charismatics tend to accept a range of supernatural experiences (such as prophecy, miracles, healing, or "physical manifestations of an altered state of consciousness") as evidence of having been baptized or filled with the Holy Spirit.

Pentecostals are also distinguished from the charismatic movement on the basis of style. Also, Pentecostals have traditionally placed a high value on evangelization and missionary work. Charismatics, on the other hand, have tended to see their movement as a force for revitalization and renewal within their own church traditions.

Cessationists argue these sign and revelatory gifts were manifested in the New Testament for a specific purpose, upon which once accomplished, these signs were withdrawn and no longer function. Cessationists support this claim by suggesting there was a rapid decline in reports of such gifts from the time of the Church Fathers onwards. Non-cessationists argue that testimonial claims of God doing signs, wonders and miracles can especially be found in the first three centuries of the church. Sacramental charismatics also point out that the means of distribution of charismatic gifts in the early church, was not limited to the laying on of hands of the canonical apostles, but was tethered to the receptivity of prayer connected to the sacrament of baptism. The Charismatic movement is based on a belief that these gifts are still available today.

== Denominational expressions ==
=== Anglicanism ===
In the United States, Episcopalian priest Dennis Bennett is sometimes cited as one of the movement's seminal influences. Bennett was the rector at St Mark's Episcopal Church in Van Nuys, California, when he announced to the congregation in 1960 that he had received the outpouring of the Holy Spirit. Soon after this he ministered in Seattle, where he ran many workshops and seminars about the work of the Holy Spirit.

In the United Kingdom, Colin Urquhart, Michael Harper, David Watson, Trevor Dearing and others were in the vanguard of similar developments.

The Massey University conference in New Zealand in 1964 was attended by several Anglicans, including the Rev. Ray Muller. He invited Bennett to New Zealand in 1966, and played a leading role in developing and promoting the Life in the Spirit seminars. Other Charismatic movement leaders in New Zealand include Bill Subritzky.

As of the early 21st century, a "charismatic evangelical" wing or school of thought is commonly identified in the Church of England, contrasted with the conservative evangelical, Anglo-Catholic and other tendencies. An influential local church in this movement has been London's Holy Trinity Brompton, who have developed the Alpha course and planted 184 similarly charismatic churches. Justin Welby, the former Archbishop of Canterbury (2013—2025), has a background in charismatic evangelicalism.

=== Lutheranism ===
Larry Christenson, a Lutheran theologian based in San Pedro, California, did much in the 1960s and 1970s to interpret the movement for Lutherans. A very large annual conference was held in Minneapolis during those years. Some Lutheran Charismatics in the U.S. formed the Alliance of Renewal Churches.

Richard A. Jensen's Touched by the Spirit (1974) played a major role in the Lutheran understanding to the Charismatic movement. Other Lutheran Charismatic leaders have been Harald Bredesen and Morris Vaagenes. In Finland the emergence of charismatic congregations has reversed, in some places, a decline in attendance among Lutheran congregations.

=== Reformed ===
In Congregational and Presbyterian churches which profess a traditionally Calvinist or Reformed theology, there are differing views regarding present-day continuation or cessation of the gifts (charismata) of the Spirit. Generally, however, Reformed Charismatics distance themselves from renewal movements with tendencies that could be perceived as overemotional, such as Word of Faith, Toronto Blessing, Brownsville Revival and Lakeland Revival.

Prominent Reformed charismatic denominations are the Sovereign Grace Churches and the Every Nation Churches in the United States. In Great Britain the Newfrontiers churches and movement, founded by Terry Virgo, are among Reformed charismatic churches.

=== Catholicism ===
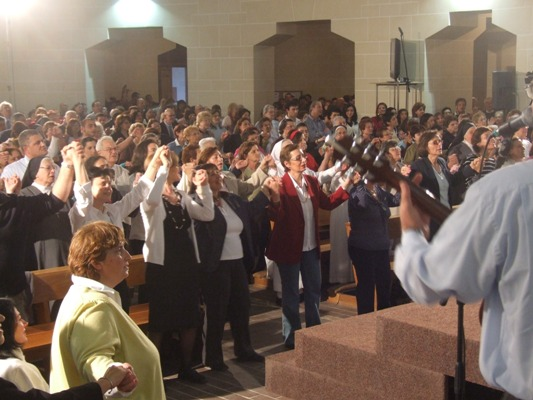
Praise and Worship during a Catholic charismatic renewal Healing Service.

In the United States the Catholic Charismatic Renewal was led by individuals such as Kevin Ranaghan and others at the University of Notre Dame in Notre Dame, Indiana. Duquesne University in Pittsburgh, which was founded by the Congregation of the Holy Spirit, a Catholic religious community, began hosting charismatic revivals in 1977.

In a foreword to a 1983 book by Léon Joseph Cardinal Suenens, at that time the Pope's delegate to the Catholic Charismatic Renewal, the then Prefect of the Congregation for the Doctrine of the Faith, Cardinal Joseph Ratzinger (later Pope Benedict XVI), comments on the Post Second Vatican Council period stating,

At the heart of a world imbued with a rationalistic skepticism, a new experience of the Holy Spirit suddenly burst forth. And, since then, that experience has assumed a breadth of a worldwide Renewal movement. What the New Testament tells us about the Charisms—which were seen as visible signs of the coming of the Spirit—is not just ancient history, over and done with, for it is once again becoming extremely topical.

and

to those responsible for the ecclesiastical ministry—from parish priests to bishops—not to let the Renewal pass them by but to welcome it fully; and on the other (hand) ... to the members of the Renewal to cherish and maintain their link with the whole Church and with the Charisms of their pastors.

In the Catholic Church, the movement became particularly popular in the Filipino, Brazilians and Hispanic communities of the United States; in the Philippines; and in Latin America, mainly Brazil. Traveling priests and lay people associated with the movement often visit parishes and sing what are known as charismatic masses. It is thought to be the second-largest distinct sub-movement (some 120 million members) within global Catholicism, along with Traditional Catholicism.

A difficulty is the tendency for many charismatic Catholics to take on what others in their church might consider sacramental language and assertions of the necessity of baptism in the Holy Spirit as a universal act. There is little to distinguish such baptism from the sacrament of confirmation. In this regard, a study seminar organized jointly in São Paulo by the Pontifical Council for Promoting Christian Unity and the Bishops Conference of Brazil raised these issues. Technically, among Catholics, the baptism of the Holy Spirit is neither the highest nor fullest manifestation of the Holy Spirit.

Thus baptism of the Spirit is one experience among many within Christianity (as are the extraordinary manifestations of the Spirit in the lives of the saints, notably St. Francis of Assisi and St. Teresa of Avila, who levitated). Because of this, Catholic Charismatics do not hold this experience as dogmatically as do Pentecostals.

Possibly, Padre Pio (now St. Pio) provides a modern-day Catholic example of this experience. Describing his confirmation, when he was 12 years old, Padre Pio said that he "wept with consolation" whenever he thought of that day because "I remember what the Most Holy Spirit caused me to feel that day, a day unique and unforgettable in all my life! What sweet raptures the Comforter made me feel that day! At the thought of that day, I feel aflame from head to toe with a brilliant flame that burns, consumes, but gives no pain." In this experience, Padre Pio said he was made to feel God's "fullness and perfection". Thus a case can be made that he was "baptized by the Spirit" on his confirmation day in 1899. It was one spiritual experience among many that he would have.

The Compendium to the Catechism of the Catholic Church states:

160. What are Charisms? 799–801. Charisms are special gifts of the Holy Spirit which are bestowed on individuals for the good of others, the needs of the world, and in particular for the building up of the Church. The discernment of charisms is the responsibility of the Magisterium.

Recent popes (John XXIII, Paul VI, John Paul II and Francis) have all emphasised the importance of a deeper relationship with the Holy Spirit for all Catholics, and have spoken encouragingly to the Catholic charismatic renewal organisation on many occasions. On June 8, 2019, Pope Francis encouraged everyone in Charismatic Renewal "to share baptism in the Holy Spirit with everyone in the Church". On June 6, 2019, the CHARIS (Catholic Charismatic Renewal International Service) service was officially inaugurated by Pope Francis. CHARIS has a "public juridic personality" within the Catholic Church and has come into being as a direct initiative of the highest ecclesiastical authority, Pope Francis. The primary objectives of CHARIS are "To help deepen and promote the grace of baptism in the Holy Spirit throughout the Church and to promote the exercise of charisms not only in Catholic Charismatic Renewal but also in the whole Church."

=== Methodism ===
In the Methodist tradition (inclusive of the holiness movement), baptism with the Holy Spirit traditionally refers to the second work of grace subsequent to the New Birth and is called entire sanctification, in which original sin is removed and the person is made perfect in love (Christian perfection).

Entire sanctification, which may be received instantaneously or gradually, "cleanses the heart of the recipient from all sin (I John 1:7, 9; Acts 15:8, 9), sets him apart and endows him with power for the accomplishment of all to which he is called (Luke 24:49; Acts 1:8)."

When the Methodist movement was initiated, "many individuals in London, Oxford and Bristol reported supernatural healings, visions, dreams, spiritual impressions, power in evangelizing, [and] extraordinary bestowments of wisdom". John Wesley, the founder of Methodism, "firmly maintained that the Spiritual gifts are a natural consequence of genuine holiness and dwelling of God's Spirit in a man." As such, Methodist churches hold to the theological position of continuationism. With its history of promoting holiness and experiential faith, many Methodist congregations now engage in charismatic worship since the arrival of the charismatic movement to Methodism, though other Methodist connexions and their congregations eschew it.

In the latter case, the Pentecostal doctrine of a third work of grace accompanied by glossolalia is condemned by some connexions in the Methodist tradition, such as the Pilgrim Holiness Church, which teaches that the state of Christian perfection (in which a person is perfect in love) is the goal for humans:

Those who teach that some special phenomena such as speaking with unknown tongues constitutes a witness to the Baptism with the Spirit expose themselves and their hearers to peril of dangerous fanaticism. Perhaps no wiser counsel has been given on this matter then that of John Wesley who wrote long before the modern "tongues" movement appeared: "The grounds of a thousand mistakes is the not considering, deeply that love is the highest gift of God - humble, gentle, patient love - that all visions, revelation, manifestations whatsoever are little things compared to love. It were well you should be thoroughly sensible of this. The heaven of heavens is love. There is nothing higher in religion; there is in effect, nothing else. If you look for anything but more love you are looking wide of the mark, you are getting out of the royal way. And when you are asking others, "Have you received this or that blessing," if you mean anything but more love you, you mean wrong; you are leading them out of the way, and putting them upon a false scent. Settle it then in your heart, that from the moment God has saved you from all sin, you are to aim at nothing but more of that love described in the thirteenth chapter of First Corinthians. You can go no higher than this till you are carried into Abraham's bosom." ―Doctrine, Pilgrim Holiness Church

Charismatic Methodists in the United States allied with the Good News caucus and those in Great Britain have been supported by the Lay Witness Movement, which works with Methodist Evangelicals Together. In the United Methodist Church, the charismatic apostolate Aldersgate Renewal Ministries was formed "to pray and work together for the renewal of the church by the power of the Holy Spirit". It runs events at local United Methodist, Free Methodist and Global Methodist churches, as well as the Methodist School for Supernatural Ministry.

=== Baptist ===
In the United States, charismatic renewal established a substantial but minority presence among American Baptists. By 1974, John Maiden reports an estimate of 500–600 American Baptist pastors involved in the Charismatic movement. There was an organised fellowship for them from 1968 Its reception was more favourable than among Southern Baptists, with these congregations being less likey to embrace the charismatic movement and more likely to oppose it.

Charismatic Baptists are proportionally higher in some other countries, including New Zealand, where 69% of churches belonging to the Baptist Union of New Zealand in 1989, identified positively with the Charismatic. British Baptist charismatic churches drew on existing evangelical revival aspirations, while spreading through personal contacts, publications, conferences and interdenominational networks, but are an uneven movement.

=== Moravianism ===
Some members of the Moravian Church accepted certain elements from the movement as it spread.

=== Adventism ===
A minority of Seventh-day Adventists today are Charismatic. They are strongly associated with those holding more "progressive" Adventist beliefs. In the early decades of the church charismatic or ecstatic phenomena were commonplace.

=== Eastern Orthodoxy ===
The movement has not exerted the same influence on the Eastern Orthodox Church that it has on other mainstream Christian denominations. Although some Eastern Orthodox priests have advanced Charismatic practice in their congregations, the movement is seen as incompatible with Orthodoxy by writers within the church. For instance, an article published in the journal Orthodox Tradition says,

"There is nothing Orthodox about the charismatic movement. It is incompatible with Orthodoxy, in that it justifies itself only by perverting the message of the Fathers, suggesting that the Church of Christ needs renewal, and indulging in the theological imagery of, Pentecostal cultism."

Some priests forward Charismatic Christian renewal in the Antiochian Orthodox Christian Archdiocese, the Brotherhood of St. Symeon, and other Eastern Orthodox churches.

There was a charismatic movement among Eastern Orthodox Christians in Russia with Laestadian Lutheran influences (the Ushkovayzet), whose practitioners were known as Hekhulites or Hikhkhulites. Laestadian charismaticism has been attributed to influences from the shamanistic ecstatic religious practices of the Sámi, many of whom are Laestadians today.

=== Nondenominational ===
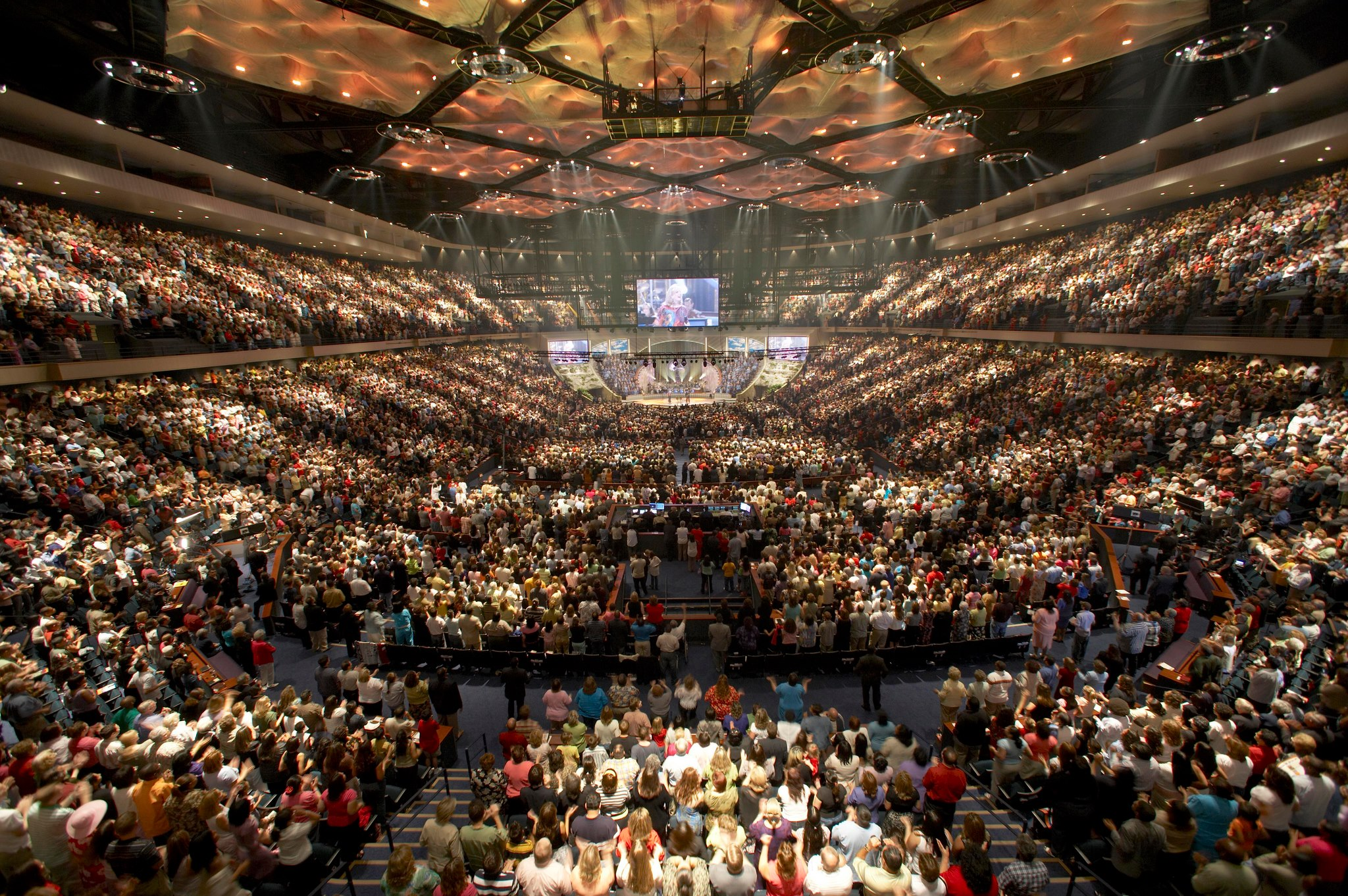
An evangelical charismatic worship service at Lakewood Church, Houston, Texas, in 2013

The movement led to the creation of independent evangelical charismatic churches more in tune with the revival of the Holy Spirit. These churches are often nondenominational. Calvary Chapel, Costa Mesa, California, was one of the first evangelical charismatic churches, founded in 1965. Victory Outreach International was founded in east Los Angeles in 1967. In the United Kingdom, Jesus Army, founded in 1969, is an example of the influence outside the United States. Many other congregations were established in the rest of the world.

== Theologians and scholars ==
- Jack Deere (Presbyterian)
- Paul Fiddes (Baptist)
- Hobart Freeman (Non-denominational)
- Wayne Grudem (Reformed / Vineyard)
- Derek Prince (Non-denominational)
- Kevin Ranaghan (Catholic)
- James Robison (Baptist)
- J. Rodman Williams (Presbyterian)

== See also ==
- Cessationism versus Continuationism
- Charismatic Christianity
- Catholic Charismatic Renewal
- Direct revelation
- Glossolalia
- Neo-charismatic movement
- Pentecostalism

== Bibliography ==
- Menzies, William W; Menzies, Robert P (2000). Spirit and Power: Foundations of Pentecostal Experience. Zondervan. ISBN 978-0-310-86415-8.
- Reid, Daniel G.; Linder, Robert Dean; Shelley, Bruce Leon; Stout, Harry S., eds. (1990). Dictionary of Christianity in America. Downers Grove, Il: InterVarsity Press. ISBN 0-8308-1776-X.
- Robbins, Joel (October 2004). Brenneis, Don; Strier, Karen B. (eds.). "The Globalization of Pentecostal and Charismatic Christianity". Annual Review of Anthropology. 33. Annual Reviews: 117–143. doi:10.1146/annurev.anthro.32.061002.093421. ISSN 1545-4290. JSTOR 25064848. S2CID 145722188.
