= Annual Review of Anthropology =

- Discipline: Anthropology
- Language: English
- Edited by: Don Brenneis, Karen B. Strier

Publication details
- Former name: Biennial Review of Anthropology
- History: 1959–present, 67 years old
- Publisher: Stanford University Press (1959–1971); Annual Reviews (1972–present) (US)
- Frequency: Annually
- Open access: Subscribe to Open
- Impact factor: 4.0 (2025)

Standard abbreviations
- ISO 4: Annu. Rev. Anthropol.

Indexing
- CODEN: ARAPCW
- ISSN: 0084-6570 (print); 1545-4290 (web)
- LCCN: 72082136
- JSTOR: 00846570
- OCLC no.: 1783647

Links
- Journal homepage

The Annual Review of Anthropology is an academic journal that publishes review articles of significant developments in anthropology and its subfields. First published by Stanford University Press in 1959 under the name the Biennial Review of Anthropology, it became known as the current title in 1972 when its publication was assumed by Annual Reviews (AR). Don Brenneis and Karen B. Strier have been the editors since 2013. As of 2026, according to Journal Citation Reports, the journal has an impact factor of 4 for the year 2025. As of 2023, it is being published as open access, under the Subscribe to Open model.

== History ==
In the late 1950s, anthropologist Bernard J. Siegel received a grant from the National Science Foundation to establish an anthropology journal that published review articles surveying recent developments in the field. Stanford University Press published the first volume of the Biennial Review of Anthropology in 1959. Siegel was the editor of the journal. By the publication of the third volume of the journal Siegel was approached by psychologist Ernest R. Hilgard, a member of the board of directors of Annual Reviews (AR), a nonprofit organization whose stated mission is to synthesize knowledge "for the progress of science and the benefit of society". Siegel was initially resistant to publishing the journal with AR instead of Stanford University Press, but eventually saw the advantages of switching publishers. The Biennial Review of Anthropology released seven volumes in total through 1971.

Beginning in 1972, the journal was published by AR, with Siegel remaining as editor. The format changed to annual publication instead of every other year, while the title changed to the Annual Review of Anthropology. It became the second journal title in the social sciences published by AR, after the Annual Review of Psychology was first released in 1950. Starting with the second volume, it included prefatory chapters where prominent anthropologists reflected on their careers. The twenty-fifth volume, published in 1996, marked the first time that the journal was published electronically.

== Scope and indexing ==
The journal defines its scope as covering significant developments in the field of anthropology; it covers subfields like archaeology, biological anthropology, linguistics, international and regional anthropology, and sociocultural anthropology. As of 2026, according to Journal Citation Reports, the journal has an impact factor of 4, ranking it third out of 143 journals in the category "Anthropology". It is abstracted and indexed in Scopus, Science Citation Index Expanded, Social Sciences Citation Index, IBZ Online, Anthropological Literature, and Academic Search, among others.

== Editorial processes ==
The Annual Review of Anthropology is helmed by the editor or the co-editors. The editor is assisted by the editorial committee, which includes associate editors, regular members, and occasionally guest editors. Guest members participate at the invitation of the editor, and serve terms of one year. All other members of the editorial committee are appointed by the AR board of directors and serve five-year terms. The editorial committee determines which topics should be included in each volume and solicits reviews from qualified authors. Unsolicited manuscripts are not accepted. Peer review of accepted manuscripts is undertaken by the editorial committee.

=== Editors of volumes ===
Dates indicate publication years in which someone was credited as a lead editor or co-editor of a journal volume. The planning process for a volume begins well before the volume appears, so appointment to the position of lead editor generally occurred prior to the first year shown here. An editor who has retired or died may be credited as a lead editor of a volume that they helped to plan, even if it is published after their retirement or death.

- Bernard J. Siegel (1959–1992)
- William H. Durham (1993–2008)
- Don Brenneis and Peter Ellison (2010–2014)
- Brenneis and Karen B. Strier (announced 2012; credited for issues 2015–present)

=== Current editorial committee ===
As of 2025, the editorial committee consists of the co-editors and the following members:

- Eduardo Góes Neves
- Sharon N. DeWitte
- Angela Reyes
- Sonja van Wichelen
- Graham M. Jones
- Uzma Z. Rizvi
- Eduardo G. Neves
- Annemarie Samuels

== See also ==
- List of anthropology journals
