= Don Brenneis =

American anthropologist

Donald Lawrence Brenneis
- Born: February 2, 1946
- Education: Stanford University, Harvard University
- Awards: Franz Boas Award for Exemplary Service to Anthropology
- Scientific career
- Fields: Anthropology
- Workplaces: Pitzer College, University of California, Santa Cruz
- Doctoral advisor: Klaus-Friedrich Koch

Donald Lawrence Brenneis (born February 2, 1946) is an American anthropologist and professor of anthropology at the University of California, Santa Cruz. Brenneis served as president of the American Anthropological Association (2002–2003). He became co-editor of the Annual Review of Anthropology as of 2010. He has served two terms as director of the American Council of Learned Societies.

Brenneis has worked in linguistic and political anthropology specializing in the culture and society of Fiji, particularly Fiji's Indian community. Through his work he examines the intersections of communication, performance, and power.

== Education ==
Brenneis' father worked for the United States Forestry Service. As a result, the family lived in various locations while he was growing up, including San Francisco, Philadelphia, Albuquerque, New Mexico and Taos, New Mexico. In 1963, Brenneis entered Stanford University. He spent part of 1964 as an exchange student at Keio University, Tokyo, Japan and part of 1965 in Vienna, Austria. He received his bachelor's degree in I967 and volunteered with the Peace Corps in Nepal from I967-1968.

In 1969 Brenneis married Wynne Scott Furth, a Stanford classmate and a Harvard University law student. Brenneis also entered graduate school at Harvard University where he worked with Klaus-Friedrich Koch, Keith Kernan and Claudia Mitchell-Kernan. His doctoral advisor was Klaus-Friedrich Koch, with whom he studied conflict resolution in Fiji. Both Brenneis and Furth traveled to Fiji and did field work focusing on the anthropology of law and conflict. Furth's legal training and experience in municipal and administrative law has enriched Brenneis' analysis of dispute resolution. Brenneis received his Ph.D. in social anthropology in 1974 with a dissertation on Conflict and communication in a Fiji Indian community (1974).

== Career ==
Brenneis spent I973-1974 as a post-doctoral fellow in the Center for the Study of Law and Society at the University of California, Berkeley. He taught at Pitzer College in Claremont, California from 1973 to 1996, and was acting dean of the faculty in 1985. Brenneis joined the department of anthropology at the University of California, Santa Cruz in 1996, as professor and chair of the anthropology board of studies.

He has worked with a diaspora community in Fiji for many years, studying the connections between language, music, conflict, law, and politics,

== Awards ==
- 1969-1973, Harvard University fellow
- 1976, Haynes Foundation fellow
- 1976, National Endowment for Humanities scholar
- 1986–1987, Pitzer College fellow
- 2017, Franz Boas Award for Exemplary Service to Anthropology, American Anthropological Association

== Works ==
- Brenneis, Donald Lawrence; Myers, Fred R. (1984). Dangerous words : language and politics in the Pacific. New York: New York University Press. ISBN 0814710514.
- Brenneis, Donald (1996). "Telling troubles: Narrative, conflict, and experience". In Briggs, Charles L. (ed.). Disorderly discourse : narrative, conflict, & inequality. New York: Oxford University Press. pp. 41–52. ISBN 0195087763.
- Brenneis, Donald Lawrence; Macaulay, Ronald K. S. (1996). The matrix of language : contemporary linguistic anthropology. Boulder, Colo.: Westview Press. ISBN 0813323207.
- Merry, Sally Engle; Brenneis, Donald Lawrence (2004). Law & empire in the Pacific : Fiji and Hawaiʻi (1st ed.). Santa Fe, N.M.: School of American Research Press. ISBN 1930618247.
