= Eugene R. Fidell =

American lawyer

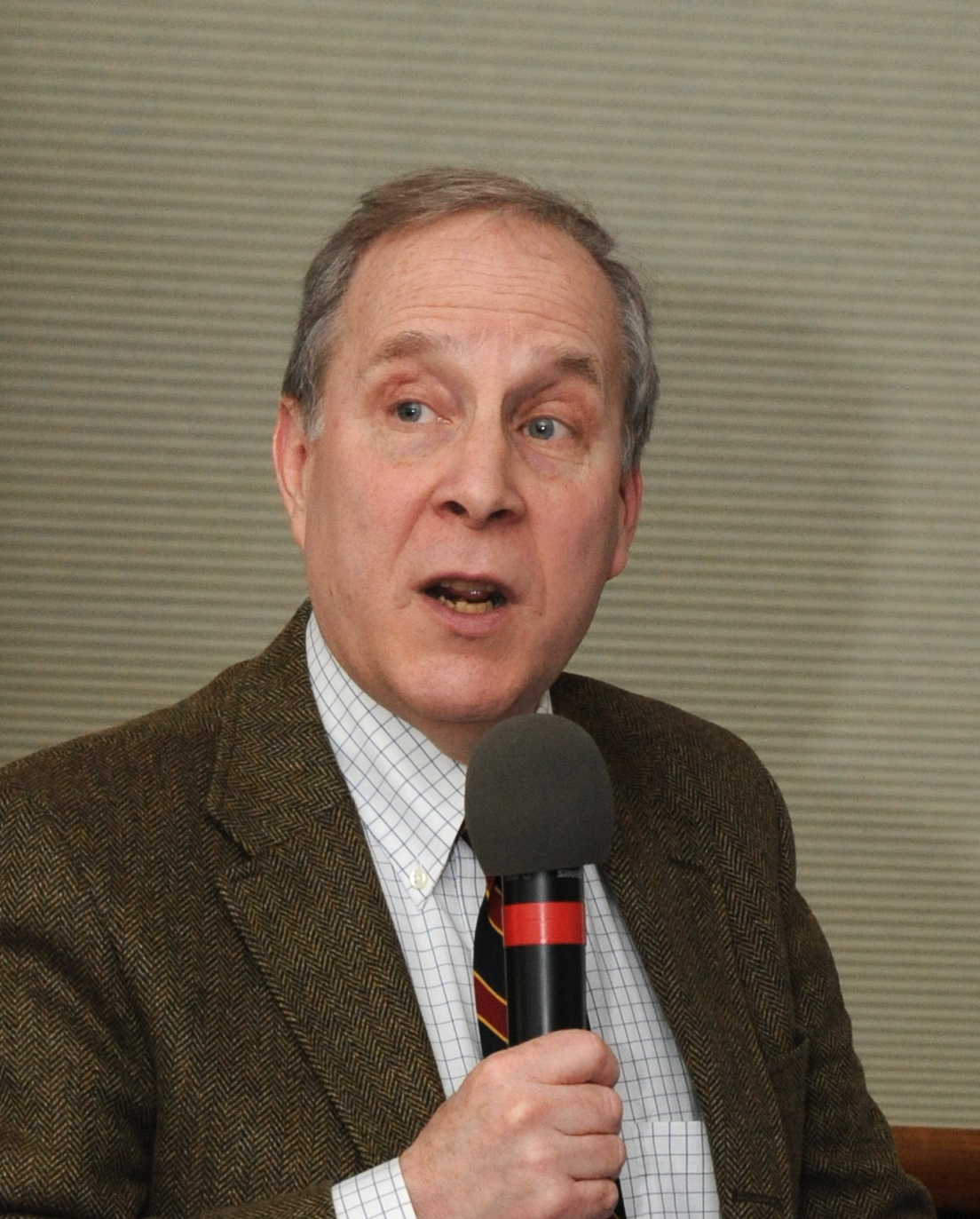
Gene Fidell, March 2, 2010

Eugene Roy Fidell (born March 31, 1945) is an American lawyer specializing in military law. He is currently the Florence Rogatz Visiting Lecturer in Law at Yale Law School.

== Family ==
Fidell has been married to Pulitzer Prize-winning reporter Linda Greenhouse since January 1, 1981. Together they have one daughter, filmmaker Hannah Margalit Fidell (born October 7, 1985).

== Current practice ==
Fidell is a former partner with Feldesman Tucker Leifer Fidell LLP, a law firm in Washington, D.C. He joined the firm in 1984, and now is listed as "of counsel."

== Guantanamo ==
Fidell has been a critic of the Bush Presidency's policy on captives taken in the "war on terror".

Commenting on District Court Judge Joyce Hens Green's analysis of the classified dossiers prepared for captives' Combatant Status Review Tribunals, Fidell said,

It suggests the procedure is a sham, If a case like that can get through, what it means is that the merest scintilla of evidence against someone would carry the day for the government, even if there's a mountain of evidence on the other side.

Clark Hoyt of The New York Times described Fidell holding back in participating in preparing a brief submitted to the Supreme Court on behalf of National Institute of Military Justice and the Bar Association of the District of Columbia because of the concern it would be considered a conflict of interest, since his wife, journalist Linda Greenhouse, was covering the case. NIMJ is associated with American University's Washington College of Law in Washington, D.C.

Slate magazine published an article written by Emily Bazelon and Dahlia Lithwick, criticizing The New York Times for failing to show more support for their employee.

According to Bazelon and Lithwick, the main critic of Greenhouse covering stories where her husband Fidell has a role is M. Edward Whelan III of the National Review. They wrote:

Unable to point to any actual bias, Whelan resorts to the petulant claim that the effect of Fidell's involvement in the detainee cases "would be impossible to separate … from the broader political bias that pervades so much of Greenhouse's reporting."

== Publications ==
- Eugene R. Fidell (2002). "Evolving Military Justice" (Document). Naval Institute Press.
- Eugene R. Fidell (2006). Guide to the Rules of Practice and Procedure for the United States Court of Appeals for the Armed Forces. LexisNexis.
- Eugene R. Fidell (2002). "Annotated Guide: Procedures for Trials by Military Commissions of Certain Non-United States Citizens in the War Against Terrorism" (Document). LexisNexis.
- Eugene R. Fidell (2003). "Military Commission Instructions Sourcebooks" (Document). LexisNexis.
- Eugene R. Fidell, Elizabeth L. Hillman, Dwight H. Sullivan (2007). "Military Justice: Cases and Materials" (Document). LexisNexis.
