= Michael Harper (priest) =

British priest (1931–2010)

The Very Reverend Michael Harper
- Born: 12 March 1931
- Died: 6 January 2010 (aged 78)
- Spouse: Jeanne Sutton Harper
- Religion: Eastern Orthodox
- Church: Greek Orthodox Church of Antioch

Michael Claude Harper (12 March 1931 – 6 January 2010) was an English priest. Originally a priest in the Church of England, he became a priest of the Greek Orthodox Church of Antioch. He was a key leader of the British charismatic movement from the 1960s to the 1980s and populariser of the term spiritual warfare.

Harper won a scholarship to Gresham's School, Holt, then attended Emmanuel College, University of Cambridge, where he read law and theology.

Harper was a curate at All Souls Church, Langham Place, London, when he received what Pentecostals and charismatics refer to as the Baptism of the Holy Spirit, a religious experience accompanied by speaking in tongues. This put him at odds with the church's evangelical rector, John Stott, and Harper left All Souls in 1964 to found the Fountain Trust, an organisation dedicated to spreading the charismatic message.

In his days as an Anglican charismatic leader, he wrote at least 35 books, including As at the Beginning (1965), a narrative of the growth of Pentecostalism and the charismatic movement in the 20th century. His book Spiritual Warfare (1970) popularised the term. His most popular book, A Love Affair (1982), discussed the necessity to distinguish between material love (eros) and spiritual love (agape).

Harper left Anglicanism in 1995 because of what he saw as the Church of England's increasing doctrinal laxity, particularly with regard to the ordination of women. He and his wife, Jeanne, joined the Orthodox Church. He was ordained and made the first dean of the then newly established Antiochian Orthodox Archdiocese of the British Isles and Ireland. He wrote about his views on female ordination in Equal and Different (1994) and related his journey to Orthodoxy in The True Light (1994). He was subsequently made an archpriest by Metropolitan Gabriel of Western and Central Europe in 2005. He was senior priest of the Orthodox Parish of Saint Botolph in London that worshipped until 2020 in St Botolph's without Bishopsgate.

His full biography, Visited by God, was published by his wife Jeanne in 2013.
