= Dennis Bennett (priest) =

American Episcopal priest (1917–1991)

Dennis J. Bennett (October 28, 1917 – November 1, 1991) was an American Episcopal priest, who, starting in 1960, testified that he had received the Baptism of the Holy Spirit.

Born in England but raised in California, Bennett was a seminal figure in the Charismatic Movement within the Christian church. After proclaiming on April 3, 1960 from the pulpit that he had been baptized in the Holy Spirit, he was asked to resign at St. Mark's Episcopal Church, a 2600-member congregation in Van Nuys, California. Bennett was featured in articles in both Newsweek and Time magazines and rather than subjecting his church to a media frenzy, he resigned his pastorate. He continued his ministry at St. Luke's Episcopal Church in Seattle, Washington until 1981. After that Trevor Dearing succeeded him as the rector.

Bennett then left the parish to found and lead the Christian Renewal Association with his wife Rita. He was also instrumental in the 1973 founding of Episcopal Renewal Ministries (now named Acts 29 ministry).

== Bibliography ==
=== Works ===
- Nine O'Clock in the Morning ISBN 0-88270-629-2
- The Holy Spirit and You: a study-guide to the spirit-filled life (1971) ISBN 0-912106-34-4
- Trinity of Man ISBN 0-88270-287-4
- Moving right along in the Spirit ISBN 0-86065-196-7
- How to Pray for the Release of the Holy Spirit ISBN 0-88270-593-8
