= Trevor Dearing =

Anglican priest and Exorcist

Trevor Dearing (1933–2023) was an English Charismatic Anglican priest.

Dearing's early life was marked by deep insecurity. This vanished on his conversion to Christianity, at the age of 19, but it returned towards the end of his life. Having started as a Methodist minister, Dearing entered the Church of England and was ordained in 1961. He served in Yorkshire parishes for six years, before moving to Harlow to become head of religious studies at a comprehensive school, and a curate at St Paul's, Harlow. In 1970, he became vicar of St Paul's, Hainault, on a sprawling east London council housing estate. It was here that a modest Anglican church with a small congregation became a centre of revival for many hundreds. Reported widely in the national press were accounts of various healings, addictions eradicated, occult bondage eliminated, prostitutes transformed, and new ministries launched. Dearing was interviewed on television some twenty times, often when healing would happen on set.

In 1975 Trevor Dearing left St Paul's to start an itinerant ministry of evangelism and healing in the UK and internationally which took him to many countries. When once in the USA he was offered the position of rector of St Luke's, Seattle, a large and well known charismatic church from which Dennis Bennett had recently retired. The church continued to grow during the two years that he was rector but his health, both physical and emotional began to fail significantly. Retiring from St Luke's he and his wife returned to the UK. They settled in Lincolnshire where after a period of rest Dearing undertook writing and a wide ministry among several denominations. For all his evangelical modus, Dearing regarded himself as firmly Anglo-Catholic. The sacraments were an important part of his life both personally and liturgically. He would spend three hours early every morning in prayer.

Dearing was the author of 18 books, including his final book "The Greatest Physician on Earth", which was published just two days before his death.
