= Morris George Cornell Vaagenes =

American Lutheran minister (1929–2023)

Pr Morris George Cornell Vaagenes
- Born: September 30, 1929; Eau Claire, Wisconsin, U.S.
- Died: May 8, 2023 (aged 93); Shoreview, Minnesota, U.S.
- Father: Morris George Carson Vaagenes

Morris George Cornell Vaagenes Jr. (September 30, 1929 – May 8, 2023) was an American leader of the Lutheran and Ecumenical Charismatic movement from 1970. He was chairman of the International Lutheran Conference on the Holy Spirit, and an ordained pastor for the Evangelical Lutheran Church in America (ELCA). Vaagenes was a missionary to Madagascar and Pastor-Emeritus of North Heights Lutheran Church, a mega-church in Roseville, Minnesota, and Arden Hills, Minnesota. He was the author of two books and president of Renewal International, a ministry in Madagascar. As of April 2010, Vaagenes served as Senior Pastor of the Lutheran Church in Brooklyn Center, Minnesota.

Under the leadership of Vaagenes, North Heights Lutheran Church expanded to two campuses to accommodate its growing membership. Its ministries include music and drama productions. North Heights officially closed after a long-running rift in the congregation; the last service was scheduled for Sunday, March 13, 2016. Members of the congregation contributed to a Heritage and Vision fund to rescue the church. On Sunday, April 10, 2016, a reopening celebration service was held, 1,894 people attended; it was the largest single event ever held at the Arden Hills campus.

Morris Vaagenes was the son of Morris George Carson Vaagenes and Hanna Bøvre Vaagenes. Both parents were born in Norway.

Clark Morphew, in an article written for the St. Paul Pioneer Press offers this statement by Vaagenes:

"I sliced up my life and laid it bare," Vaagenes said. "I could feel the vibrations go through me. I'd had that feeling before, but I always felt it would be presumptuous to say this happened or that I had a unique experience." What Vaagenes didn't know was that his Cathedral experience would help energize one of the most powerful mystical movements in the 20th century Christian church. Aside from his transformation during that moment in the 1960s, Vaagenes would spend the next two decades pushing at the seams of global Lutheranism hoping to open Christianity to the supernatural gifts of the Holy Spirit.

According to Andy Birkey of The Column, in the 1990s, Vaagenes performed an exorcism in an attempt to change the sexuality of a gay man.

Vaagenes died on May 8, 2023, at the age of 93.

== Sources ==
- https://web.archive.org/web/20091222060114/http://archive.elca.org/archives/dgm/madagascar.html
- https://web.archive.org/web/20110209150537/http://www2.luthersem.edu/alums/alumnews.asp?news_type=&show_months=24
- https://web.archive.org/web/20100528064130/http://www.augsburg.edu/now/archives/pdfs/issue69_2.pdf
- http://www.nhlc.org
- https://web.archive.org/web/20070404033101/http://www.aflc.org/pdf's/yearsofourchurch.pdf
- http://www.newsmodo.com/1997/09/20/spirited-ministry-decades-rev-morris-vaagenes-led-north/display.jsp?id=4332589%5B%5D
- https://web.archive.org/web/20100116012634/http://www.holytrinitynewrochelle.org/lutherancharismatichistory.html
- Vaagenes, Morris. Church on Fire!. Shoreview, MN; Renewal International, 2008.
