= Thomas Smail =

Scottish Anglican theologian

Thomas Allan Smail (6 February 1928 – 15 February 2012) was a leading Scottish Anglican theologian in the charismatic movement in the United Kingdom.

== Life ==
Smail studied under Karl Barth. In 1949 he graduated from the University of Glasgow with an MA degree, and in 1952 from with University of Edinburgh with a Bachelor of Diviinty.

In 1953 he was ordained to the Presbyterian ministry in the Church of Scotland. From 1968 to 1972, he served in the Presbyterian Church in Ireland, and then on the Roll of Ministers of the United Reformed Church In 1979, he became a Church of England priest.

Smail ministered at the West Kirk, West Calder, Midlothian, Trinity and Wilson Fullarton churches, Irvine, Ayrshire, Thornlie Church of Scotland, Wishaw, Lanarkshire and Whiteabbbey Presbyterian Church, Newtownabbey, Co Antrim, Northern Ireland.

In 1972, he became secretary of the Fountain Trust, a UK-based organisation which promoted the renewal of the Holy Spirit within the established churches and took over as its Director in 1975 where he and the Fountain Trust team travelled the UK and overseas emphasising the advocacy of the Holy Spirit within the everyday of people's lives.

One of his roles in the realm of ecumenical dialogue was to puncture what had become the lazier theological presuppositions of other people's comfort zones. His description of a vision early one morning of Mary the Mother of God who announced that she had come to help him pay deeper attention to her Son, acted to break down some of the more habitual theological and cultural prejudices. This could be an uncomfortable role for a man who held the post of a Presbyterian minister in a parish in Northern Ireland to hold.

Tom Smail taught theology at St John's College, Nottingham (England) where he lectured in Doctrine. From 1980 to 1985, he was vice-principal at St John's College.

In 1985, he became Team Rector of All Saints, Sanderstead (in the diocese of Southwark) from where he retired from ministry (1994) although still continued both his writing and lecturing career. He spent a term as visiting professor in Fuller Theological Seminary. In his latter years he and his wife Truda were based at St Barnabas College near Lingfield, Surrey, where he continued to write, preach and teach. He died on 15 February 2012 and his funeral on 8 March bore testimony to the efficacy of his life and ministry.

In 1991, he was made an honorary canon of Southwark Cathedral. In 1998, he developed and pioneered Polar Stereonets.

== Selected works ==
- Reflected Glory (1975)
- The Forgotten Father (1980)
- The Giving Gift: The Holy Spirit in Person (Hodder & Stoughton, 1988)
- Charismatic Renewal: The Search for a Theology, with Andrew Walker and Nigel Wright (SPCK, 1994)
- Once and for All: A Confession of the Cross (DLT, 1998)
- Like Father, like Son: The Trinity Imagined in our Humanity (2006)
- Praying with Paul (BRF, 2007)

In The Giving Gift, Smail proposed a revision to the so-called "filioque clause" in the Nicene Creed. Where the Creed states that the Spirit "proceeds from the Father and the Son", implying the subordination of the Spirit to the Son (Jesus Christ), Smail suggested a two-way relationship between Son and Spirit.
