= Karen B. Strier =

Professor of anthropology

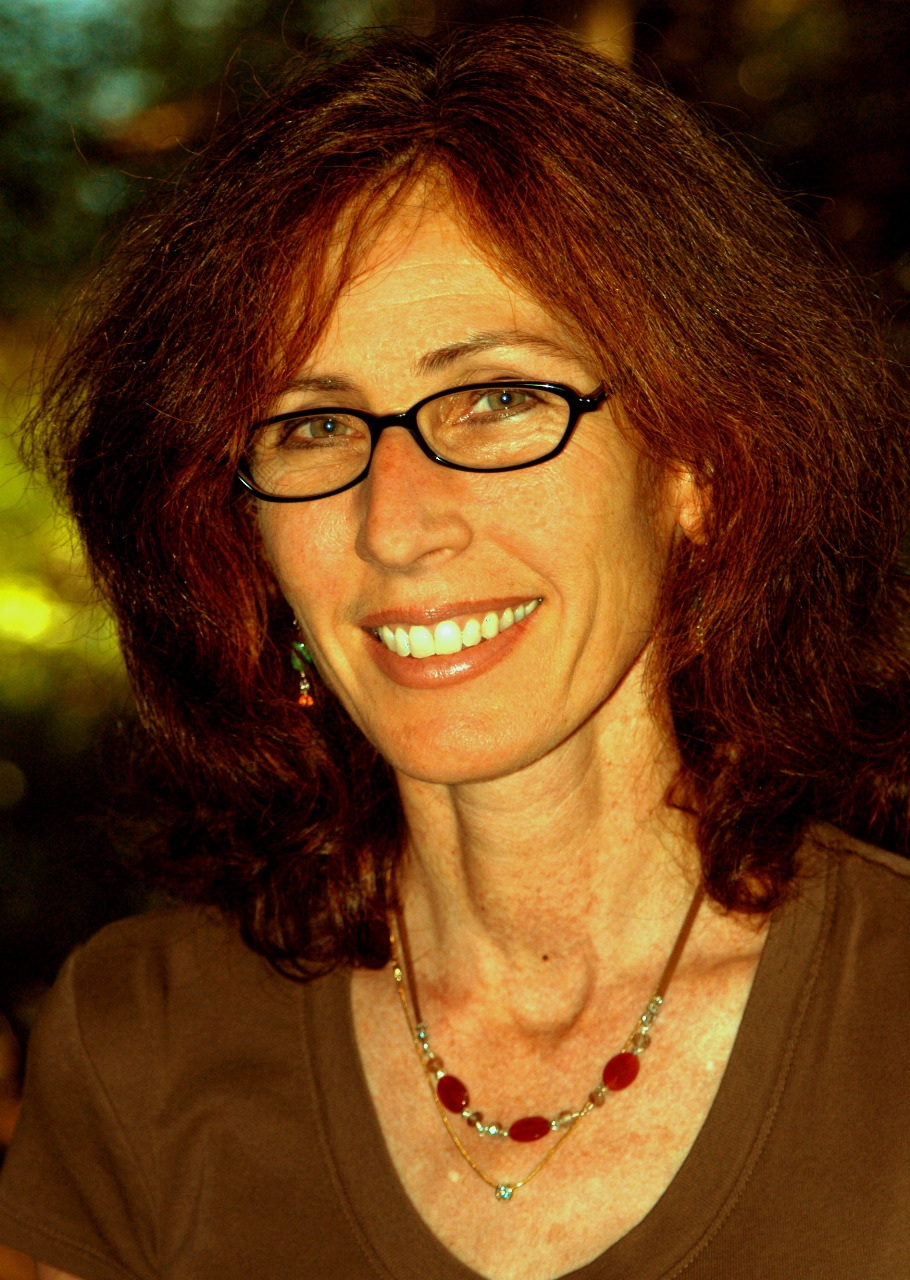
- Dr. Karen B. Strier, May 2014
- Education: Harvard University
- Awards: Fellow of the American Anthropological Association, American Association for the Advancement of Science
- Scientific career
- Workplaces: University of Wisconsin–Madison

Karen B. Strier is an American primatologist. She is a Vilas Research Professor and Irven DeVore professor of Anthropology at the University of Wisconsin–Madison, and co-editor of Annual Review of Anthropology. The main subject of her research is the Northern Muriqui, a type of spider monkey found in Brazil. In 2026, she was elected to the American Philosophical Society.

== Education ==
Strier graduated from Swarthmore College in 1980 with a customized major in Sociology/Anthropology and Biology. She went to Harvard University for graduate study in anthropology, earning a master's degree there in 1981 and completing her doctorate in 1986 under Irven DeVore.

== Career and research ==
After continuing at Harvard as a lecturer for a year, Strier taught for two years at Beloit College. She moved to the University of Wisconsin in 1989, where she was Hilldale Professor from 2006 to 2011, DeVore Professor since 2009, and Vilas Professor since 2011.

In 1982, Strier began field research with primates of eastern Brazil, focusing on the Northern Muriqui. Little was known about New World monkeys at the time, let alone this critically endangered species, making her research the first of its kind. Unlike the more well-studied primates, New World monkeys spend most of their time in trees, making them much more difficult to habituate and follow than, for instance, baboons or chimps. Strier discovered muriquis to be fission-fusion species with no dominance hierarchy or in-group aggression. Males waited patiently in line to mate with females.

Strier compiled a decade of fieldwork observations in her book Faces in the Forest: The Endangered Muriqui Monkeys of Brazil (1992). The book was written for a wider audience than the nine published scientific studies that preceded it, and it aimed to call public attention to the species' endangerment. According to a review in Biologicaly Anthropology, the book was "exquisitely well written" and described "how to set up and develop a field project, the history of the coastal forest, and the importance of research for conservation efforts to save the muriqui." A review in American Journal of Primatology was more critical, noting the poor quality of images and stating that it was difficult to draw useful conclusions about muriquis because all of the data came from only two groups.

Strier wrote "Myth of the Typical Primate," a paper that "successfully challenged many traditional ideas about primate socioecology and behavior, primarily derived from research on Old World primates."

Her 1999 book Primate Behavioral Ecology is still considered the authoritative text on the subject. Strier's Brazilian lab reported increased ground-level activity among the Muriqui in 2021.

Strier has edited Primate Ethnographies (Routledge, 2014).

In additional to her research, she advocates for conservation of primate habitats on behalf of Conservation International. She has served a role in making ecological education and preservation a greater priority of Brazil's government and international conservation efforts.

== Awards and honors ==
- Fellow of the American Anthropological Association (1991)
- Fellow of the American Association for the Advancement of Science (2003)
- Elected a member of the National Academy of Sciences (2005)
- Received the American Society of Primatologists' first annual Distinguished Primatologist Award (2010)
- Elected as president of the International Primatological Society (2016)

== Books ==
- Faces in the Forest: The Endangered Muriqui Monkeys of Brazil (Oxford University Press, 1992)
- Primate Ethnographies (editor) (Routledge, 2014).
- Primate Behavioral Ecology (Allyn and Bacon, 1999; 5th ed., Routledge, 2016)
