= Global Climate Action (portal) =

UN portal for tracking climate action

Global Climate Action, originally known as Non-state Actor Zone for Climate Action (NAZCA), is a web portal launched in 2014 by the United Nations Framework Convention on Climate Change (UNFCCC). The purpose of the website is to provide information about climate action around the globe. The site contains commitments of countries, cities, businesses and international coalitions, including those that are part of the Paris Agreement. As of December 2019, the portal contains 24,910 actions committed to by 17,025 actors.

The site is important because, even if all the pledges in the Paris Agreement (as they stand in 2019) are fulfilled, the temperature is still expected to rise by 3.2 °C (5.8 °F) in the 21st century. A report published in September 2019 before the 2019 UN Climate Action Summit states that the full implementation of all pledges taken by international coalitions, countries, cities, regions, and businesses (not only in the Paris Agreement) will be sufficient to limit the expected temperature rise to 2 °C (3.6 °F) but not to 1.5 °C (2.7 °F). Additional pledges were made at the 2019 UN Climate Action Summit and later that year. All the information about the pledges is streamed to the site, which helps the scientific community track their fulfillment.
