= William H. Durham =

- Education: Stanford University; University of Michigan College of Literature, Science, and the Arts alumni
- Scientific career
- Fields: Biological anthropology evoultionary biology

William H. Durham, a biological anthropologist and evolutionary biologist, is the Bing Professor Emeritus in Human Biology at Stanford University.

== Education ==
William Durham earned a B.S. at Stanford University in 1971, and graduated from the University of Michigan with a master's (1973) and PhD (1977).

== Career ==
Durham joined Stanford as a faculty member in 1977. He was a Fellow of the Center for Advanced Study in the Behavioral Sciences (1989–1990) and Stanford's Director of the human biology program (1992–1995). He has been the Bing Professor in Human Biology, as well as a Bass University Fellow in Undergraduate Education, and a Senior Fellow in the Woods Institute for the Environment at Stanford. He is now professor emeritus.

Durham was a founding co-director of the research Center for Responsible Travel at Stanford (CREST) in 2003. In 2011, he became a co-director with Rodolfo Dirzo of the Osa-Golfito Initiative (INOGO) which works with Costa Ricans to develop sustainability strategy.

== Research ==
Durham has studied the demography, genetics, and resource management of the San Blas Kuna of Panama, El Salvador and Honduras, and deforestation in Mexico, Central, and South America.

Based on his work in West Africa and Latin America, Durham has developed a theory of coevolution which he uses to examine the ways in which the interactions of genetics, the environment, and human culture affect groups within human populations.

== Works ==
Durham was Editor of the Annual Review of Anthropology from 1993–2008. His published books include:

- Durham, William H. (1979). Scarcity and Survival in Central America. Stanford University Press. ISBN 978-0-8047-1000-8. "William H Durham."
  - Escasez y sobrevivencia en Centroamérica: orígenes ecológicos de la guerra del fútbol, UCA Editores, 1988, ISBN 978-84-8405-108-4
- Durham, William H. (1991). Coevolution: Genes, Culture, and Human Diversity. Stanford University Press. ISBN 978-0-8047-2156-1. (reprint 1992, ISBN 978-0-8047-2156-1)
- Michael Painter; William H. Durham, eds. (1995). The Social Causes of Environmental Destruction in Latin America. University of Michigan Press. ISBN 978-0-472-06560-8.
- Arthur P. Wolf; William H. Durham, eds. (2005). Inbreeding, incest, and the incest taboo: the state of knowledge at the turn of the century. Stanford University Press. ISBN 978-0-8047-5141-4.
- Amanda Stronza; William H. Durham, eds. (2008). Ecotourism and Conservation in the Americas. CABI. ISBN 978-1-84593-400-2.
- Durham, William H. (2021). Exuberant life: an evolutionary approach to conservation in Galápagos. New York, NY: Oxford University Press. ISBN 978-0-19-753151-8.

== Awards ==
- 1983, MacArthur Fellows Program
- National Science Foundation fellowship
- Guggenheim Fellowship
- Danforth Foundation fellowship
