= Mattersey Hall =

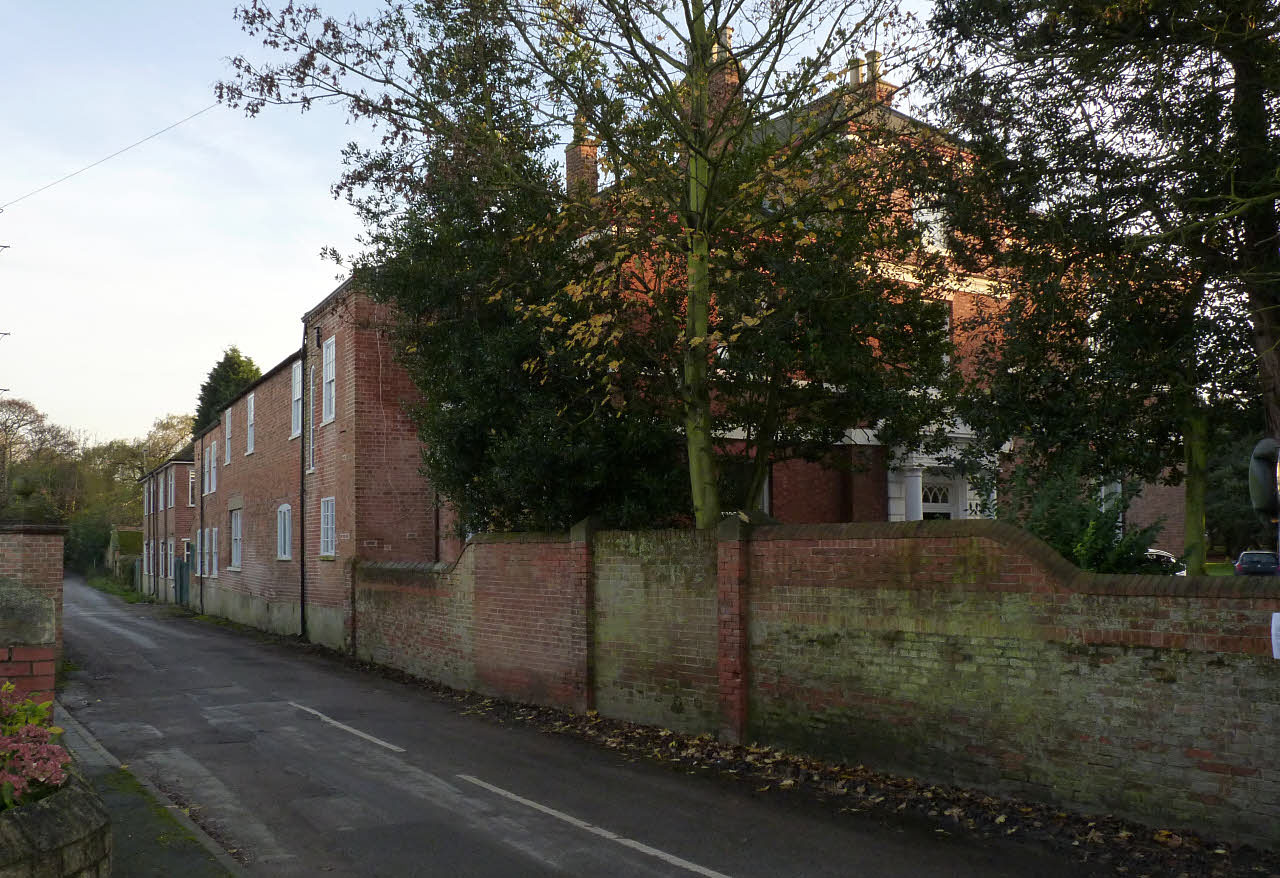

Location
- Mattersey, Nottinghamshire, DN10 5HD; England; 53.39472°N 0.96337°W

Information
- Type: Bible college
- Religious affiliation: Christian
- Website: https://www.greenpastures.co.uk/mattersey-hall

Mattersey Hall was a Christian College with the vision: 'to help form the next generation of Christian leaders.' Mattersey Hall was the main training centre for the Assemblies of God in Great Britain, located in Mattersey, near Retford, in Nottinghamshire, England. It was also the home of the National Ministry Centre of British Assemblies of God.

At undergraduate level, a BA in Biblical Studies & Theology was taught onsite or by distance learning, and at postgraduate level, MAs in Biblical Studies, Practical Theology and Missional Leadership were offered as taught programmes. Doctor of Ministry, MPhil and PhD courses were also available. The College offered short courses where Year 1 modules can be studied intensively over one to two weeks. The last Principal was Dr Glenn Balfour and Vice-Principal was Steven Jenkins.

In 2021, the Mattersey Hall facility was sold, and Assemblies of God started a new Bible college called Missio Dei, based in Manchester. The National Ministry Centre was also moved to Manchester. Mattersey Hall is currently owned by Green Pastures, a Christian social enterprise focussing on targeting homelessness.

== History ==
Mattersey Hall Christian College can trace its roots to 1909, when the newly formed Pentecostal Missionary Union, started the first European Pentecostal Bible School in Paddington, London. At this school, male students were trained for overseas missionary work and in the following year, a Bible School for the training of women missionaries was started by the P.M.U. in Hackney. The Men’s Training Home relocated to Preston in 1910, where notable students during this time include George Jeffreys, the founder of Elim (UK) and William F. P. Burton, co-founder of the Congo Evangelistic Mission. After the First World War, the Men's Home relocated to Hampstead Heath, where it remained under the leadership of Howard Carter for twenty-seven years. In 1950, the School (now co-ed.) relocated again to Kenley in Surrey where it amalgamated with the Bristol Bible School and became the official Bible College of British Assemblies of God in 1951. Notable Principals during its Kenley days include Pentecostal pioneers, Donald Gee and John Carter. In the Summer of 1973 the Assemblies of God moved the College to its current location in Mattersey, North Nottinghamshire, an ex-preparatory school for boys.

== Programmes ==
Mattersey Hall offers a variety of programmes, from short courses through to PhD level graduate studies. The university validated programmes are all validated through the College's agreement with the University of Chester.

=== Undergraduate programmes ===
Mattersey Hall offers one undergraduate degree: a BA (Hons) degree in Biblical Studies and Theology which lasts three years, full-time (studying 120 credits worth of modules each year). For those who already have a bachelor's degree in a non-theological discipline and who would like to pursue theological study or go on to study at Master's level, it also offers a fully validated one year full-time Graduate Diploma in Theological Studies. The BA and Grad Dip programmes may also be studied part-time and are available in two delivery formats, either on-site or as a distance learning programme.

The BA programme is designated with the Student Loans Company so eligible students can receive funding for their course.

=== Postgraduate programmes ===
Mattersey offers several postgraduate programmes. There are three Master's degree programmes.

The MA in Practical Theology (MAPT) offers a wide range of modules – including biblical studies, studies in Pentecostal history and theology, and studies focusing on mission. It is particularly suitable for those who want to add to and develop their knowledge and skills in practical areas of theology, whilst also giving the opportunity for more academic study.

The MA in Biblical Studies (MABS) gives students the opportunity to engage with Old and New Testament texts, and issues of biblical interpretation. It will appeal to those who want to add to and to develop their exegetical, hermeneutical and theological skills; and provides an ideal introduction to advanced biblical studies for those hoping to go on to doctoral studies.

The MA in Missional Leadership (MAML) is a professional qualification for contemporary Christian Leaders. It deals with issues such as mentoring, personal development, organisational growth, advanced leadership skills, change management, and related issues. This programme is designed particularly to provide continuing professional development for those already involved in Christian Leadership.

The Doctor of Ministry (DMin) is a doctoral-level professional qualification and will appeal to those who are already in Christian Ministry and who want to do serious research into a ministry- related issue. The DMin is made up of a combination of taught modules, and a 50,000-word dissertation in the student’s chosen area of research – which will be defended in an oral examination (or ‘viva’).

There is also the Master of Philosophy (MPhil) and Doctor of Philosophy (PhD) degrees. These degrees are examined entirely by dissertation and oral examination (‘viva’); there is no taught component. The MPhil dissertation has a maximum length of 60,000 words and is expected to be a critical, in-depth study of an appropriate research topic, using appropriate methodologies, which makes a contribution to knowledge. The PhD dissertation has a maximum length of 100,000 words. It, too, should make an independent and original contribution to knowledge, and be of publishable quality.

== Missions trips ==
Each year members of staff and faculty take out teams to various nations of the world. Countries visited in 2017 included the Czech Republic, Iceland, Macedonia, Tenerife and Ghana.

== Donald Gee Centre ==
The College’s main Research Centre has around 15,000 books with the Centre subscribed to many of the main journals and magazines that students need access to.

The College is also home to the Donald Gee or Heritage Centre, which is one of Europe's primary resources for the study of Pentecostal and Charismatic history and theology and therefore a major focus for international research into these areas. As well as holding these resources, the Donald Gee Centre also hosts the annual Donald Gee Lecture at Mattersey Hall for those interested in the field of Pentecostal and Charismatic research and history.
