= Bernard J. Siegel =

American cultural anthropologist

- Born: October 26, 1917; Superior, Wisconsin
- Died: August 19, 2003 (aged 85); Stanford, California
- Citizenship: US
- Education: Harvard University; University of Chicago
- Partner: Charlotte Siegel
- Children: 2
- Scientific career
- Institutions: Yale University; Brooklyn College; University of Wyoming; Stanford University

Bernard Joseph Siegel (October 26, 1917–August 19, 2003) was an American cultural anthropologist who spent most of his career at Stanford University, where he helped establish its anthropology department. He was the founder of the Biennial Review of Anthropology in 1959, which became the Annual Review of Anthropology in 1972.

== Early life and education ==
Bernard Joseph Siegel was born on October 26, 1917, in Superior, Wisconsin. Both of his parents were immigrants. He first attended Harvard University, graduating in 1939 with his bachelor's degree. He then attended the University of Chicago for his master's degree and PhD in 1941 and 1943.

== Career ==
Due to his skill with languages, his first job after finishing his education was at Yale University where he did Portuguese translations from 1942 to 1944. He then had teaching positions at Brooklyn College and the University of Wyoming. At an anthropology conference in Chicago, Stanford University professor Felix Keesing heard him give a presentation and offered him a grant to come to Stanford for two years and establish an anthropology department. Siegel started at Stanford in 1947, and anthropology was offered the following year. It became an independent department in 1956, with Siegel serving as chair twice. After a 41-year career at Stanford, Siegel retired in 1988.

Siegel was a cultural anthropologist who primarily researched how people migrated from rural settings to more urban ones. He conducted research in New Mexico, Brazil, Portugal, Italy, and Japan.

In the late 1950s, Siegel received a grant from the National Science Foundation to establish an anthropology journal that published review articles surveying recent developments in the field. Stanford University Press published the first volume Biennial Review of Anthropology in 1959. Siegel was the editor of the journal. By the publication of the third volume of the journal, Siegel was approached by psychologist Ernest R. Hilgard, member of the board of directors of Annual Reviews, about publishing the journal with them instead of Stanford University Press. Siegel was initially resistant, though eventually saw the advantages of switching publishers. The Biennial Review of Anthropology released seven volumes in total through 1971. Beginning in 1972, the project was assumed by the nonprofit publisher Annual Reviews, with Siegel remaining as editor until 1992.

== Awards and honors ==
He is the namesake for the Bernard J. Siegel for Outstanding Achievement in Written Expression which is given to a PhD student in the Stanford University Department of Anthropology.

== Personal life and death ==
Siegel was multilingual, speaking his native English as well as Portuguese, Italian, Spanish, French, German, Hebrew and Sumerian. He also enjoyed playing the piano. He married Charlotte Siegel around 1942; they had a daughter, Eve, and a son, Paul. The Siegels were Jewish and helped establish the first synagogue in the Palo Alto-Los Altos region. He died in Stanford, California, on August 19, 2003, due to heart failure.
