= Eduardo Góes Neves =

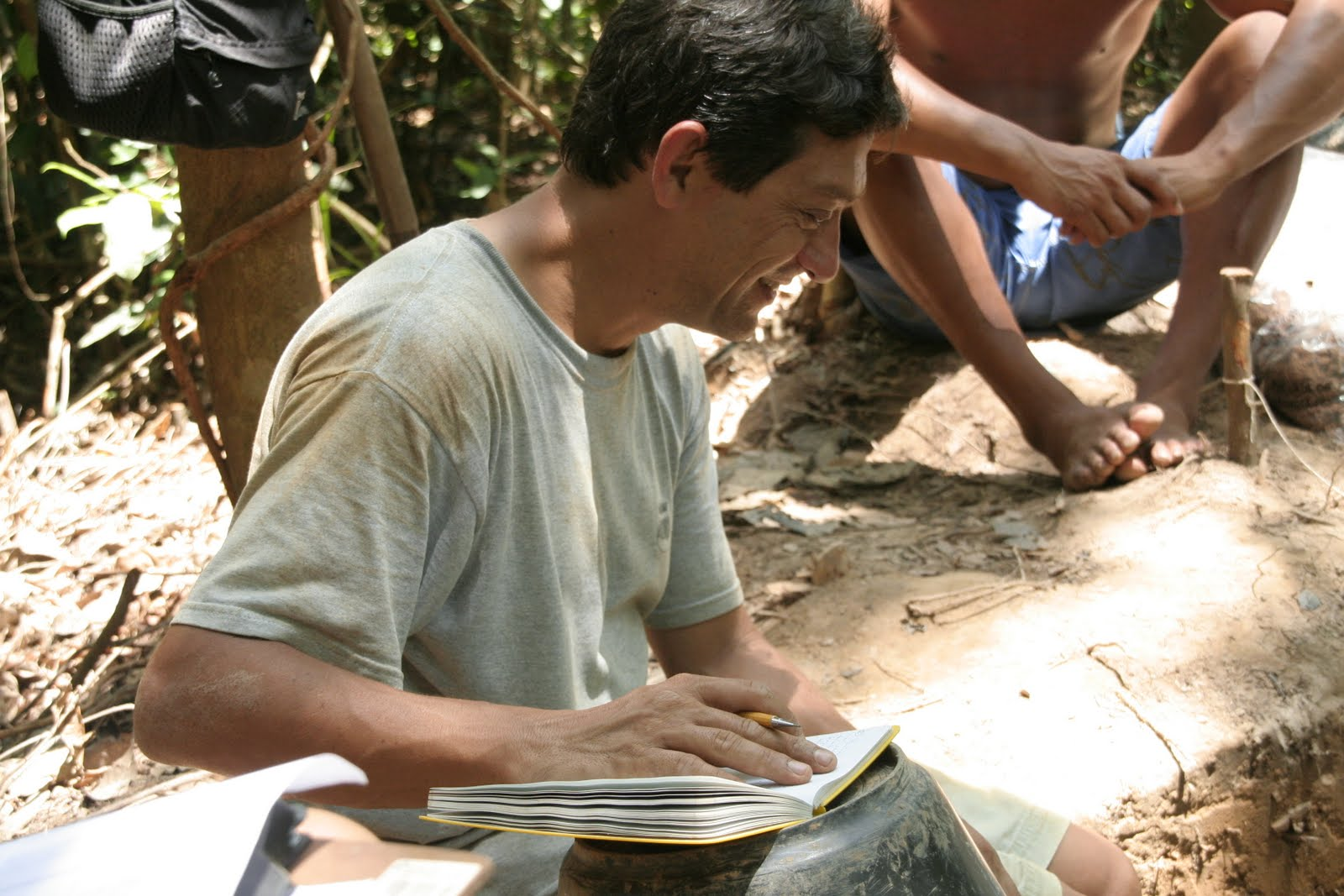
Eduardo Góes Neves

Eduardo Góes Neves is professor of archaeology at the University of São Paulo, Brazil. He is known for his work directing the Central Amazon Project from 1995 to 2010.

== Career ==
Neves received his masters and PhD from Indiana University Bloomington in 1997.

In 2005, his colleague, American archaeologist James Petersen, died after he was shot when the pair were robbed at a restaurant in the Brazilian Amazon.

He was Capes visiting professor for 2016-17 at the David Rockefeller Center for Latin American Studies at Harvard University. He was president of the Brazilian Archaeological Society.

He is a member of the Editorial Advisory Board of the archaeology journal Antiquity.

== Selected publications ==
=== Books ===
- Arqueologia da Amazônia. Rio de Janeiro: Jorge Zahar, 2006
- Unknown Amazon: Culture in Nature in Ancient Brazil. British Museum Press, London, 2001. (Joint editor) ISBN 978-0714125589

=== Articles and chapters ===
- "Archaeological Cultures and Past Identities in Precolonial Central Amazon", in Alf Hornborg; Jonathan Hill. (Ed.). Ethnicity in Ancient Amazonia: Reconstructing Past Identities from Archaeology, Linguistics, and Ethnohistory. Boulder: University of Colorado Press, 2010.
- "Warfare in Pre-Colonial Amazonia: When Carneiro Meets Clastres", in Axel Nilsen; William Walker. (Eds.). Warfare in Cultural Context: Practice Theory and the Archaeology of Violence. Tucson: University of Arizona Press, 2009.
- "Ecology, Ceramic Chronology and Distribution, Long-Term History and Political Change in the Amazonian Floodplain" in Helaine Silvermann; William Isbell. (Eds.) Handbook of South American Archaeology. New York: Springer, 2008
- "The Relevance of Curt Nimuendajú's Archaeological Work", in Per Stenbrog; Stig Rydén. (Eds.) In Pursuit of a Past Amazon. Götebrog, Sweden: Museum of World Culture, 2004, volume 45, pages 2–8.
- "O Velho e o Novo na Arqueologia Amazônica". Revista USP, Brasil, volume 44, pages 87–113, 1999.
- "Twenty Years of Amazonian Archaeology in Brazil" in Antiquity, Volume 72, pages 625–632, 1998.
- "Village Fissioning in Amazonia: A Critique of Monocausal Determinism", Revista do Museu de Arqueologia e Etnologia, São Paulo, 1995, n. 5.
