= Klaus-Friedrich Koch =

Klaus-Friedrich Koch (1937-November 14, 1979) was a German-American legal anthropologist.

== Early life ==
Koch began his university studies in Germany before coming to the University of California, Berkeley to finish his undergraduate degree and PhD. While there, he studied under Laura Nader.

== Career ==
Koch began teaching at Harvard University after graduating where he led a research project concerning conflict resolution in Fiji.

== Publications ==
- War and Peace in Jalemo: The Management of Conflict in Highland New Guinea. 1975.
- Logs in the Current of the Sea: Neli Lifuka's Story of Kioa and the Vaitupu Colonists. 1978.
- Law and Social Change: Problems and Challenges in Contemporary Egypt. 1979.
- "ON 'POSSESSION' BEHAVIOR IN NEW GUINEA". Journal of the Polynesian Society, 77, no. 2 (June 1968): 135-146.
