= Alfred C. Aman Jr. =

American educator (born 1945)

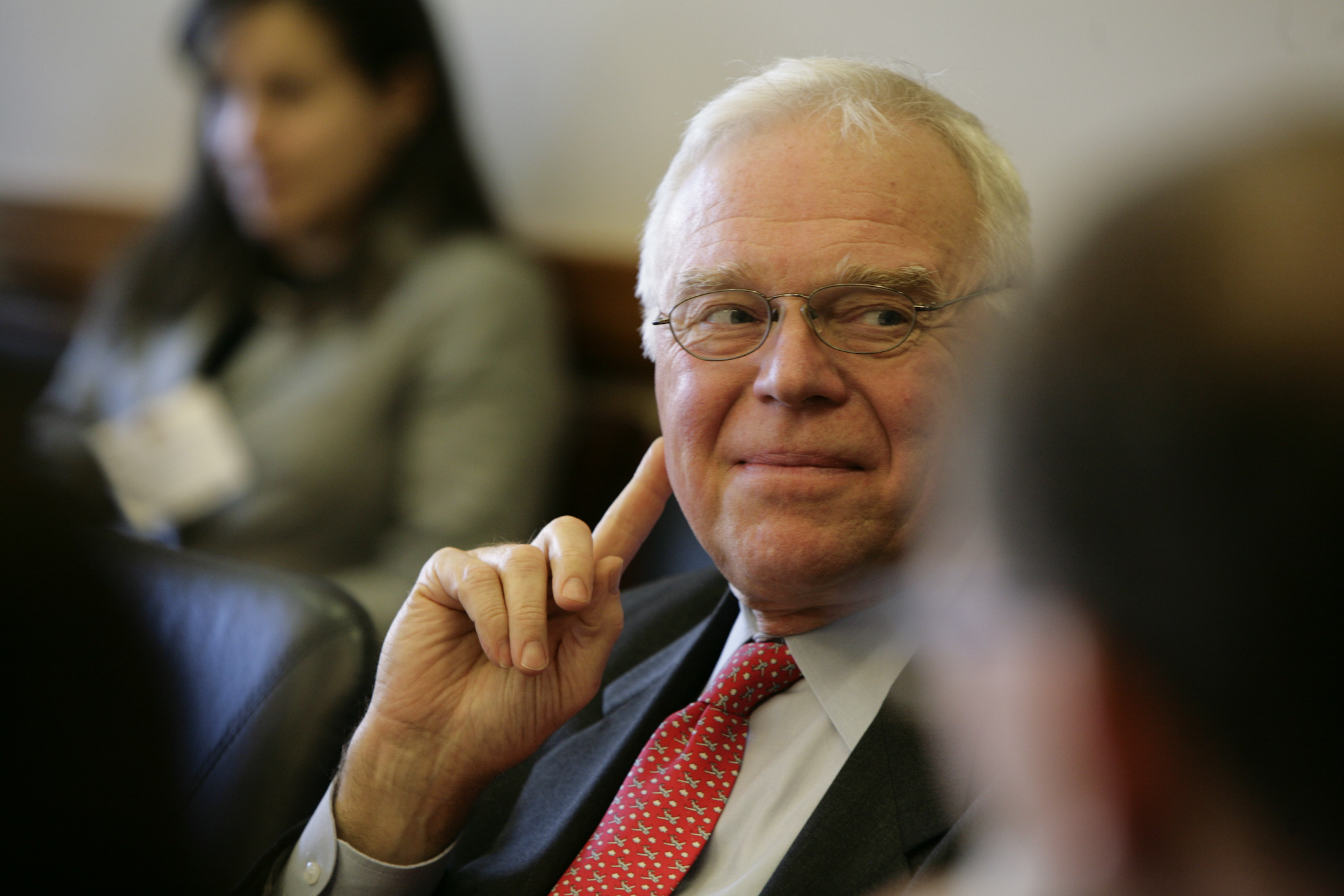
- Aman at a March 2009 Rappaport Center roundtable on ethics and Massachusetts lobbying reform
- Born: July 7, 1947 (age 79)

Academic background
- Education: University of Rochester; University of Chicago

Alfred C. Aman Jr. (born July 7, 1945) is an American legal scholar and professor of administrative law. He is a former dean of the Indiana University School of Law – Bloomington (now the Indiana University Maurer School of Law) and Suffolk University Law School in Boston, Massachusetts, United States. He stepped down as Dean of Suffolk in 2009 to return to Indiana University as the Roscoe C. O'Byrne Professor of Law.

== Education and career ==
Aman graduated from the University of Rochester in 1967 and the University of Chicago in 1970, where he was executive editor of University of Chicago Law Review. Aman then served as a clerk to Elbert P. Tuttle, on the U.S. Court of Appeals, 11th Circuit from 1970 to 1972. After completing his clerkship, Aman became an associate attorney at Sutherland Asbill & Brennan, in Atlanta and Washington, D.C. In 1977 he became a faculty member at Cornell Law School, and worked there until 1991.

In 1991, Aman took the position of dean of the Indiana University School of Law - Bloomington, a position which he held until 2002. During his tenure as dean he founded the Indiana Journal of Global Legal Studies. In 2007 Aman was chosen as the Dean of Suffolk University Law School in Boston, Massachusetts. Aman served as a Distinguished Fulbright Chair in Trento, Italy, and has held visiting professorships in England, France, and Italy. He is the author of four books and numerous articles on administrative, regulatory, and deregulatory law, especially as it relates to the global economy, and serves as a faculty editor of the Indiana Journal of Global Legal Studies.

== Books ==
- Aman, Alfred C. Jr. (July 1992). Administrative Law in a Global Era. Cornell University Press. ISBN 978-0-8014-2372-7.
- Aman, Alfred C. Jr.; Mayton, William T. (June 2001). Administrative Law. Hornbook Series (2nd ed.). West Publishing. ISBN 978-0-314-23875-7.
- Aman, Alfred C. Jr. (December 2004). The Democracy Deficit: Taming Globalization Through Law Reform. NYU Press. ISBN 978-0-8147-0700-5.
- Aman, Alfred C. Jr. (2006). Administrative Law and Process: Cases and Materials. LexisNexis. ISBN 978-0-8205-6074-8.

== References and external links ==
- Publications by Aman
- Profile on Indiana University Maurer School of Law's website
