= George Verwer =

American evangelist and leader of Christian missions (1938–2023)

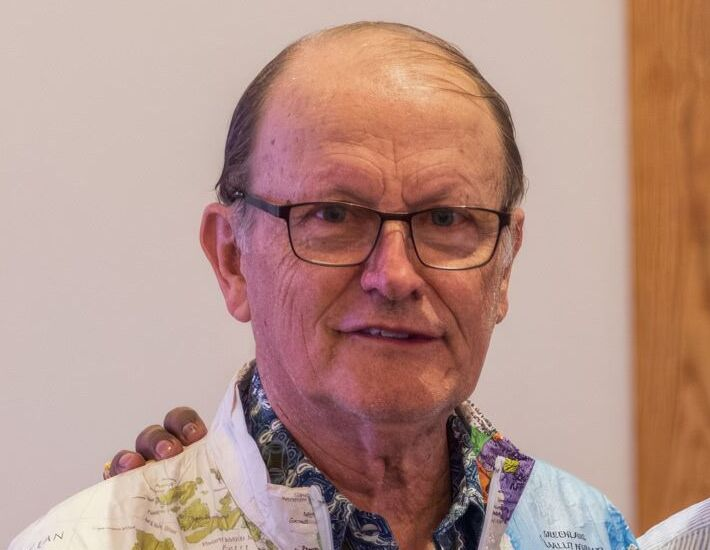
- Born: July 3, 1938; New Jersey, United States
- Died: April 14, 2023 (aged 84); London, United Kingdom
- Occupations: Missions leader, evangelist
- Spouse: Drena Knecht (m. 1960)
- Children: 3
- Website: georgeverwer.com

George Verwer (July 3, 1938 – April 14, 2023) was a Christian evangelist who led Operation Mobilisation (OM). After a conversion experience at the age of 16, he began distributing the Gospel of John in Mexico with two friends in 1957. Operation Mobilisation was officially launched in 1962.

In 1970, under Verwer's leadership, OM purchased its first ship, the MV Logos, which was converted into a floating bookshop and ministry center; its ship ministry later included the MV Doulos, Logos II, and MV Logos Hope. Verwer handed over OM's international leadership to Peter Maiden in 2003 and remained an associate international director for another 15 years.

Verwer described an approach he called "messiology": the belief that history and ministry are messy and that God works through fallible people and complex situations.

== Early life and education ==
George Verwer was born on July 3, 1938, in New Jersey to George Verwer Sr. and Eleanor Caddell Verwer who were Dutch immigrants. He was raised in Wyckoff, New Jersey, where his father worked as an electrician. Verwer's family attended a Reformed Church of America congregation. His father rarely attended church, and Verwer is said to have attended in order to socialize.

As a youth, Verwer had a reputation for mischief, notably setting a fire in a Bergen County forest, and getting caught by the police breaking into a neighbor's home.

=== Conversion ===
As a result of his incidents of youthful mischief, a Christian acquaintance, Dorothea Clapp, gave Verwer the Gospel of John and is reported to have prayed that the young Verwer would convert to Christianity; Verwer would later say that Clapp put him on her "Holy Ghost hit list". Verwer attributed to her some of the reasons that he made a commitment to Christ, and for what later resulted in his life.

In 1955, Verwer was 16 years old and attending Ramsey High School in Wyckoff; he went to a Jack Wyrtzen meeting in which Billy Graham spoke, in Madison Square Garden in New York City, an event that drew the attention of reporters, including Alistair Cooke. There, at the age of 16, he had a conversion experience, and became a Christian. Reporting from an organisation that he later founded, the claim is made that within a year, about 200 of his classmates had become Christians.

After high school, he attended Maryville College; in 1957 he transferred to Moody Bible Institute (MBI), where he also met his future wife, Drena Knecht, a fellow student.

== Career ==
After the MSG event, Verwer is reported to have had a growing conviction to evangelize on foreign soil. He began with distribution of the Gospel of John in Mexico in 1957, along with two friends, Walter Borchard and Dale Rhoton, calling the operation "Send the Light". He continued with other trips to Mexico during the summer holidays.

Verwer used the name "Send the Light" for a book distribution operation to India based in the United Kingdom, which would develop into the Send the Light Christian book distributor in the United Kingdom. In 2007, STL merged with the International Bible Society; in 2009 the new company changed its named to Biblica.

=== Operation Mobilisation ===
After graduation, George and Drena went to Spain. In 1964, while taking Bibles into the USSR, George was arrested and accused of being a spy, and was deported.

By 1961, he had returned to Spain, where he conceived of the work that became OM.

Operation Mobilization was officially launched in the middle of 1962.

In August 2003, Verwer handed over the international leadership of the work of OM to Peter Maiden, but remained associate international director for 15 further years. In particular, Verwer and his wife remained involved in Special Projects Ministries which involved full-time work.

In 2023, there were 6,500 OM staff and volunteers around the world. OM worked in 120 countries.

=== Ship ministry ===
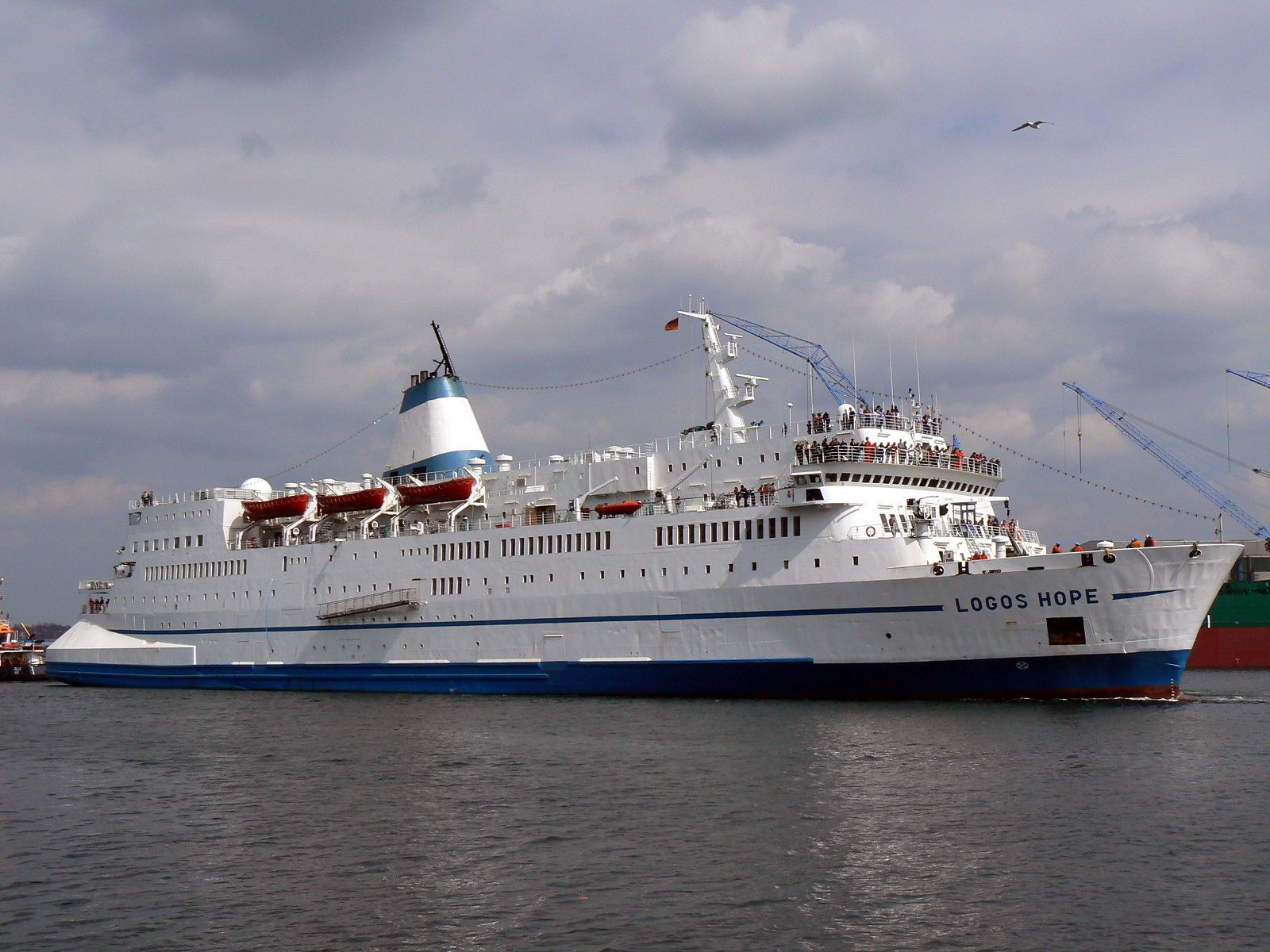
Logos Hope in Kiel

In 1970, under Verwer's leadership, OM purchased its first ship, the MV Logos. The vessel was retrofitted as a floating bookshop and ministry center, visiting international ports to distribute Christian literature and provide educational resources. This marked the beginning of OM's "ship ministry" which later expanded to include the MV Doulos (purchased in 1977), Logos II, and MV Logos Hope. Verwer viewed the ships as a tool to access nations that might otherwise be closed to traditional missionaries.

== Published works ==
The following are among the published works of Verwer;

=== Books ===
- The Fruit of the Spirit, Bangalore: O.M. Fellowship House, n.d.
- Extremism, Bombay: Gospel Literature Service, 1964.
- Pseudo Discipleship, Fort Washington: Christian Literature Crusade, 1969.
- Come! Live! Die! The Real Revolution, Carol Stream: Tyndale House Publishers, 1972.
- Hunger For Reality, Kansas City: Walterick Publishers, 1972.
- Literature Evangelism, Send the Light, 1977 ISBN 0-9630908-3-6.
- No Turning Back, Bromley: Send the Light, 1983, ISBN 1-85078-250-4.
- The George Verwer Collection, Milton Keynes: Authentic, 1989.
- The Revolution of Love, Authentic Lifestyle, 1989, ISBN 1-85078-045-5.

Originally published as "Revolution of Love and Balance".

- There is a 29th Chapter of Acts, published 2000
- There is Dynamite in Literature, Pilot Books, 2007, ISBN 978-0990617556.
- Out Of The Comfort Zone. Bethany House. 2001. ISBN 0-7642-2478-6.
- Drops From A Leaking Tap, Authentic, 2009, ISBN 978-81-7362-844-3.
- Messiology, Moody Publishers, 2016, ISBN 978-0-8024-1485-4.

Originally published as "More Drops: Mystery, Mercy and Messiology".

=== Audiobooks ===
- There Is A 29th Chapter To Acts, Oasis Audio, 2000, ISBN 1-886463-75-1.
- If You're Not Called To Stay Then Go!, 2000
- Lukewarm No More, 2000
- Straight From The Heart, 2000
- Failure, Restoration, Forgiveness: Confessions of a Weak Servant, 2000

== Personal life ==
Verwer married Drena Knecht and they had three children.

George often referred to himself as "God's Bungler", an allusion to Brother Andrew being called "God's Smuggler".

Verwer died on April 14, 2023, at the age of 84.

== Legacy ==
Verwer was known for his distinct approach to missiology, which he termed "messiology"—the belief that history and ministry are messy, but God works through fallible people and complex situations. He was easily recognizable for wearing a jacket printed with a map of the world, which he wore to encourage prayer for the nations.

By the time of his death in 2023, the organization he founded, Operation Mobilisation, had grown to over 5,000 staff working in more than 100 countries.
