= MV Doulos Hope =

Former cruise ship and floating bookfair

- MV Doulos Hope docked on Pelabuhan Bintang 99 Persada in Batam, Indonesia

History
- Name: 1989–1991: Lady Sarah; 1991–1994: Aurora II; 1994–2012: MegaStar Aries; 2012–2013: Genting World; 2013–2022: The Taipan; 2022–present: Doulos Hope
- Operator: Windsor Line (ordered 1989, bankrupt prior to delivery); New Frontier Cruise Line (1991–1994); Star Cruises (1994–2022); GBA Ships (2022–present)
- Port of registry: Valletta, Malta
- Builder: Flender Werft
- Yard number: 648
- Laid down: May 9, 1988
- Launched: April 7, 1989
- Completed: December 16, 1991
- Identification: Call sign: 9HA5843; IMO number: 8705278; MMSI number: 311000166
- Status: In service
- Notes: Greek "Doulos" means "Servant", "Doulos Hope" means "Servant of Hope"

General characteristics
- Tonnage: 3,370 GT
- Length: 85.2 m (279 ft 6 in)
- Beam: 16 m (52 ft 6 in)
- Draught: 3.8 m (12 ft 6 in)
- Decks: 5
- Propulsion: 2x Deutz-MWM TBD 604 B V16
- Capacity: 146

MV Doulos Hope is a former cruise ship now serving as a floating bookfair owned by the German faith-based charity Gute Bücher für Alle, an affiliate of Operation Mobilisation.

Currently named after the MV Doulos, the world's oldest active ocean-faring passenger ship until its retirement in December 2009, Doulos Hope was originally intended to sail as the Lady Sarah. For most of its career, it has served as a cruise ship under the names Aurora II, Megastar Aries, Genting World and The Taipan, predominantly for Hong Kong's now-defunct Star Cruises.

After a long completion of a refit in mid-2023, Doulos Hope is based in Southeast Asia and provides a floating bookfair in shallow-water ports to complement the much larger MV Logos Hope.

== History ==
The vessel was originally laid down on May 9, 1988 to designs first drawn up by Vikelas Architects of Athens, Greece, the Lady Sarah was built by Flender Werke of Lübeck, Germany alongside its sister ship the Lady Diana, nowadays known as the National Geographic Islander II.

Lady Sarah's original buyers, the Windsor Line, a privately owned, late-1980s startup targeting the North American yuppie market, could not meet their obligations on its completion in 1989. The ship was eventually sold to the Bahamas-based New Frontier Cruise Line instead, and in mid-December 1991 it was renamed MS Aurora II.

In July 1994, the ship was again sold to Hong Kong-based Star Cruises, where it would spend the remainder of its cruising career, and renamed MS Megastar Aries. After 2 decades later, while still remaining with Star Cruises, it was renamed first as MV Genting World in July 2012, and then as MV The Taipan in October 2013.

After Star Cruises' parent company, Genting Hong Kong, filed for bankruptcy in January 2022, the cruise line folded. In May of the same year, The Taipan was handed to OM Ships International, the ships ministry arm of Christian outreach organisation Operation Mobilisation. It was purchased to give the organization access to new ports, thanks to the ship's shallower draft compared to its other ships.

On May 25, 2022 Operation Mobilisation affiliate Gute Bücher für Alle accepted the ship in Penang, Malaysia, and it completed its sea trials on July 20. It then sailed to Singapore to continue a refurbishment which was concluded with its official relaunch on May 5, 2023.

Post-refurbishment, Doulos Hope is now registered in Valletta, Malta but based in Southeast Asia, where it stays in each port it visits for extended periods. As of April 2026, the ship had sailed over 24,000 nautical miles and visited over 25 different ports under its new name. It has welcomed almost 1,000,000 visitors and sold more than 1,000,000 books in the process.
