= Operation World =

Christian reference book and prayer guide by WEC International

- 1978 edition (publ. STL)
- Author: Patrick Johnstone
- Language: English
- Published: 1974 (Dorothea Mission)
- ISBN: 1-85078-007-2
- Website: http://www.operationworld.org

Operation World is a reference book and prayer guide, begun by Patrick Johnstone and continued by Jason Mandryk, both from WEC International, a Christian mission agency. The first edition was published by Dorothea Mission, later editions by Send the Light, publishing branch of Operation Mobilisation (OM). The latest edition of Operation World was published by Biblica, but is now distributed by InterVarsity Press (IVP) after IVP acquired the publishing arm of Biblica in late 2011. Operation World content has been made available online. It is aimed at informing Christians about every country in the world in order to encourage the church to pray for the world and to engage the world in Christian mission. This resource refers to itself as being written from a broadly evangelical Christian perspective.

== History and description ==
Operation World was on the list of the 50 most influential evangelical books in Christianity Today magazine. It is intended to mobilize the church to effective intercession and world mission and ultimately, to help the global Church fulfil the Great Commission.

Operation World has been published in seven editions. The most recent is the 2010 edition, released in October 2010, the first major update since the 2001 edition. The original edition was produced in 1974 by Patrick Johnstone, a missionary in South Africa, as a 32-page booklet of basic information about 30 countries. Operation World has been translated into several other languages: Spanish, French, Dutch, German, Portuguese, Russian, Korean, Indonesian, and simplified Chinese. Parts of Operation World have been translated into Arabic, Urdu, and Czech. The cumulative number of copies printed in all languages exceeds 2.5 million. In the missionary tradition of the Dorothea Mission and WEC International, the team behind the production of Operation World consists only of volunteers (i.e., no salaried staff).

The 1,000-plus page prayer resource is also organized as a calendar-year daily prayer guide. Each country's section begins with basic information on geography, demographics, population, literacy, economy, etc. Operation World then gives a breakdown of percentage of religions, Christian denominations, and missions groups, followed by points for prayer. These prayer points are directed toward the social, political, economic, cultural, and religious life of each nation, as well as life and activity of the existing Church in each country.

Thematically, Operation World begins with global issues and world missions, then narrows to cover the six continents before it settles into a country-by-country format, covering every nation and autonomous territory.

Data is gathered from sources including primary input from national Christian church leaders, missionaries, and researchers. A consultative process is used, eliciting input and response from nearly 2,000 such contacts in every part of the world. Information is also gathered from more than 300 periodicals and journals, articles from news agencies, datasets from international organizations and non-government organizations, websites of churches and ministries around the world, and more encyclopedic resources such as the World Christian Encyclopedia, the Ethnologue, and the Joshua Project. The Operation World database includes information on approximately 33,000 Christian denominations, 16 major religions, 1,200 missions agencies, and 16,000 fields of ministry.
