= GBA Ships e.V. =

German non-profit operating floating bookshops

GBA Ships e.V. (German: Gute Bücher für Alle, lit. "Good Books for All") is a German non-profit organisation based in Mosbach, Baden-Württemberg, that operates floating bookshops through a fleet of ships. It is closely affiliated with the Christian mission organisation Operation Mobilisation. Its vessels visit ports worldwide, offering affordable literature and community services such as educational programmes, cultural events, humanitarian aid and local development projects.

Since its founding in 1970, GBA Ships' vessels have sailed to ports in over 150 countries and welcomed tens of millions of visitors. As of 2026, the active fleet consists of two ships: the MV Logos Hope (in service 2009–present) MV Doulos Hope (in service 2023–present).

== History ==
=== Origins and MV Logos (1970–1988) ===
The GBA Ships ministry began in 1970 with the purchase of its first vessel. In October 1970, Operation Mobilisation acquired the 1949 Danish freighter Umanek, which was renamed Logos (Greek for "word"), to serve as a floating bookshop and outreach platform. MV Logos travelled the world for 17 years, visiting 255 unique ports in 108 countries and welcoming approximately 6.5 million visitors. In January 1988, Logos ran aground in the Beagle Channel off Tierra del Fuego, Chile, and was lost; all crew members were saved.

=== MV Doulos (1977–2009) ===
In 1977, GBA Ships acquired a second ship, built in 1914, which was renamed MV Doulos (Greek for "servant"). This vessel was recognised by Guinness World Records as the world's oldest active ocean-going passenger ship. MV Doulos carried out extensive outreach until 2009, visiting 295 unique ports across 108 countries and welcoming approximately 22 million visitors. After her certificates expired, Doulos was sold in 2010 and converted into a land-based hotel in Indonesia, now operating as Doulos Phos.

=== MV Logos II (1988–2008) ===
Following the loss of the original Logos, GBA Ships expanded the fleet in 1988 by purchasing a former car ferry (ex-Antonio Lazaro), which was renamed MV Logos II. Refitted for ministry work, Logos II served from 1988 to 2008, conducting outreach in over 187 unique ports across 86 countries and reaching approximately 11 million visitors. She was retired in 2008 and scrapped in Aliağa, Turkey.

=== MV Logos Hope (2009–present) ===
In 2004, GBA Ships purchased a 12,000-tonne roll-on/roll-off ferry (built 1973) and undertook a major conversion. This ship entered service in February 2009 as MV Logos Hope, becoming the largest vessel in the fleet at 12,519 gross tons. Logos Hope carries a book fair of over 5,000 titles and an international volunteer crew of approximately 300 volunteers from more than 60 nations.

As of April 2026, the ship has welcomed approximately 11.5 million visitors onboard.

=== MV Doulos Hope (2023–present) ===
In 2023, GBA Ships acquired the former cruise ship Megastar Aries (built 1991) and refitted it as MV Doulos Hope. After refurbishment in Singapore, she was relaunched on 7 May 2023 as GBA Ships' fifth vessel. At 85.5 metres in length and 3,370 GT, Doulos Hope was designed for shallow-water operations, enabling visits to smaller coastal ports in Southeast Asia and the Pacific. Like her larger sister ship, Doulos Hope hosts a floating book fair of around 2,000 titles and volunteer-run community projects on board.

== Current fleet ==
Active ships (as of 2026)
Vessel	Image	Type	Year built	Gross tonnage	In service	Region
MV Logos Hope	MV Logos Hope in port.	ROPAX (converted)	1973	12,519	2009–present	Global
MV Doulos Hope	MV Doulos Hope in port.	Cruise ship (converted)	1991	3,370	2023–present	Southeast Asia and Pacific

== Former fleet ==
Retired ships
Vessel	Image	Type	In service	Ports visited	Countries	Visitors	Fate
MV Logos		Freighter	1970–1988	255	108	6.5 million	Wrecked in Beagle Channel, January 1988
MV Doulos	MV Doulos in port.	Passenger ship	1977–2009	295	108	22 million	Sold 2010; converted to hotel Doulos Phos, Indonesia
MV Logos II	MV Logos II in port.	Car ferry (converted)	1988–2008	187	86	11 million	Scrapped 2008

== Operations ==
At each port, the ships open their gangways to the public for several weeks at a time. The onboard book fairs offer a broad range of literature — from children's books and fiction to educational, scientific, medical and vocational titles — at affordable prices. The ships regularly receive hundreds or thousands of visitors per day, and on average more than one million people board the fleet annually.

In addition to books, GBA Ships volunteers provide humanitarian and social outreach. Port-call programmes have included free vision screening and glasses distribution, water filter distribution, school renovations, environmental projects and children's activities. The organisation reports that thousands of tonnes of books have been donated to communities, and approximately 10,000 young people have participated in multi-year service terms on board.

Short-term volunteer programmes, known as STEP (Short Term Exposure Programme), allow participants to serve aboard the ships for periods of three to six months.

== Governance ==
GBA Ships e.V. is registered as a non-profit association (eingetragener Verein) under German law and is headquartered in Mosbach, Germany.

As of 2026, key leadership includes:

- CEO: Seelan Govender
- Director, MV Doulos Hope: Trizenia September
- Director, MV Logos Hope: Decio De Carvalho

== See also ==
- Operation Mobilisation
- MV Logos Hope
- MV Doulos Hope
- MV Doulos
- MV Logos II
