= Gustav Vasa (disambiguation) =

Gustav Vasa may refer to:

- Gustav I of Sweden, King of Sweden from 1523 to 1560
- MV Gustav Vasa, a ferry that operated between Sweden and Germany
- Gustavus Vassa (Olaudah Equiano), prominent African involved in the abolition of the slave trade
