= Christian Brethren in Egypt =

Denomination of Protestant Christianity in Egypt

- Classification: Protestant
- Orientation: Plymouth Brethren
- Polity: Connectional
- Region: Egypt
- Congregations: 283
- Members: 27,500 (including children)

The Christian Brethren are a denomination of Protestant Christianity in Egypt. They are related to the Exclusive Brethren tradition, even though the Christian Brethren label is internationally used more often by Open rather than Exclusive Brethren.

The Evangelical publication Operation World estimates that the Christian Brethren in Egypt had 27,500 adults and children attending 283 assemblies as of 2010.

== See also ==
- Christianity in Egypt
- Religion in Egypt
