= Paternoster Press =

British publishing house

- Parent company: Bootes Investments Ltd
- Founded: 1936
- Founder: Howard Mudditt
- Country of origin: United Kingdom
- Headquarters location: Milton Keynes
- Publication types: Books
- Official website: www.authenticmedia.co.uk

Paternoster Press is a British Christian publishing house which was founded by B. Howard Mudditt (1906–1992) in 1936. Mudditt was a Bank of England clerk who decided to move into publishing after seeing the many publishers based on London's Paternoster Row during his lunch hours; the firm was named after the street, and also alluded to the Lord's Prayer. The Irish Times described Paternoster as "a synonym for scholarly, evangelical Christian publications."

Mudditt led a Plymouth Brethren assembly in Walthamstow, a north-east suburb of London. Through this and other connections, Mudditt formed relationships with many religious scholars who then published in Paternoster, including F. F. Bruce, H.L. Ellison, George H. Lang, and I. H. Marshall. In its early decades, Paternoster collaborated with other publishers, including Inter-Varsity Fellowship (later Inter-Varsity Press) and the American firm Eerdmans.

Paternoster began with the publication of a children's magazine, Horizon and followed with another magazine, The Harvester, and a regular evangelical booklet, The Emergency Post. Also among Paternosters early works were a periodical, Science and Religion. In 1956, Inter-Varsity Fellowship sold the periodical, Evangelical Quarterly to Paternoster. Another significant publication was the New International Greek Text Commentary of the Bible, coedited by I. Howard Marshall, W. Ward Gasque, and Donald Hagner and published with Eerdmans. Later authors publishing in Paternoster include Tim Grass and Harold Rowdon. In the 1990s and 2000s, the publisher also presented a series of noted academic monograms: Paternoster Biblical Monographs, Paternoster Theological Monographs, Studies in Christian History and Thought, Studies in Evangelical History and Thought, and Studies in Baptist History and Thought. Paternoster Biblical Monographs, a series in the Evangelical tradition, broadly defined, won praise for the high caliber of its scholarship.

Paternoster relocated to Exeter in 1962. In 1975, Mudditt's son, Jeremy, became managing director and in 1976 was joined by Peter Cousins. In 1992 it was purchased by the Christian book distributor Send the Light as part of their Authentic Media division based in Milton Keynes, and moved to Carlisle, England.

Paternoster's imprints include Regnum (an academic list) and Rutherford House (a popular historical list); it also publishes books with specific imprints for organisations such as WEF (World Evangelisation Fellowship), YWAM (Youth with a Mission) and Spring Harvest.

In December 2009, as part of the failure of STL (Send the Light), Paternoster was sold to Australian-based company Koorong, which, prior to this, was primarily a retailer of Christian books, music and gifts. Subsequently, in 2015, Koorong became part of Bible Society Australia, but the change of ownership did not include Authentic Media Ltd, which in 2024 still exists and still uses the Paternoster imprint.

== Sources ==
- Grass, Tim. FF Bruce: A Life. Wm. B. Eerdmans Publishing, 2012.
- Neil Summerton, Jeremy Mudditt. Brethren Historical Review. (2010) Vol 6: pp. 122–125
- Ten Harmsel, Larry, and Reinder Van Til. An Eerdmans Century. Wm. B. Eerdmans Publishing, 2011.
- Paternoster Press Papers, Administrative History. ELGAR: Electronic Gateway to Archives at Rylands. The University of Manchester Library Collections, Manchester, UK.
