= Revised Version =

Late 19th-century British revision of the King James Version

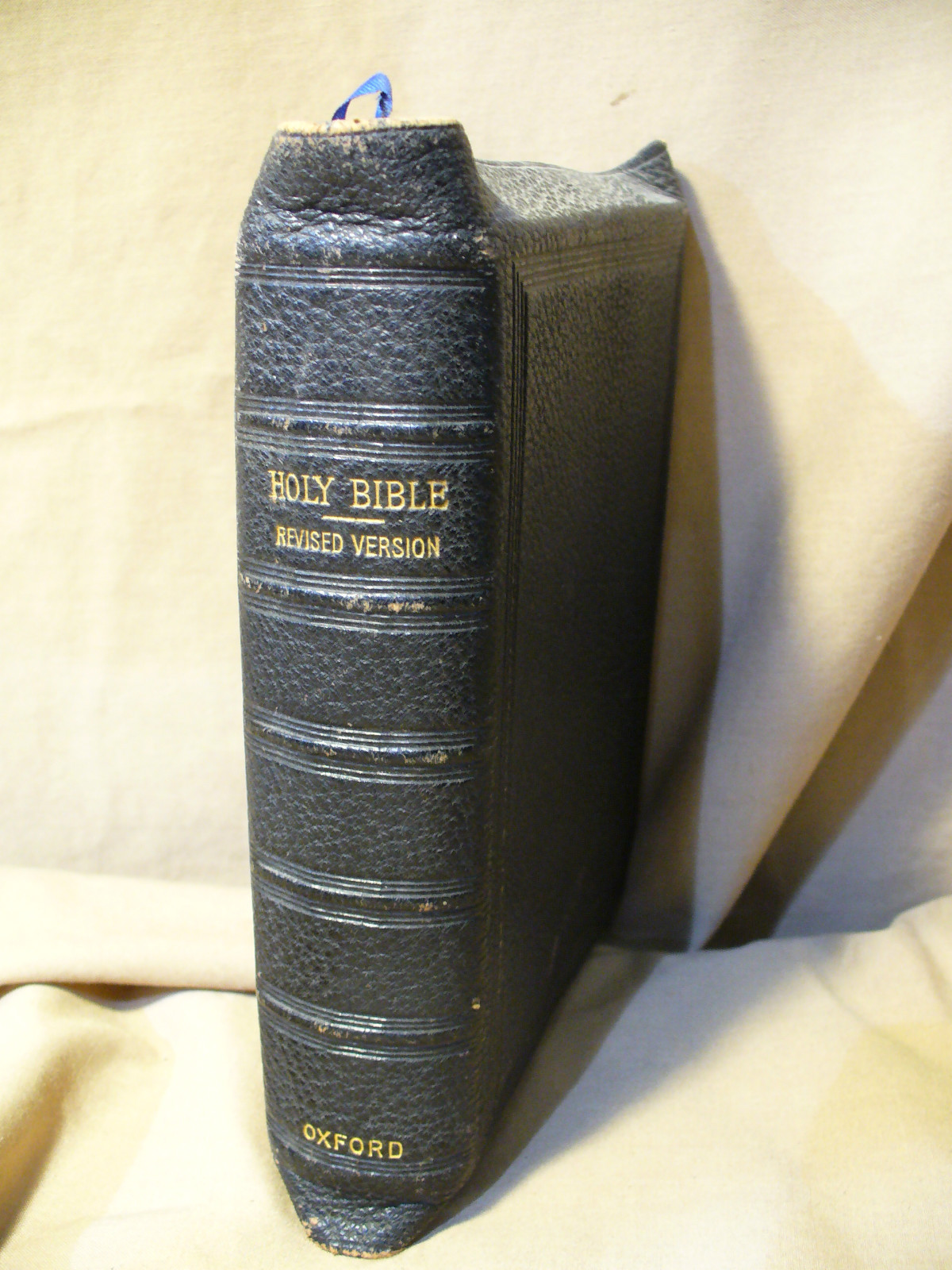
- Outer cover of Revised Version of the Bible, bound in leather with a full yapp. Published by Oxford in 1885.
- Full name: English Revised Version
- Abbreviation: RV (Note: The Revised Version can also be found abbreviated as the ERV (English Revised Version).)
- OT published: 1885
- NT published: 1881
- Complete Bible published: 1894
- Online as: Revised Version at Wikisource
- Derived from: 1881 Westcott and Hort New Testament Greek Critical Text (WH) which was based upon the Vaticanus and Sinaiticus manuscripts
- Translation type: Literal
- Copyright: Public domain
- Genesis 1:1–3 In the beginning God created the heaven and the earth. And the earth was waste and void; and darkness was upon the face of the deep: and the spirit of God moved upon the face of the waters. And God said, Let there be light: and there was light. John 3:16 For God so loved the world, that he gave his only begotten Son, that whosoever believeth on him should not perish, but have eternal life.

The Revised Version (RV) or English Revised Version (ERV) of the Bible is a late-19th-century British revision of the King James Version. It was the first (and remains the only) officially authorised and recognised revision of the King James Version in Great Britain. The work was entrusted to over 50 scholars from various denominations in Great Britain. American scholars were invited to co-operate, by correspondence. Its New Testament was published in 1881, its Old Testament in 1885, and its Apocrypha in 1894. The best known of the translation committee members were Brooke Foss Westcott and Fenton John Anthony Hort; their fiercest critics of that period were John William Burgon, George Washington Moon, and George Saintsbury.

== Features ==
The New Testament revision company was commissioned in 1870 by the convocation of Canterbury. Their stated aim was "to adapt King James' version to the present state of the English language without changing the idiom and vocabulary," and "to adapt it to the present standard of Biblical scholarship." To those ends, the Greek text that was used to translate the New Testament was believed by most to be of higher reliability than the Textus Receptus. The readings used by the revisers were compiled into a new edition of the Greek Testament by Edwin Palmer.

The Revised Version is significant in the history of English Bible translation for many reasons. At the time of the RV's publication, the nearly 300-year-old King James Version was the main Protestant English Bible in Victorian England. The Revised Version, therefore, is regarded as the forerunner of the entire modern translation tradition. It was also considered more accurate than the King James Version in a number of verses.

== New version ==
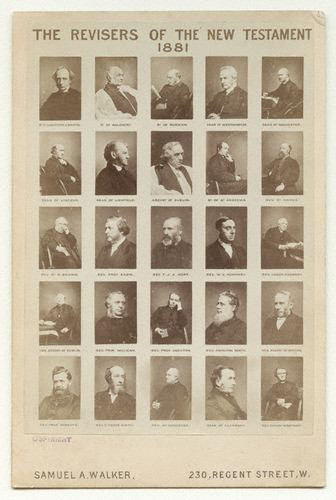
The Revised Version of the New Testament translators, 1881

The revisers were charged with introducing alterations only if they were deemed necessary to be more accurate and faithful to the original Greek and Hebrew texts. In the New Testament alone more than 30,000 changes were made, over 5,000 on the basis of what were considered better Greek manuscripts. The work was begun in 1879, with the entire work completed in 1885. (The RV Apocrypha came out in 1894.)

The 1885 Revised Version was the first post–King James Version modern English Bible to gain popular acceptance. It was used and quoted favorably by ministers, authors, and theologians in the late 1800s and throughout the 1900s, such as Andrew Murray, T. Austin-Sparks, Watchman Nee, H.L. Ellison, F.F. Bruce, and Clarence Larkin, in their works. Other enhancements introduced in the RV include arrangement of the text into paragraphs, formatting Old Testament poetry as indented poetic lines instead of prose, and the inclusion of marginal notes to alert the reader to variations in wording in ancient manuscripts. The Apocrypha in the Revised Version became the first printed edition in English to offer the complete text of Second Esdras, inasmuch as damage to one 9th-century manuscript had caused 70 verses to be omitted from previous editions and printed versions, including the King James Version.

In the United States, the Revised Version was adapted and revised as the "Revised Version, Standard American Edition" in 1901, now typically called the "American Standard Version". The American Standard Version of 1901 is very similar to the Revised Version of 1885 in wording and style, with minor variations. One example being the word "heavens" in the plural form in Genesis 1:1, in the American Standard Version, as in the Hebrew, whereas in the 1885 Revised Version it has the singular form "heaven" in that verse, as in the KJV. One other noticeable difference is the American Standard Version's much more frequent use of "Jehovah" to represent the Tetragrammaton in the Old Testament, rather than "the LORD" that is used more in the 1885 Revised Version.

The 1885 Revised Version and the 1901 American Revision are among the Bible versions authorized for use in services of the Episcopal Church and also of the Church of England.

== Later history ==
The American Standard Version was the basis for many revisions in the first hundred years after it was released. The RV itself has never been the basis for any revision except for the American Standard Version and the Apocrypha in the Revised Standard Version.

As the Revised Version is out of copyright worldwide, it is widely available online and in digital and e-reader formats (although it is significantly less popular than the KJV or the ASV in this manner). However, interest in the 1885 Revised Version has grown in recent years due to the internet, for general research and reference, and study of history of English Bible translations. It is sparsely available in printed published form today, with only Cambridge University Press publishing it in the form of a KJV/RV interlinear.

== See also ==
- The New Testament in the Original Greek

== Sources ==
- Marlowe, Michael D. "English Revised Version (1881-1895)". Retrieved March 22, 2004.
- Hall, Isaac H. (ed.) "History of the English Revised Version (1881)". Retrieved March 22, 2004.
- Palmer, Edwin. ΚΑΙΝΗ ΔΙΑΘΗΚΗ. The Greek Testament with the Readings Adopted by the Revisers of the Authorised Version. London: Simon Wallenberg Press, 2007. ISBN 1-84356-023-2
- Ryken, Leland (2002). The Word of God in English. Wheaton, IL: Crossway. ISBN 1-58134-464-3
- Burgon, John William (1883). The Revision Revised.
- Bible: Apocrypha, Revised Version. The Apocrypha, Translated out of the Greek and Latin Tongues, Being the Version Set forth A.D. 1611 Compared with the Most Ancient Authorities and Revised A.D. 1894, [as] Printed for the Universities of Oxford and Cambridge. Cambridge: At the University Press, 1896. ix, 175 p.
