= Outbreakband =

German Christian band

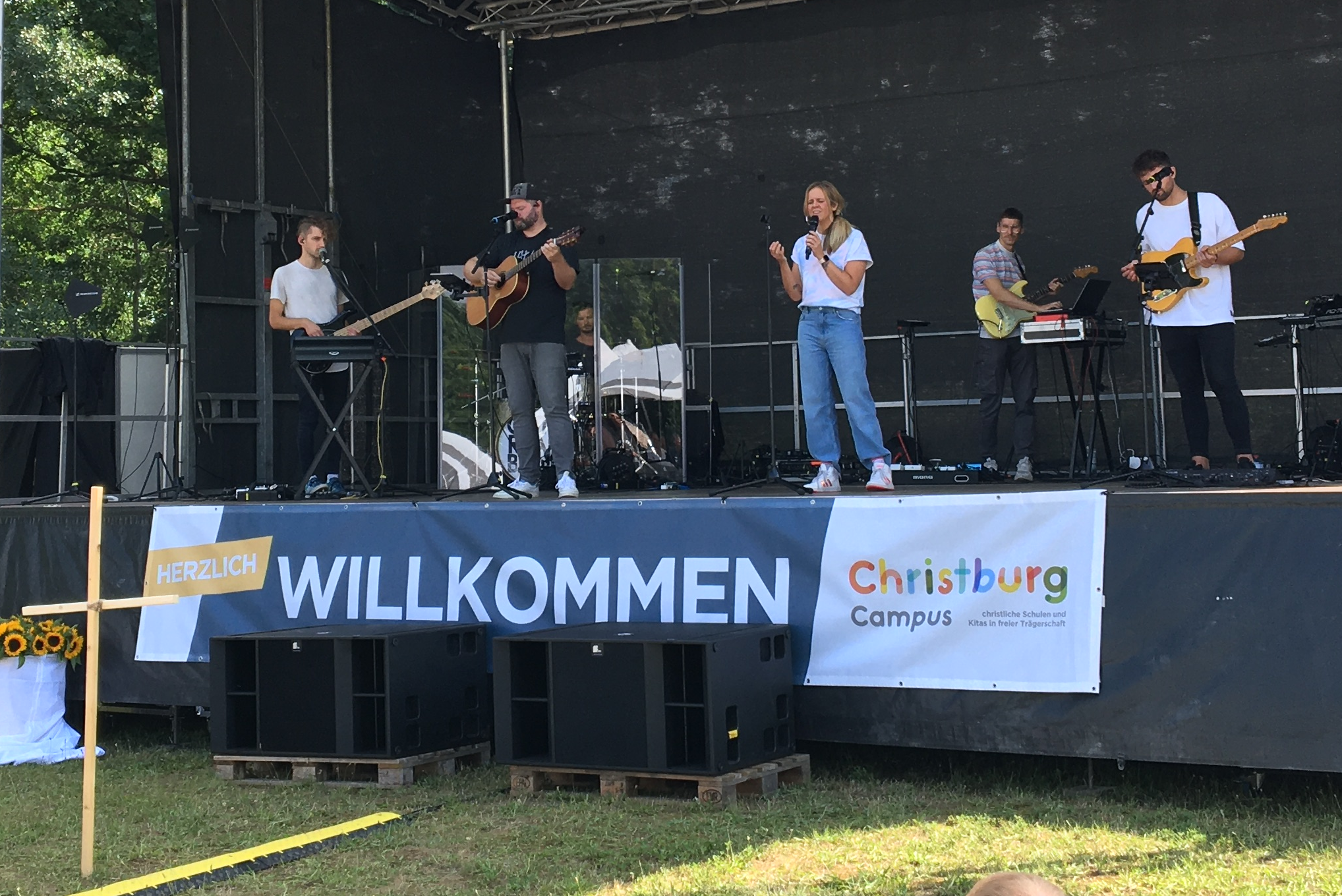
- Outbreakband performing in 2021 in Woltersdorf, Brandenburg

Background information
- Origin: Bad Gandersheim, Lower Saxony, Germany
- Genres: Contemporary Christian, worship
- Years active: 2007–present
- Members: Juri Friesen; Mia Friesen; Benni Schuhmacher; Pala Friesen; Stefan Schöpfle; Tobias Gamerdinger; Andy Polinski; Elina Wildemann; Markus Dinger; Niko Nilkens; Elijah Appel
- Website: outbreakband.de

Outbreakband is a Christian band from Germany. It was founded in 2007 as a result of Christian youth events at Glaubenszentrums Bad Gandersheim. The band was named after Outbreak, a feature during the Christian youth events of the center.

Outbreakband plays at Teenstreet Kongress events, festivals, worship nights and international faith events.

In 2013, the band won the David Award, the most widely respected pan-European Award of theEvangelical-oriented, modern Christian music scene, in the category "2012 Best Artist". Outbreakband's live album Das ist unser Gott reached place 23 in the German iTunes Albums Chart on 7 July 2014.

== Members ==
Main members usually include:

- Juri Friesen - vocals, acoustic guitar
- Mia Friesen - vocals
- Benni Schuhmacher - vocals
- Pala Friesen - guitar, vocals
- Stefan Schöpfle - synthesizer, loops, guitar
- Tobias Gamerdinger - keyboards
- Andy Polinski - guitar, vocals
- Elina Wildemann - vocals
- Markus Dinger - drums
- Niko Nilkens - bass
- Elijah Appel - vocals

== Discography ==
=== Albums ===
- 2008: In deinem Licht
- 2009: Alles Drin
- 2010: Alles Drin Remix
- 2011: Real Love
- 2016: Remixes & Makeovers
- 2017: Eins (Live) (Best of 10 Years – Live on Tour; Special guests: Florence Joy, Marco Michalzik, Flo Stielper, Mishka Mackova und Rowan Johnson)
- 2018: Atmosphäre (First studio album)
- 2018: Atmosphäre (Akustik Sessions)
- 2020: Atmosphäre (All the Remixes)
- 2022: Jesus (Second studio album; Special guests: Urban Life Worship, Amy Jakucs und Samuel Harfst)

in collaboration with Glaubenszentrum Live

- 2010: Die Liebe des Retters (Special guest: Anja Lehmann)
- 2012: Gott und König (Special guest: Thomas Enns)
- 2014: Das ist unser Gott (Live album)

=== EPs ===
- 2014: Louder than Before
- 2018: Atmosphäre Remix EP1
- 2019: Atmosphäre Remix EP2
- 2021: Zuerst geliebt
- 2021: Freue dich Welt (together with YADA-Worship and the O'Bros)
- 2023: Jesus Akustik

=== Singles ===
- 2013: "Frei sein Radio Edit" (from the album Gott und König)
- 2014: "Frei sein Remix" (from the album Gott und König)
- 2018: "Wie im Himmel"
- 2020: "Oh am Kreuz Akustik"
- 2020: "Ewigkeit"
- 2020: "Ewigkeit Akustik"
- 2020: "Solange ich leb"
- 2022: "Schöpfer aller Himmel"
- 2022: "Friede wie ein Strom"
- 2022: "Oase" (from the album Jesus)
- 2022: "Der Ausweg" (from the album Jesus)
- 2022: "Ich laufe zum Vater" (from the album Jesus)

== See also ==
Andrew & Alaina Mack
