= Smyril Line =

Faroese shipping company

- Type: A/S (Aktieselskab)
- Founded: 1983
- Headquarters: Tórshavn, Faroe Islands
- Area served: North Sea; North Atlantic; Norwegian Sea
- Services: Passenger transportation Freight transportation
- Operating income: ▲DKK 5.513 million (2009)
- Net income: ▲DKK 407,000 (2009)
- Total assets: ▲DKK 483,000 (2009)
- Total equity: ▲DKK 122 million (2011)
- Website: www.smyrilline.com

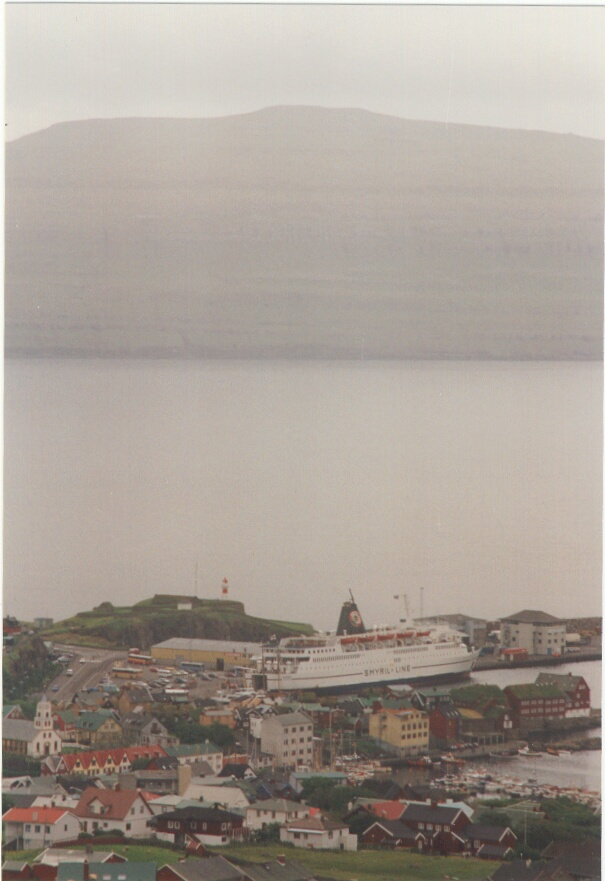
The old Norröna in Tórshavn Harbour, 1997

Smyril Line is a Faroese shipping company, linking the Faroe Islands with Denmark, Iceland, and the Netherlands. It previously also served Norway, the United Kingdom and Lithuania. Smyril is the Faroese word for the merlin.

== History ==
Since 1983, the company has operated a regular international passenger, car and freight service, currently using MS Norröna, a multi-purpose ferry built in Lübeck, Germany in 2003. The original vessel on the route was a Swedish-built ferry also named Norröna (built in 1973). The cost (about 100 million Euro) of building MS Norröna presented Smyril with financial difficulties, and public support had to guarantee the Faroese ship.

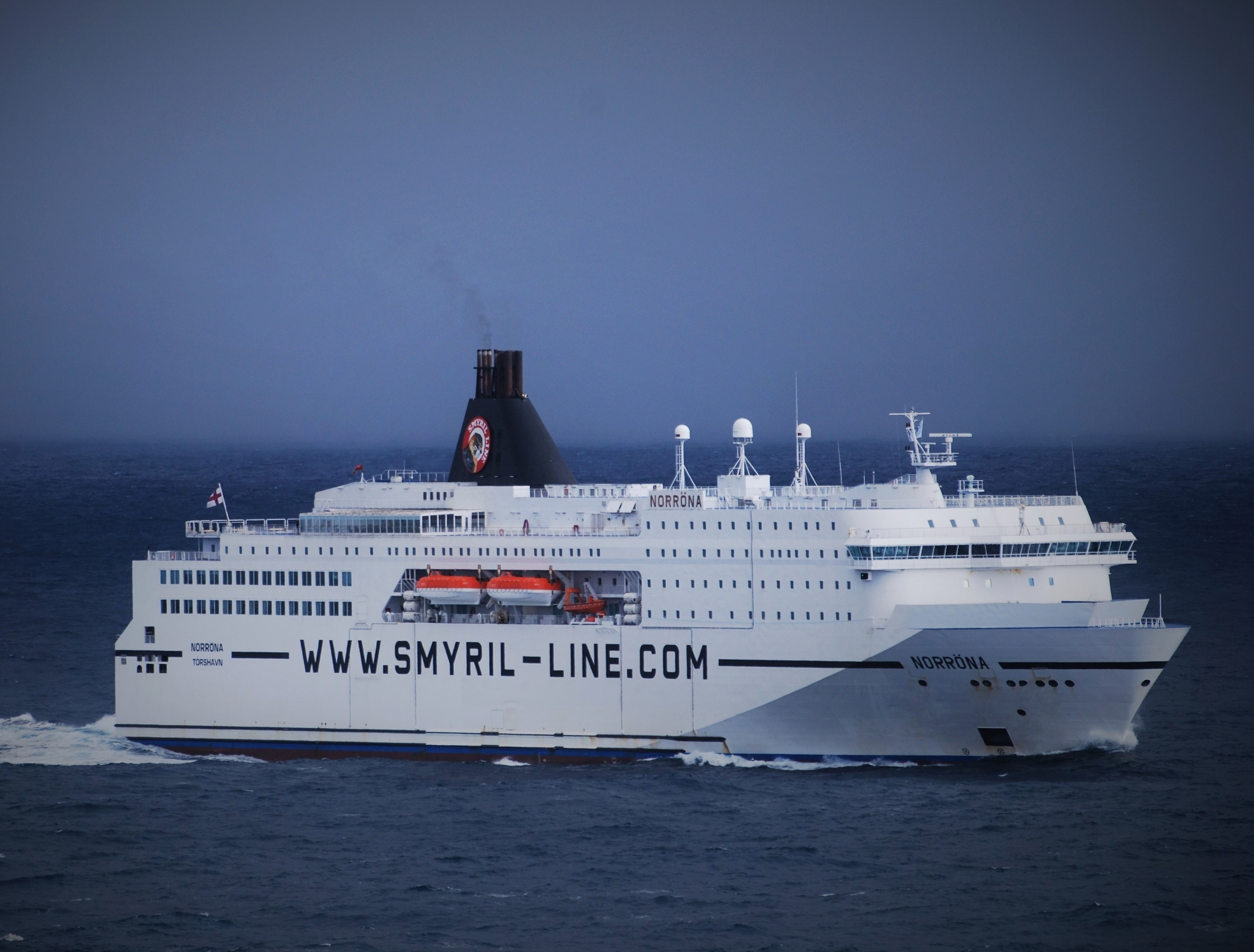
MS Norröna, March 2013

In 2024, the holding company was owned by P/F 12.11.11 (59.5%), Framtaksgrunnur Føroya (Faroese Development Trust, 6.3%), the Faroese Government (16.2%), and the rest of the shares (18%) were owned by several minor stakeholders.

In March 2026, CEO Jens Meinhard Rasmussen announced plans of replacing MS Norröna This comes after Smyril Line reported a record net income of 147 million kr. in 2024.

== Passenger operations ==
The service serves Tórshavn in the Faroe Islands, Seyðisfjörður in Iceland, and Hirtshals, in Denmark. As of 2022, the passenger service is halted between the Faroe Islands and Iceland during winter time, between mid-November and mid-March. The crossing between Hirtshals and Tórshavn takes 38 hours in winter and 30 hours during the summer schedule. The onwards journey to Seyðisfjörður takes another 15 hours. The service is weekly, except the ferry departs Hirtshals twice during summer weeks.

From April 1983 until the end of the summer 2007 timetable, Smyril Line served Lerwick in the Shetland Islands. Until the end of the summer 2008 timetable, Smyril Line also served Scrabster, Scotland, and Bergen, Norway.

Between 2009 and 2011 Smyril Line serviced Hanstholm (summer) and Esbjerg (winter) in Denmark.

In 2012, Smyril moved its Danish offices to Hirtshals.

== Cargo ==
Smyril Line Cargo operates a fleet of five Roll-on/roll-off vessels: Eystnes, Hvítanes, Akranes, Mykines, Glyvursnes, and Lista. Cargo is also shipped on the Norröna. Eystnes and Hvítanes connect Seyðisfjörður in Iceland with Klaipeda in Lithuania and from there through Hirtshals and Tórshavn, with Akranes connecting Rotterdam with Tórshavn and Þórlakshöfn ports.

The MV Mykines was added to the fleet in April 2017. Built at the Norwegian UMOE Sterkoder shipyard in 1996, it was previously operated as Auto Baltic for Bore shipping company in Finland. It measures 138.5 metres in length and 22.6 metres in width. As a RoRo ship it also takes unaccompanied cars as freight, providing an alternative to the Norröna. It sails from Rotterdam via Tórshavn (stopping there northbound only) to Þorlákshöfn in Iceland.

The Glyvursnes is the newest vessel, added in December 2023, taking over from the chartered Mistral. The vessel was bought from the Finnish company Bore Ltd., and was renamed from M/S Seagard to Glyvursnes. The vessel is 153.5 metres long and 20.6 metres wide, and it was built by the German shipyard J.J. Sietas in 1999. It sails between Tórshavn, Þórlakshöfn, and Hirtshals.

In 2024 February, Smyril Line signed a contract with the Chinese shipyard CIMC Raffles for two new cargo vessels. The delivery date is set for 2026, and both vessels will be 190 meters long and a capacity of 3300 lane meters. The vessels are designed by Knud E. Hansen. The vessels will be equipped with a battery system, connection to shore power, and will be able to run on methanol.

== See also ==
- Transport in the Faroe Islands
