= William MacDonald (Christian author) =

American theologian, author and teacher

- Born: January 7, 1917; Leominster, Massachusetts
- Died: December 25, 2007 (aged 90)
- Education: Tufts University; Harvard Business School
- Occupations: Author, Minister
- Relatives: Ian M (Morrison) MacDonald (brother); Thomas MacDonald (nephew); Susi MacDonald (niece)

William MacDonald (January 7, 1917 – December 25, 2007) was an American theologian and teacher. He was President of Emmaus Bible College, Plymouth Brethren and a prolific author of over 84 published books.

== Biography ==
=== Early life and education ===
William (Bill) MacDonald was born on January 7, 1917, in Leominster, Massachusetts.

When he was six years old, his family moved to Stornoway, Scotland, and later moved back to Massachusetts. He received a Bachelor of Arts degree from Tufts College in 1938 and an MBA from Harvard Business School in 1940.

=== Career ===
After graduation, he was employed as an investment analyst at the First National Bank of Boston (now known as BankBoston) until 1942. During 1942, MacDonald enlisted in the Navy, where he served until 1946. He then served on the faculty of Emmaus Bible School until 1965, becoming President in 1959. He contributed to the Emmaus Correspondence School through his writings.

=== President of Emmaus Bible College (1959-1965) ===
While President of Emmaus Bible College, MacDonald made lasting contributions. Among his accomplishments are numbered:

1. Leading Emmaus Bible College to purchase the 156 N. Oak Park facility
2. Leading the merging of the Toronto and Chicago schools in Oak Park
3. Leading the purchase of the Groveland building in 1960
4. Bringing the "Emmaus student enrollment above 100 in the resident school and above 60 in the evening school."

=== Post-Presidency Career ===
After 1965, he led a Bible-teaching ministry in the United States, Europe, and Asia until 1972. In 1973 he served on the faculty of the Discipleship Intern Training Program, based in San Leandro, California, until 1996. After 1996, MacDonald moved back to the Bible-teaching ministry, until his death on December 25, 2007.

== Works ==
- The Good News Bible Correspondence Course (The Moody Bible Institute, 1954)
- Hebrews: From Shadow to Substance (The Moody Bible Institute, 1957)
- Believer's Bible Commentary (1989)
- True Discipleship (1975)
- The Epistle to the Hebrews: From Ritual to Reality
- 1 Peter: Faith Tested, Future Triumphant; A Commentary
- Ephesians: The Mystery of the Church; A Commentary
- Worlds Apart (Gospel Folio Press, 1993)
- The Wonders of God (Gospel Folio Press, 1996)
- Once in Christ: In Christ Forever (Gospel Folio Press, 1997)
- Our God Is Wonderful (Gospel Folio Press, 1999)
- Be Holy: The Forgotten Command (John Ritchie Publications, 1999)
- Here's the Difference: Bringing Important Biblical Distinctions Into Focus (Gospel Folio Press, 1999)
- Joseph Makes Me Think of Jesus (Gospel Folio Press, 2000)
- Living Above the Average (Gospel Folio Press, 2001)
- Now THAT is Amazing Grace (Gospel Folio Press, 2001)
- God Still Speaks (Gospel Folio Press, 2002)
- True Discipleship (Gospel Folio Press)
- The Disciple's Manual (Gospel Folio Press)
- One Day at a Time (Gospel Folio Press)
- My Heart, My Life, My All (Gospel Folio Press)
