= Thomas Newberry =

English Bible scholar and writer

Thomas Newberry (1811 – 16 January 1901) was an English Bible scholar and writer, best known for his interlinear Englishman's Bible first published in 1883 by Hodder and Stoughton, London. This work compared the King James Version of the Bible with the Masoretic Text of the Hebrew Bible in Biblical Hebrew and the Codex Sinaiticus manuscript of the New Testament in Koine Greek.

== Life ==
Newberry was born into a Christian household in 1811 and little is known about his upbringing. Reportedly, through the witness of his older sister and mother, both believers, he was born again at a young age. He ultimately came into fellowship with other Christians at the Plymouth Brethren assembly on Meadow Street, Weston-super-Mare, Somerset, UK. He based his decision to join with the Brethren based on his studies of Scripture, and from 1840 had devoted himself to studying the Bible, not just in English but in its original languages of Hebrew and Greek. He found himself unable to agree with many of the practices and ordinances of the established churches of the day.

After years of serious study, Newberry published The Englishman's Bible (1886), his most famous legacy. He taught alongside Robert Chapman, Henry Dyer and George Muller, and contributed Bible teaching articles to The Witness and other Christian magazines, as well as conducting an extensive correspondence with Bible students across the world. Frederick Tatford tells us that Newberry was 'used by God in establishing an assembly in Nice, France, among many Italian-speaking residents in 1895'.

== Works ==
=== The Englishman's Bible ===
In 1863, Newberry was given a copy of Tischendorf's transcription of the New Testament according to the Codex Sinaiticus, in which he made copious handwritten notes, and two years later commenced work on The Englishman's Study Bible, later more frequently known as the Newberry Study Bible. The finished work, with its unique use of signs and symbols to aid understanding of the tenses, and alternative translations, was much admired by the likes of William Kelly, FF Bruce and CH Raven.

=== Selected other works ===
- Notes on the Temple
- Notes on the Tabernacle
- Outlines of the Revelation
- Solar Light as Illustrating Trinity in Unity
- The Expected One
- The Parables of Our Lord
- The Perfections and Excellencies of Scripture
- The Song of Solomon
- The Temples of Solomon and Ezekiel
- Types of the Levitical Offerings
- The Perfections and Excellencies of Scripture

== Selected Quotations ==
"Thomas Newberry, the editor of The Newberry Study Bible, was born in 1811 and died in 1901. For most of his life he belonged to the Open wing of the Brethren movement. He resided for many years at Weston-super-Mare, England, and from there he exercised a long and fruitful expository ministry, both oral and written. He was a careful student of the Bible in Hebrew and Greek. Evidence of his minute attention to the sacred text lies before me as I write, in a beautiful copy of Tischendorf's transcription of the New Testament according to the Codex Sinaiticus, presented to him by friends in London in 1863, which is annotated throughout in his neat handwriting. It was after twenty-five years devoted to such study that he conceived the plan of putting its fruits at the disposal of his fellow-Christians in The Newberry Study Bible." - F.F. Bruce

"As the result of a careful examination of the entire Scriptures in the originals, noticing and marking where necessary every variation of tense, preposition, and the signification of words, the impression left upon my mind is this: not the difficulty of believing the entire inspiration of the Bible, but the impossibility of doubting it....The godliness of the translators, their reverence, the superiority of their scholarship, and the manifest assistance and control afforded to them by the Holy Spirit in their work, is such that the ordinary reader can rely upon the whole as the Word of God." - Thomas Newberry

"Newberry had no axe to grind. He was a careful and completely unpretentious student of Hebrew and Greek texts, whose one aim was to make the fruit of his study available as far as possible to Bible students whose only language was English. His procedure tended to make the Biblical text self-explanatory as far as possible; he had no thought of imposing on it an interpretive scheme of his own."- F.F. Bruce

"This slender quarto consists of eleven chapters, meant to illustrate and explain the value of his Englishman's Hebrew O.T., and Greek N.T., as far as can be for those who do not know the original tongues. The reader will find in the work not a few profitable hints conveyed in a clear and compact manner. Mr. N. is not a little attached to the Text. Rec. and the A.V., and indisposed to go with the Revisers in their admiration of their own work." - William Kelly on The Englishman's Bible
