= MV Logos II =

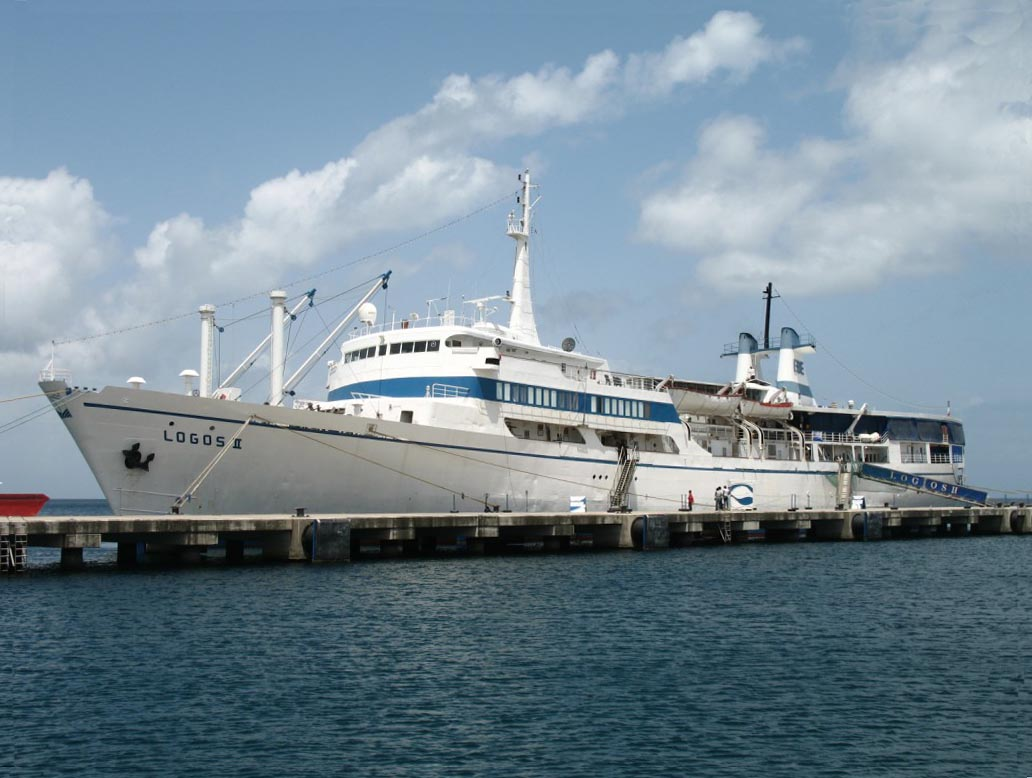

History
- Name: 1968-1988: Antonio Lazaro; 1988-1988: Argo; 1988-2008: Logos II
- Operator: 1968-1988: Trasmediterránea; 1988-1988: Attika Shipping; 1988-2008: GBA ships
- Port of registry: 1968-1988: Valencia, Spain; 1988-2008: Valletta, Malta
- Builder: Union Naval Levante
- Launched: 13 January 1968
- Identification: IMO number: 6806834
- Fate: Scrapped 2008

General characteristics
- Tonnage: 4,804 Gross tons
- Length: 109.55 m (359 ft 5 in)
- Beam: 16.30 m (53 ft 6 in)
- Draught: 5.12 m (16 ft 10 in)
- Installed power: 2 x B&W 1035 VBF 62 diesel engines
- Propulsion: 2 x Controllable pitch propellers

The MV Logos II was a ship built in Spain, 1968, which was purchased in 1989 by Educational Book Exhibits Ltd., a private, non-profit, charitable organisation registered in the UK. Logos II was operated on behalf of EBE by GBA Ships, a second private, non-profit, charitable organisation registered in Germany. She entered service in 1990 and was active until October 2008 when she was sold. The work of Logos II is now being carried on by a replacement vessel Logos Hope.

== History ==
Logos II’s original name was Antonio Lazaro. She was built by Union Naval Levante SA of Valencia, Spain in 1968, and owned by Compañía Trasmediterránea. The ship was designed to operate a ferry service to Morocco, carrying 400 berthed and 200 deck class passengers. She also had a cargo hold forward and side doors for the loading of vehicles. She later sailed between Spain and Spanish territories in North Africa.

Educational Book Exhibits Ltd. purchased the ship on 21 October 1988, and renamed her Logos II. Extensive renovations and upgrades were carried out to prepare the ship for future service. Logos II welcomed more than 10 million visitors on board with stops in 350 ports of call in 81 countries. The ship was sold in October 2008, and the work is carried on by her replacement since February 19, 2009, MV Logos Hope. The last port of call for Logos II was Port of Spain, Trinidad and Tobago.

== See also ==
- Operation Mobilisation
- MV Doulos
- MV Logos Hope
