= William Gibson Sloan =

British evangelist to the Faroes and Shetland (1838–1914)

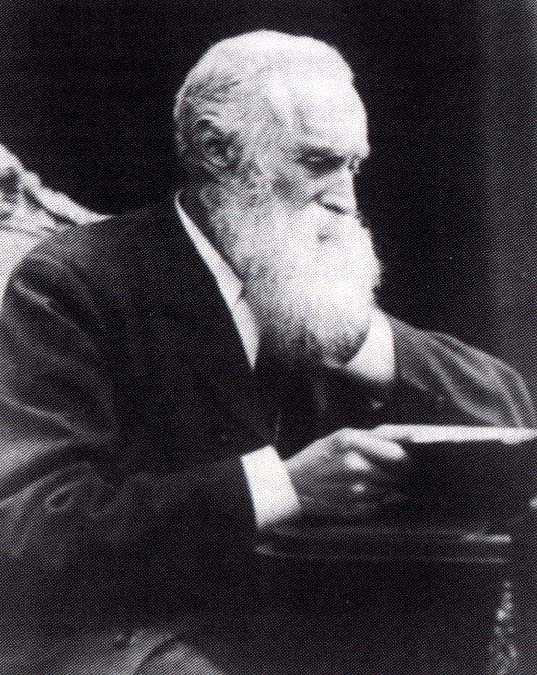
William Gibson Sloan, 73 years of age

William Gibson Sloan (4 September 1838 in Dalry, North Ayrshire, Scotland – 4 September 1914 in Tórshavn, Faroe Islands) was a Plymouth Brethren evangelist to the Faroe Islands and Shetland.

== Life ==
William Gibson Sloan was born to Nathanael and Elisabeth Sloane (Sloan) of Bridgend, Dalry.

Experiencing an evangelical conversion at age 23, Sloan became a Colporteur for the Religious Tract and Book Society of Scotland. The society sent Sloan to work in Shetland and Orkney. While in Shetland, Sloan came into contact with local Plymouth Brethren, and began to discuss and reconsider theological matters such as Believer's baptism and communion. Although a member of the Church of Scotland, Sloan became convinced that the baptism of a believer by immersion was the only correct form of baptism, and was thus baptised himself in 1864 at a local Baptist Church in Shetland. Sloan left the Church of Scotland at that point, but did not formally identify himself as a Baptist, as he no longer wished to be a member of a particular denomination. Subsequently, Sloan began to 'break bread' as a founding member of the first Brethren Assembly in Shetland.

Sloan had heard about the Faroe Islands from Shetland fishermen, and felt called to travel to the islands as an evangelist. He resolved to follow this calling in May 1865, and departed for the Faroes on a fishing ship in June of that year. His first visit to the islands lasted for seven weeks. Between 1865 and 1879, Sloan worked as a travelling evangelist in Scotland, Shetland, Orkney, Norway, and Iceland, and spent the summer months in the Faroes. In 1879 he settled in the Faroes permanently.

For many years, Sloan's work in the Faroes progressed slowly, but eventually a few people started gathering in "Ebenezer Hall" also known as "Sloan's Hall", which was built in Tórshavn in 1879. The first baptisms by immersion were held in 1880, which caused some controversy at the time. As the number of congregants increased, a new and bigger "Ebenezer" was built in 1905. Other Brethren congregations were also established in the islands as a result of the work of Sloan and those who supported him.

Sloan became an admired and respected figure in the islands, eventually earning the moniker 'Gamli Sloan' ('Old Sloan'). Sloan died on his 76th birthday, 4 September 1914, in his home in Tórshavn. Sloan's house is now owned by the local government of Tórshavn, and managed by the Brethren congregation at Ebenezer. The house is still used for a number of events and activities.

The Faroese Brethren community experienced rapid growth in the early 20th Century. Approximately 13% of the population in the Faroe Islands now belong to local Brethren congregations.

== Family ==
On 11 October 1881 William Sloan married Elsebeth (Elspa) Isaksen í Geil from Tórshavn, at the Open Brethren Assembly in Motherwell, near Glasgow. William and Elspa Sloan had six children: Poul (born 1882), Elisabeth (Betty) (born 1887), Archibald (born 1890), Cathrine (born 1892), Anna Elisabeth (born 1895) and Andrew (born 1896). Elspa remained a widow after William Sloan's death until her death on 4 June 1939. Their youngest son, Andrew, followed in his father's footsteps and became an evangelist in the Faroe Islands.

== Literature ==
- Fred Kelling: Fisherman of Faroe – William Gibson Sloan, Leirkerið Publications, Gøta, Faroe Islands 1993
- Tórður Jóansson: Brethren in the Faroes - An Evangelical movement, its remarkable growth and lasting impact in a remote island community, Tórshavn 2012, ISBN 978-99918-65-46-1
- In Faroese: Sigurd Berghamar: -men Gud gav vøkst – um William Sloan og fyrstu samkomurnar, Forlagið Afturljóð, Tórshavn 1992
