= Send the Light =

Former British Christian book distributor

Send The Light
- Founded: 1957
- Founder: George Verwer
- Dissolved: Entered into Administration December 2009 and moved into Liquidation December 2010.
- Type: Registered as a British charity and a private company, limited by guarantee with no share capital
- Purpose: Advancement of education and religion
- Location: Carlisle, UK
- Region served: UK and elsewhere
- Method: Advancing the Christian Faith through the creation, distribution and retailing of Christian resources
- Key people: Michael Fitch (Chairman); Keith Danby (CEO); David Ryan (Secretary)
- Revenue: £35.8m (2009)
- Employees: 390 (2009)

Send the Light (STL) was a British Christian book distributor which had absorbed other Christian publishers and bookshops, and eventually merged with the International Bible Society to become one of the largest non-profit book distributors in the world under the title of IBS-STL Global, now known as Biblica.

== Early history ==
The name “Send the Light” first appeared in 1957 as a Christian literature evangelism ministry sending copies of the Gospel of John from Chicago to Mexico, under the direction of George Verwer, then a student at Moody Bible Institute. Verwer later moved to Bolton in the UK, where he established Operation Mobilisation (OM), which today distributes Christian literature in many countries around the world. Verwer decided to keep the name “Send the Light” for one particular aspect of OM, exporting Christian books to India. As STL, this developed into a general distributor of Christian books, and relocated to Bromley in Kent.

== Rise to prominence ==
In January 1986, Keith Danby was made chief executive of STL. Danby had a background in finance and by introducing stock catalogues, a free telephone number and next-day deliveries he increased turnover by 52% in one year. In 1988 he set up an independent board for STL which separated it from the governance of OM, and the following year the company relocated to Carlisle. In the 1990s STL began to expand its interests.

In 1992 an old Christian publisher, Paternoster Press, was acquired, and the first Wesley Owen Books and Music shop was opened in Bromley. The intention was to create a “Christian Waterstone's” which would be more professional than many of the Christian bookshops then found in the UK. The following year STL took over the Church of Scotland shops, the Evangelical Christian Literature (ECL) shops, and the Scripture Union shops. Danby explained that STL’s aim was to show “excellence combined with Christian compassion”.

In 1993 OM released STL to operate as a separate organisation to allow it to concentrate on the publishing and distribution of Christian literature..

In 2001 STL acquired Word UK, which produced books, music and videos. STL became the largest Christian organisation dealing with books in the UK. STL remained a charity, and in 2001 was listed as the 74th largest one in the UK. STL was also the main gateway for several of the biggest American Christian publishers, including Tyndale House, Zondervan, Moody Books, Baker Books, and Multnomah.

== Entering the American market ==
In 2003 STL furthered its push into the US market by acquiring OM_Literature. It also purchased the distributor FaithWorks, and in 2005 it bought its largest acquisition, Appalachian Distributors Inc. The CEO of STL USA is David Passman.

== Merger with the International Bible Society ==
In January 2007, Send the Light merged with the International Bible Society providing a truly global reach. The result was the creation of one of the largest non-profit book distributors in the world. The STL leaders set a target for when the merger went through on 1 March 2007 of having “a Bible for everyone on Earth”. The new organisation became known as "IBS-STL Global" and the UK operation as IBS-STL (UK) and registered as a charity and a company limited by guarantee.

== Financial difficulties, administration ==
The last set of financial statements by IBS-STL UK for the year ended 28 February 2009, and approved by the Board on 6 July 2009, refer to having had a "challenging year for the Charity". This had been characterised by "a combination of weak economic conditions in the UK, and a difficult move to the new SAP IT system", leading to a "significant operational loss" for that year. The report highlighted the financial risks which the Charity was exposed to, particularly those associated with loans, leases, and trade debtors and creditors. There was however no indication that these risks would be so severe as to result in the collapse of the business just four months later.

On 16 November 2009 IBS-STL UK announced that due to "a succession of financial problems, in particular the failed implementation of a new SAP computer system in October 2008, the effects of which were exacerbated by the economic downturn" a decision had been taken to "exit the business" at which point a buyer was sought. However, no sale arrangement could be made and IBS STL (UK) formally entered into Administration on 18 December 2009. Two partners from Baker Tilly Restructuring and Recovery LLP, Manchester, were appointed by the High Court as joint administrators. The ensuing process of administration resulted in the following outcome for the principal trading activities of IBS-STL (UK) :-

=== STL Distribution ===
In December 2009 John Ritchie Ltd of Kilmarnock, Scotland, finalised a deal with the Administrators to become the owners of the Christian book distribution and wholesaler business, STL Distribution Ltd. John Ritchie Ltd stated their intention to retain Carlisle as the major base of operation for this business. Keith Danby was replaced by Ken Munro as CEO.

=== Wesley Owen ===
At the time the business collapsed, IBS STL (UK) were operating a chain of 41 retail units (bookshops) under the 'Wesley Owen' brand name, situated in various towns and cities throughout the UK. In the months following, a majority of these shops were taken over by other Christian-based companies or charitable trusts leaving only a small number unable to continue trading after no buyers were found.

- Koorong Books of Sydney, Australia, bought the Wesley Owen brand and domain names and took over 8 bookshops at Bath, Birmingham, Bristol, Bromley, Coleraine, Derby, Glasgow and York.
- CLC International of Alresford, Hampshire, took over 6 shops at Bolton, Cambridge, Coventry, Guildford, Kingston upon Thames and Stockport.
- Nationwide Christian Trust of Essex took over 19 shops and rebranded them under the trading name Living Oasis. These were at Aberdeen, Bedford, Belfast, Cheltenham, Chester, Edinburgh, Harrogate, Harrow, Leeds, Liverpool, Manchester, Nottingham, South Woodford, Sutton, Watford, Weston-super-Mare and Worthing.
- The three bookshops at Falkirk, Walsall and Woking were taken over by independent traders.
- No buyers were found for the shops at Brighton, Carlisle, Dundee and Macclesfield.

=== Authentic Book Publishing ===
Koorong, in addition to purchasing the Wesley Owen brand (see above), also purchased all of the Authentic and Paternoster intellectual property and author contracts and with plans to continue the book publishing business from the existing Authentic base in the Milton Keynes area.

=== Authentic Music ===
Kingsway Communications of Eastbourne, East Sussex, bought the music part of the Authentic Media business based in Milton Keynes.

== Liquidation ==
On 1 December 2010, the company was moved from administration and into creditors' voluntary liquidation. The final progress report from the Administrators showed that the largest of the Secured Creditors, Royal Bank of Scotland, had been repaid £3.278m from the realisation of their legal charges over one freehold and two long leasehold sites, leaving a shortfall of £1.2m owing. Scripture Union had recovered £311k from an arrangement to receive proceeds from debtor realisations, which left 14% outstanding on the amount owing. Preferential claims comprising outstanding holiday pay to employees were settled in full. Unsecured Creditor claims aggregating to over £9.5m had not been paid at all at the end of the administration and would be addressed during liquidation. With the administrator fees and costs totalling over £500k, the funds remaining from the realised assets amounted to £2.15m. The final dividend for distribution to unsecured creditors was just over £35,000.

== See also ==
- List of book distributors
