= MS Norröna =

Ferry serving the Faroe Islands

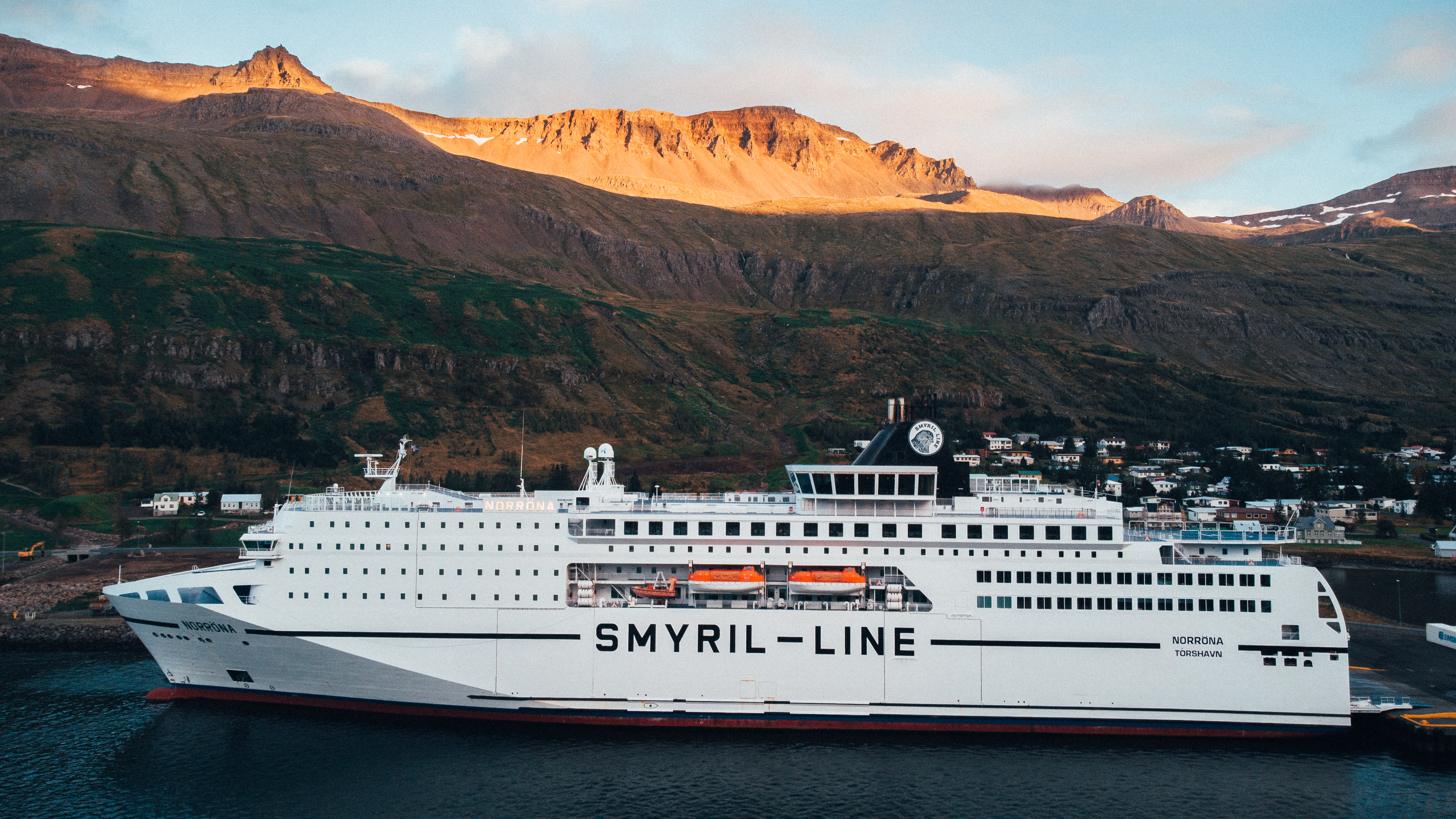
- Norröna in 2021

History
- Name: Norröna
- Owner: Smyril Line
- Operator: Smyril Line
- Port of registry: Tórshavn, Faroe Islands
- Ordered: 2001
- Builder: Flender Werke, Lübeck, Germany
- Yard number: 694
- Laid down: 7 January 2002
- Launched: 24 August 2002
- Christened: 5 April 2003
- Completed: April 2003
- Acquired: 5 April 2003
- In service: 10 April 2003
- Identification: IMO number: 9227390; MMSI number: 231200000; Callsign: OZ2040
- Status: In service

General characteristics
- Class & type: Ropax
- Tonnage: 35,966 GT
- Length: 164 m (538 ft 1 in)
- Beam: 30 m (98 ft 5 in)
- Height: 50.3 m (165 ft 0 in)
- Draft: 6 m (19 ft 8 in)
- Decks: 10
- Ramps: 1 (stern)
- Ice class: Ice Class 1A
- Propulsion: four Wärtsilä NSD ZA40S, two controllable pitch propellers
- Speed: 21 knots (39 km/h; 24 mph)
- Capacity: 1,500 passengers and 800 cars
- Crew: 120

Norröna is the Faroes' largest ferry. It sails between Hirtshals, Denmark and Tórshavn, the Faroe Islands, as well as Seyðisfjörður, Iceland.

== History ==
=== Norröna (1973) ===
The original Norröna was built in 1973 at Nobiskrug in Rendsburg, Germany, as Gustav Wasa. From 1984, she was renamed Norröna and operated by Smyril Line on routes between Denmark, the Faroe Islands, Iceland, and Norway, and in some years also to Shetland. The ship was eventually replaced by a new Norröna in 2003. The old ship is still in service under the Maltese flag as a missionary ship, operating under the name Logos Hope.

=== Norröna (2003) ===
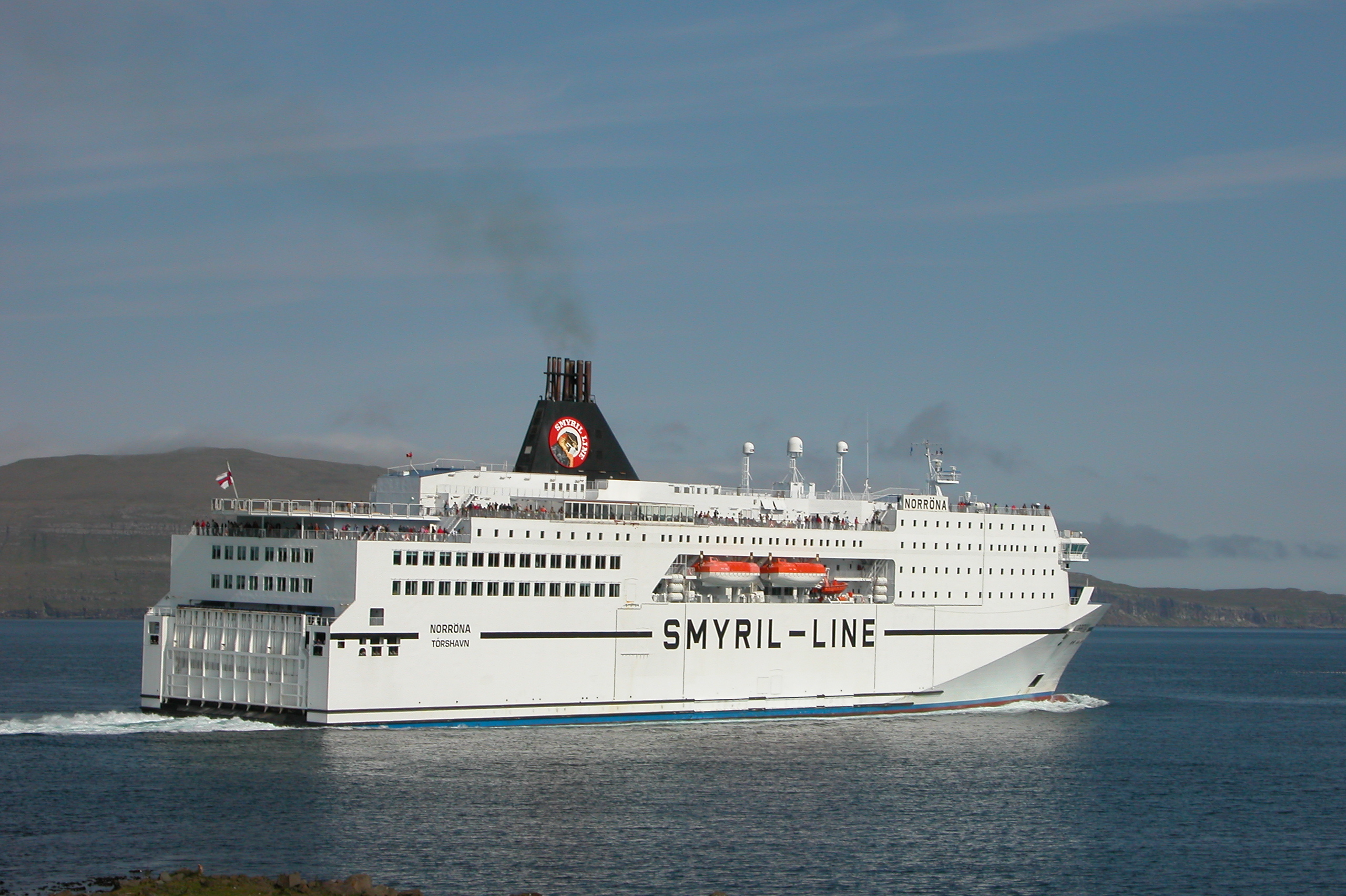
Norröna in 2007

The new Norröna is a modern cruiseferry, built in Lübeck, Germany, with her maiden voyage in April 2003. She has a total LOA (length overall) of 165 metres (541 ft 4 in), and a width of 30 metres (98 ft 5 in); 34.23 m (112 ft 4 in) with lifeboats. She has a total of 318 passenger cabins and 72 crew cabins, which accommodates the space of approximately 1,482 passengers and 118 crew members. She has a total of 1,830 metres (6,000 ft) of trailer lane, with space for 800 cars or 130 cargo trailers. Her cruising speed is approximately 21 knots (39 km/h; 24 mph). Norröna is the only way to take personal cars to the Faroe Islands and Iceland from Denmark or from the Faroe Islands and Iceland to Denmark.

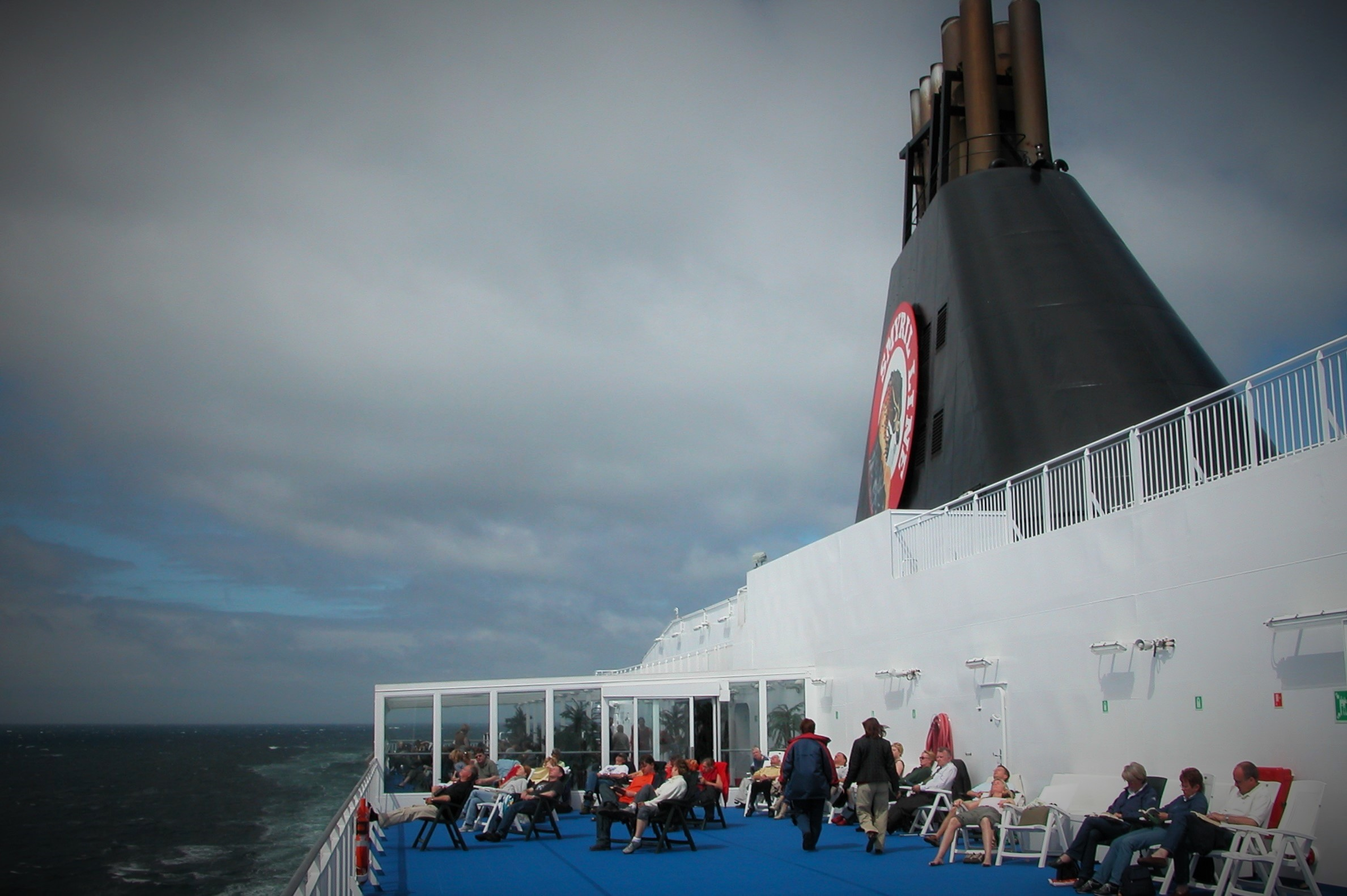
The top deck of Norröna

For passengers the ship is equipped with restaurants, a swimming pool, a small cinema and a fitness centre. Room types include cabins for two, cabins for families, connecting cabins, single berths in a four-person cabin and a dorm-style space with shared bathroom. The ferry also sails in the winter months, but there are few tourists on these trips and therefore only a crew of 20–25 is needed. In the winter months the ferry also changes from being a luxury ship to be more of a container ship.

Norröna also observes ocean currents and water properties in the North Sea, the Faroe-Shetland Channel, and the Iceland-Faroe Ridge for the American Geophysical Union.

The new Norröna cost about 100 million Euro, which nearly broke Smyril, and gave some financial difficulties, but with public support guaranteed the Norröna remains a Faroese ship.

== Routes and operations ==
Norröna operates weekly services connecting Hirtshals, Denmark, to Tórshavn, the Faroe Islands, and Seyðisfjörður, Iceland. The Hirtshals–Tórshavn crossing takes approximately 40 hours (664 nautical miles), while the Seyðisfjörður–Tórshavn crossing takes about 20 hours (304 nautical miles).

== Alternative routes ==
The ferry has visited Newcastle upon Tyne, England, as a Christmas shopping special, allowing visitors a day in the city.

When the weather is bad on the Faroe Islands, the ship may dock at the alternative ports of Klaksvík or Runavík instead of Tórshavn.

== Incidents ==
In January 2004, there was an accident with the new Norröna in Tórshavn, when the ferry hit the wharf and suffered slight damage.

In November 2007, Norröna lost power in heavy seas near the Shetland Islands; the ferry began to roll and eighty cars were damaged on the car deck. The ship was forced to stop at Lerwick for emergency repairs to the heavily damaged stabilisers.

In August 2019, 45 kilograms (99 lb) of cocaine and amphetamines discovered on the car deck of Norröna off the coast of Iceland. Icelandic police arrested the two suspected smugglers and seized the vehicle.

In June 2025, a passenger fell overboard off the coast of Norway and was not recovered.

== In popular culture ==
Norröna plays a major part in the 2015 Icelandic mystery television series Trapped (Icelandic: Ófærð)

She was featured in detail in the documentary television programme Mighty Ships, on the Discovery channel in some countries and on other networks in others. The episode first aired in early December 2017 in Canada. The series is said to be available in over 150 countries.
