= TeenStreet =

Christian youth event

TeenStreet is an annual international week-long congress for Christian teenagers between 13 and 17 years old. It is presented by Operation Mobilisation. The first TeenStreet, held in Offenburg, Germany in 1993, hosted about 50 people. It was part of the Love Europe Congress. Today, over 4,500 teenagers and volunteers attend the German TeenStreet congress each summer. In recent years, TeenStreet events have also been launched and held annually in Uruguay, Brazil, India, South Africa, Malaysia, Australia and Faroe Islands. Each event is coordinated locally by Operation Mobilisation's home offices. Program direction is coordinated internationally, led by Dan & Suzie Potter and Josh & Debs Walker. The Director of TeenStreet International is Ewout van Oosten. In the summer of 2007, Josh & Debs Walker assumed the responsibility of program leadership for TeenStreet in Germany. The leadership team for the biggest TeenStreet event in Germany consists of Matthias Vögelin (CH), Eva Messmer (CH), Aaron Lewis (UK) Alex Müller (DE) .

TeenStreet was named by Dan & Suzie Potter also known as DUZIE. The name was created in November 1992 in Poland. It came as the result of needing a name that would be understood internationally. The "Teen" part was who it was for, and the "Street" part was about having a why to go. The purpose from the beginning was to motivate and equip Christian teens to have a real friendship with Jesus and reflecting Jesus in their world.

As of August 2010 there have been 46 international TeenStreet congresses.

== German themes and locations ==
- 1993: Offenburg – You Can Change Your World
- 1994: Friedrichshafen – Living in an Upside Down World
- 1995: Wolfsburg – Another Day in Paradise
- 1996: Mosbach – Original Copy
- 1997: Offenburg – Theatre of Life
- 1998: Wolfsburg – Dare To Dream
- 1999: Offenburg – Inside Out Revolution
- 2000: Mosbach – The Image
- 2001: Offenburg – Kingdom Come
- 2002: Oldenburg – Secrets Revealed
- 2003: Offenburg – re:Discovering Jesus
- 2004: Oldenburg – Driving At The Speed Of Life
- 2005: Münster – Time Machine: Remember The Future
- 2006: Offenburg – Metamorphosis: The Heart of Change
- 2007: Oldenburg – Contagious: Infect Your Sphere
- 2008: Oldenburg – Blindsight
- 2009: Offenburg – Impossible
- 2010: Oldenburg – PS XXIII
- 2011: Offenburg – "REAL"
- 2012: Oldenburg – "NewSong 40"
- 2013: Offenburg – ">>MORE"
- 2014: Münster – "OPEN"
- 2015: Offenburg – "Home"
- 2016: Oldenburg – "Life"
- 2017: Offenburg – "Unshakeable"
- 2018: Oldenburg – "CLOSER"
- 2019: Offenburg – "Inspired"
- 2022: s-Hertogenbosch – "Unfold"
- 2023: Offenburg – "SEEN"
- 2024: Offenburg – "DUNAMIS"
- 2025: Offenburg – "SEVEN"
- 2026: Offenburg – "PATHS"

== Brazilian themes and locations ==
- 2004: Brazil: Maringá – re:Discovering Jesus (January)
- 2005: Brazil: Maringá – Driving At The Speed Of Life (January)
- 2006: Brazil: Maringá – Time Machine: Remember the Future (22–27 January 2006)
- 2007: Brazil: Maringá – Metamorphosis: The Heart of Change (January)
- 2008: Brazil: Maringá Contagious (20–27 January 2008)
- 2009: Brazil: Maringá – Blind (26–31 January 2009)
- 2010: Brazil: Maringá – Impossible (25–31 January 2010)
- 2011: Brazil: Maringá – PS XXIII (17–23 January 2011)
