= Koorong =

Australian Christian bookseller

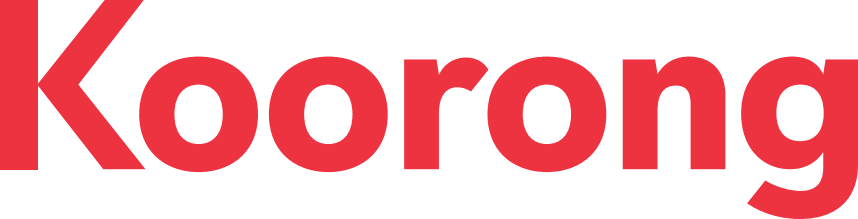
- Founded: 1978
- Founders: Bruce and Olive Bootes
- Headquarters: Sydney, Australia
- Number of locations: 15
- Parent: Excelsia University College
- Website: koorong.com

Koorong is a Christian bookstore chain operating across Australia. It is the largest retailer of Bibles, Christian books and media in Australia. It is owned by Excelsia University College. Koorong currently operates online and at 15 stores across the country.

== History ==
Koorong began as a family-owned company over 40 years ago in Marsfield, Sydney, in the garage of the Koorong Street home of Bruce Bootes - a retired veterinarian and Reformed Baptist pastor - and his wife Olive. In 1978, their son, Paul began the management of his family's bookshop business.

Koorong opened their first Sydney store in Ryedale Road, West Ryde in 1978, moving to larger premises in West Parade, West Ryde in 1995. In August 2005, Koorong took over the three Church Army bookstores at Newcastle, Tamworth and Gosford. Koorong now operates 14 stores across Australia, including Melbourne, Adelaide, Brisbane, Perth, Fyshwick, Toowoomba and Launceston, with approximately 400 staff, Australia-wide and a brochure mailing list of about 120,000.

Koorong was described in 1994 as theologically conservative in terms of the books it sold, which was consistent with its Reformed Baptist roots. Since that time, Koorong's product range has expanded to a broader coverage of the diverse sub-groups and movements associated with contemporary evangelical Christianity, including, for example: Church Growth movement, Charismatic Movement, Progressive Christianity, neo-Calvinism, Emerging church, and the Missional Church movement. Denominational streams represented include Reformed/Presbyterian, Baptist, Anglican, Pentecostal, Lutheran, Anabaptist, and Wesleyan.

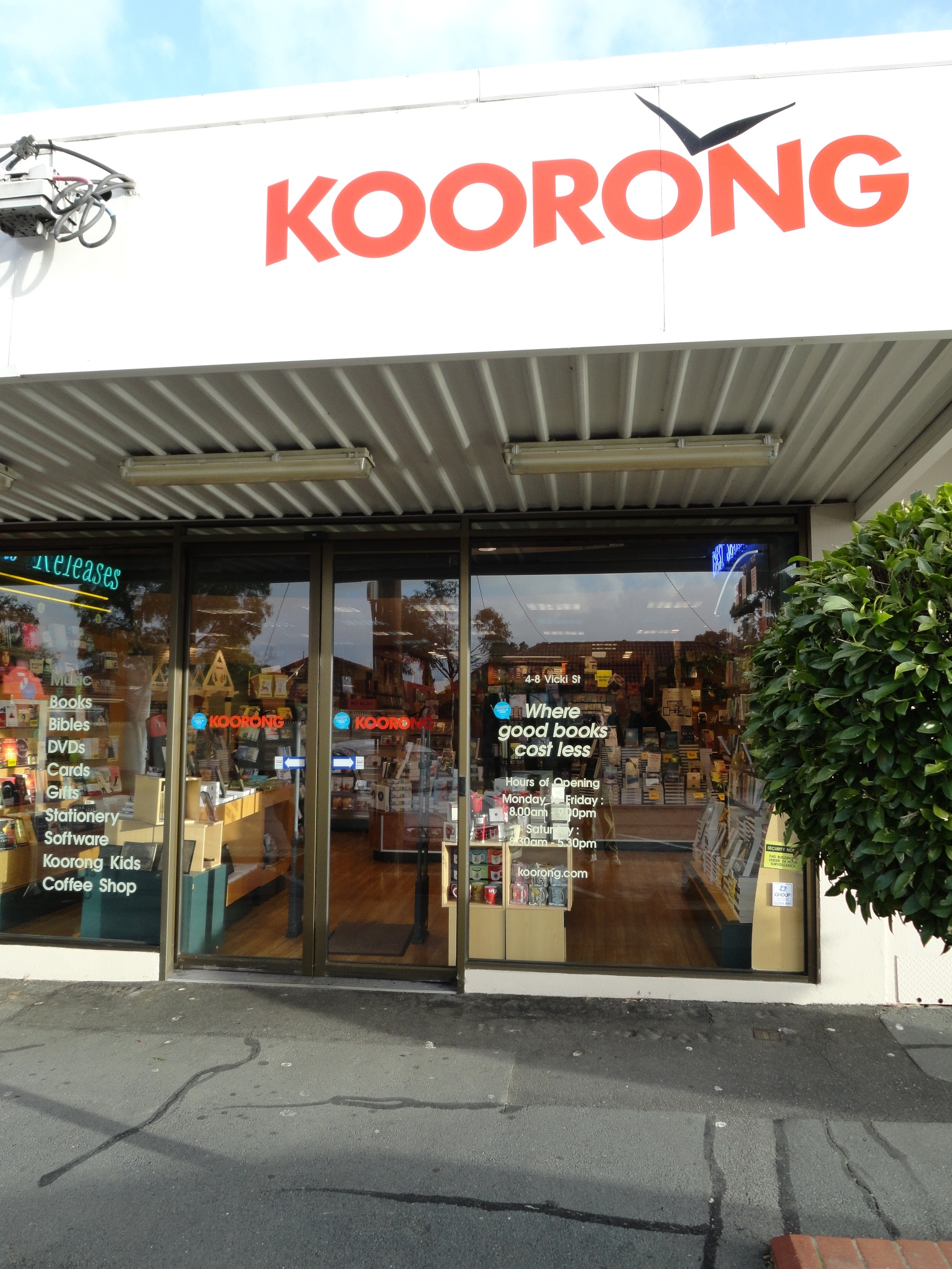
A Koorong bookstore in the Melbourne suburb of Blackburn

In addition to a comprehensive range of Bibles, the subject categories and themes of Koorong's product range include: practical guidance on Christian living; popular devotionals; apologetics; academic theology and biblical studies; ministry resources; romance, suspense, and historical fiction; inspirational giftware; classic authors; Bible reference works and commentaries; contemporary worship music.

In December 2009 Koorong purchased UK-based book publisher Authentic Media and Paternoster Publishers from IBS-STL. In 2014, Koorong acquired a significant share of BroadStreet Publishing Group LLC, with a creative HQ based in Minneapolis.

In August 2015 Koorong was acquired by Bible Society Australia. Bible Society Australia's CEO Greg Clarke had said: "We will now be able to share our important Bible work with, and garner support from, Koorong customers. What’s more, those who shop at Koorong can now know that their purchases will fund even more important Bible mission projects here and around the world.". The Bootes family retained ownership of Authentic Media, Paternoster Press and their share of BroadStreet Publishing Group LLC. The purchase of Koorong Books Pty Limited and Crossroads Pty Limited had a cost of $6.5 million.

After 40 years in the Christian bookselling industry, Paul Bootes retired as managing director of Koorong in July 2017 and his brother, Rob Bootes became CEO. In July 2018, after Rob Bootes stepped down, David Foster took over the reins at Koorong as general manager. In February 2020 Koorong announced a brand refresh across digital platforms and stores.

Koorong was acquired by Excelsia University College, effective 31 March 2025. Richard Grellman, Deputy Chair, Excelsia University College commented:

“Koorong has faithfully served the Christian community for over 40 years, and we are deeply committed to ensuring it flourishes for the next 40 and beyond. EUC brings a faith-driven vision and strong leadership that will build upon Koorong’s rich heritage, strengthening its role as Australia’s leading Christian retailer and expanding its ability to serve the church and individual Christians across the nation.”
