= MV Doulos Phos =

Retired ocean liner and cruise ship

Coordinates: 1.160922°N 104.316206°E

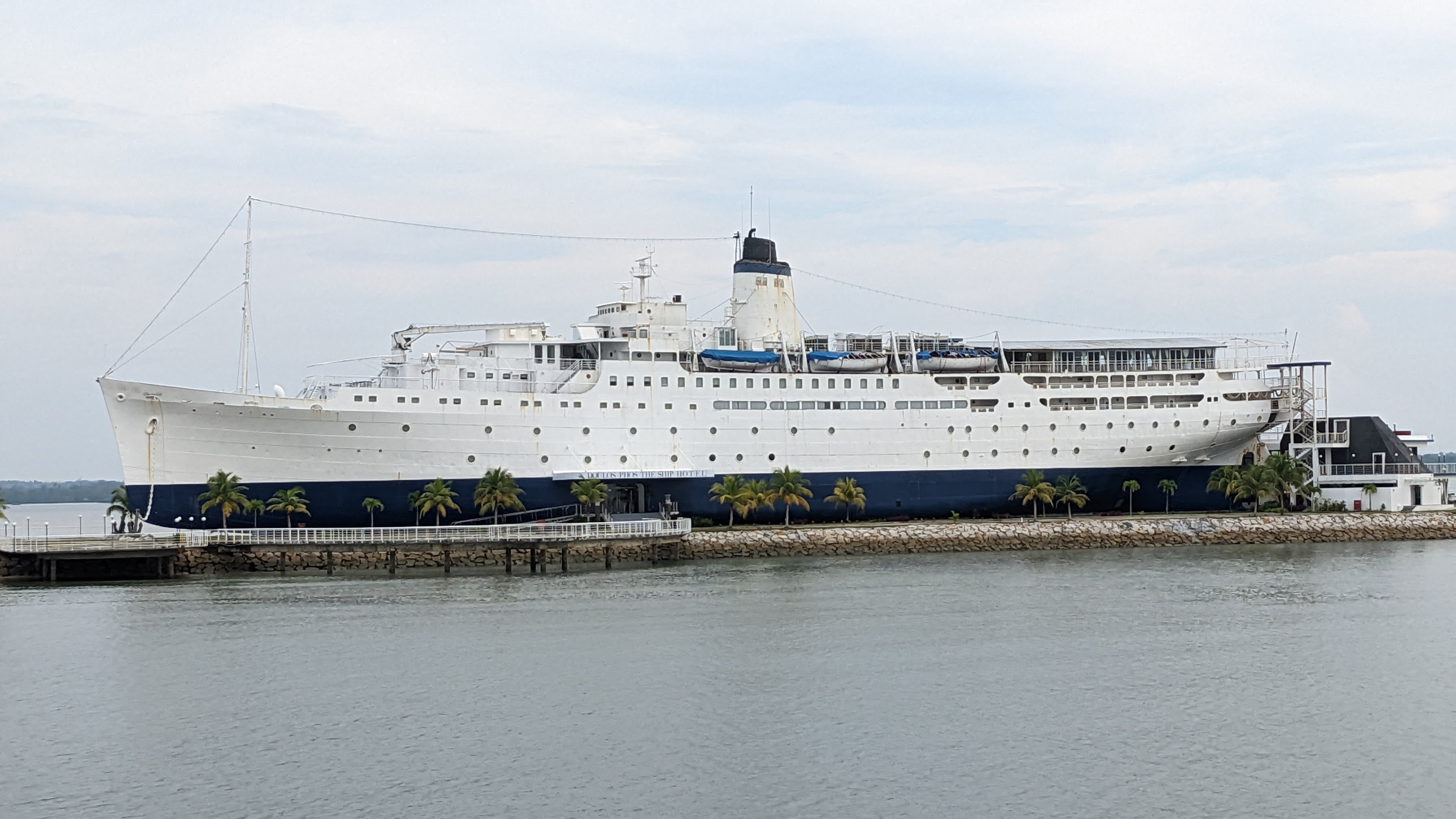
- MV Doulos Phos hoisted onto dry land and converted into a hotel in Bintan, Indonesia

History

United States
- Name: Medina
- Namesake: Medina River, Texas
- Operator: Mallory Steamship Company (1914–1932) Clyde-Mallory Line (1932–1948)
- Ordered: 28 August 1913
- Builder: Newport News Shipbuilding and Dry Dock Company
- Yard number: 176
- Laid down: 21 January 1914
- Launched: 22 August 1914
- Sponsored by: Frances Stuart Semmes
- Christened: 22 August 1914
- Acquired: 29 September 1914
- Commissioned: 29 September 1914
- Fate: Transferred to Cia Naviera San Miguel SA, 1948

Panama
- Name: Roma
- Operator: Cia Naviera San Miguel SA
- Acquired: 1948
- Fate: Sold to Costa Lines, 1953

Italy
- Name: Franca C
- Operator: Costa Lines
- Port of registry: Genoa, Italy
- Acquired: 1953
- Fate: Sold to Gute Bücher für Alle, 1977

Malta
- Name: Doulos (1977–2010); Doulos Phos (from 2010)
- Operator: Gute Bücher für Alle (1977–2010); BizNaz Resources International Pte Ltd (from 2010)
- Port of registry: Valletta, Malta
- Identification: Call sign 9HKF; IMO number: 5119105; MMSI number: 256056000
- Fate: converted to a static hotel ship, 2015
- Notes: Greek "Doulos" means "Servant", "Doulos Phos" means "Servant of Light"

General characteristics (as built)
- Tonnage: 5,426 GRT
- Length: 427.66 feet (130.35 m)
- Beam: 55.2 feet (16.8 m)
- Height: 54 feet (16 m)
- Draught: 18.2 feet (5.5 m)
- Installed power: Single triple-expansion engine, 4 coal-fired boilers, 4,100 horsepower (3,100 kW) shaft power (Converted to oil 1922)
- Speed: 14 knots (26 km/h)

General characteristics (1949 onwards)
- Tonnage: 6,822 GRT (1960); 6,549 GRT (1984); 6,818 GT (2009)
- Propulsion: GMT C4218SS; V-18 cyl. 4-stroke; 5958 kW (8100 bhp); Intermediate Fuel; Renk Reduction Gear; Fixed Pitch Propeller
- Speed: 15 knots (28 km/h)
- Capacity: 414
- Crew: 350

MV Doulos Phos is a retired ocean liner, and former cruise ship, that held the record of being the world's oldest active ocean-going passenger ship, serving from 1914 until December 2009. She is now owned by Eric Saw, director and chief executive of BizNaz Resources International Pte Ltd in Singapore. She was previously operated by the German charity Gute Bücher für Alle (Good Books for All), and was used as a floating bookshop and missionary ship. The ship has previously been known as SS Medina, SS Roma, MV Franca C, and MV Doulos. Doulos ended her final cruise in late 2009 at Singapore, with the ship being handed over to her new owners on 18 March 2010. The ship underwent a three-year conversion into a luxury hotel that saw the ship mounted on dry land in nearby Bintan, Indonesia, and opened in June 2019.

== Cargo ship era ==
On 28 August 1913, a contract for two steel freight steamships was signed by Newport News Shipbuilding and Dry Dock Company and the Mallory Steamship Company of the United States. "The vessel will be a single screw steamship of the hurricane deck type with straight stem and elliptical stern, and with deck houses amidship and aft for the crew accommodations...." The original specifications referred to the vessels as hulls No. 175 and No. 176. Hull No. 175 would eventually be named Neches and hull No. 176 became Medina. (Neches was lost in a collision with a British warship in 1918.) The full contract for the vessels filled a 186-page volume and included the fittings commonly used in a ship for her era and also provision for tropical itineraries; for example, mosquito nets for the crew quarters.

== Terrorist attack ==
On 11 August 1991, during the final night of the Doulos' stop in the southern Philippine port of Zamboanga City, two of her foreign crewmembers were killed when a grenade, thrown by members of the Abu Sayyaf Islamist terrorist group, exploded on stage during a performance by its Christian volunteers. Four locals were also killed and 32 others were injured, including several crew members of the missionary ship.

In 1995, in order to conform to the then new SOLAS regulations, she was fitted with a sprinkler system, and combustible wall panels were removed and replaced. This unfortunately meant the loss of many of the wall murals that had been installed by Costa Lines.

In 2006, while in Bahrain, a satellite communication system was installed.

Statistics as MV Doulos
Total visitors	21,461,212
Programme attendance	3,500,898
Books sold	1,513,446
Nautical miles sailed	358,121
Total ports visited	603
Countries and territories visited	104
Different ports visited	297

== Decommissioning ==
In 2009, while Doulos was in dry dock in Singapore, a survey conducted by the ship's classification society, RINA, found numerous significant problems with the ship's machinery, structure, and systems that would require work to have been completed by 31 December 2009 for the ship's certificates to be reissued and allow continued sailing. The shipyard servicing the Doulos would not accept the ship for repairs until September 2010; with the cost of the work exceeding 10 million euros, and the limited ministry that the ship would have after the repairs, it was decided to end the Doulos Ministry at the end of 2009, instead of 2010 as originally planned. The ship was offered for scrap at the end of 2009 when her operational certification expired. A caretaker crew remained with Doulos, expecting to sail her to the breakers.

== New owners ==
On 18 March 2010, Doulos was purchased by a new owner, Eric Saw, director and chief executive of BizNaz Resources International Pte Ltd in Singapore. She was renamed Doulos Phos (Servant of Light). In 2015, BizNaz formed a joint venture with two other companies with the intention of converting the ship into a luxury hotel. That August the ship was towed out of Singapore to Batam, Indonesia, to be refurbished before moving to Bintan Island to become part of a US$25 million hotel resort. In October 2015 she went into drydock, where her hull was refurbished. Steel reinforcement bracing was added inside her hull to support her weight on dry land. She was then towed to a location adjacent to the Bandar Bentan Telani Ferry Terminal. Using a system of pulling cables and air bags, the ship was hoisted onto the promontory point. This marked the end of her career as a floating ship.

== Hotel conversion ==
In February 2016 the ship was officially renamed Doulos Phos, The Ship Hotel and began conversion into a luxury hotel. The conversion was expected to retain the ship's bridge and engine room as part of a Maritime Heritage Museum, and Decks A and B to be used as the hotel. Originally scheduled to open in late 2016, workers and heavy equipment were still on the site in November 2017. The hotel opened in 2019 with 104 rooms, all with a sea view. The hotel closed during the COVID-19 pandemic in 2020 and reopened in August 2022. In an August 21, 2025 interview with CNN, Saw, claimed he had spent around 23 million Singapore dollars ($18 million) of his own money transforming it into a luxury hotel.

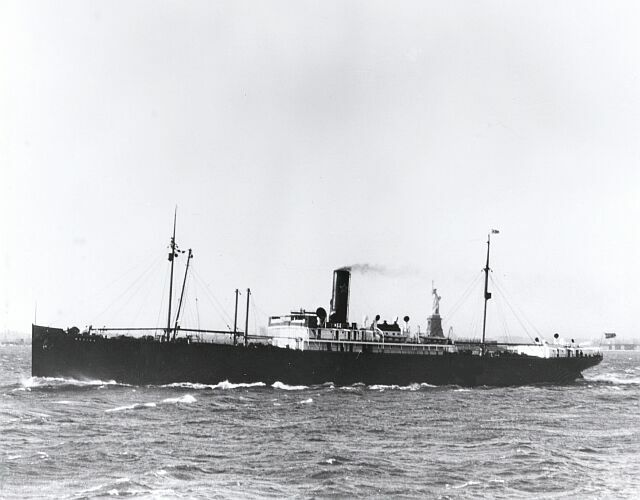
Medina in New York on her maiden voyage, passing the Statue of Liberty in 1914

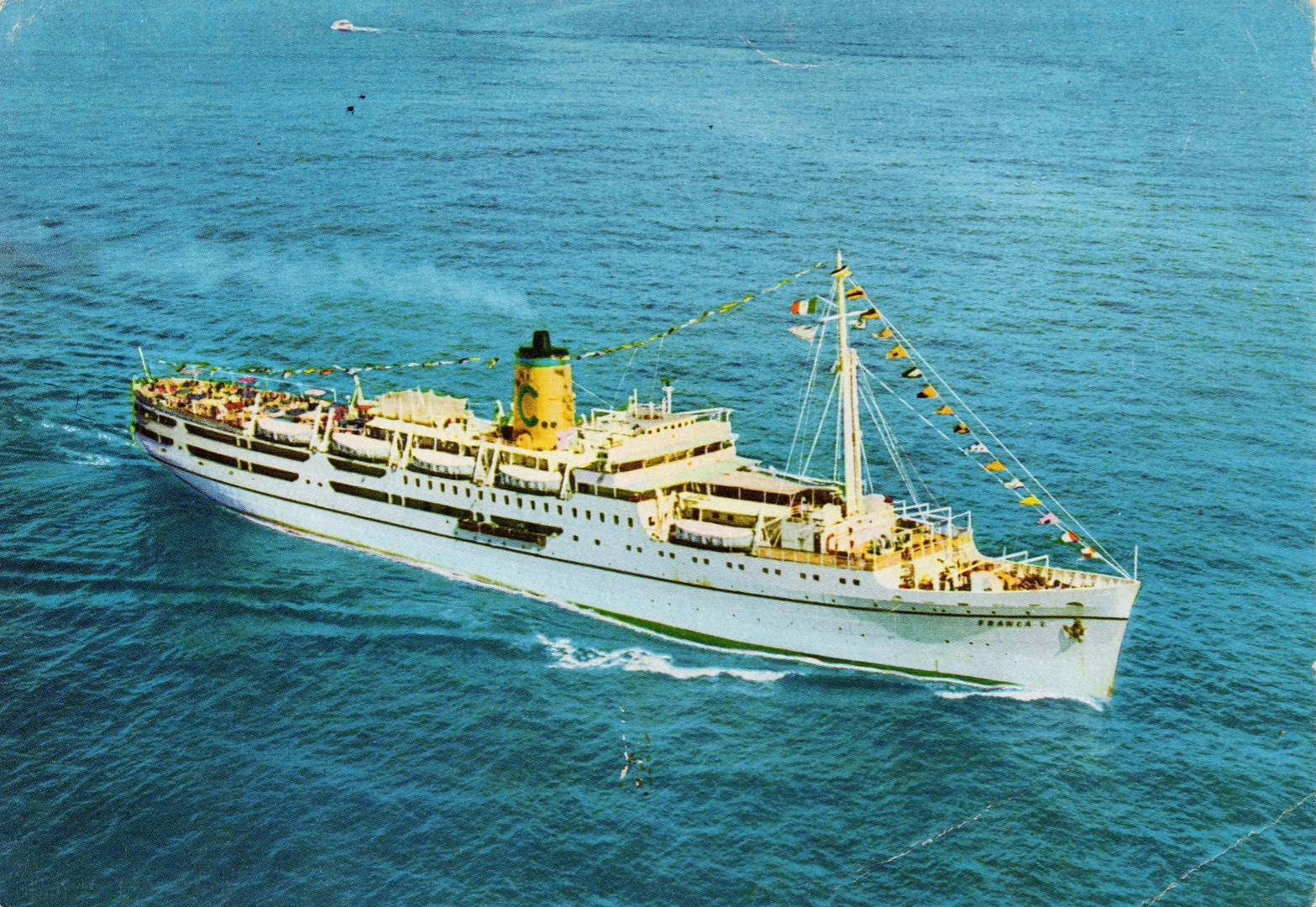
Franca C

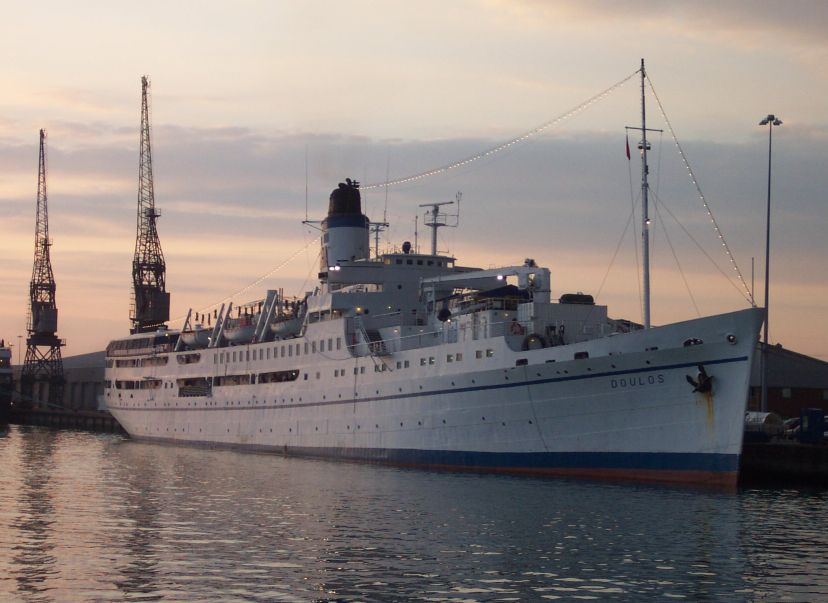
Doulos at Southampton, England in 2004

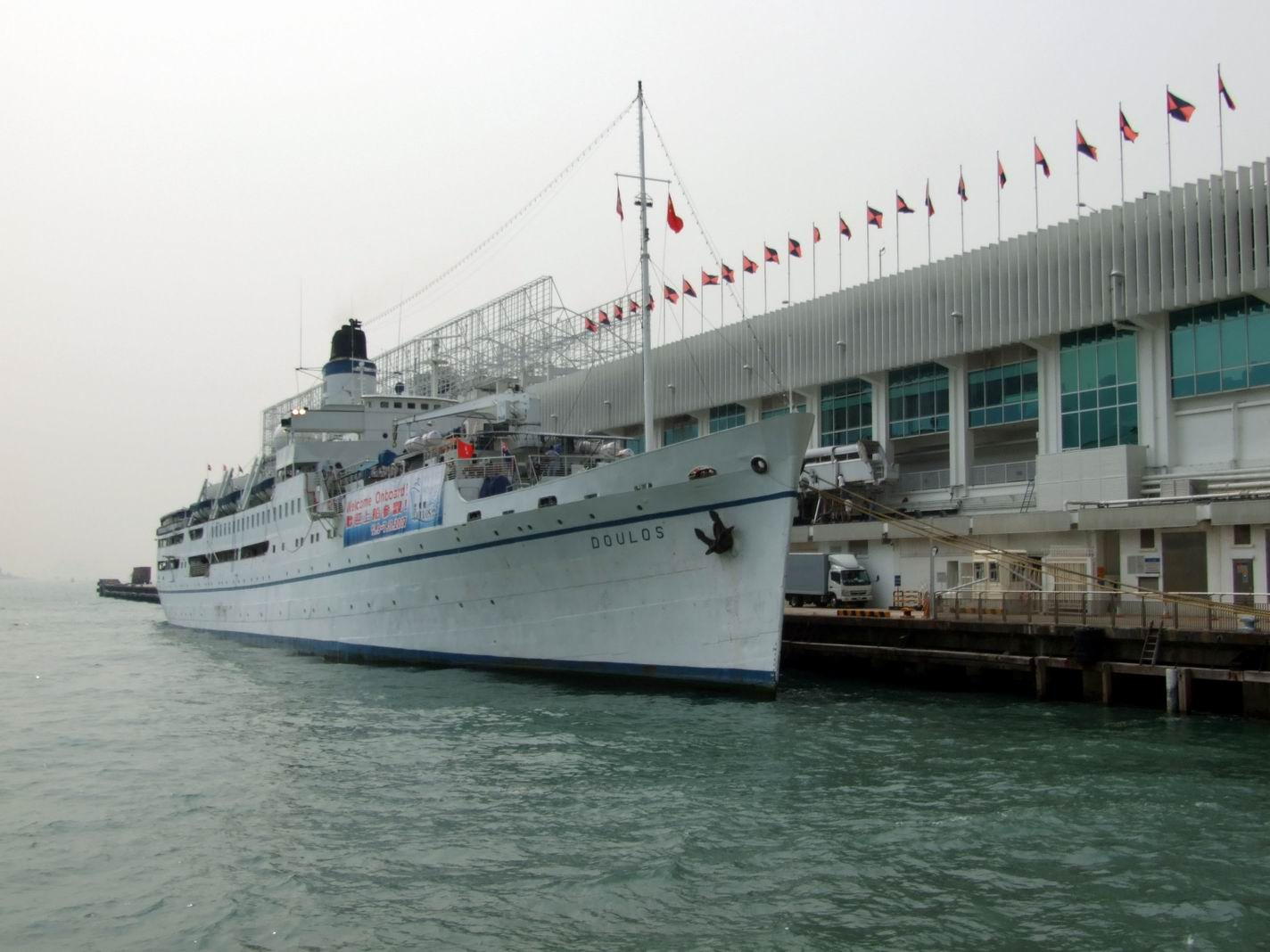
Doulos in Hong Kong

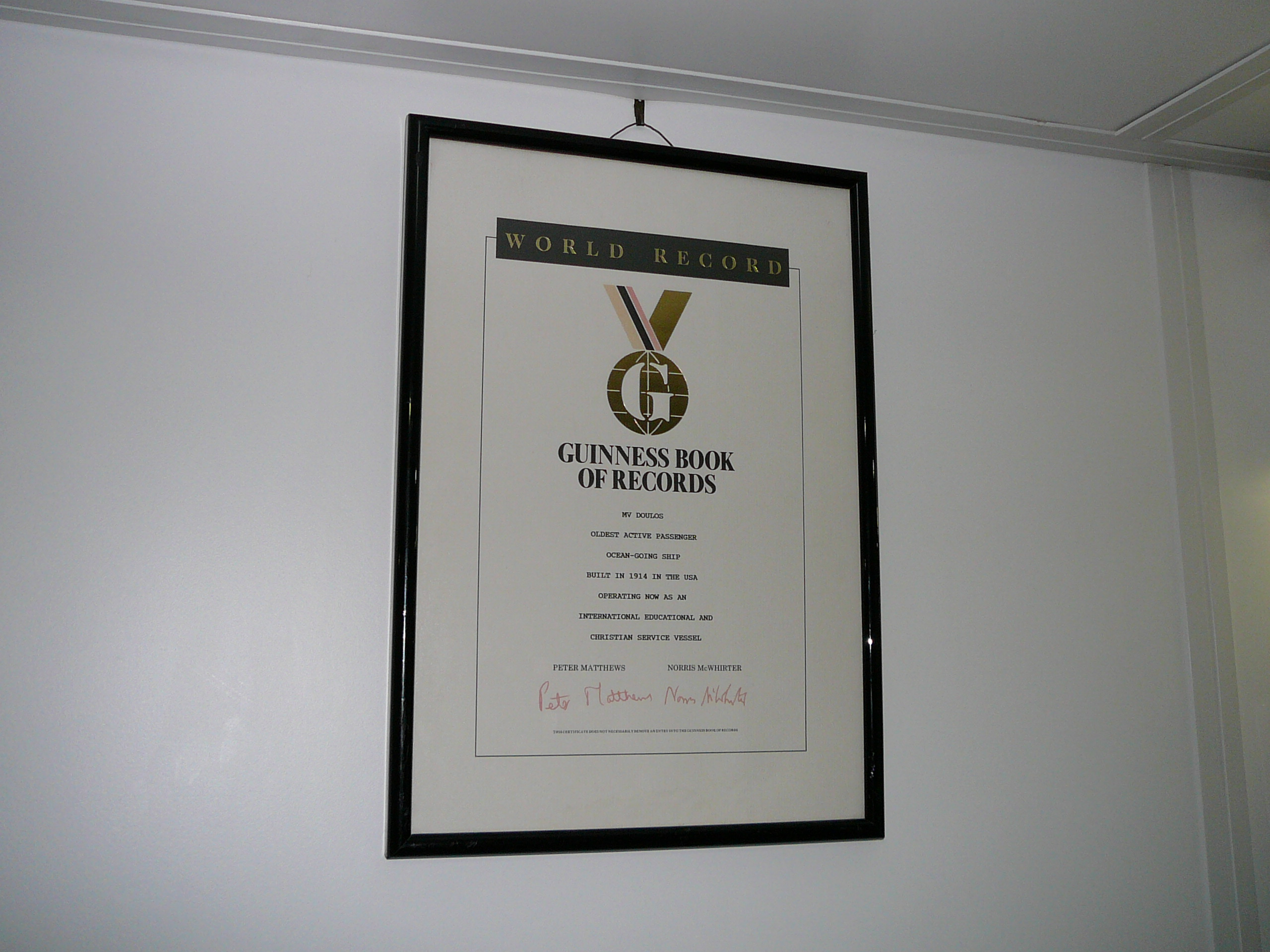
"Oldest active passenger ocean-going ship" citation

== See also ==
- MV Logos II
- MV Logos Hope
