= Biblica =

Non-profit organization in the USA

- Founded: 1809; 216 years ago
- Founders: Henry Rutgers, William Colgate, and Thomas Eddy
- Country of origin: United States
- Headquarters location: Palmer Lake, Colorado
- Official website: www.biblica.com

Biblica is an American Bible society founded in 1809 as the New York Bible Society to enable the publication and distribution of the Bible in many languages for Christian mission work. Long known as the International Bible Society (IBS), it sponsored and holds the copyright of the New International Version (NIV), a widely used English translation of the Bible.

In 1992 and 2007 IBS merged with two other prominent Bible societies. In 2009 the combined organization was named Biblica. Biblica is a member of the Forum of Bible Agencies International.

== History ==
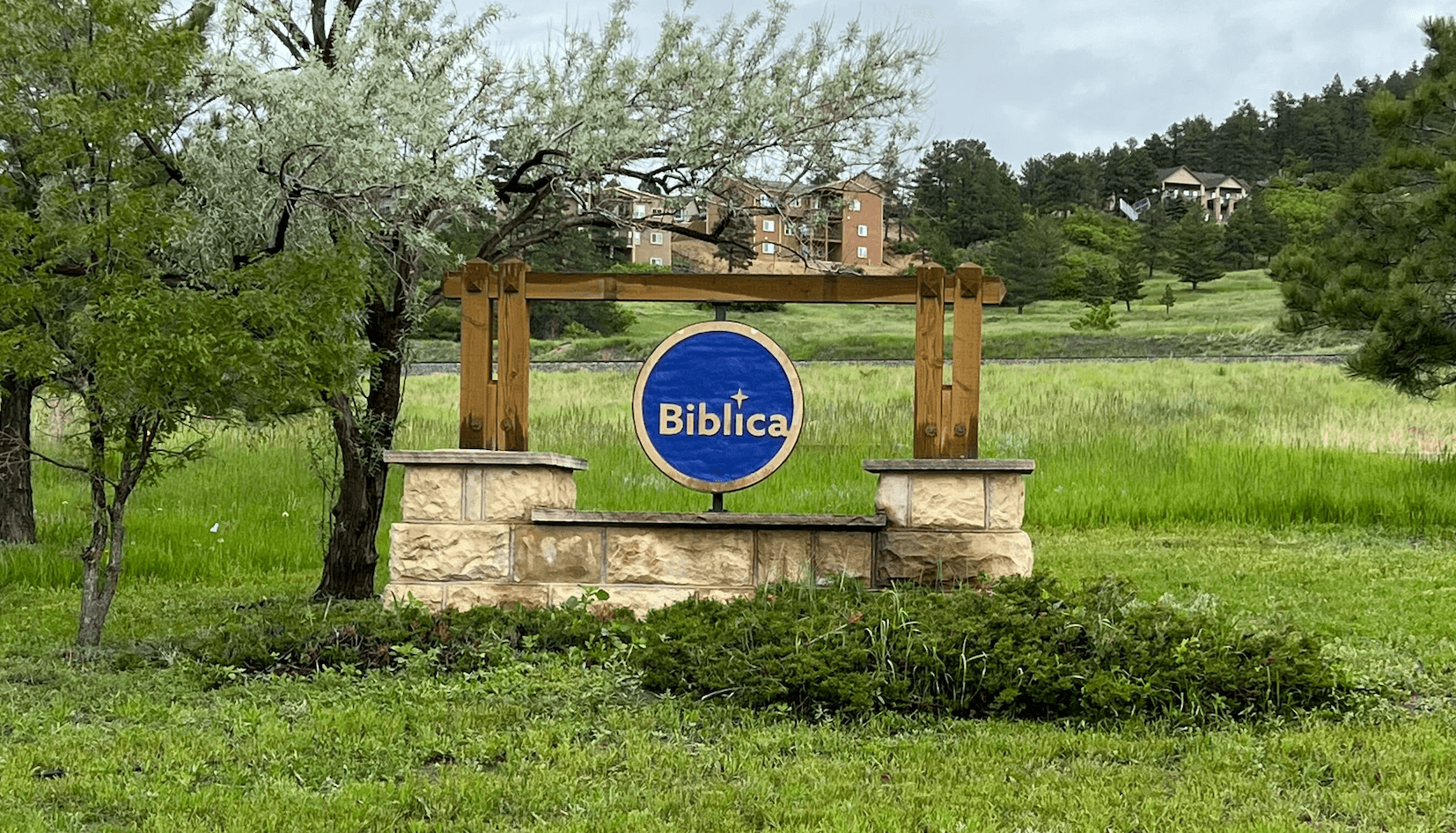
Biblica headquarters in Palmer Lake.

A group of American supporters of Christian missions, including Henry Rutgers, William Colgate, Theodorus Van Wyke and Thomas Eddy, founded the New York Bible Society on December 4, 1809 in New York City. In 1819 the society merged with the New York Auxiliary Bible Society to form the New York International Bible Society.

In 1974 the name was shortened to International Bible Society (IBS). The organization moved its headquarters to Colorado Springs in 1988 and to its current building in 1989. It merged with Living Bibles International in 1992 and Send the Light (STL) in 2007, forming a new organization called IBS-STL. In 2009 IBS-STL was renamed Biblica.

== Translations ==
Biblica's international ministry began in 1810 with its sponsorship of William Carey’s Bible translation work in India. The company's best-known translation is the New International Version.

== See also ==
- Bible society
- Zondervan
