= H. L. Ellison =

Polish-born British scholar and missionary

Henry Leopold Ellison (July 10, 1903 – July 10, 1983), usually cited as H. L. Ellison, was a biblical scholar, professor, missionary, speaker and author. His parents were Leopold Zeckhausen and Sara Jane Ellison. His father, being a Jewish Believer, was a missionary to the Jews throughout Europe.

== Biography ==
Ellison was born on July 10, 1903 in Kraków, Poland. He and his brother, Christian (a missionary in China), changed their last names from Zeckhausen to Ellison in 1925 to better assimilate into British society.

Following in his father's footsteps, Ellison was an Anglican missionary to the Jews in Europe in the late 1920s and '30s. However, after receiving Believer's Baptism, he was kicked out of the Church of England. Upon his return to Britain, he held many positions in the academic realm as a respected Old Testament scholar and became associated with the Open Brethren.

He was a friend and colleague of F. F. Bruce.

He died on July 10, 1983 in Dawlish.

== Books ==
- Men Spake From God (1952)
- Ezekiel: The Man and His Message (1956)
- The Christian Approach to a Jew (1958)
- From Tragedy to Triumph: A Study of Job (1958)
- The Household Church: Apostolic Practice in a Modern Setting (1963)
- Understanding the Old Testament: Joshua - 2 Samuel (1966)
- The Mystery of Israel: An Exposition of Romans 9-11 (1966)
- The Psalms (1968)
- The Message of the Old Testament (1969)
- The Prophets of Israel (1969)
- Understanding the New Testament: 1 Peter - Revelation (1969)
- Understanding a Jew (1972)
- From Babylon to Bethlehem (1976)
- Fathers of the Covenant (1978)
- Understanding Bible Teachings: Jesus as Man (1978)
- Exodus (1982)
