= Operation Mobilisation =

Christian organisation

Operation Mobilisation (OM)
- Founded: 1957
- Founder: George Verwer, Dale Rhoton
- Type: Evangelical Missions Agency
- Location: International
- Region served: More than 147 countries
- Key people: Iain Pickett, International Director (2025 – ); Lawrence Tong, International Director (2013–2025); Peter Maiden, International Director (2003–2013)
- Website: www.om.org, www.omships.org

Operation Mobilisation (OM; aka Operation Mission in some countries, or only OM) is a Christian missionary organisation founded by George Verwer to mobilise young people to live and share the Gospel of Jesus. OM started in Mexico and had spread to Europe and India by 1963.

OM currently has more than 4,500 people, representing 125 nationalities serving in over 147 countries around the world, seeking to "see vibrant communities of Jesus followers among the least reached". OM's guiding values are imitating Jesus and participating in holistic, Kingdom transformation of all life and creation, cultivating a biblically just and diverse community; with strategic innovation in their ministries, they remain in mutual commitment to the cause of Christ and care for people. They accomplish these core values through church planting, evangelism, relief and development, justice, and mentoring and discipleship.

== History ==
George Verwer, OM's founder and leader until 2003, received a Gospel of John from a local woman while still in high school in the 1950s. In 1955, Verwer became a Christian at a Billy Graham meeting at Madison Square Garden, and made a commitment to global missions and spreading Christianity on a large scale.

Operation Mobilisation started in 1957 when Walter Borchard, Dale Rhoton and George Verwer traveled to Mexico to distribute Christian literature and Gospels. The Gospels were very important to the men and the beginning of OM's long history. The trip in 1957 was the first of three summer trips to Mexico. By 1960, the men turned their attention to Europe, focusing on mobilising the national churches to global missions. Verwer's vision for the global mission was that leadership would come from the local Christian community, wherever possible, rather than from foreigners.

In Summer 1962 OM's first short-term missions teams moved into Europe, coming from the UK, Spain, Germany, Netherlands, Switzerland, the US and elsewhere. In the summer of 1963 more than 2,000 people blanketed Europe to encourage Christians and to carry God's Word throughout the continent and find creative ways of getting it behind the Iron Curtain. OM teams were also starting in India and the Middle East in 1963.

OM and Verwer's vision for spreading the Gospel expanded to the seas with the purchase of the ship MV Logos in October 1970. Thereafter OM expanded its ships ministry with the MV Doulos, MV Logos II and MV Logos Hope. In 2023 a fifth ship, MV Doulos Hope, was put into service together with MV Logos Hope, the previous three having been retired.

Back in Europe, summer conferences were continuing but the number of participants was dwindling. In late 1987, a renewed vision for reaching Europe was born, which led to the "Love Europe" outreaches that started in July 1989, just prior to the fall of the Iron Curtain. OM planned for 5,000 young people from 50 nations to participate; in fact, about 7,000 from 76 nations came. With this first "Love Europe" conference, the vision of OM – birthed in Europe – had been renewed. OM's operations in Europe today includes ministry in more than 30 countries.

On 7 March 2013, OM appointed a new international director, only the third in its nearly 56-year history. Lawrence Tong, from Singapore, took over the OM leadership from Peter Maiden, from the UK, who had served and led in the role since 2003. Lawrence, who has served as director of OM's ship Logos II, assumed responsibility on 1 September 2013 and served until 2025. During that time he cultivated the vision and provided guidance to the Global Leadership Team.

In 2025, Dr Iain Pickett, from the UK, was appointed as the next international director. Iain’s educational background is in linguistics (PhD) and for most of his adult life, he has served with OM cross-culturally.

== OM ships ==
Currently, OM Ships operates two ships serving destinations around the world, the MV Logos Hope and the MV Doulos Hope. These ships are operated in conjunction with GBA Ships, who offers a list of ports of call for both vessels.

Their first ship, MV Logos, was purchased in 1970. Over a 17-year period, more than 6.5 million people visited MV Logos during 408 ports of call in 108 countries.

OM's second ship, the MV Doulos, previously held the record for the oldest ocean-going ship still in service. She was retired at the end of 2009.

MV Logos ran aground on rocks off Tierra del Fuego, Chile, in atrocious weather conditions in 1988. Although the ship could not be saved, not a single crew member was lost or injured. The skeletal hulk of the ship is still visible and has become something of a tourist attraction over the years.

Later in 1988, the former MV Antonio Lazaro became the MV Logos II, which was retired in July 2008 after welcoming 11 million visitors.

MV Logos Hope was launched into service in 2009. Twice the size of the MV Doulos, it provides much greater capacity to serve communities.

MV Doulos Hope was purchased in 2022 and launched into service in 2023, and is expected to serve in the Southeast Asia area.

The OM ships have visited port cities throughout the world, supplying literature, encouraging cross-cultural understanding, training young people for more effective life and service, providing relief, and sharing a message of hope in God wherever there is an opportunity. Since 1970, OM's ships have visited 480 different ports in 151 countries and territories around the globe.

In total, over 45 million visitors have come aboard to purchase from the selection of 5,000 titles available in the ships' floating bookstores. Titles cover a wide range of subjects, such as science, sports, hobbies, cookery, the arts, philosophy, medicine and children's books, as well as faith and life. The books have been carefully chosen to be of interest to every member of the family, and with the educational, social and moral needs of the local community in mind. Books are on offer at a fraction of their retail value, and, while in certain ports, books are also donated.

As of June 2023, the ships' timeline is as follows:

== See also ==
- TeenStreet, an annual international week-long congress for Christian teenagers presented by OM
