= MV Logos Hope =

1973 Ship operating as a floating book fair and mission ship

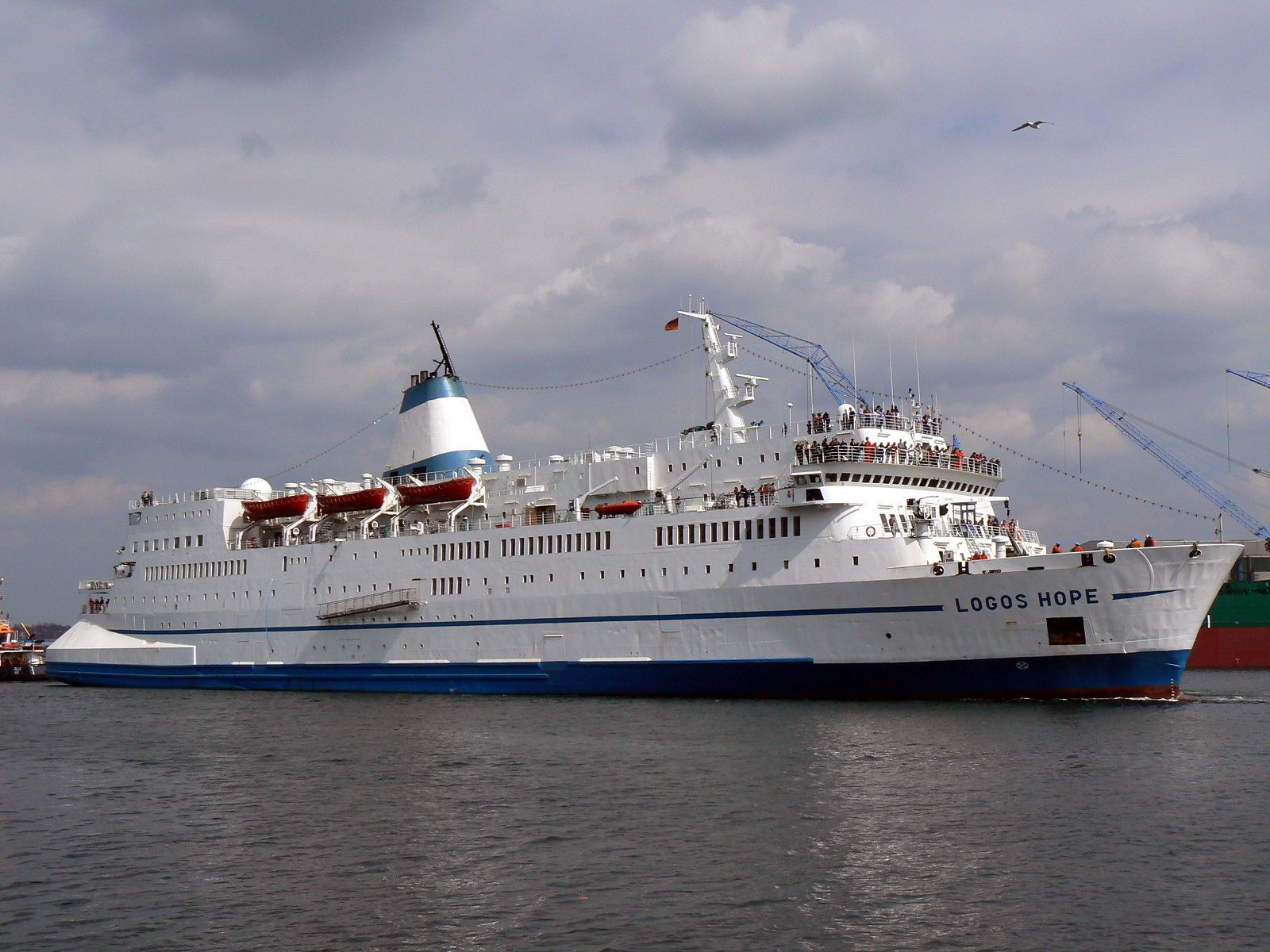
- Logos Hope in Kiel (2008)

History
- Name: 1973–1983: Gustav Vasa; 1983–2003: Norröna; 2003–2004: Norröna I; 2004 onwards: Logos Hope
- Operator: 1973–1976: Lion Ferry AB / Öresundsbolaget; 1976–1980: Saga Line; 1980–1983: TT Saga Line; 1983–2004: Smyril Line; 2004 onwards: GBA Ships e.V.
- Port of registry: 1973–1983: Halmstad Sweden; 1983–2011: Tórshavn, Faroe Islands; 2011 onwards: Valletta, Malta
- Ordered: 1972
- Builder: Nobiskrug, Rendsburg, Germany
- Yard number: 678
- Laid down: 1973 (est)
- Launched: 10 February 1973
- Completed: 12 May 1973
- Identification: IMO number: 7302914
- Status: In service

General characteristics
- Class & type: Ropax
- Tonnage: 12,519 GT
- Length: 132.5 m (434 ft 9 in)
- Beam: 21.06 m (69 ft 1 in)
- Draught: 5.22 m (17 ft 2 in)
- Decks: 9
- Ramps: 1
- Ice class: PC6
- Installed power: 4 X SWD 6TM 410 RR 6-cylinder diesel engines
- Propulsion: 2 × controllable pitch propellers; 1 × bow thruster
- Speed: 13.5 kn
- Capacity: 442 passengers
- Crew: 300

MV Logos Hope is a ship operated by the German faith-based organisation GBA Ships in partnership with Operation Mobilisation (OM), functioning as the world's largest floating book fair. She was built in 1973 as the ferry MV Gustav Vasa for service between Malmö (Sweden) and Travemünde (Germany) and later operated as the MV Norröna providing a ferry service to the Faroe Islands and Iceland. Following extensive renovations, she entered service as Logos Hope in February 2009.

== History ==
=== Gustav Vasa (1973–1983) ===
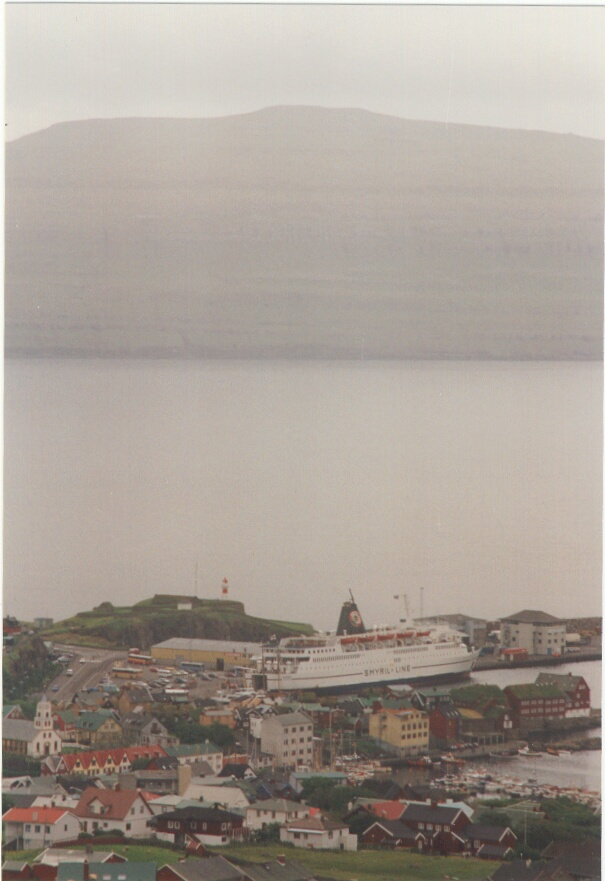
The same ship as MV Norröna in the harbour of Torshavn in 1997

The vessel was launched on 10 February 1973 and delivered to Lion Ferry AB of Halmstad on 12 May 1973 as the car ferry Gustav Vasa, built by Nobiskrug of Rendsburg, Germany (yard number 678). She was immediately chartered to Svenska Rederi AB Öresund for Öresundsbolaget routes between Malmö and Travemünde, Germany, a route she maintained for ten years. Her route was later extended to include Rønne (Denmark) and Trelleborg (Sweden). In October 1976 Öresundsbolaget and Traveline joined forces, marketing services under the name Saga Linjen between Helsingborg/Malmö and Travemünde. In 1980 Saga Linjen and TT-Line joined forces under the new name TT Saga Line.

=== Norröna (1983–2003) ===
In April 1983, she was sold to the Faroese ferry company Smyril Line and renamed Norröna, subsequently being rebuilt at Flensburger Schiffbaugesellschaft in Flensburg to add more cabins and fit stabilisers. Sailing from Tórshavn, the Faroese capital, to Lerwick (Shetland Islands), Bergen (Norway), Hanstholm (Denmark) and Seyðisfjörður (Iceland) each summer, she was often chartered in the winter to cover other operators' overhaul schedules.

==== 1990 fire ====
On 8 April 1990, while on charter to B&I Line for services between Pembroke Dock and Rosslare, the vessel suffered a fire in the passenger accommodation. The ferry had left Pembroke Dock at around 10 pm with approximately 200 passengers and 78 crew aboard. Around midnight, a seaman spotted smoke coming from unoccupied cabins on C-deck, but the vessel was already filling with smoke by the time the alarm was raised. The captain turned the ship around and returned to Pembroke Dock; one crew member died as a result of the fire. The vessel returned to service on 12 April 1990 following repairs. The fire occurred one day after the fatal fire aboard the MS Scandinavian Star in the North Sea, which killed 159 people.

Casualties were evacuated by RAF rescue helicopters to Withybush General Hospital in Haverfordwest.

=== Norröna I (2003–2004) ===
When Smyril Line took delivery of a new Norröna in 2003, the old vessel was renamed Norröna I and put up for sale. GBA Ships purchased the vessel in March 2004.

=== Logos Hope (2004–present) ===
After a period of planning and fundraising, extensive renovations began in June 2005 at the Brodotrogir Shipyard in Trogir, Croatia. The renovation transformed the vessel from a commercial car ferry into a multifunctional mission ship. A new deck was inserted into the former vehicle deck to create a public Visitor Experience area, and an additional deck was added at the stern to accommodate an onboard school for families serving aboard. A new galley was installed, the bridge completely refurbished, machinery in the engine room overhauled, and air-conditioning, sprinkler and electrical systems were renewed.

In November 2007, the ship left Croatia bound for Kiel, Germany, for a further period of outfitting, during which crew and equipment were transferred from her predecessor, Logos II. In May 2008 the ship departed Kiel for dry dock in Landskrona, Sweden, where a larger generator was brought into the engine room through the side of the ship. She then berthed in Køge, Denmark, for final outfitting, including completion of accommodation areas, the Logos Lounge conference room and the Visitor Experience deck.

Logos Hope launched into active service in February 2009. The ship carries over 5,000 book titles in multiple languages and typically remains in each port for approximately two weeks, opening to the public daily. The international volunteer crew, drawn from around 60 nationalities, are all non-salaried and serve for 3 months to 2 years or more on board.

Logos Hope replaced Logos II, which concluded her service with OM in July 2008 after 20 years. She is the largest ship to have served with GBA Ships, with a gross tonnage roughly three times that of Logos II.

== See also ==
- Operation Mobilisation
