= William Hocking =

William Hocking may refer to:

- Bill Hocking, Cornish fisherman
- William Ernest Hocking, American philosopher
- William John Hocking, British numismatist
