= Exclusive Brethren =

Christian evangelical sect

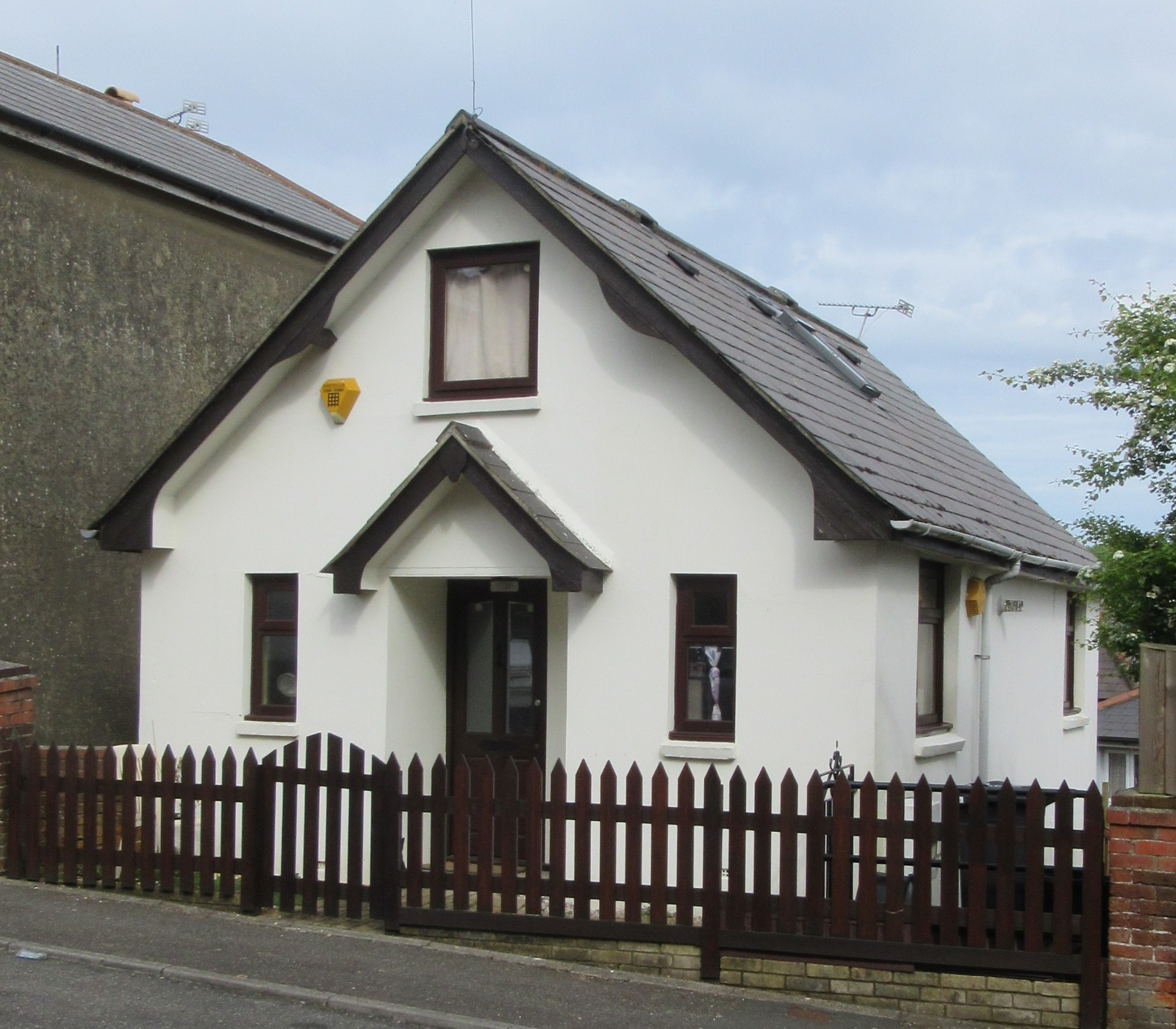
- Classification: Protestant
- Orientation: Plymouth Brethren
- Polity: Connectional
- Region: 19 countries
- Founder: John Nelson Darby
- Origin: 1848; London
- Separations: Numerous schisms

The Exclusive Brethren are a branch of the Plymouth Brethren, an evangelical Christian tradition. They are distinguished from the other major branch, the Open Brethren, from whom they separated in 1848.

The Exclusive Brethren are now divided into a number of fellowships, most of which differ on minor points of doctrine or practice. Exclusive Brethren communities include the Lowe Brethren, Glanton Brethren, Alte Elberfelder Brethren, Pre-Aberdeen Outs Brethren and Post-Aberdeen Outs Brethren, among other fellowships. Though most Exclusive Brethren are not organized as such, the Raven-Taylor-Hales group, known as the Plymouth Brethren Christian Church (PBCC), has a hierarchical structure.

In addition to maintaining the core Plymouth Brethren beliefs (such as the necessity of the new birth, the practice of baptism, and the celebration of the Lord's Supper on the Lord's Day), Exclusive Brethren hold to the doctrine of separation from the world and "keeping the unity of the Spirit".

The Exclusive Brethren groups have one fellowship in some 19 countries – including France, Brazil, Germany, Spain, Italy, Denmark, the Netherlands, Switzerland, Sweden, Argentina, Jamaica, Barbados, St Vincent and the Grenadines, but they are more numerous in Australia, New Zealand, the United Kingdom, and North America, where they are referred to as the Exclusive Brethren or simply the Brethren.

== History ==
=== 19th century ===
The Plymouth Brethren split into Exclusive and Open Brethren in 1848 when George Müller refused to accept John Nelson Darby's view of the relationship between local assemblies following difficulties in the Plymouth meeting. Brethren that held Muller's congregational view became known as "Open", those holding Darby's 'connexional' view, became known as "Exclusive" or "Darbyite" Brethren.

Darby's circular on 26 August 1848, cutting off not only Bethesda but all assemblies who received anyone who had ever attended Bethesda, was to define the essential characteristic of "exclusivism" that he was to pursue for the rest of his life. He set it out in detail in a pamphlet he issued in 1853 entitled Separation from Evil – God's Principle of Unity. But a tension had existed since the earliest times, as set out in a letter from Anthony Norris Groves in 1836 to Darby (who was not a believer in adult baptism):

Some will not have me hold communion with the Scotts, because their views are not satisfactory about the Lord's Supper; others with you, because of your views about baptism; others with the Church of England, because of her thoughts about ministry. On my principles, I receive them all; but on the principle of witnessing against evil, I should reject them all.

For most of his life, Darby was able to hold the exclusives together, although several longtime members had seceded after accusing him of similar errors about the nature of Christ's humanity of which he had accused Benjamin Wills Newton. The Central Meeting in London (London Bridge) would communicate with the other assemblies and most difficulties were eventually smoothed over.

But shortly before he died in 1882, things started to fall apart. It all started from an initiative in 1879 of Edward Cronin, one of the Dublin founding members, that paralleled Darby's initiation of a new assembly at Plymouth thirty years before. Some members had left a failing assembly in Ryde and Cronin travelled down to break bread with them. When he reported back to London, different assemblies took differing views of his action. Though Darby was sympathetic in private he attacked him fiercely in public. By 1881 an assembly in Ramsgate had itself split over the issue and the division, over an issue not of doctrine or principle but church governance, became irrevocable.

The excluded party became known as the "Kelly Brethren", although William Kelly remained devoted to the memory of Darby and edited his collected papers. But after another division in 1885, three years after Darby's death, when a London assembly excommunicated a brother in Reading over the "standing" of a Christian, the minority in the resultant split (Stuarts) adopted a more "open" approach to fellowship, as did those who followed Grant in America.

A more serious split occurred in 1890 around the teaching of F. E. Raven of Greenwich. "The seceders from his communion falsely accused him of denying the orthodox doctrine of the union of the Divine and the human natures in the Man Christ Jesus – not indeed in a Unitarian, but in a Gnostic sense." After furious strife in which the leading opponent was William Lowe, many of the remaining assemblies in Britain stayed with Raven but those on the continent separated whilst the American assemblies were split.

=== 20th century ===
Not all of the people remaining in fellowship with Raven agreed with him and this led in 1908–9 to further splits, initiated by actions of the Glanton assembly in Northumberland over dissensions in the neighbouring Alnwick assembly. Once more assemblies had to decide which side to support and this included those as far away as Melbourne, Australia. Thus the Ravens and the Glantons were established. In the same year a festering disagreement in Tunbridge Wells led to a minor breakaway from the Lowe group by a number of assemblies.

A further division took place in 1970. By this time, James Taylor, Jr. had come to control what had been the Raven group. At a meeting in Aberdeen, Scotland, on 25 July, it was alleged Taylor's behaviour was improper. His host published a long letter of protest which was sent to the New York assembly. Taylor immediately rejected these accusations as lies and the incident definitively divided the Brethren membership worldwide. Very few based near the scene of the events stayed in fellowship with Taylor – only two families in Aberdeen and 200 out of 3,000 members in Scotland remained. Altogether, over 200 such assemblies in England, Scotland and Ireland seceded from the Taylor group, according to a 1971 listing.

Others, especially those further afield, believed Taylor's line that he was a pure man and that this incident was used by God to expose his enemies. Following this incident, those who separated from Taylor "rolled back" the changes in doctrine and practice that he had introduced, reverting to the teachings that had been followed in the time of his father, James Taylor, Sr., who had led the movement from 1905 till his death in 1953. This fellowship further fragmented in 1972, and the party which broke away has since further sub-divided.

However, the history of Exclusive Brethren is not only one of division. Eventually several of the groups realised that the divisions caused by personalities clashes or ecclesiastical issues were no longer relevant and reunions occurred. The Kelly and Lowe groups reunited in 1926 to form the Lowe-Kelly group, in 1940 with most of Tunbridge Wells and in 1974 with the Glantons and are sometimes known as Reunited Brethren. There was a further split in 2000, catalysed by tensions concerning Willem Ouweneel, one of the 'Dutch Five' in 1995. Their ageing congregations have often not been replenished, and are dwindling. Most of the Grant party merged with the Open Brethren in 1932.

Most Exclusive Brethren have traditionally been described as "Darbyite" as they adhere in the main to the original doctrines and teachings of John Darby, and do not accept the concept of a doctrine that evolves through the teachings of successive leaders. Neither do they accept the concept that teachings of church leaders are authoritative, divinely sanctioned, and binding on those in fellowship, as is the belief of the Raven/Taylor/Hales Brethren.

== Characteristics of the Exclusive Brethren ==
=== Overview ===
At one time, all Exclusive Brethren groups believed that there was a necessary unity of the local church or assembly, but some who once were in fellowship with the Raven/Taylor/Hales group have become independent companies modifying their requirements for receiving members to suit individual conscience. Amongst such groups views concerning their way of life and relationships are frequently affected by the varying standards in the general community.

This is expressed practically in different ways by the different groups, but matters of fellowship and church discipline used to be generally not merely questions of local responsibility; such decisions would have been accepted in all meetings. Exclusive Brethren were therefore sometimes described as Connexional Brethren, as they recognised an obligation to accept and adhere to the disciplinary actions of other associated assemblies. For example, where one of their branches had excluded a person from Christian fellowship, that person remained excluded from all other branches, who must then treat the excluded person as a leper (according to the book of Leviticus Chapter 15). This is still the practice amongst the Brethren and no doubt would be claimed by other independent assemblies.

There are common threads throughout all Plymouth Brethren groups, most notably the centrality of the Lord's Supper (Holy Communion) in the weekly calendar as well as the format of meetings and worship: the distinctions between the many groups are generally not well understood by non-members. The adjective exclusive has been applied to the groups by others, partially due to their determination to separate from and exclude what they believe to be evil. Exclusive Brethren usually disown any name and simply refer to themselves as Christians, Brethren, those with whom we walk, those in fellowship with us, or the saints. However, the Raven/Taylor/Hales group being the most universally identifiable has attracted the term Exclusive Brethren and accepted its application to themselves as meaning, the exclusion of, or withdrawal from, evil.

Dissecting the history and branches of the Exclusive Brethren, particularly in the 20th century, can be a challenge as there has been no formal mechanism for documenting their movement's history.

=== Beliefs and structure ===
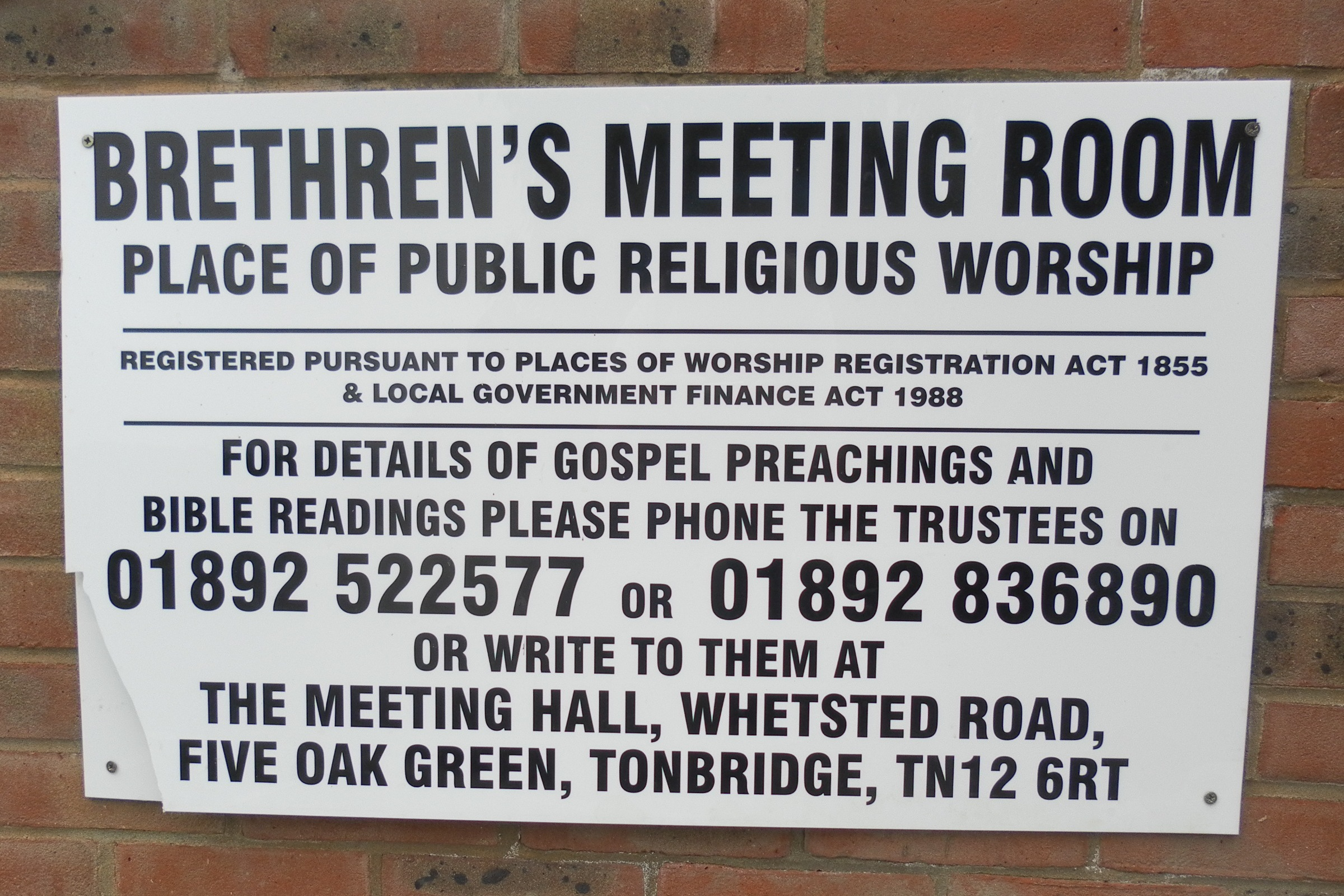
This notice indicates that the meeting room is a registered place of worship and gives contact details. (Five Oak Green Meeting Room, Kent).

With the exception of the hardline Plymouth Brethren Christian Church (PBCC), Exclusive Brethren differ very little from the Open Brethren on theological issues, both holding the Bible as their sole authority in regard to matters of doctrine and practice. Like the Exclusives, Open Brethren have traditionally based much of their doctrine on the teachings of John Nelson Darby. With few exceptions, particularly in regards to whom to accept into fellowship, Exclusive Brethren have continued to hold the same beliefs that inspired the early Plymouth Brethren.

Exclusive Brethren reject evolution, and if their children attend state schools they are withdrawn from lessons on this. They do not believe that women should have authority over men. They hold to the concept of the Rapture and the End Times. In the 1960s, the group's teachings were that members could not join trade unions or professional associations, as this was mixing too much with the world.

The centrality of the Lord's Supper (Holy Communion) is one of the primary linking threads between the different Brethren groups; however, it is also one of the primary differentiators between the various Exclusive Brethren sub-groups: there are exclusive groups which receive all professing Christians to communion, and there are exclusive groups which restrict access to communion to those who are known to be in their fellowship. The PBCC are generally regarded as having the most stringent and uncompromising views on this. However, only two of their services are closed to those who are not members in good standing, the Lord's Supper and the monthly Care Meeting, with well-disposed members of the public free to come into Gospel Preachings and other meetings.

Most Exclusive Brethren groups have no formal leadership structure. In many assemblies, matters up for debate may be discussed at special meetings attended solely by adult males called, in some groups, "Brothers Meetings". As a result, schisms can occur in the Brethren over disagreements about church discipline and whether other sister groups in other locations have authority to intervene in these disagreements. There are often global family connections due to the emphasis among members to marry within the Exclusive Brethren, and family connections often influence which side of the issue members will take. The PBCC avoid this trend by having a structured leadership with a central authority figure which has maintained unity through the upholding of a universal standard.

Some Exclusive Brethren assemblies "commend" men who are dedicated to the work of preaching. Although they usually do not receive a salary, gifts are often given to them by the separate assemblies where they preach and teach.

Exclusive Brethren do not generally name their meeting rooms or Halls except by reference perhaps to the road, e.g. Galpins Road Meeting Room, Mallow Street Hall. The meeting room or Hall is often referred to as "The Room" or "The Hall". Notice boards give the times of Gospel Preachings with a formula such as "If the Lord will, the Gospel will be preached in this room Lord's Day at 6.30." Meeting rooms of the Plymouth Brethren Christian Church, perhaps the most hardline of the Exclusive Brethren groups, have notice boards indicating that the building is a place registered for public worship and give a contact number for further information.

Unlike the Open Brethren, whose assemblies usually do not have an official membership, Exclusive Brethren are more particular about affiliation, as people who wish to break bread must be affiliated with a "local assembly" to which they are responsible in terms of lifestyle choices.

=== Worship ===
Hymns are a vital part of the worship of Exclusive Brethren. One of the unifying features in each of the different branches of the Brethren is a common hymnbook. The first collection used among the united assemblies was, "Hymns for the Poor of the Flock," from 1838 and again in 1840. Another such hymnbook, used by Exclusive Brethren (Tunbridge-Wells and Ames) dating back to 1856 is called, "Hymns and Spiritual Songs for the Little Flock," the first edition of which was compiled by G.V. Wigram.

A revision was made in 1881 by J.N. Darby. The Little Flock hymnbook has gone through many different editions in different languages. In modern times one of the more commonly used English hymn books in British and North American assemblies is The Believers' Hymn Book. Most branches of Exclusive Brethren use one of the many editions of the Little Flock Hymn Book. All editions come from the same source: J.N.Darby's hymnbook of 1881 which drew on earlier work by George V. Wigram.

Some Exclusive meetings seat accepted men (men who are "in fellowship") in the front rows toward the table bearing the emblems, with accepted women behind the men, and unaccepted men and women toward the rear. Other Exclusive meetings seat accepted men and women together (so spouses can be seated together), and unaccepted men and women towards the rear in the "Seat of the Unlearned" or "Seat of the Observer".

Brethren Women in Exclusive Brethren gatherings wear a headcovering, which is often a headscarf, shawl or mantilla, in keeping with 1 Corinthians 11.

=== Numbers ===
It is difficult to number the Exclusive Brethren, with the exception of the Raven/Taylor/Hales group, of which there are approximately 46,000 meeting in 300 church assemblies in 19 countries, with strongest representation in Australia, New Zealand, Great Britain, and North America. Other Exclusive groups now number only 2–3,000 in the UK, but there are larger numbers on the European continent and also in North America.

== Film portrayal ==
The Exclusive Hales branch of the Plymouth Brethren are portrayed in the film Son of Rambow as trying to restrict the creativity and freedom of the film's main character. The Plymouth Brethren are also featured in the book Oscar and Lucinda by Peter Carey, and in the film adaptation. Oscar is raised by a strict Plymouth Brethren father and rebels by becoming an Anglican priest.

== Criticism ==
Some have criticised the Plymouth Brethren Christian Church (PBCC), the subgroup of the Exclusive Brethren that has attracted the most media coverage, for its policy of separating itself from other orthodox Christian denominations, and because it prohibits radio and television, limits the use of computers and discourages socialising with people outside the movement.

Critics of the PBCC have accused it of using cult-like techniques by controlling all aspects of its members' lives. The group uses a technique of "withdrawing from" or shunning members who are believed to have offended. The group's control over its members is such that many who have left the group have had trouble adjusting to everyday life outside. In some cases people have killed themselves in distress. To help with this problem, several websites have been set up by ex-members to assist people who have left the church to adjust into mainstream society.

Involvement of members of the Exclusive Brethren Church in New Zealand in electioneering led to criticism in the context of the 2005 New Zealand election funding controversy. The church distributed political material criticising the New Zealand Labour Party government, and the leader of the opposition party admitted knowledge of the church's activities. From 2019 the church hired private investigators to conduct surveillance on ex-members who had criticised the church. There has been criticism of the church's practice of "shutting up."

There were indications that the Exclusive Brethren were providing support to the Liberal–National Coalition in Australia in the 2025 Australian federal election, although this was denied.

== Notable Exclusive Brethren ==
This is a list of individuals associated with various branches of the Exclusive Brethren for at least a part of their lives. It includes, but is not limited to, members of the hardline Plymouth Brethren Christian Church.

- Patricia Beer, poet
- Peter Caws, British philosopher raised Exclusive Brethren, left the sect as an adult
- Anthony Crosland, Foreign Secretary in Britain's Labour Government, raised in Plymouth Brethren
- Aleister Crowley, rejected his early PB upbringing to become an occultist
- James George Deck, evangelist and missionary to New Zealand
- John Nelson Darby, father of the modern Rapture doctrine
- L. C. R. Duncombe-Jewell, journalist and writer, raised in the Plymouth Brethren.
- John George Haigh, serial murderer
- Douglas Harding, rejected his Exclusive Brethren upbringing, became an independent spiritual teacher
- David Hendricks, convicted of killing his wife and children but acquitted in a retrial
- William John Hocking, Superintendent of the Royal Mint of the United Kingdom
- Garrison Keillor, radio personality (A Prairie Home Companion) and author; raised Exclusive Brethren; no longer associates with them
- William Kelly, leader of the Exclusive Brethren in the late 19th century
- C.H. Mackintosh, 19th-century author of Christian books
- Roger Panes, member of Exclusive Brethren who, while being "shunned" by his congregation, killed his wife and three children, before committing suicide
- Rebecca Stott, raised fourth generation in the Exclusive Brethren, professor of literature and creative writing at UEA, novelist, historian and author of the memoir In the Days of Rain about her childhood in the Brethren and her father's before her. The book was awarded the Costa Biography Prize in 2017.
- James Taylor, Jr., leader of one Exclusive Brethren branch (a.k.a. "Taylorites", now called the Plymouth Brethren Christian Church) from 1959 to 1970
- Ngaire Thomas, author of Behind Closed Doors, about her childhood abuse in the Exclusive Brethren
- George Wigram, author of a Greek and English concordance to the New Testament and The Englishman's Hebrew and Chaldee Concordance of the Old Testament

== Bibliography ==
- Bachelard, Michael (2008). Behind the Exclusive Brethren. Scribe Publications. ISBN 978-1-921372-28-5.
- J. L. C. Carson, The Heresies of the Plymouth Brethren (London, 1862) Free Download 19mb
- T. Croskery, Plymouth Brethrenism: A Refutation of its Principles and Doctrines (London, 1879)
- A. Miller, Plymouthism and the Modern Churches (Toronto, 1900)
- Neatby, William B. (1901). A history of the Plymouth Brethren . London: Hodder & Stoughton.
- Noel, Napoleon (1936). History of the Brethren. W F Knapp,Colorado.
- W. Reid, The Plymouth Brethren Unveiled and Refuted (Second edition, Edinburgh, 1874–76) Free Download 17mb
