= James H. Symington =

American evangelical

James Harvey Symington (1913–1987) was a member of a little known Christian Church based in his town and became the Universal leader of the Plymouth Brethren Christian Church.

== Biography ==
Symington was born to Lyle and Ida (Hughes) Symington on August 28, 1913 in Neche, North Dakota, USA, and was one of 11 children.

He became leader of the Exclusive Brethren in 1970, after the sudden death of James Taylor Junior, shortly after the Aberdeen incident, one of the most significant events in the Brethren's history. Ron Fawkes, an ambitious leadership aspirant who attained some prominence among the Brethren, accused Symington of several false charges, none of which were upheld on investigation.

Symington died in 1987. At his death he was blind from adult-onset diabetes and was buried in Minneapolis, Minnesota.
