= Plymouth Brethren Christian Church =

Christian sect formerly known as the Exclusive Brethren

- Classification: Protestant
- Orientation: Plymouth Brethren
- Polity: Connectional
- Leader: Bruce Hales
- Region: Australia, New Zealand, Europe, the Americas and UK
- Founder: John Nelson Darby (original Plymouth Exclusive Brethren)
- Origin: 1828 (Note: Founded as Plymouth Brethren. Became known as Exclusive Brethren in 1848. Incorporated as Plymouth Brethren (Exclusive Brethren) Christian Church Limited in 2012, then formally branded as Plymouth Brethren Christian Church Limited in 2017); Plymouth
- Separated from: Plymouth Brethren (Note: The Open Brethren and Exclusive Brethren emerged from the split.)
- Separations: Numerous schisms
- Members: Over 50,000

The Plymouth Brethren Christian Church (PBCC) is an evangelical Christian denomination in the Exclusive Brethren tradition, a branch of the Plymouth Brethren originating in the 19th century.

The PBCC has a global presence, with about 50,000 members based across Australia, New Zealand, the United Kingdom, and the Americas. Members see the Bible as their Scripture and the denomination teaches the doctrine of nonconformity to the world—aiming to live apart from what they see as the moral corruption in mainstream society.

The Brethren movement originated among evangelical Protestants in Ireland and England in the 1820s. John Nelson Darby was one of its early leaders, and the movement became associated with Plymouth after Darby began meeting there with others who had separated from the Church of England. In 1848, the movement divided into the Open Brethren and Exclusive Brethren, the latter adopting more restrictive rules concerning membership and relations with people outside the fellowship. The PBCC as it exists today took clearer shape in the mid-20th century, particularly under the leadership of James Taylor Sr and his son James Taylor Jr. It is now led by Bruce Hales, an Australian businessman based in Sydney. The group holds daily worship meetings, adheres to strict moral codes, and restricts social interaction with those outside the fellowship.

Several organisations are closely associated with the PBCC, including the Rapid Relief Team, Universal Business Team (UBT), and OneSchool Global (OSG).

== Beliefs and practices ==
A PBCC meeting hall in Albourne, UK

=== Worship, ordinances and evangelism ===
Brethren meetings are held daily, with some conducted online. Sundays are particularly active, typically including three meetings: the Lord's Supper (Holy Communion), a reading or discussion of scripture, and one or more preaching sessions. Of the ten weekly services, nine are described as 'open', meaning that well-disposed members of the public may attend. However, two meetings (the Lord's Supper and the monthly Care Meeting) are restricted to members in good standing.

In meetings, participation by members is encouraged, however women do not lead worship, preach, or pray audibly in meetings. In services, they sit separately from men. This practice reflects the group's interpretation of 1 Corinthians 14:34. They wear head coverings during worship, although outside of meetings a headband or hair clip is sometimes used as a token covering. Dress expectations for women have become more relaxed in recent years and make-up is now commonly worn. While most Brethren businesses are led by men, some women are shareholders, directors in family firms, or involved in day-to-day operations.

Gospel preaching is often conducted in public spaces, such as on street corners. While the Brethren do not actively seek converts, they view preaching as a way to share their understanding of the Christian gospel (cf. evangelism).

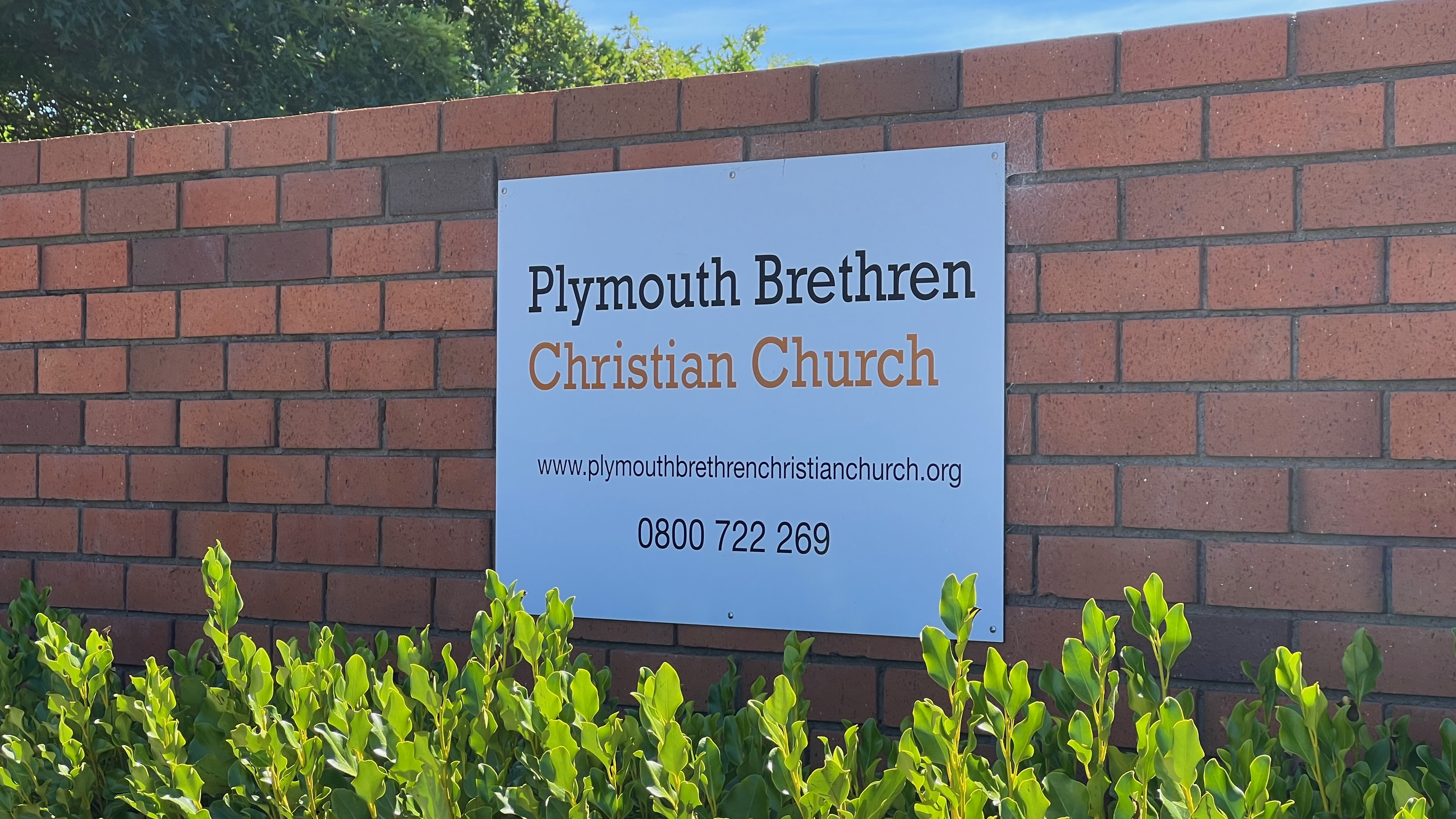
A sign outside a Plymouth Brethren building

=== Family ===
The Brethren emphasise traditional family structures. Men are expected to be the financial providers, while women typically manage the household, although in more recent years many women have their own small businesses or part-time job. Children remain in the family home until marriage and are encouraged to marry within the fellowship. Courtship is chaperoned, and physical intimacy before marriage is strongly discouraged. Elderly and unwell members are usually cared for by other Brethren families, though private nursing homes are fully used when necessary. A 2006 study of Australian Brethren suggested a divorce or separation rate of around 0.8%, compared to 10.8% in the general population at the time. As of 2006 few people outside the Brethren joined the fellowship, and relatively few born into it chose to leave.

=== Nonconformity to the world ===
The Plymouth Brethren Christian Church teaches that unity among believers is achieved through separation from what it regards as evil. The doctrine of separation has influenced the denomination's approach to social relationships, entertainment, education, business and other aspects of daily life. Members do not watch television, listen to the radio, or use the open internet for personal use, although filtered internet access is permitted for education and business purposes. The denomination has been described as a “cult” by some former members and commentators. The Church disputes the cult characterization. Academic Lorne L. Dawson, who has written about the group, has argued against the use of “cult” as a general category, and described the PBCC as "a sectarian group that is displaying cult-like features".

Brethren typically avoid social and professional affiliations outside the fellowship. This includes abstaining from clubs, professional memberships, and holding shares or directorships in outside companies. Eating out at restaurants and staying in hotels is also generally avoided. Social interaction is reserved for those within the fellowship. Specifically, those who participate in the Lord's Supper (their name for the Eucharist). Even close relatives outside the church are excluded from shared meals, entertainment, and other social gatherings. Former members report a culture of heavy alcohol use but this is disputed by the Church.

=== Ecclesiastical discipline ===
Some former members say that life inside the Brethren is defined by the "three Fs": family, finances and fear, with the most important being family.

Critics of the PBCC have accused it of controlling all aspects of its members' lives. Some former members report difficulty adjusting to life outside the Church after leaving or being excommunicated.

According to the PBCC, its disciplinary practices include 'shutting up' (temporary internal separation) and 'withdrawing from' (excommunication). The Church states that such measures are rare and only applied after sustained pastoral engagement, typically in response to conduct viewed as incompatible with biblical principles. Critics, however, argue that disciplinary actions may also be used to suppress dissent or challenge to leadership. Former members have described instances where individuals were withdrawn from for disagreeing with the church leaders. A person who is withdrawn from is typically excluded from all Church meetings and social contact with members, including family. The PBCC does not issue formal guidelines on how families should respond, and in some cases, individuals remain in contact with relatives who have left the fellowship.

In Britain, the Brethren have faced scrutiny over the alleged practice of "shutting up", in which individuals are reportedly confined at home as a form of internal discipline. In one case in 2012, six girls from Wilton Park School were allegedly confined for 37 days after creating a Facebook page. The school trust denied the claim and invited a formal investigation. The local authority and police did not find grounds to take action against the school or parents.

=== Technology ===
A significant development in the recent history of the PBCC has been its acceptance of modern technology. Historically, the group strongly discouraged devices such as radios, televisions, and personal computers. Access to the internet, mobile phones, and similar tools were restricted within the community. Beginning in the early 2000s, the group began to reconsider its position.

This shift has been studied in detail by Steve Knowles, a senior lecturer in Religious and Popular Culture at the University of Chester, who noted that prior to the 21st century, ICT was broadly denounced by PBCC leaders. Today however, members use most modern technology such as laptops, smartphones, video conferencing, the internet and even some social media platforms.

The PBCC provides a members-only smartphone app containing contact details and photographs of Brethren families worldwide, including the names of household members.

The Church launched a podcast series in 2025.

==== Streamline3 internet filtering software ====
The PBCC recommends that members use internet filtering software on members devices, particularly when devices are accessed by children. Devices sold by UBT come pre-installed with anti-virus and filtering software called Streamline3. UBT also offers a service adding Streamline3 to devices members have purchased elsewhere.

Former members say that the PBCC blocks sites it does not wish members to see, including support resources for those seeking to leave. However the PBCC stated "the Church has no control over the devices their members use, or the websites that they access". An article in The Daily Telegraph notes that the use of Streamline3 may be left to "parents' discretion". According to the Streamline3 website, device administrators can control website access and block content such as pornography to help protect users.

=== Shunning ===
Leaving the Plymouth Brethren Christian Church, whether by personal choice or excommunication, can result in significant social and practical disruption. Former members report that departure often leads to a loss of family contact, community support, or potentially employment however a Brethren spokesperson 'rejected any suggestion that ex-members were forced to quit their jobs at the request of the church or its leadership'. According to the PBCC, individuals who are withdrawn from are now followed up to ensure they are not left in financial hardship, though the group acknowledges that this has not always been the case. This claim has been disputed by former members, including in submissions made during the UK Charity Commission's 2012–2014 investigation into the Preston Down Trust.

== History ==
The early Brethren were concerned about the close ties between the Church of England and the government. They also felt that church life had become too formal, too focused on structure, and too divided into denominations.

From the start, the Plymouth Brethren rejected the idea of ordained ministers or priests, believing that all members were saints with equal standing. In practice, however, leadership did emerge. John Nelson Darby became a dominant figure in the Exclusive branch during his lifetime, and after F. E. Raven's death in 1905, James Taylor of New York gradually became his recognised successor. Taylor's influence grew, and by 1910 he was the undisputed leader of the Raven faction. Under his leadership, authority shifted to New York, and a more formal hierarchy began to develop. By 1920, when another split occurred involving 40 assemblies in Australia, the group was often referred to as the 'Taylor' or 'Raven–Taylor' Brethren.

In 1929, controversy arose when Taylor was reported to have challenged the doctrine of the eternal Sonship of Christ. He emphasised that the term "Son" did not appear in Scripture until the incarnation, citing John 1, where Christ is introduced as the "Word" rather than the "Son". This view led to further division, and in 1932 a revised edition of the Little Flock hymnbook was issued, reflecting the theological shift.

Following Taylor's death in 1953, leadership passed to his son, James Taylor Jr (1899–1970). During Taylor Jr's tenure, the movement adopted increasingly rigid standards. These included detailed prescriptions on dress, business conduct, facial hair, and education. Members were instructed not to eat with those outside the group, including family, and were discouraged or forbidden from joining professional associations. These developments led to further departures, with many individuals and assemblies leaving during the ministries of both Taylor Sr and Jr.

The most significant rupture occurred in July 1970 during meetings held in Aberdeen, Scotland, sometimes referred to as the "Aberdeen incident". During these meetings on 25 July, James Taylor Jr, then leader of the Raven–Taylor faction, rumours circulated that he was intoxicated and alleged to have engaged in inappropriate conduct with a married member of the fellowship. The incident caused a significant division within the movement, despite there being no evidence of inappropriate conduct. In Scotland, many assemblies severed ties with Taylor Jr, with reports suggesting that only two families in Aberdeen and approximately 200 out of 3,000 members in Scotland remained in fellowship with him.

Supporters of Taylor Jr defended him, asserting that he remained spiritually sound and that the events in Aberdeen were divinely permitted to test the faith and loyalty of the fellowship. One interpretation held by members was that Taylor had acted provocatively to reveal opposition within the group. Taylor Jr died later that same year. After Taylor Jr's death, leadership passed to James H. Symington, a farmer from Neche, North Dakota. Symington led the movement until his death in 1987, after which leadership transitioned to John Hales, an Australian accountant. Hales established a school for Brethren families in the Sydney suburb of Meadowbank. When he died in 2002, his son, Bruce Hales, a Sydney-based accountant, assumed leadership of the group.

In 2012, the Preston Down Trust, representing a Plymouth Brethren meeting hall in Devon, was denied charitable status by the Charity Commission, which stated it was not satisfied that the Trust's activities provided a public benefit as required under charity law. The decision drew national attention and controversy, with debates over religious freedom, public access, and transparency. Following an appeal and a period of negotiation, the Commission announced in January 2014 that it would approve the Trust's application, after legally binding undertakings were made to amend the trust deed and clarify its practices in support of public benefit.

== Business and charity activities ==
Typically Brethren either own their own business or work for a business run by another Brethren member. Their business interests span manufacturing, distribution, and sales. These include sectors such as clothing, architecture, mobility and rehabilitation aids, food supply, and the import and resale of industrial hardware like welding tools and consumables. Globally, the PBCC claims their businesses employ over 56,000 non-member staff and generate a combined turnover of A$22 billion. The PBCC does not permit trade unions. In some cases, it has opposed regulations that would allow union representatives to visit member-run workplaces.

During the COVID-19 pandemic, Sante Group and Westlab Pty Ltd, companies reportedly associated with members of the Plymouth Brethren Christian Church, were awarded government contracts in Australia and the UK to supply COVID-19 testing materials. These contracts reportedly totalled over £1 billion.

Several organisations are closely associated with the PBCC. The Rapid Relief Team, Universal Business Team (UBT), and OneSchool Global (OSG) were founded by Brethren members and are publicly listed on the Church's website, though they are not owned by the Church itself

=== Rapid Relief Team ===
The Rapid Relief Team (RRT) is a global charity run by volunteers from the PBCC. It supports emergency services and humanitarian causes, including homelessness, mental health, disability, and youth disadvantage. RRT operates in multiple countries and has received both praise and scrutiny. In Canada, its partnership with police departments raised questions about transparency and religious affiliation.

=== Universal Business Team ===
Universal Business Team is a global business consultancy and group purchasing network affiliated with members of the PBCC. It employs over 700 staff, including both Brethren and non-Brethren professionals. The organisation provides services such as business advice, training, accounting, and procurement.

UBT operates as a business support structure for PBCC-affiliated companies. By acting as a buying group, it allows participating businesses to negotiate collective purchasing deals.

UBT has also been involved in legal action. In New Zealand it initiated legal proceedings against former member Peter Harrison, alleging he had used a UBT-published directory containing PBCC member contact details without authorisation.

=== OneSchool Global ===
OneSchool Global began in the 1990s as an educational arm of the PBCC. Members of the Church run a global network of schools called OneSchool Global which educates over 8,000 children between the ages of 8 and 18. There are over 120 campuses including 38 in Australia, 43 in the UK, and 36 in North America. The school reports having "more than 2,000 staff and volunteers operating across 20 countries".

Students are discouraged from physically attending university but most undertake tertiary studies through distance learning, completing diplomas or degrees, typically focusing on accountancy, marketing or business studies rather than the arts. In the United Kingdom about 10% study for a degree.

In 2005 David Bell, the Chief Inspector of Schools in England, praised the Brethren schools for their standard of teaching and said in his report that "the quality of teaching, most of which is done by experienced practitioners, is generally good". The schools are largely staffed by non-brethren teachers. Their schools do use computers and other modern technology and their use of Zoom and Self Directed Learning enabled them to cope with the COVID-19 virus.

OneSchool Global has received significant taxpayer support in Australia.

== Political activities ==
While the PBCC has historically identified as a separatist and apolitical religious movement, its members have supported conservative political causes aligned with the church's values, particularly on social and economic issues.

This involvement has included seeking exemptions from trade union laws, compulsory voting, and legislation on moral issues such as abortion and homosexuality. In accordance with dispensational teachings, the Brethren traditionally saw no point in political engagement due to their belief in an imminent apocalyptic future. However, in recent decades, members have coordinated support for political parties and campaigns.

In 2007 the Exclusive Brethren website stated it encouraged members to work with elected officials "to express a moral viewpoint of legislation in relation to the rights of God". In recent times this has included political campaigning as detailed below.

In an interview with The Sydney Morning Herald, Daniel Hales, brother of PBCC leader Bruce Hales, explained this position: "I see it as a sin and you don't. So I'm very happy for you to vote... But to me, it's my conscience that doesn't allow me to vote".

=== Australia ===
In the mid-2000s, members of the PBCC were linked to political campaigning, including substantial donations supporting the re-election of the Prime Minister John Howard in the 2004 Australian federal election. The funding, channelled through a member-owned company, drew scrutiny from the Australian Electoral Commission and became the subject of a criminal investigation.

Members also met with senior politicians including Attorney-General Philip Ruddock and Opposition Leader Kevin Rudd. Rudd criticised the group. Prime Minister John Howard confirmed that he met with the Brethren, stating he has no problem with the group and that they are "entitled to put their views to the Government".

In 2007, the ABC's Four Corners programme investigated the PBCC's political involvement, suggesting an extensive but largely hidden history of campaigning, and alleged that church members had provided support to major political figures.

Brethren members were also associated with anti-Green Party efforts in Tasmania, prompting complaints to the Anti-Discrimination Tribunal.

Further allegations included attempts to influence local councils and oppose adult stores, sparking calls for greater transparency about political ties.

=== 2025 federal election ===
The political activities of some members of the Plymouth Brethren Christian Church (PBCC) attracted renewed attention during the 2025 Australian federal election. The Joint Standing Committee on Electoral Matters (JSCEM), which conducted an inquiry into the election, received more than 75 published submissions mentioning the PBCC and identified references to the church's presence in approximately 80 suburbs across federal electorates. The committee said it was seeking to understand the involvement of third parties in the election and their influence on the electoral process. The PBCC acknowledged that some of its members volunteered during the election but denied that the church itself participated in the campaign or coordinated their activities. In evidence to JSCEM in August 2026, church director Lloyd Grimshaw said members had participated independently and had supported parties and candidates including the Liberal Party, National Party, Australian Labor Party, One Nation and Advance. He said members had given various reasons for volunteering, including support for individual candidates, concerns about government policy and requests from friends or family. The church also denied allegations that it had funded or coordinated political activity during the election. Grimshaw told the parliamentary inquiry that the church had not donated to political candidates or parties and had not paid for or organised election-related activities undertaken by members. The PBCC's position was that political participation by individual members was undertaken in their private capacity and did not represent the church. Media reports alleged that people associated with the PBCC had participated in coordinated campaigning for Liberal candidates and that the church had funded or coordinated activities involving third parties including allegedly far-right and Neo-Nazi associated figures. The PBCC rejected these allegations. During his appearance before JSCEM, Grimshaw acknowledged that members had participated and that there had been some coordination between members, but said that such coordination had not been organised by the church. JSCEM invited representatives of the PBCC to appear at a public hearing on 21 August 2026 as part of its inquiry into the conduct of the 2025 federal election. The inquiry's interim findings examined reports concerning third-party activity at polling places, including activity associated with PBCC members, while the church disputed the characterisation of its members' participation as church-organised campaigning. As of September 2026, the JSCEM inquiry into the 2025 federal election remains ongoing.

=== Canada ===
In 2005, individuals linked to the PBCC were reported to have anonymously campaigned against a same-sex marriage bill before the Canadian Senate. Operating under the name Concerned Canadian Parents, they distributed direct-mail materials and placed a full-page ad in The Hill Times, a publication directed at Parliament Hill.

PBCC members have also been linked to funding third-party political groups, including the Canada Growth Council, which ran ads critical of Justin Trudeau and Liberal Party candidates during the 2019 Canadian federal election.

=== New Zealand ===
In the early 2000s, members of the PBCC were active in New Zealand politics, including lobbying MPs and distributing political pamphlets. During the 2005 New Zealand general election, they reportedly spent around NZ$1.2 million on anonymous mailers opposing the Labour and Green parties. Though the pamphlets did not explicitly endorse the National Party, their messaging suggested alignment.

The campaign drew public and political criticism, with then–Prime Minister Helen Clark accusing the group of spreading misinformation and hiring private investigators to monitor Labour MPs. Following the controversy, some politicians distanced themselves from the PBCC, and the episode contributed to calls for electoral finance reform.

=== Sweden ===
In 2006, the Swedish tabloid Aftonbladet reported that members of the Brethren funded an advertising campaign in support of the centre-right Alliance for Sweden. The advertisements were distributed by an agency called Nordas Sverige, reportedly set up by Swedish business owners linked to the church. The newspaper traced the operation to a UK-based company, Nordas Ltd, allegedly run by individuals also associated with the Brethren.

=== United States ===
In 2004, a group of individuals associated with the Exclusive Brethren formed the Thanksgiving 2004 Committee in Florida, which raised $530,000 for newspaper advertisements supporting the re-election campaigns of President George W. Bush and Senator Mel Martinez. According to the St. Petersburg Times, $377,262 of the funds came from a Brethren member based in London, UK. None of the funds were raised in Florida, according to filings with the Federal Election Commission.

== Legal action and secrecy ==
The PBCC has been involved in several legal cases, particularly related to defamation and copyright claims involving critics and former members.

In 1984, Dutch Open Brethren theologian Willem Ouweneel prepared a German translation of his book on the history of the Brethren movement, which included commentary on the Aberdeen incident. Members of the Brethren brought a legal complaint over the accuracy of the account. Ouweneel later issued a public retraction. According to sociologist Massimo Introvigne, Ouweneel later accepted that 'a number of documents and witness testimonies showing that most accusations against Taylor Jr had been fabricated by his opponents'.

In 1992, the Brethren filed a NZ$3.2 million defamation suit against New Zealand MP Nick Smith following his public criticism of the group during a family custody case. The case was ultimately withdrawn without payment, and the Brethren later issued an apology.

In 1997, former member Dick Wyman created an online guestbook site to help ex-members reconnect. The site evolved into exclusivebrethren.net. In 2004, the PBCC filed a defamation suit against Wyman and the site was taken offline.

A US-based website, peebsnet.com, was founded by former Brethren member Tim Twinam and later shut down following alleged copyright infringement. According to a church spokesperson in 2006, the church itself was not responsible for the action, though individuals may have acted within their legal rights to protect themselves."

== Media perception ==
The Plymouth Brethren Christian Church has been the subject of controversy and media scrutiny at various times since the 1960s. In 2007, the group appointed an official media spokesperson and began engaging more actively with the press.

In 2018 Elle magazine ran a feature by Rebecca Stott on her experience with the Church titled "What Life Is Like Growing Up In A Cult".

Several documentaries have focused on the Exclusive Brethren, including Anno Domini – Doctrine that Divides, (Note: A BBC television programme (no. LRP1383E) broadcast 26 September 1976) Inside New Zealand: Leaving the Exclusive Brethren which followed five individuals who had left the group, (Note: Aired in New Zealand on TV3 Thursday, 18 August 2005.) and Veracity: Breaking Brethren (Note: Released in Canada on 27 March 2022.) The Australian Four Corners (Australian TV program) did an episode on the Church in 2025.

The North Dakota based Forum Communications Company produced a number of podcast episodes about the Brethren as part of their The Vault series.

== Notable PBCC members ==
The following individuals were associated, at least for part of their lives, with the religious group now known as the Plymouth Brethren Christian Church.

- Anthony Crosland — senior British Labour Party politician active 1950s–1970s, raised in Plymouth Brethren
- L. C. R. Duncombe-Jewell — a British eccentric, raised in the Plymouth Brethren
- John George Haigh — British serial murderer - child of Plymouth Brethren parents
- David Hendricks — American convicted of killing his wife and children, but acquitted in a retrial
- Watchman Nee — Respected Leader in the "Little Flock" movement in China; member of the Plymouth Brethren group for 5 years
- Ngaire Thomas — New Zealand author of the book, Behind Closed Doors, about her childhood abuse in the Exclusive Brethren

== Presence ==
The Church has a major presence in Neche, North Dakota exercising significant control over the city.

In 2017 local residents in Cheshire in the United Kingdom expressed significant opposition to the PBRC's plans to build a new church in the area.

In 2025 the Brethren applied to the city of Stamford, Connecticut for permission to build a church on the site of a former country club.

=== Registration and legal structure ===
The group incorporated under the name Plymouth Brethren (Exclusive Brethren) Christian Church Limited in 2012. Since 2017 they have used the name Plymouth Brethren Christian Church. The organisation is registered as:

- A public company limited by guarantee in Australia (ACN 158 542 075)
- A private company limited by guarantee in the United Kingdom (company number 08175944)
- A limited company in New Zealand (company number 8041708)

== See also ==
- Focus Learning Trust

== Bibliography ==
- Bachelard, Michael (2008). Behind the Exclusive Brethren. Melbourne: Scribe.
- Noel, Napoleon (1936). History of the Brethren. W F Knapp,Colorado.
- Shuff, Roger (2005): Searching for the True Church: Brethren and Evangelicals in Mid-Twentieth-Century England. Paternoster Press. ISBN 1-84227-254-3
- Thomas, Ngaire: Behind Closed Doors. Auckland: Random House New Zealand Ltd. ISBN 978-1-86941-730-7
