= Electoral Finance Act 2007 =

Act of Parliament in New Zealand

New Zealand Parliament
- Enacted by: House of Representatives
- Royal assent: 19 December 2007
- Commenced: 20 December 2007
- Repealed: 17 February 2009

Legislative history
- Introduced by: Hon. Mark Burton
- Introduced: 26 July 2007
- First reading: 27 July 2007
- Second reading: 22 November 2007
- Third reading: 18 December 2007

Related legislation
- Electoral Act 1993
- Status: Repealed

The Electoral Finance Act 2007 was a controversial act in New Zealand. The Fifth Labour Government introduced the Electoral Finance Bill partly in response to the 2005 New Zealand election funding controversy, in particular to "third-party" campaigns.

The proponents of the bill generally held that such a law was required to prevent wealthy private parties from "buying elections" anonymously via advertising campaigns or other financially costly lobbying, while opponents considered it a serious restriction of civil liberties, and further regarded spending private money on political campaigning as a democratic right.

== Effect ==
The Act amended numerous areas of New Zealand electoral law, but was repealed on 17 February 2009. Principally and most controversially it regulated "third party" election campaigns

=== Third party campaigns ===
The Act made it illegal for anyone to spend more than NZ$12,000 criticising or supporting a political party or taking a position on any political matter, or more than NZ$1,000 criticising or supporting an individual member of parliament, without first registering with a state agency, the Electoral Commission.

The Bill as introduced required that unregistered third parties file statutory declarations before publishing election advertisements.

The Bill originally limited the spending of registered third parties on political advertising to $60,000, but this was later increased to $120,000 by the Select Committee.

The regulation of third parties also extends to their finances. The Act requires that third parties disclose all donations they receive over $5000. Anonymous donations that third parties receive over this level must be given to the State.

=== Regulated period ===
The Act extends the "regulated period" for election campaigning from the previous 90-day period to the period starting on 1 January of election year – from three months to around ten, depending on the timing of the election. During this period electoral advertising by candidates, political parties and third parties must follow election rules, and spending limits apply.

== Controversy ==
The Coalition for Open Government, a group that advocated for the reform of election finance law in New Zealand, opposed parts of the Bill, particularly the failure of the Bill to ban secret donations to political parties, given the strong financial disclosure requirements placed on third parties.

The broad definition of "election advertisement" came in for particular criticism. Critics, including the New Zealand Law Society, Catholic charity Caritas, and the Royal New Zealand Forest and Bird Society argued the definition will catch not just electoral speech, but almost all political speech – including things like placards at protest marches.

The parliamentary opposition, the National Party, also opposed the Bill. Political commentator Matthew Hooton argued that the Bill should not proceed, and that the Minister of Justice was a "danger to democracy". On 6 October 2007 the Free Speech Coalition was formed by prominent right-wing bloggers David Farrar and Cameron Slater, and Bernard Darnton, leader of the Libertarianz Party, to oppose the Bill. The New Zealand Anti-Vivisection Society and NORML New Zealand, and the Direct Democracy Party of New Zealand also opposed the Bill.

Criticism has also been made over the process that led to the Bill's introduction, which involved discussions only with the Labour Government's supporting parties and not the Opposition.

Political commentator Chris Trotter had harsh criticism of the detractors of the Act in several opinion pieces in The Dominion Post. On 17 August he wrote

"let's just take a deep breath and examine the rules that govern election spending in Britain and Canada (countries which, the last time I looked, were still counted among the world's leading democracies). In Britain, "third party" expenditure is capped at 5 per cent of the expenditure authorised for political parties in the 12 months prior to polling day.

In Canada the figure is 1 per cent, but applies only to the period of official campaigning. (Mr Burton is proposing a cap of 2.5 per cent or $60,000 for 10 months.) In both Britain and Canada, third parties are required to register with the official electoral regulators; both countries also restrict the contributions of foreign donors to third parties; and both require the identity of third party donors to be made public. That is how modern democracies conduct themselves.

But, in New Zealand, it is still acceptable (at least to the National Party) for those with the most money to have the most say."

=== Protests ===
On 17 November 2007 a protest in Auckland against the Bill, organised by John Boscawen, drew over 2,000 protestors. A second Auckland protest, on 1 December 2007, drew a crowd of around 5,000. Smaller protests were held in Wellington and Christchurch.

== Parliamentary process ==
=== Introduction ===
The Bill was introduced on 23 July 2007 by Minister of Justice Mark Burton, who said at its introduction "The package of reforms introduced to Parliament will help promote participation in parliamentary democracy, and aims to clean up New Zealand's electoral system and protect it from abuse."

=== Bill of Rights ===
Under section 7 of the New Zealand Bill of Rights Act 1990, the Attorney-General must advise Parliament at the introduction of a bill if that bill is inconsistent with the New Zealand Bill of Rights Act. The Crown Law Office, which undertook the review, concluded that the Bill was consistent with the Bill of Rights. The National Business Review described Crown Law's opinion as "...one of the worst, most politically expedient calls on New Zealand human rights legislation in memory."

=== First reading ===
The Bill passed its first reading on 27 July by 65 votes to 54, with the Labour, Greens, NZ First, United Future and Progressive voting in favour, and the National Party, Māori Party and independents Gordon Copeland and Taito Phillip Field voting against. ACT did not vote. The legislation was sent to the Justice and Electoral Committee for consideration, with agreement from MPs to extend the membership of the committee for consideration of the Bill to include members from almost all Parliamentary parties. The committee's report on the Bill was due by 25 January 2008.

=== Select Committee ===
Public submissions on the Bill closed on 7 September 2007. Radio New Zealand reported on 31 August that the Government had indicated it might write to the Committee indicating that it intended to make unspecified changes to the parts of the legislation dealing with third parties. This would have prevented the committee from hearing criticism of the existing provisions and allow the Government to introduce changes during the Committee of the Whole House without the public being able to make submissions on the new provisions. Then Prime Minister Helen Clark denied this.

Investigative journalist Nicky Hager, author of The Hollow Men, submitted in favour of the need for changes to New Zealand electoral law. The New Zealand Law Society, and the New Zealand Human Rights Commission submitted against the Bill.

The Select committee reported the Bill to the House of Representatives on 18 November 2007, and recommended that the Bill proceed.

Annette King, who became Minister of Justice following a Cabinet reshuffle on 31 October 2007, announced a number of changes to the Bill.

These changes included:

- Increasing the cap on total third party spending from $60,000 to $120,000;
- Increasing the cap on election advertising before they have to register under the new law from $5,000 to $12,000;
- Changing the definition of election advertising;
- Increasing the corruption penalties to $100,000 fine.

=== Second reading ===
The Bill was put to a second reading vote on 22 November 2007. It passed by 65 votes to 54, with Labour, New Zealand First, the Greens, United Future, and the Progressive Party supporting it. National, ACT, the Māori Party, and independents Gordon Copeland and Taito Phillip Field voted against it, the Māori party voting two of its four votes in favour.

=== Committee of the whole House ===
The Committee of the whole House stage began on 3 December 2007.

=== Third reading ===
The Bill passed its third reading on 18 December 2007 by 63 votes to 57, with the National Party, the Maori Party, ACT, United Future and independent MP Taito Phillip Field voting against and Labour, the Greens, New Zealand First and Progressive voting for. Independent MP Gordon Copeland did not vote.

== Royal Assent and eventual repeal ==
The Governor-General signed the Act into law on 19 December 2007. The Electoral Finance Act was repealed on 17 February 2009 by a vote in Parliament of 112 to 9. The Green Party was the only Party opposing the repeal, saying it should stay in force until a replacement Bill was prepared. National Party Justice Minister Simon Power said during debate on the repeal bill that all parties in Parliament had agreed to take part in consultations to draft replacement electoral law.

Parliament eventually passed the Electoral (Finance Reform and Advance Voting) Amendment Bill 116–5 ahead of the 2011 general election. The new law set the regulated period for election advertising as beginning two years and nine months after the previous election, banned the use of Parliamentary Service funding for electoral purposes, and increased spending and donation caps.

== See also ==
- 2005 New Zealand election funding controversy
- Campaign finance reform
- Constitution of New Zealand
- Electoral system of New Zealand

== Bibliography ==
- Geddis, Andrew (2007). Electoral Law in New Zealand: Practice and Policy. Wellington: Lexis-Nexis. ISBN 978-0-408-71836-3
- Hager, Nicky (2006). The Hollow Men: A Study in the Politics of Deception. Nelson: Craig Potton. ISBN 1-877333-62-X
