= Carola Grindea =

Romanian-born British pianist (1914–2009)

- Born: Carola Rabinovici; 29 January 1914; Piatra Neamț, Western Moldavia, Romania
- Died: 10 July 2009 (aged 95); England
- Education: National University of Music Bucharest
- Occupations: Pianist and piano teacher
- Known for: Founder of the European Piano Teachers' Association
- Spouse(s): Miron Grindea, m. 1936
- Children: 1

Carola Grindea (née Rabinovici) (29 January 1914 – 10 July 2009) was a Romanian-born British pianist and piano teacher, who established the European Piano Teachers Association (EPTA) and the International Society for Study of Tension in Performance (ISSTP). In London, she taught at the Lycée Français Charles de Gaulle and later the Guildhall School of Music and Drama and developed the Grindea Technique to encourage a balance though not relaxed body posture to eliminate muscular tension and better the performer's technique.

== Early life ==
Carola Rabinovici was born on 29 January 1914 in the Romanian city of Piatra Neamț in the province of Western Moldavia. She was of Jewish descent, and had one sister, Anna (1908–1984). Grindea was educated under the tutelage of Constanța Erbiceanu at the National University of Music Bucharest. She earned a diploma in piano and won first prize for her achievements. There, she attracted the attention of Miron Grindea, the literary journalist. The two became romantically involved and were married in 1936 and had a daughter.

== Career ==
Grindea was holidaying in Europe before the outbreak of the Second World War and she and her husband arrived in the English port town of Dover on 2 September 1939. She had the phone number of Myra Hess, the pianist, and the latter invited the couple to her house in Golders Green, London, where they learnt of the declaration of war. Grindea urged Hess not to enlist as an ambulance driver and instead establish a series of lunchtime concerts at London's National Gallery that ran during the war. She earned money by teaching and playing piano. Grindea also studied piano with Hess's teacher Tobias Matthay from 1941 to 1943, and worked for the Romanian language division of the BBC.

After the conclusion of the war, the Grindea's home was visited by a group of international writers and musicians and began tutoring pupils there. From 1950 to 1967, she taught piano at the Lycée Français Charles de Gaulle in London. The following year after she left, Grindea's enthusiasm for teaching earned her the role of a piano professor at the Guildhall School of Music and Drama. She also began a lecture series called Techniques of Piano Teaching, which was considered a revolutionary in the United Kingdom because of the prevalent attitude amongst young pianists at the time that those would could not play taught.

Halfway through her tenure at the Guildhall School of Music and Drama, she officially launched the European Piano Teachers Association (EPTA) on 27 March 1978, having gathered inspiration from teaching in the United States and entering a dialogue with piano teaching groups. The objective of EPTA is to improve teaching of piano through the holding of conferences, master classes, recitals and workshops for those musicians who were traditionally isolated. Grindea was given advice by the organising secretary and her personal friend Nannie Jamieson and the principal Allen Percival, who lent his support to the organisation.

In 1980, she established the International Society for Study of Tension in Performance (ISSTP) after she expressed concerns over the increasing number of musicians who suffered from too much anxiety and tension that caused injuries while in performance. Grindea developed a method called the Grindea Technique to encourage musicians to have a balanced though not relaxed posture with the head, neck and back in the correct alignment that eliminated muscular tension and better the performer's technique. This move saw businessmen, public speakers and actors visit Grindea at the London College of Music to be taught the technique. She edited the ISSTP Journal from 1985 to 2007, and took over the editorship of Piano Journal from 1986 to 1996 after the death of Sidney Harrison.

Concurrently, Grindea organised international conferences on health and the performing arts. She established the first music medicine practitioners course. Grindea also founded the Beethoven Piano Society of Europe in 1993 and another musical journal. On the occasion of her 80th birthday, she made a threat to establish an association for octogenarians though she desisted. On 2 November 2007, the Music Teachers National Association awarded her a "Citation of Leadership", which was collected by her daughter when Grindea was unable to attend the ceremony. The following year, Grindea published a book of interviews with musical performers, titled Great Pianists and Pedagogues. She died on 10 July 2009. Her husband predeceased her and she was survived by her daughter.
