= Little Flock hymnbook =

Collection of hymns used by the Exclusive Brethren

The Little Flock hymnbook is in common use amongst Exclusive Brethren in various editions which nevertheless derive from a common source. It exists in almost as many variations and editions as there are distinct groups of Exclusive Brethren.

== Early history ==
In 1838 (and again 1840) the Central Tract Depot published George Wigram's Hymns for the Poor of the Flock. This was followed in 1856 by his Hymns and Spiritual Songs for the Little Flock which gathered together hymns from diverse collections used among Brethren and on which all subsequent versions are based. This was revised in 1881 by John Nelson Darby, an edition which is still in print, published by Bible Truth Publishers of Addison, Illinois, USA and available from Chapter Two, etc. William Kelly revised the hymn book in 1894 and Thomas Henry Reynolds produced his edition in 1903.

== Raven/Taylor editions ==
Amongst Raven–Taylor Brethren, every new doctrinal development has been reflected in renewed activity in hymn composition in English and other European languages. Doctrinal shifts were often followed by marked re-editing of the hymns themselves to bring them into line with current ministry which often necessitated the production of a new edition. The main editions are 1903, 1932, 1951, 1962, and 1973, of which there is a Taylor/Symington (1973 Amendment) edition and a separate Kingston Bible Trust (1973 Re-Selection) edition. From the 1940s, foreign language editions were gradually brought into line with English editions so that Brethren could, where possible, sing together the same hymns in the same metre. The 1962 hymnbook thus appears in varying quality in 10 or more languages. The Swedish editions in particular have a long tradition of translating English hymns, especially gospel songs for outreach. The English editions themselves have included translations from Swedish, French, Spanish and German. Taylor/Symington/Hales Brethren use their English hymnbook universally regardless of the local language.

A new edition, Hymns and Spiritual Songs for the Flock of God, was published in New Zealand in 2001 by R.D. Church and E.J. Forrest through the Joseph Bywater Trust. This collection is based on the 1951 edition and gathers together many hymns from all the pre-existing collections, restoring hymns to their original wording where possible and adding some new compositions.

== Kelly/Lowe/Glanton editions ==
The KLG grouping have had two major hymn books since William Kelly's Hymns Selected and Revised in 1894 edition. Following the reunion of 'Kelly' (1894 users) and 'Lowe' Brethren (1881 users) in 1926, the 1928 edition was compiled by William John Hocking and is still in use by a few 'Kelly' and Open Brethren meetings. The 1978 edition followed the 1974 reunion with both 'Glanton' Brethren (1903 users) and 'Grant' Brethren (1881 users) and is used by these "reunited" Brethren. This latter book has drawn more widely from hymns in common use but does not contain hymns addressing the Holy Spirit in line with traditional Darbyite teaching. Foreign language editions have developed and continued in their own distinctive traditions.

== Gospel hymnbooks ==
Gospel hymnbooks have been produced by most branches of Exclusive Brethren. The Little Flock editions have always contained a selection of gospel hymns, but both Raven/Taylor and KLG wings of the movement have from time to time used separate (sometimes privately printed) collections of gospel hymns in the gospel and outreach meetings. Chapter Two have re-published The Evangelists' Hymnal, edited by Walter Thomas Prideaux Wolston. This book is used by some Glanton and some Open Brethren assemblies.

== Tune books ==
Little Flock Tune Books have been published in 1883, 1904, 1932, 1954, 1965, and 1979. Charles Theodore Lambert's edition of 1932 published both words and tunes with an appendix "Containing a few hymns suitable for the Christian Household". It is still published in Tonic Sol-Fa by the Symington/Hales Depot. The other Tune Books had tunes only, listed in metrical order. The KLG 1978 hymn book and the Gospel Hymn Book were both published with a music edition. All editions (but especially the 1965 edition) have drawn on Exclusive Brethren tunewriters and musicians to produce collections of a high calibre both in terms of musical editing and in the quality of the compositions themselves. Composers of note include Thomas Willey, T. Collins, Miss Marian La Thangue, Miss S.M. Walker, Charles Leflaive, C.T. Lambert, Benjamin Christiansen, R.A. Evershed, Peter S. Pope, Eric Carrén, John F. Harvey, and Gordon Millar.

== Historical and critical apparatus ==
An Access database of all first lines and metres of hymns with limited biographical and bibliographical material is held at the Christian Brethren Archive in the John Rylands University Library, Manchester.

Gordon Rainbow has collated some historical material on the Little Flock Hymnbook. This contains links to all the prefaces to the early hymnbooks and from 1903 follows the Raven/Taylor line of hymnbooks. Various accounts of new editions of the hymnbook were published and these are given in full.

An account of all the major developments in the tradition was published in Frank Wallace's The History of the Little Flock Hymnbook (it does maintain an anti-Taylor bias). Also by Frank Wallace, Spiritual Songsters contains biographies of many hymnwriters found in the Little Flock tradition and is published by Chapter Two.

Adrian Roach wrote a History of the 1881 edition containing much biographical information on the hymnwriters. It is published by Bible Truth Publishers. From the same publisher, lyrics and audio of many of the hymns are freely available at BTP's Little Flock section.

Edwin O.P. Mutton compiled a History of the "Little Flock Hymn Book" and its Authors, containing biographical information on all authors 1856–1962, and a historical section covering details of revisions of the same time period. It is published by Saville Street Distribution, and is also available at Bibles-Etc. It was initially printed in 2018, and revised in October 2020.

A text of the 1978 Kelly/Lowe/Glanton edition is available online where there is a large amount of biographical material and a first line index of the 1881 "Darby" edition.

== List of English editions ==
Title	Date	Location	Compiler/Editor	Publisher	Number of Hymns	Used by
Hymns for the Poor of the Flock	1839	London	George Wigram	Central Tract Depot		Plymouth Brethren
Hymns for the Poor of the Flock	1840	London	George Wigram	Central Tract Depot, Warwick Square	377 + 73 + 40	Plymouth Brethren
A Few Hymns and Some Spiritual Songs. Selected ... for the Little Flock	1856	London	George Wigram	G Morrish, Paternoster Row	340	Exclusive Brethren
A Few Hymns and Some Spiritual Songs. Selected ... for the Little Flock, Revised	1881	London	John Nelson Darby	G Morrish, Paternoster Sq	341 + 85	Exclusive Brethren & Tunbridge Wells Brethren
Hymns Selected and Revised	1894		William Kelly			Kelly Brethren
A Few Hymns and Spiritual Songs. Selected ... for the Little Flock, Re-arranged and Further Revised	1903	London	Thomas Henry Reynolds		402	London/Raven Brethren & Glanton Brethren
Hymns Selected and Revised	1922 [Amended Edition]	London	F.E. Race	C.A. Hammond Trust		Kelly Brethren
Hymns Selected and Revised	1928	London	William John Hocking	C.A. Hammond Trust Bible Depot	436	Kelly/Lowe Brethren
Hymns and Spiritual Songs for the Little Flock	1932	London	James Taylor Snr & 9 others	Stow Hill Bible and Tract Depot	382	Raven/Taylor Brethren
Hymns and Spiritual Songs for the Little Flock	Revised 1951	Kingston upon Thames	A.E. Myles	Stow Hill Bible and Tract Depot	480	Raven/Taylor Brethren/Pre Aberdeen "Outs"
Hymns and Spiritual Songs	Selected 1958	Manchester	James MacDonald		400	Anti-Taylor Raven Brethren
Hymns and Spiritual Songs for the Little Flock.	Revised 1962	Kingston upon Thames	James Taylor Jnr	Stow Hill Bible and Tract Depot	456	Taylor Brethren/Renton Brethren
Hymns and Spiritual Songs for the Little Flock	Reselected 1973	Lancing	Robert Stott	Kingston Bible Trust	480	Frost/London/Oxted Brethren
Hymns and Spiritual Songs for the Little Flock	Amended 1973	Kingston upon Thames		Bible and Gospel Trust	417	Taylor/Symington Brethren
A Few Hymns and Spiritual Songs for the Last Days	Compiled 1974	Horsham, Sussex	J.F. Trussler		401	Hamilton Brethren
Psalms and Hymns and Spiritual Songs	Selected 1978	Wooler, Northumberland		Central Bible Hammond Trust	500	Kelly/Lowe/Glanton ("Reunited") Brethren
Supplement to Hymns and Spiritual Songs for the Little Flock	Additions 1984	Lancing		Kingston Bible Trust	22	Frost/London/Oxted Brethren
The Companion Hymn Book	1997	Croydon	G Bacon, A Sheldrake	The Whytecliffe Trust	95	Oxted Brethren
Hymns and Spiritual Songs for the Little Flock	Amended 1990	Hounslow		Bible and Gospel Trust	420	Taylor/Symington/Hales Brethren
Hymns and Spiritual Songs for the Flock of God	2001	Auckland, New Zealand	R D Church, E J Forrest	The Joseph Bywater Trust	633	Raven/Taylor Brethren

== Scandinavian editions ==
Language	Title	Year	Location	Compiler/Editor	Publisher/Printer	Number of Hymns	Used by
	Psalmer og Lovsanger for Guds Forsamling	1877					Exclusive Brethren
sv	Tros-Sånger, 1^{st} ed.	1878	Göteborg		Anonymous	75	Exclusive Brethren / Hedman tradition
	Psalmer og Lovsanger for Guds Forsamling	1879					Exclusive Brethren
sv	Tros-Sånger för Guds Församling, 2^{nd} ed.	1884	Göteborg		A.B. Petersons Förlag	159	Exclusive Brethren / Hedman tradition
da	Psalmer og Lovsanger for Guds Forsamling	1892	København		Norrebros Bogtrykkeri	130	Exclusive Brethren
sv	Tros-Sånger, 3^{rd} ed.	1895	Göteborg		A.B. Petersons Förlag	193	Exclusive Brethren / Hedman tradition
	Psalmer og Lovsanger for Guds Forsamling	1901					Exclusive Brethren
sv	Tros-Sånger, 4^{th} ed.	1907	Göteborg		A.B. Petersons Förlag	218	Exclusive Brethren / Hedman tradition
	Psalmer og Lovsanger for Guds Forsamling	1914					Exclusive Brethren
sv	Tros-Sånger, 5^{th} ed.	1916	Göteborg		A.B. Petersons Förlag	255	Exclusive Brethren / Hedman tradition
sv	Psalmer och Lovsånger	1939	Göteborg		A.B. Petersons Förlag	315 + 89	Raven/Taylor Brethren
	Psalmer og Lovsanger for Guds Forsamling	1949					Exclusive Brethren
sv	Psalmer och Lovsånger	1955	Göteborg	Eric Carrén	A.B. Petersons Förlag	480	Raven/Taylor Brethren
	Psalmer og Lovsanger for Guds Forsamling	1952					Exclusive Brethren
sv	Lovsånger och andliga Sånger för den Lilla Hjorden	1962	Göteborg		A B Petersons Förlag	456	Raven/Taylor Brethren
no	Lovsanger og Åndelige Viser for den Lille Hjord	1962	Drøbuk		OB Hansens Bogtrykkeri	456	Raven/Taylor Brethren
da	Salmer og Lovsange for den Lille Hjord	1962				456	Raven/Taylor Brethren

== Spanish editions ==
Title	Edition/Date	Location	Compiler/Editor	Publisher	Number of Hymns	Used by
Himnos Y Canciones Espirituales para la manada pequeña	1937					Raven/Taylor Brethren
Himnos Y Canciones Espirituales para la manada pequeña	1958	Rosario, Argentina		Deposito de Biblias y tratados Darragueira	480	Raven/Taylor Brethren
Himnos Y Canciones Espirituales para el Pequeño Rebaño	1962	Buenos Aires		Reuniones Evangélicas	456	Raven/Taylor Brethren

== German editions ==
Title	Edition/Date	Location	Compiler/Editor	Publisher/printer	Number of Hymns	Used by
Geistliche Lieder und Gesänge	1899	Altenvoerde	Christian Schatz	Verlag Christlicher Schriften. Printer: Oscar Brandstetter, Leipzig	170 + music	Raven Brethren
Geistliche Lieder und Gesänge	1909	Hildesheim	Richard Arras	August Mann	188 + music	Raven/Taylor Brethren and Raven/Glanton Brethren
Geistliche Lieder und Gesänge	1921	Hildesheim (Germany), Interlaken (Switzerland)		August Mann (Germany) / Adolf Steiner (Switzerland)	200 (text only)	Glanton Brethren
Geistliche Lieder und Gesänge	1922	Leipzig	Richard Arras	F H Rückbrodt	196 (text only)	Raven/Taylor Brethren
Geistliche Lieder und Gesänge	1926	Leipzig	Richard Arras	F H Rückbrodt	209 + music	Raven/Taylor Brethren
Geistliche Lieder und Gesänge	1934	Leipzig	Richard Arras	F H Rückbrodt	227 (text only)	Raven/Taylor Brethren
Geistliche Lieder und Gesänge	1936	Leipzig	Richard Arras	F H Rückbrodt	227 + music	Raven/Taylor Brethren
Geistliche Lieder und Gesänge	1948 reprint + Appendix	Leipzig		F H Rückbrodt	227 + 65	Raven/Taylor Brethren
Loblieder und Geistliche Lieder für die kleine Herde	1951	Leipzig	Alfred Wellershaus, Wermelskirchen	F H Rückbrodt	480	Raven/Taylor Brethren
Geistliche Lieder und Gesänge	1952	Interlaken	(Richard Arras)	F. A. Burri	204 + music	(Little?) Glanton Brethren
Loblieder und Geistliche Lieder für die kleine Herde	1962	Kingston upon Thames		Kingston Bible Trust	456	Raven/Taylor Brethren
Loblieder und Geistliche Lieder	1997		Probably Waldemar Schubert		849	Raven/Taylor Brethren (rejecting J. Taylor jun. and his followers)

== See also ==
- List of English-language hymnals by denomination

== Notes and references ==
- STEM Publishing has the 1881 edition available online, with words and music.
