= Bachelard =

Bachelard is a surname. Notable people with the surname include:

- Gaston Bachelard (1884–1962), French philosopher
- Michael Bachelard (born 1968), Australian journalist and author
