= Behind the Exclusive Brethren =

2008 non-fiction book by Michael Bachelard

- Book cover
- Author: Michael Bachelard
- Language: English
- Subject: Exclusive Brethren
- Genre: Non-fiction
- Publisher: Scribe Publications Pty Ltd.
- Publication date: 2008
- Publication place: Australia
- Pages: 288
- ISBN: 1-921372-28-1
- OCLC: 261340893
- Preceded by: The Great Land Grab

Behind the Exclusive Brethren: Politics Persuasion and Persecution is a non-fiction book by journalist and author Michael Bachelard about the Exclusive Brethren, focusing on the sect in Australia currently known as Plymouth Brethren Christian Church. It was published in 2008 by Scribe Publications Pty Ltd. Bachelard first became interested in the organisation while a journalist for The Age, after finding out that prior to the 2007 Australian federal election the Exclusive Brethren organisation in Australia had close access to John Howard. He spent two years researching the group, focusing on its history, influence in Australia, and ties to the Liberal Party of Australia and to Howard. The book gives a historical background of the group's origins 200 years ago in Ireland under John Nelson Darby. Since 2002, Bruce Hales served as the international leader and "Elect Vessel" of the organisation, which has 15,000 members in Australia and 43,000 total globally. The author describes the beliefs and practices and doctrine of the organisation, including some of its more controversial methodology including excommunication of former members from their family still within the group. Daniel Hales, brother of the organisation's worldwide leader Bruce Hales, described the book as part of a trend of what he said were lies told about his group by critics and disaffected former members.

The book was a bestseller in Australia, and in November 2008 it hit number 8 on a list of top ten best-selling books in the country in political and social science books according to data from Nielsen BookScan. The book received positive reception in books reviews and media coverage. The Sunday Age called it a "sober" and "well-argued" expose. The Sydney Morning Herald, called the book an "exhaustive study of the Exclusive Brethren in Australia". GayNZ.com characterised Behind the Exclusive Brethren as a "comprehensive reference work on the sect". Media/Culture Reviews noted, "The expose is written in a calm, clear style and the chapters relating to the broken families are deeply moving and respectful."

== Author ==
At the time of the book's publication, Bachelard was a journalist for The Age newspaper. He began investigating the organisation in his capacity as a newspaper journalist. Bachelard's first book The Great Land Grab discussed the Wik and Mabo cases, and was first published in 1997. Bachelard became an investigative journalist with The Age in 2006, and wrote about conditions in the workplace. In April 2008, he became a senior reporter for The Sunday Age. Bachelard received Melbourne Press Club Quill Award for Best News Report in 2008, for his reporting on WorkChoices. After discovering that prior to the 2007 election the Exclusive Brethren organisation in Australia had close access to John Howard, Bachelard became interested in writing a book about the group. He researched the organisation's history, and focused on the version of the group in Australia; analysing its ties to the Liberal Party of Australia and to Howard. He spent over two years researching the organisation.

== Contents ==
Bachelard discusses the Australian branch of the Exclusive Brethren, a movement formed approximately 200 years ago by John Nelson Darby of Ireland. The introduction emphasises the point that intense investigation should not be seen as vilification of the organisation. He writes that since the organisation's beginnings in Ireland in 1827, it has maintained that the world external to the group is evil, and has kept a "doctrine of separation" from non-members. Since 2002, Bruce Hales served as the international leader and "Elect Vessel" of the organisation, which has 15,000 members in Australia and 43,000 total globally. The author describes the beliefs and practices and doctrine of the organisation, including its approaches to business and finance, as well as its methodology with respect to charity, Sunday services, and preparing the dead for burial. Bachelard asserts that the group had "elements of cultishness", but had recently reduced its standards of stringency.

According to the book, wives are deemed second-class citizens within the organisation, and cannot hold positions higher than administrative jobs at companies owned by the group. The book describes the story of the treatment of Alison Alderton, an 85-year-old woman who was excommunicated from the organisation. For twenty years, Alderton did not see four of her six children after she had been excommunicated by the organisation. During the 1980s, Alderton and her husband Bob had served within the organisation as senior figures at the group's location in Bathurst, New South Wales. The author quotes former Family Court chief justice Alastair Nicholson, who had said that methods used by the organisation to excommunicate family members were "abusive ... psychologically it's very damaging to the child".

The author publicises a letter in the book that was written by the organisation in 2004 to Brendan Nelson, the former minister for education in Australia. According to the letter, a survey of membership within the organisation found that individuals were in the "middle to upper levels of the socio-economic group", over the last few decades. Bachelard writes, "Any funding system which delivers poverty-level funding to a group that boasts of its average wealth, needs to be reviewed." Behind the Exclusive Brethren describes how the organisation paid a private detective in New Zealand to put forth information claiming that the husband of politician Helen Clark was homosexual. The book details methods of social control used by the organisation, including the usage of exclusion from the group as a threat used to police members.

The book reveals that members of the organisation had attempted to donate funds to the 2007 re-election campaign of Prime Minister of Australia John Howard in a way in which information about the financing would not have been available to the general public. Individuals describing themselves as a "private group" had met with a senior figure within the Liberal Party of Australia in a hotel in Sydney, and offered him a significant amount of money by way of an anonymous donation. The book's source recounted the events: "They said 'We are a private group'. I asked them if they voted. It was a testing question. They said they didn't. It was a very short discussion." The organisation's members are instructed that government is controlled by God, and they are told not to vote in elections. "We're in the business of ideas and so are the Exclusive Brethren. I regard many of the party's views and those of the Exclusive Brethren as inconsistent. What the [Liberal] Party stands for should not be confused in the mind of the electorate by the acceptance of donations from fringe groups. In my view, if you accept this money, you're arguably accepting some of their opinions," said the book's source, explaining that he had turned down the offer of funds from the organisation.

== Response by organisation ==
Daniel Hales, brother of the organisation's worldwide leader Bruce Hales, described the book as part of a trend of what he said were lies told about his group by critics and disaffected former members. He said such criticism showed it is "open season to kill us". "We're happy to live our lives in anonymity, just quietly in our neighbourhoods in our low-key way. We're quite happy to have our beliefs questioned, ethically debated, and points of religion looked at. That's not a problem. We don't mind being criticised. We don't even mind being despised because of it. But once it starts to be charged that we're acting criminally, we're acting illegally, we're acting immorally, we're acting against society, then we felt that we really had to put our point of view. We felt that it wasn't fair to our members," said Daniel Hales to The West Australian.

== Reception ==
In November 2008, the book hit number 8 on a list compiled by Nielsen BookScan of the top 10 political and social science bestsellers in Australia. The author was a featured presenter on the topic of his book, at the 2009 Sydney Writers' Festival.

"This is a very fair assessment of the modus operandi of an influential Christian sect."

— The Sydney Morning Herald

The Daily Telegraph noted that the book investigates, "One of the world's most mysterious religious sects, little is known of the origins, intentions and beliefs of the Brethren, seen as increasingly powerful in Australian politics." Writing in The Sunday Age, Lucy Sussex described the book as "one of the most sober and well-argued exposes I have ever read." Shelley McInnis reviewed the book for The Age, and commented, "Michael Bachelard is brave to investigate the Exclusive Brethren sect". McInnis elaborated, "The Exclusive Brethren is a conservative Christian sect with a scrappy, pit-bull attitude towards the outside world, and Michael Bachelard is courageous for investigating it. The award-winning Sunday Age journalist has received a number of legal threats from the sect since he began reporting on it for The Age". McInnis described the author's work as that of "a scrupulous reporter".

Bruce Elder reviewed the book for The Sydney Morning Herald, and described it as an "exhaustive study of the Exclusive Brethren in Australia". Elder concluded, "This is a very fair assessment of the modus operandi of an influential Christian sect." Craig Young reviewed the book for GayNZ.com, and called Behind the Exclusive Brethren a "comprehensive reference work on the sect", and a "most incisive book". In her review of the book for Media/Culture Reviews, Sandra Hogan wrote, "Bachelard has done his research very thoroughly. He has interviewed both sides of the story: people who left the Exclusive Brethren or were expelled from them and also, as much as possible, the current leaders of the group. He has witnessed Brethren documentation, and has spoken to politicians from major and minor parties as well as to lawyers and judges. The expose is written in a calm, clear style and the chapters relating to the broken families are deeply moving and respectful."

== See also ==
- Edmund Hamer Broadbent
- Evangelicalism
- Exclusive Brethren
- Gospel Hall Assemblies
- The Local Church (affiliation)
- Needed Truth Brethren
- Open Brethren
- Plymouth Brethren
- Raven-Taylor-Hales Brethren
- William Kelly (Bible scholar)
