= Peter Pope (composer) =

British composer

Peter Searson Pope (25 March 1917 – 27 November 1991) was a British composer.

== Biography ==
Peter Pope was born in London in 1917 and was educated at Uppingham School and at the Royal College of Music, where he studied composition with John Ireland and R.O. Morris, singing with Freda Swain and piano with Cyril Smith. In 1939 he won the Octavia Traveling Scholarship to study composition with Nadia Boulanger at the American Conservatoire in Fontainebleau, Paris and it was clear from subsequent documentation that he was one of her inner circle of favoured students. His studies were, however, cut short by the German invasion of Paris in 1940 and, when Nadia Boulanger emigrated to the United States, he had to flee across France, returning to England on a Spanish trawler. He later saw service in the Royal Army Medical Corps and was attached to the 8th Army as it advanced from North Africa through Sicily and Italy.

After the war he composed several chamber works and his major break came in April 1948 when a piano quartet of his was performed at Wigmore Hall. It was favourably reviewed by William Mann, then assistant music critic of The Times, who opined that the new composer's work would be 'watched with expectancy.' Subsequently, Augener, the music publisher, offered to publish anything he wrote, but to the great disappointment of his music friends, the new composer turned down the offer and joined an exclusive religious sect, The Brethren, which prohibited any involvement with the creative arts. Whilst among the Brethren, he composed very fine hymn tunes for hymns in the Little Flock Hymn Book some of which were published in the Little Flock Tune Book Supplement, 1965.

Pope left the sect in 1971 but was never in a position to re-launch his nascent career. He did however continue to compose prolifically and to this period belong several exquisite song cycles, a Communion Service dedicated to the choir of Liverpool Cathedral, several piano sonatas and works for flute, clarinet, violin, cello and saxophone.

He died in 1991 leaving a large corpus of unpublished and relatively unknown music.

== Selected recordings ==
- Heaven-Haven: The Songs of Peter Pope Susan Legg, mezzo-soprano and Ann Martin-Davis, piano - Nimbus Alliance NI6135
