= Roger Panes =

British murderer (1933–1974)

Roger Panes (1933 – 4 March 1974) was a British member of the Exclusive branch of the Plymouth Brethren. In 1974 he killed his wife and three children with an axe before hanging himself.

== Life ==
Panes was a cattle dealer in Andover, Hampshire. In November 1973 he was "shut up," or shunned, by the other members of his church, for wrongfully shunning another member. This is a form of 'discipline' promulgated by James Taylor Jnr. and James Symington, leaders of the sect. His family were required to shun him and he was not allowed to sleep with his wife or eat with the family.

In February 1974, Panes was taken to hospital having taken an overdose of tablets, due to the stress of his situation. He recovered, but, on 4 March 1974, he killed his wife Pamela, 39, his two sons Graham, 7, and Adrian, 4, and his daughter Angela, 6, as they slept in their beds. An axe was found covered in blood. He then hanged himself from the stair bannisters with an electrical cable.

A note was also found in the house:

There's never been such a wicked man. This house will have to be left empty or bulldozed. You go to the Brethren. I trust they will take you in. Cry to God for mercy for you all and the dear children. The Lord is coming very soon.

An inquest was held and a jury decided that Panes had killed his family while the "balance of his mind was disturbed."

== See also ==
- David Hendricks – member of the Exclusive Brethren convicted and then acquitted of murdering his wife and three children.
