= James Jamieson (dentist) =

Scottish dentist and author

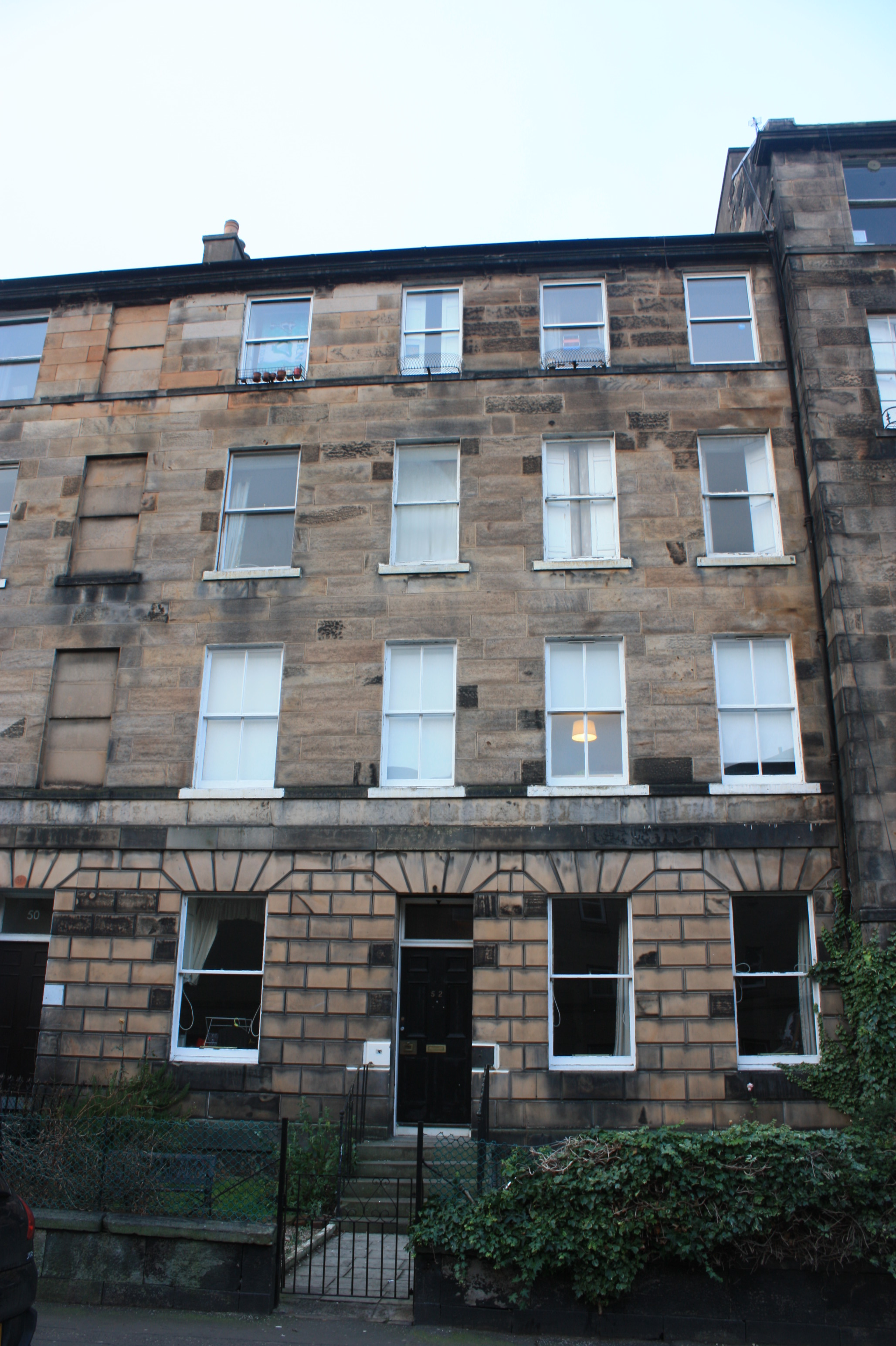
Jamieson's birthplace, 52 Rankeillor Street, Edinburgh

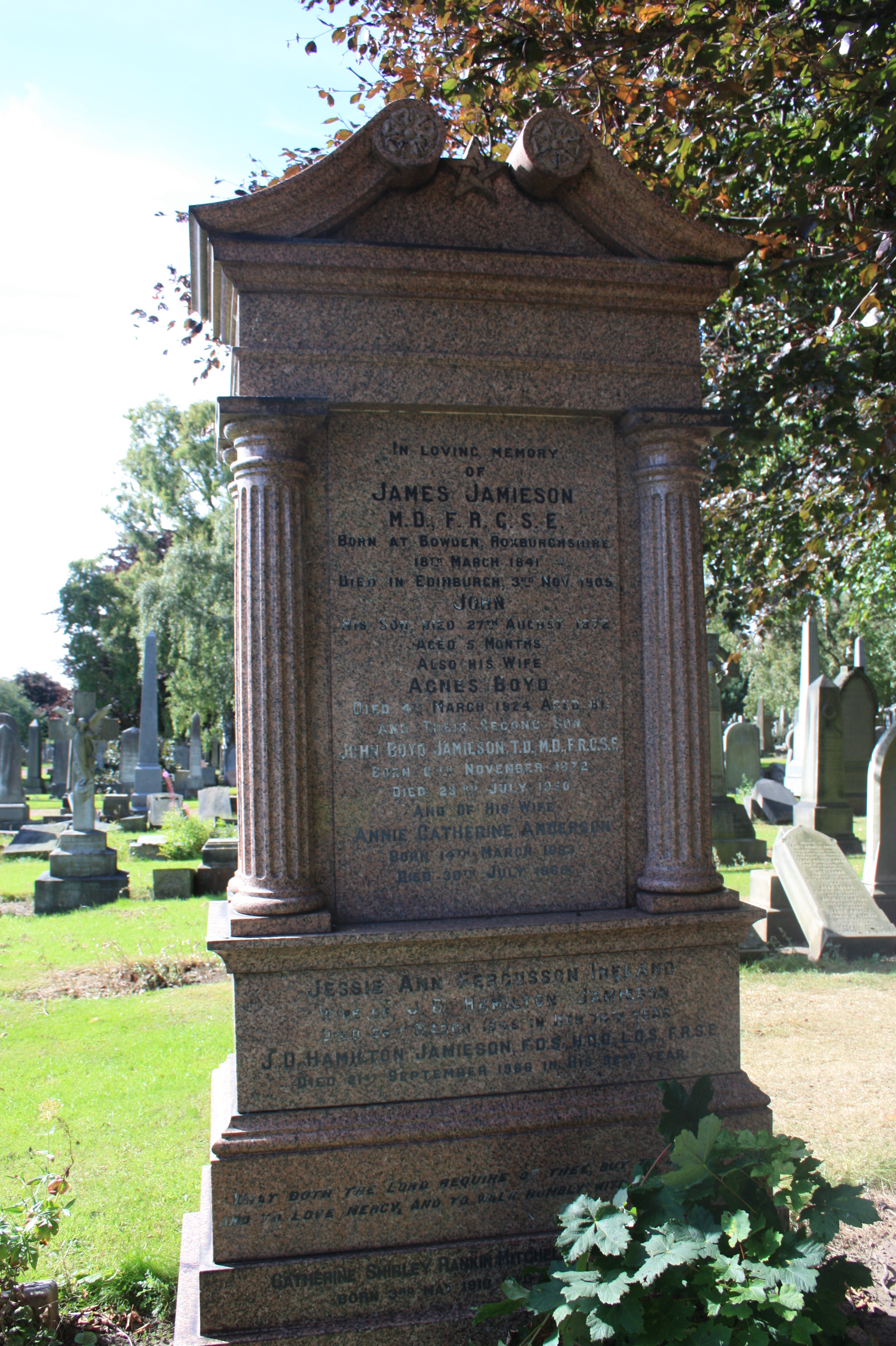
The grave of James Jamieson, Grange Cemetery, Edinburgh

James Dalgleish Hamilton Jamieson FRSE FDSE (10 September 1875 – 21 September 1966) was a Scottish dentist and author.

== Life ==
He was born on 10 September 1875 at 52 Rankeillor Street, a ground floor and basement flat in Edinburgh’s South Side, the son of Agnes Boyd and her husband, James Jamieson (1841-1905), a surgeon. He was educated at George Watsons College. He then studied dentistry at the University of Edinburgh, graduating in 1899, gaining his licence as a dental surgeon (LDS). He received his Higher Dental Diploma (HDD) from The Royal College of Surgeons of Edinburgh in 1920.

From 1899 to 1955, he practiced as a dental surgeon, living at various addresses in George Square, in Edinburgh’s South Side. Much of George Square was demolished by the University of Edinburgh in the 1960s, however, number 58 where Jamieson lived in the 30s and 40s, and number 29, where Jamieson lived in the 1950s, and is now the home of the School of Scottish Studies Archives, are still standing. He also had a summer residence, The Knowe, at Bowden in Roxburghshire.

From 1931 until 1951 Jamieson lectured in dental disorders at the University of Edinburgh.

In 1938 he was elected a Fellow of the Royal Society of Edinburgh. His proposers were Francis Albert Eley Crew, Charles Henry O'Donoghue, Edwin Bramwell, and John Walton.

He died at New Malden in Surrey on 21 September 1966 aged 91. He was returned to Edinburgh for burial in the family plot in the south-east section of Grange Cemetery in Edinburgh.

== Family ==
He married Jessie Ann Fergusson Ireland, a singer, in 1903 and had two daughters, Agnes (Nannie) Jessie Hamilton and Hilda Patricia Hamilton.

Jamieson was a keen amateur violinist and often performed with his family at their summer residence, The Knowe, in Bowden.

In 1956, aged 80, he moved to New Malden, Surrey, to live with his daughter Nannie Jamieson,his wife having died in 1949.

== Publications ==
- Aids to Operative Dentistry (1923)
- Ham and jam: Days, doings, diversions, drawings and doggerel ditties of a dentist (1960), memoir
