= 2005 New Zealand election funding controversy =

The 2005 New Zealand election funding controversy occurred in the aftermath of the 2005 New Zealand general election.

Under New Zealand's political system, parties may only spend, during the 90 days before the election, up to a certain amount on campaigning (excluding broadcasting). They must raise that money from their own sources. Other funds are available through the Parliamentary Service to members of Parliament for "parliamentary purposes", which may include advertising but not "electioneering material". Following the 2005 election, there was widespread debate as most parties had breached either election or parliamentary spending rules in some respect.

== Election spending allegations ==
=== Labour ===
Labour and five other political parties were investigated for alleged breaches of election spending rules relating to the 2005 election. The Electoral Commission, the independent body charged with supervising compliance with campaign rules, referred the Labour Party to the police after finding that they had overspent by over $400,000. Labour's election campaign included the production, using Parliamentary Service funds, of a "pledge card". The party had wanted to exclude the $446,000 it spent on the pledge cards from its campaign expenses, but the Electoral Commission ruled the pledge cards should be included. The police found that "there was insufficient evidence to indicate that an offence under s214b of the Electoral Act had been committed." While police considered "there was sufficient evidence to establish a prima facie case" of an offence under section 221 of the act (which requires a party secretary to authorise party advertising in writing), they decided not to lay a prosecution, preferring instead to warn Labour that similar future offences would risk prosecution, because it was not clear that the offence was intentional. They said a number of other parties had also used similar tactics and it would have been unfair to single Labour out.

=== National ===
National was left owing a number of broadcasters $112,500 after spending its broadcasting allowance without accounting for GST. National argued that "due to a misunderstanding between the Party and its advertising booking agency, the agency booked advertising for National on radio and television for the campaign totalling $900,000 excluding GST, instead of $900,000 including GST". Police were not able to attribute responsibility for the mistaken GST over-expenditure to either the NZ National Party or to the Party's media buying agency and did not charge either.

Labour criticised the use by the National Party of trust funds to facilitate large anonymous donations, alleging American multi-millionaire Julian Robertson as a contributor. Robertson, a friend of National leader Don Brash, had connections to the Republican Party in the US. However, National Party campaign manager Steven Joyce stated, "It is possible that [Mr Robertson] made an anonymous donation. It is also possible that he may have given to one of the trusts that periodically makes donations to us but again I have no knowledge of that. They don't tell me who gives the money so I don't know." Spending outside of campaign funding limits is permitted up to three months before election date.

Labour also criticised Brash's use of the parliamentary leader's fund (also supplied through Parliamentary Services) to pay for his advisor, Bryan Sinclair, alleging he was an election strategist.

== Auditor-General report ==
The Auditor-General investigated publicly funded party advertising for the 2005 election, with a preliminary finding that much of the spending was unlawful being leaked. A final report was released on 12 October 2006. It found that $1.17 million had been improperly spent, as follows:

- Labour Party: $768,000
- New Zealand First $150,400
- Green Party $80,900
- United Future $63,800
- ACT $17,800
- National Party $11,300
- Māori Party $48

After a draft of the Auditor-General's report was leaked, the National Party repaid the amount that the report said was spent by it unlawfully. Labour strategist Pete Hodgson said on 13 September 2006 that his party would not be repaying any money, and the Government might introduce legislation to legalise the spending.

The Speaker of the House, who has responsibility for the Parliamentary Service, sought a legal opinion in response to the Auditor General's report. While she did not agree with the legal analysis of the Auditor General, the Speaker, Margaret Wilson, recommended that legislation be passed to retrospectively validate expenditure, that parties should pay back their overspending, not as a legal obligation, but in order to maintain the confidence of the public, that the administrative processes of Parliamentary Services should be reviewed, and that legislation be developed to clarify the law on expenditure.

The Labour Party announced immediately after the report was published that it would repay the money it owed. Helen Clark said "Labour strongly maintains that it spent its parliamentary budget within the rules as they were understood at the time, and in the same way as other parties have over a long period of time. Given the Auditor-General’s new ruling, however, Labour will refund the spending identified".

== Minor parties ==
The Progressive Party was the only party found by the Auditor General not to have misspent parliamentary funding. All the other parties except New Zealand First repaid their misspent funding.

The Māori Party stated in September 2006 that during the election campaign an anonymous donor offered them $250,000 on the condition that they backed a Labour-led government after the election. The offer was not accepted. Labour denied any knowledge of the offer, and both Labour and National suggested holding an inquiry into the offer. A spokesman for the Electoral Commission said the offer did not break any provisions of the Electoral Act, but Auckland University law professor Bill Hodge considered that it may fall within the Crimes Act definition of bribery and corruption.

== Third party campaigning ==
Shortly before the 2005 election, anti-Labour and anti-Greens pamphlets were distributed to a large number of New Zealand mailboxes. Unlike party advertising, the pamphlets' origins were not made explicit. In particular they criticised Green party policy, claiming that the Greens' policies were "reminiscent...of communists" and the Greens planned to "disarm our forces", terms which the Greens considered to be outright lies - inflammatory and misleading, as was much of the content of the pamphlet. Immediately after the election, the Greens stated that the "... pamphlet drop probably cost the party a seat", and perhaps enough to have governed alone with Labour.

The pamphlets were released with minimal information as to who had funded them, with only the names and PO Box addresses of individuals. Former members of the Plymouth Brethren Christian Church (formerly known as the Exclusive Brethren) recognised those names and informed the Green Party and the media of their links with the Brethren, which had been involved in a similar campaign in Australia. The National party and its leader Don Brash initially denied knowing about the pamphlets, but Brash later admitted that he had met with the Brethren three or four times during the campaign, where he was told "they planned to run some advertisements in the media, particularly around defence and health policies". Brash asserts that he and his staff advised the Brethren to check the legality of their advertising and that National had no control over its content. Brash also says that he did not recall their intention to issue anti-Green pamphlets. Brash and other National supporters noted that unions have funded third party advertising in support of Labour, and argued that the Brethren pamphlets were equivalent. Labour Party strategist Pete Hodgson responded that advertising paid for by unions was declared within Labour's budget and explicit about who had funded and approved it.

University of Otago electoral law expert Andrew Geddis' opinion was that National probably did not break the law, but that the party's actions "stank" and that the electoral system was like "panel beaters designing intersections".

In addition to the pamphlets, the Plymouth Brethren Christian Church assisted the National Party through help with man-power, rather than direct donations. The group had collected a "war-chest" of $1,200,000, though there is no evidence they spent anywhere near this much during the election campaign. The Plymouth Brethren Christian Church members had originally intended to openly support National but modified the pamphlets to an invitation to "Change the Government" after consulting with the Chief Electoral Officer and being informed that otherwise this would count towards National's spending. The issue of Brethren involvement led to Labour calls for compulsory disclosure of large donations to political parties within altered campaign finance legislation.

Activist Nicky Hager felt there were clear distinctions on the legal advertisings of the Unions and what he alleged as obvious violations of the election act section 221 by not only the Plymouth Brethren Christian Church with full knowledge of members of the National party (The Hollow Men: A Study in the Politics of Deception p238), but also third party spending by several other groups including the Horse Racing Lobby. Hager adds rhetorically, "Why was this not picked up by Auditor-General Kevin Brady...?" (The Hollow Men: A Study in the Politics of Deception p240)

== Darnton's lawsuit ==
On 29 June 2006, Bernard Darnton, leader of the Libertarianz, sued Helen Clark for allegedly misappropriating public funds to pay for her "pledge cards" during the 2005 election. Some commentators labelled the lawsuit a stunt, although it received media coverage as concern about the "pledge card" funding grew. The Auditor-General and Solicitor-General both stated, in the Auditor-General's report to Parliament, their opinion that the pledge card expenditure was a breach of the Public Finance Act. Following the passage of the Labour Party's validating retrospective legislation on 18 October 2006, Darnton's lawsuit became defunct as the courts would rely on the retrospective provisions of the legislation.

== Political response ==
=== Corruption claims ===
Based on the draft Auditor General's report, the National Party accused Labour of corruption, with Don Brash claiming that "Helen Clark's Labour Government is quite simply the most corrupt government in New Zealand history." He later amended that to "most corrupt in the last 100 years". The claim was made on the basis of deliberate over-spending under the Electoral Act being a "corrupt practice". Parliamentary debate rapidly deteriorated into shouting matches, with minor parties threatening a walk-out.

ACT New Zealand leader Rodney Hide disagreed with the term "corruption" being applied to the spending. "The AG's report doesn't show corruption. If it did National would be corrupt too. They were found to have misspent 10k. They would be corrupt too—just not as successful! I could see it was going to get ugly once the Nats went down the tactic of consistently labelling Labour corrupt... I disagree with everything that Labour does—but they are not corrupt. Devious and cunning, yes. Not corrupt."

=== Sleaze allegations ===
In response to National calling Labour "corrupt", Labour ministers Trevor Mallard and David Benson-Pope made reference during Question Time to allegations Don Brash was having an affair with Business Roundtable vice chairwoman Diane Foreman. Rumours to that effect had been circulating for some time, however the allegations were not published by the media until National MP Brian Connell raised them in caucus and the ensuing debate was leaked to the media. The Independent Financial Review first published the allegations.

Investigate magazine then published a photograph with commentary implying that Clark's husband Peter Davis was gay. Other mainstream media outlets quickly republished the rumour. Clark and Davis emphatically denied the allegation. Campaigner Chuck Bird said he provided the photo to Investigate in protest against Labour's election spending.

Soon after, and within a day of saying that personal abuse had no place in NZ politics, Clark described Don Brash, leader of the opposition, as a "cancerous" and "corrosive" presence in national affairs, a statement for which she was later criticised. In an interview the following day she gave the example of a cartoon on the Young Nationals' website which had been there since before the election campaign, and indeed before Brash's leadership of the Party, depicting her as Star Wars villain Darth Vader telling Luke Skywalker she is his "lesbian father". Brash subsequently requested the image be taken down.

Told that the National Party had expressed sympathy for her, Ms Clark replied: "I have very, very prominent friends in New Zealand life who have rung me... saying they were simply amazed at the sort of people, seemingly reputable citizens, who were prepared to pass on baseless lies as if they were factual."

Clark also claimed that the Plymouth Brethren Christian Church had hired a private detective to follow Mr Davis and herself. Within a week, private detective Wayne Idour admitted being hired by the sect "to dig dirt" on Labour MPs and described some of the things he had found out as "alarming". He told the media that he would make these "alarming" discoveries public within a week. Nothing appeared.

=== The Hollow Men ===
Nicky Hager published The Hollow Men: A Study in the Politics of Deception in November 2006 after an interim injunction against the publication of Brash's private email correspondence was lifted at the request of Dr Brash's lawyer. Hager claims that the National Party spent millions of dollars in its election campaign without breaching the legal spending cap. He points to several possible breaches of the election law by National, and asserts that the scope of the Auditor General's inquiry was "very limited" and did not include illegal third party advertising. According to Hager, evidence from undisclosed sources and the leaked e-mails point to a breach of section 221 of the Electoral Act. He further asserts that the book "Postcard From Home", Brash's biography, was called a "significant marketing tool" by Brash, and that the National-produced "Fairtax postcards" were "exactly the same expense as Labour’s pledge card".

In addition, Hager disclosed a letter from the Plymouth Brethren Christian Church (formerly known as Exclusive Brethren) to Don Brash and John Key (later head of the National Party) stating that "We are working on 'our/your' campaign full-time" written in May 2005, four months before the election. According to the Sunday Star Times, this and other documents "confirm, that months before the election campaign, that National Party MPs and staff... were fully aware of the Exclusive Brethren advertising campaign and that at least some MPs had seen the draft publications".

The sources and alleged breaches by National in Hager's book remain controversial and have sparked a debate regarding the invasion of privacy versus the public interest. On 27 November 2006, the Greens called for further investigation.

=== Don Brash resigns ===
On 12 December 2006, Don Brash resigned from the leadership of the National Party and subsequently retired from Parliament; the leadership of the party passed to John Key. Speculation exists that Don Brash resigned due to the allegations in Nicky Hager's book. However, Brash has said that the book was "not a factor" in his resignation.

=== Public response ===
Most political commentators believe that Helen Clark misjudged the public mood on the alleged spending, calling it "a beltway issue" - that is, of interest only to those who are involved the political process and not of interest to ordinary voters. A TVNZ opinion poll showed a 13% lead to National during the fallout, but other polls showed Labour and National neck and neck. A TV 3 poll around the same time showed Labour ahead on 4 November 2006. Labour's rating remained within 2 points consistently during the debate. For the first time, some media reported dissatisfaction with Helen Clark's leadership amongst the Labour Party Caucus. Clark continued to lead the party until after their electoral defeat in the 2008 election.

Dominion Post commentator Chris Trotter wrote in the 20-Oct-06 Dominion Post that "Solicitor General Terence Arnold QC's "expansive" interpretation of the Parliamentary Services Act betrayed a woeful lack of knowledge about the way our political system operates", and continued:

His opinion characterised parliamentarians as glorified civil servants subject to executive oversight and prohibited from spending public funds on any form of political advocacy (which he appeared to regard as a private activity). In his version of parliamentary democracy, political parties are viewed as entities extraneous to Parliament and play no role in the day to day operations of government. Mr Brady went on to compound the anti democratic, effect of the solicitor general's opinion by confining his investigation into "unlawful" parliamentary expenditure to election advertising. It was this decision, another "cock up", which allowed the Opposition to set in motion a major political conspiracy... The auditor general's office and the news media had both become important adjuncts to the Opposition's campaign to destroy Labour's political reputation.

As officers of Parliament, the capacity of the Auditor-General and Solicitor-General to respond to criticism is limited. However, Jim Evans, emeritus professor of law at Auckland University, responded to the critics of the Auditor-General's report on a blog saying that "various attempts [have] been made in recent weeks to obfuscate the issues surrounding the Auditor-General's report on advertising expenditure by political parties in the three months before the last general election".

== Overhaul of election funding laws ==
The government announced that, in light of the funding problems, they would look into changing the Electoral Act 1993 surrounding election funding. Following the release of the Auditor-General's report, the Appropriation (Parliamentary Expenditure Validation) Bill was moved through Parliament in two days under urgency, being passed on 18 October 2006.

Later, the Government introduced the Electoral Finance Bill to reform electoral finance laws.

== See also ==
- Campaign finance
