= Nannie Jamieson =

British violist (1904 - 1990)

Nannie Jamieson MBE
- Born: Agnes Jessie Hamilton Jamieson; 9 May 1904; Edinburgh, Scotland
- Died: 18 January 1990 (aged 85) New Malden, Surrey, England
- Genres: Classical
- Occupations: Musician, Professor
- Instruments: Violin, Viola

Agnes Jessie Hamilton Jamieson (9 May 1904 – 18 January 1990) was a British violist. She was a founder member and violist of the Robert Masters Quartet from 1939 until 1963. She was a founder member of the Menuhin Festival Orchestra, and Professor of Violin and Viola at the Guildhall School of Music in London.

== Early life and education ==
Agnes (Nannie) Jessie Hamilton Jamieson was born on 9 May 1904 in Edinburgh, to James Dalgleish Hamilton Jamieson and Jessie Ann Fergusson Ireland. Her father was a dental surgeon and a keen amateur violinist, and her mother was a singer, pianist and violist. Her younger sister Hilda was a cellist, a pupil of Emanuel Feuermann in Vienna. The family often performed together in concerts at their summer home in Bowden, Roxburghshire. Her summer home in Bowden, The Knowe, also welcomed guests such as Guilhermina Suggia and other notable performers of the period. The Knowe was sold by Jamieson's father in 1933. Jamieson was also a keen Girl Guide and proficient Morse signaller.

Jamieson's early violin lessons at the Waddel's School of Music in Edinburgh were firstly with James Winram and later with Esther Cruikshank, who had studied at the Leipzig Conservatoire, and Gladys Clark, who had studied at the Guildhall School of Music. She also studied with Donald Tovey who was a neighbour and friend of the Jamiesons.

Unbeknownst to her parents, Jamieson, aged only 14, sat the entrance exam to read medicine at Edinburgh University. She did not pass the exam at this first attempt but was successful at a later attempt, however she did not take up the place.

== Career ==
In 1921 Jamieson performed Elgar's Pastourelle for Violin, which won her a medal at the Edinburgh Music Festival. Jamieson, with her sister Hilda and the pianist Isobel Armour, made early performances and broadcasts in the 1920s, with the Tunic Trio, also called the Children's Trio, as they gave weekly performances on the Scottish Children's Hour programmes.

Her first concerto performance was with the Edinburgh Amateur Orchestral Society, when she played Max Bruch's violin concerto. The orchestra was conducted by Mr. Paul Della Torre.

In 1926 she travelled to Germany with her sister, at the recommendation of Donald Tovey who was a neighbour and friend, to study with Josef Wolfsthal and later Carl Flesch at the Hochschule für Musik in Berlin. Alma Moodie made the final arrangements for her studies abroad and Jamieson stayed in Germany for ten years. Also studying with Flesch at the time was Max Rostal and Jamieson facilitated his departure from Germany in 1934, owing to the rising tensions in Germany. Rostal became a British subject in August 1946. In return for lessons in English, Rostal gave Jamieson violin and chamber music lessons. She returned to Scotland at various times in the 1930s to perform in concerts and broadcasts with the Beredin Quartet which she had formed from students from 'Ber'lin and 'Edin'burgh, hence the name. The piano quartet comprised Nannie Jamieson on first violin, German violinist Berta Volmer on second violin, the Dutch violist Gert Berlage on viola and Hilda Jamieson on cello. Jamieson led the Beredin Quartet for four years. She performed with the Joan Singleton Trio at this time as well; Joan on piano and Jamieson's sister Hilda on cello. The trio also broadcast on the Scottish Regional Programmes.

The Beredin Quartet performed in Holland in March 1933, touring The Hague, playing at the Pulchri Studio Doetinchem, and Amsterdam.

In Berlin, Jamieson was a member of a quartet led by Alma Moodie and it was Moodie who helped Jamieson gain her first teaching post in Devon. In 1936 Jamieson went to Dartington Hall in Devon, where she taught violin at the new school Foxhole, and later in the music department which was being developed by Hans Oppenheim.

At Dartington she formed a trio with the Scottish pianist Ronald Kinloch Anderson (Anderson was replaced by the Canadian pianist Ross Pratt in 1957) and the cellist Muriel Taylor. Robert Masters later joined the group and it was at this point that Jamieson switched to the viola. The Robert Masters Piano Quartet was founded in 1939. With the Robert Masters quartet, Jamieson performed throughout the world for over twenty-five years.

During the war the quartet known then as the Dartington Hall Chamber Group, played at the National Gallery concerts and numerous events for CEMA and ENSA, in the south-west of England, with just one trip to the Hebrides in 1943 to entertain the Royal Navy fleet. The group consisted of Robert Masters, violin; Jamieson on viola, Muriel Taylor on cello and Ronald Anderson on piano, (when Anderson was not serving with the RAF).

Many works were written for the Masters quartet by composers such as Imogen Holst, Brian Easdale, Peter Pope, Benjamin Frankel and Ivor Walsworth. The quartet gave several performances of chamber music by the English composer William Wordsworth, who was a close friend of the Jamieson family. In May 1944 the Dartington Hall String Trio, comprising Robert Masters, Nannie Jamieson and Muriel Taylor gave the first performance of Imogen Holst's First String Trio for violin, viola and cello, which was dedicated to them. The London première of the Trio took place on 17 July 1944 at a National Gallery concert given by the dedicatees. On 28 September 1951, the work received its first broadcast on the BBC Third Programme.

Jamieson played with other ensembles during her long, playing career. Amongst them was the Philharmonic Harp Trio with John Francis (flute) and Maria Korchinska (harp). Just after the war, in 1946, Jamieson started her professorship at the Guildhall School of Music, where she taught until the end of her life. She gained her Fellowship of the GSM in 1956. She was guest professor of viola at the Bern Conservatory, Switzerland and at the Banff School of Fine Arts, Canada. She also taught at various times at Chetham's School in Manchester and Homerton College in Cambridge. In June and October 1946, and again in April 1948, the Robert Masters Quartet performed at the Wigmore Hall. The Quartet frequently broadcast for the BBC at Home, Empire and Overseas Services.

The Masters Quartet were asked to perform at the first International Festival of Music and Drama in Edinburgh in 1947.

Jamieson played and recorded with Yehudi Menuhin for the Bath Festival Orchestra and later was a founder member with Robert Masters of the Menuhin Festival Orchestra. In the 1950s, the Masters Quartet ran a Summer School of Chamber Music at Easthampstead Park near Wokingham in Berkshire. In 1958 Sir Arthur Bliss, then Master of the Queen's Music, visited the summer school and conducted one of his own compositions.

In 1950 and 1956 the Masters Quartet undertook world tours which saw them traveling to Australia, New Zealand, Malaya and the United States. In the 1950 tour of Australia, between July and October of that year, they played in every State and performed over thirty times.

In February 1955 Jamieson played the Mozart Sinfonia Concertante with Robert Masters. The orchestra, the Bournemouth Symphony Orchestra was led by Hugh Maguire and conducted by Sir Charles Groves. Jamieson had played the Sinfonia Concertante with Masters several times before that, and was to play it on numerous occasions afterwards with violinists such as Maria Lidka. In 1960 Jamieson performed the Sinfonia Concertante for Viola and Double-bass by Carl Ditters von Dittersdorf, with James Edward Merrett and the Orion Orchestra, conducted by Blanche Mundlak.

Jamieson, after the death of her close friend Muriel Taylor from Leukaemia in 1971, set up a memorial fund which became the Muriel Taylor Scholarship for Cellists. Laureates of the scholarship include Steven Isserlis, Raphael Wallfisch and Alexander Baillie.

The Association of American String Teachers (ASTA, founded in 1946), was imitated on all continents (ESTA in Europe, JASTA in Japan, AUSTA in Australia). The first presidents in Europe were Max Rostal and Yehudi Menuhin. Menuhin was the first chairman and Nannie Jamieson was the first Organising Secretary for the UK branch of the European String Teachers Association ESTA (UK), which was founded in 1973.

In 1973 Jamieson performed at the Carl Flesch centenary concert conducted by Yehudi Menuhin. Amongst the players were a large assembly of Flesch's pupils including: Ida Haendel, Henryk Szeryng, Bronislav Gimpel, Max Rostal, Yfrah Neaman, Suzanne Rozsa Lovett and Robert Masters.

In the 1981 Birthday Honours Jamieson was appointed a Member of the Order of the British Empire (MBE) for services to music. She received the American Award of Leadership and Service to Music in 1982. In 1984 she and Max Rostal received the Isaac Stern International Award for Services to Music, from the American String Teachers Association.

There are a number of recordings which feature Jamieson, including the Faure Piano Quartet in C minor op.15 and the G minor Piano Quartet op.45. Also, Walton Piano Quartet; The Six Brandenburg Concertos and The Musical Offering, J.S. Bach, with Yehudi Menuhin and the Bath Festival Orchestra.

From 1953, Jamieson played on a 1731 viola made by Pietro Paolo De Vitor of the Montagnana workshop in Venice. She also owned and played a Maggini viola.

Jamieson taught a number of leading violists and musicians including: Brian Masters (Sadlers Wells Opera Orch., LPO, LSO, Lancaster Ensemble (1969–71), MacNaghten Str. Quartet); Donald Maurice (Professor of Music at the New Zealand School of Music, violist with the New Zealand Piano Quartet; treasurer of the International Viola Society); Edward Vanderspar (Principal Viola of the London Symphony Orchestra); Peter Martin (Composer, arranger); Philip Borg-Wheeler (violist, BBC Welsh Symphony Orchestra); Tricia Maguire (founder with Hugh Maguire of the ConCorda Chamber Music Course for Strings); Philip Clark (assistant professor of viola and violin at Ithaca College, founding member of the Auckland String Quartet); Rafael Todes (Member of the CBSO under Sir Simon Rattle; founder member of the Schidlof String Quartet; member of the Allegri Quartet); Amanda Denley (viola professor at the Guildhall School of Music, BBC Symphony Orchestra, Aylwin String Quartet); Jonathan Brett Harrison (Erstwhile violist with the Zurich Chamber Orchestra, Conductor of the Basel Philharmonic Orchestra and the Zurich Orchestra Society).

== Death and legacy ==
After a fall in Switzerland in November 1989, Jamieson died the following year on 18 January.

Jamieson's red hair seems to have made an impression throughout her life. At 18 years of age, she had her portrait painted by the Orcadian artist Stanley Cursiter. During the Robert Masters Quartet tour of Australia in 1950, the critics made several references to her auburn hair, one commenting that Jamieson resembled the Hollywood star Greer Garson who was also born in 1904. The ESTA publication which details her great contribution to the world of music, is entitled: The Red Hot Magnet, in reference to her red hair and one of her viola exercises which she had called Red-hot and Magnet.

After Jamieson's death in 1990, the Nannie Jamieson Nutshell Fund was launched by Yehudi Menuhin to honour the memory of Nannie Jamieson. The name of the fund was adopted from the title of a demonstration lecture, developed by Jamieson, which covered many of the basics of violin and viola playing. She called it: "Technique in a Nutshell". Her name is remembered in the Musicians' Book of Remembrance in the Musician's Chapel within the Church of the Holy Sepulchre, (The Musicians' Church) in London.

== References and sources ==
=== Sources ===
==== Books ====
- Jamieson, James Dalgleish Hamilton (1960). Ham and Jam: Days, Doings, Diversions, Drawings and Doggerel Ditties of a Dentist. Buckinghamshire, England: The Abbey Press, Abingdon. OCLC 30222104.
- White, John (1997). An Anthology of British Viola Players. Colne, Lancashire: Comus Edition. ISBN 9780953106905. OCLC 38266489. OL 20287075M.
