= Miron Grindea =

Romanian literary journalist and magazine editor (1909–1995)

Miron Grindea OBE
- Born: Mondi Miron Grunberg; 31 January 1909; Târgu Ocna, Kingdom of Romania
- Died: 18 November 1995 (aged 86); London, England
- Education: University of Bucharest; Sorbonne
- Occupations: Literary journalist and editor
- Notable work: ADAM International Review
- Spouse(s): Carola Rabinovici, m. 1936
- Children: 1

Miron Grindea OBE (31 January 1909 – 18 November 1995) was a Romanian-British literary journalist and the editor of ADAM International Review, a literary magazine published for more than 50 years. In 1984, ADAM was said to be "the world's longest surviving literary magazine". Its title was an acronym for "Arts, Drama, Architecture and Music".

== Biography ==
Born Mondi Miron Grunberg in the town of Târgu Ocna, Kingdom of Romania, he moved with his Jewish family after the First World War to the capital of Romania, Bucharest. Having studied humanities at the University of Bucharest and at the Sorbonne in Paris, France, Miron Grindea from 1929 began reviewing music and literature for the Jewish cultural review ADAM and became its co-editor in 1936. That same year, he married the pianist Carola Rabinovici (1914–2009); their daughter Nadia was also to become a pianist. Grindea and his wife arrived in Britain in September 1939, two days before the outbreak of the Second World War, and he was soon employed in the BBC’s European Intelligence Section at Bush House, London.

== ADAM International Review, 1941–95 ==
When in 1941, many émigré authors, including Thomas Mann and Stefan Zweig, gathered in London for a meeting of the international writers' club PEN, under the presidency of H. G. Wells, Grindea was inspired to start an international literary journal. To avoid wartime restrictions on new publications, he revived ADAM in September that year.

His eminent associates and contributors included Cyril Connolly, Stephen Spender, J. B. Priestley (who were all among the several members of ADAM's editorial board) T. S. Eliot and George D. Painter. Grindea's personal library (housed at the Foyles Special Collections Library at the Maughan Library) includes signed copies of works by Arthur Koestler, André Gide, Robert Graves, Bertrand Russell, Tristan Tzara, Patrick Moore and Graham Greene and many others. As David Gascoyne noted: "It was in fact obvious, in the mid-forties, to any educated reader, that Adam's only rival was the then recently defunct Criterion, edited by T S Eliot."

Grindea edited and, with subsidies, financed ADAM International Review (Art, Drama, Architecture, and Music) from his home at Emperor's Gate in Kensington, London. Over the decades, ADAM featured an range of subjects in the magazine, and attracted a prominent list of unpaid contributors (in both English and French), who at various times included George Bernard Shaw, Cecil Day-Lewis, W. H. Auden, E. M. Forster, Anthony Powell, Lawrence Durrell, Winston Churchill, Max Beerbohm, François Mauriac and Samuel Beckett. The review also featured drawings by artists including Picasso and Chagall.

Among writers who made their debut in ADAM are Maureen Duffy and Wolf Mankowitz, and others Grindea enlisted as sometime workers include Margaret Busby (who on leaving university was briefly his editorial assistant) and Erik de Mauny, who recalled: "I am sure that I am not the only one among his friends to have been telephoned late at night with urgent requests for help and advice with the next number of Adam." Hanif Kureishi was quoted in a 2014 Guardian article as saying: "I only once pitchforked a person I knew directly into a novel to make a point, and that was Miron Grindea, the editor of the international literary magazine Adam, whose respectful attendance on the great and good in his editorials I found highly amusing."

At the time of Grindea's death aged 86, in London in 1995, he was working on the 500th edition of ADAM.

== Awards ==
- 1955, Prix de l'Académie française
- 1965, Lundquist Literary Prize, Sweden
- 1974, Chevalier de la Légion d'Honneur
- 1977, Member of the Most Excellent Order of the British Empire (MBE)
- 1983, Honorary DLitt degree from the University of Kent
- 1985, Commander, Order of Arts and Letters, France
- 1986, Officer of the Most Excellent Order of the British Empire (OBE)

== Legacy ==
In 2006, ADAM: An Anthology of Miron Grindea's ADAM Editorials (2 volumes), selected and edited by his grand-daughter Rachel Lasserson (former editor of Jewish Quarterly), was published (London: Vallentine Mitchell), with an Introduction entitled "Music, Proust and Anti-Semitism".

== Archives ==
Miron Grindea's papers and the ADAM archives are largely held at King's College London. A commemorative exhibition, Miron Grindea and the Art of Literary Journalism, was held at the Weston Room, Maughan Library and Information Services Centre, Chancery Lane, in 2003.

Two portraits of Grindea are in the collection of the National Portrait Gallery, London: an unattributed photo of him taken in 1939 and a photograph by Barry Marsden (1989).
