= Ngaire Thomas =

New Zealand writer

Ngaire Ruth Thomas (1943 – 17 March 2012, first name pronounced Nyree) was a New Zealand author who wrote the book Behind Closed Doors about her life in a conservative Christian sect, the Exclusive branch of the Plymouth Brethren. It details the abuse she suffered within the church and her eventual excommunication. The second edition was edited to avoid legal action threatened by the Brethren.

== Life ==
Thomas was born into the Exclusive Brethren. At the age of 15 Thomas was approached by elders:

"they came to me because they’d heard that there was something between me and my cousin and when they asked me if I had committed fornication, I said oh yes, I suppose so, because I knew I had kissed and cuddled my cousin down in the bushes down behind his house and nobody had explained to me what they were talking about. And I could tell by their very concerned faces that this just wasn’t a good answer. And of course I was put in my room on my own for several days and just sort [of] fed through the door until it was my turn to go up in front of the Church of about probably 500 or 600 people. And nobody bothered to come and ask me if I knew what they were talking about."

"I was given the microphone and told to say I was sorry for not crying out [fighting the cousin's advances]. I stood up in front of about five or six hundred people ... The sea of stern and solemn faces was just a blur in front of me as I apologised for something I didn't do. When I had said I was sorry and had been graciously forgiven by the Brethren, I sat down in my seat and cried with humiliation and shame."

This led directly to another event:

"Although it was a very traumatic experience, something good came out of it. At fifteen, although still rather ignorant of some things, I was old enough to know that if it was wrong for my cousin to hug and kiss me, then what my father was doing to me was very, very wrong indeed ... I threatened my father that I would 'cry out' and cause a public scandal ... if he did not stop his inappropriate behaviour ... The abuse ended there and then; he was careful never to touch me again."

She married Dennis Thomas at the age of 18. She had four children but having had a stroke at the age of 28, she started to take the combined oral contraceptive pill on the advice of her doctor. After 5 years her inability to produce a further child was questioned by the church elders. When her use of contraceptives was discovered the family were 'shut up' — shunned. During the shutting up, Thomas and her husband were banned from having sex. When asked after a week if they had broken this rule – after first lying – Dennis admitted that they had. They were then 'withdrawn' — a further stage of shunning. Thomas has termed this 'psychological abuse'.

By 1974, Ngaire was deemed not "sufficiently repentant" and "contentious and rebellious". The family was excommunicated.

Thomas became a Quaker and remained so until her death in 2012.

== Behind Closed Doors ==
Thomas started writing the book in 1999, about her experiences in the Exclusive Brethren. It was self-published and sold 1000 copies without advertising. Subsequently, Random House discovered the book and now publishes it.

== See also ==
- Behind the Exclusive Brethren
