= Bernard Darnton =

New Zealand politician

Bernard Darnton (born 18 December 1972 in Leicester, United Kingdom) is a former leader of Libertarianz, a libertarian political party in New Zealand.

== Involvement in the Libertarianz party ==
In the party's list for the 1999 election, Darnton had been ranked fourth. In the party list announced for the 2002 election, however, Darnton was ranked twentieth, although the list itself was not submitted by the appropriate deadline. Darnton became leader in mid-2004, replacing Russell Watkins, and remained in the position until the 2008 election. In 2004, Darnton unsuccessfully stood for election in the Wellington Regional Council's Wellington constituency. For the 2005 and 2008 General Elections, Darnton headed the Libertarianz party list and was the electorate candidate for Wellington Central.

=== Darnton v Clark ===
On 29 June 2006, Bernard Darnton filed proceedings in the High Court, suing Helen Clark for allegedly misappropriating public funds to pay for the Labour Party's pledge cards during the 2005 election. Some commentators labelled the lawsuit a stunt, although it received some media coverage as concern about the "pledge card" funding grew.

On Sunday 10 September 2006, the lawsuit was the subject of a front-page story in The Sunday Star-Times newspaper. The Labour party promptly accused the Libertarianz party of being part of a conspiracy with the National party, alleging that the small party could not afford to bring such a case to court.

In October 2006, after the Auditor-General released a report declaring that the misappropriation of funds was illegal, Labour and other political parties immediately announced that they would pay back the money. On 17 and 18 October, a majority, including the Labour Party, passed a law through Parliament to 'retrospectively validate' the spending, making it legal, which is required under the Public Finance Act 1989. In the circumstances, however, it also effectively makes the misspending immune from court proceedings.

In response, the Libertarianz party declared 18 October 2006 to be "Banana Republic Day", and issued press releases.

== See also ==
- 2005 New Zealand election funding controversy
