= Bill Hocking =

Cornish fisherman (1929–2020)

William Hocking known as "Downderry Bill" (1929–2020) was a Cornish fisherman, being based in the port of Looe.
