= William John Hocking =

British numismatist (1864–1953)

William John Hocking CVO CBE (10 March 1864 – 10 April 1953) was a British numismatist. He worked at the Royal Mint from 1883 to 1926, beginning as a clerk and retiring as Superintendent of the Mint.

== Biography ==
Hocking was born at Sennen Cove, Cornwall into a Congregational church family.

He went to London and secured a clerical post at the Royal Mint on 17 July 1883. In 1908 he travelled to Melbourne, Australia on supervise mint business there. In 1917 he was the Assistant Superintendent of the Operative Department. In due course he became the Superintendent of the Royal Mint, Tower Bridge, London.

Upon retirement he and his family moved down to Danbury, Essex, where he lived until his death. His work at the Mint – especially during the war years (1914–1918) and the period of depression in the 1920s it required great skill in securing the exact alloy balance in the manufacture of coins – resulted in him being appointed a Commander of the Order of the British Empire (CBE) in the 1918 Birthday Honours, and on retirement a Commander of the Royal Victorian Order (CVO) in the 1926 Birthday Honours.

His research into the history of British coins made him one of the foremost numismatists in his day as well as at the present. He was the librarian and curator of the Mint's collection of British coins. His Catalogue of The Coins, Tokens ... Museum Of The Royal Mint (2 vols, 1906–10) are referred to frequently at the Royal Mint library in Llantrisant, Wales. His work Simon's Dies In The Royal Mint Museum (1909) is also of importance. The proceedings of the Royal Numismatic Society in 1915 give Hocking's research on the collection of coining instruments in the National Museum of Antiquities in Edinburgh.

=== Private life ===
He married a second time following the death of his first wife. Stanley Hocking was his firstborn son. His middle child and second son was Leonard Charles Hocking, who died 1940. His youngest son Leslie (was in the R.A.M.C.) died on the Somme 1914–1918.

He joined the Plymouth Brethren in the 1880s, soon came to the attention of William Kelly and began contribution to the oral and written ministry of the Brethren. In 1920 he commenced editing The Bible Monthly magazine. Under the pseudonym of "Yod", he wrote a number of pamphlets for young Christians. He also wrote some expository books on the Bible. His book The Son of His Love was a defence of Christ's Eternal Sonship. He also worked on the revision of the Little Flock hymnbook which was produced in 1928 and wrote a number of hymns currently in print in Spiritual Songs (1978).

He died in Blackheath, London and was buried at Nunhead Cemetery with his first wife.
