= Michael Bachelard =

Australian journalist

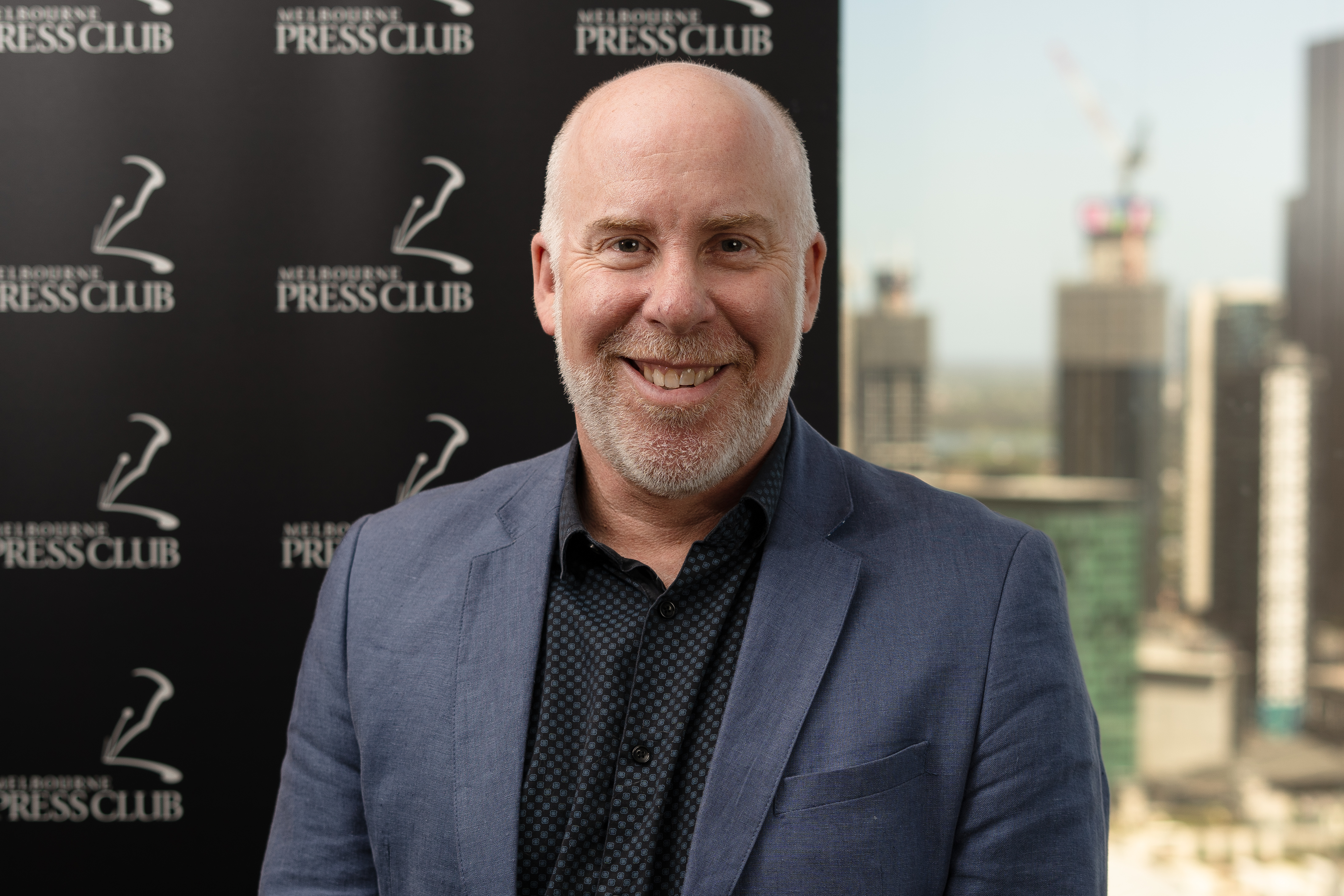
- Born: 1968 (age 57–58)
- Occupations: Journalist, author
- Employer: Fairfax Media (now Nine Publishing)
- Writing career
- Years active: 1990s–present
- Genre: Non-fiction,
- Notable awards: Gold Walkley (2017)

Michael Bachelard (born 1968) is an Australian journalist and author.

In 1997, Bachelard wrote The Great Land Grab: What every Australian should know about Wik, Mabo and the Ten Point Plan.

Bachelard's Behind the Exclusive Brethren was published in 2008, which explored the Australian sect of the Exclusive Brethren.

For his work as the foreign editor at Fairfax Media, Bachelard was the co-recipient of the 2017 Gold Walkley. Shared with photographer Kate Geraghty, the award was in recognition for their work Surviving IS: Stories from Mosul.

In October 2024, he was elected as the new president of the Melbourne Press Club.
