= David Hendricks =

American businessman

David Hendricks (born 1954) is an American businessman convicted of killing his wife and three children in 1984, but acquitted in a retrial in 1991.

== Life ==
David James Hendricks was born in Morton Grove and raised in Oak Park, Illinois. He was a member of the Exclusive branch of the Plymouth Brethren, a Christian denomination. He started and ran a highly successful business in Bloomington, Illinois, selling an orthopedic back-brace he had patented. He later bought a large house at a then-new development in Bloomington and moved his family there.

== Murders ==
On November 7, 1983, while Hendricks was out of state on a business trip, his wife Susan, 30, and the couple's three children — Rebekah, 9; Grace, 7; and Benjamin, 5 — were found murdered in their Bloomington home by a police officer performing a welfare check, requested after Hendricks was unable to reach them by phone. The murder weapons, consisting of an axe and a butcher's knife, had been left at the scene. Hendricks was interviewed immediately on return from his trip and became the primary suspect due to his relationship with the victims and the police detectives' initial dissatisfaction with his demeanor.

== Trial and aftermath ==
Hendricks was tried the following year. The trial was moved from Bloomington to Rockford, Illinois, 133 miles (214 km) away, where he was found guilty in a jury trial. The judge took the unusual step of indicating publicly that while he was not criticizing the jury for performing their duty, he was not personally convinced beyond reasonable doubt. Hendricks' guilt was questioned due to the prosecution's reliance on circumstantial evidence and the possible prejudicial effect of statements made about his religious beliefs. Among other factors, the prosecution attempted to link the murders to Hendricks' belief that divorce was a sin. Hendricks had recently hired female models to demonstrate his product for marketing materials. Some of these women gave testimony for the prosecution that Hendricks asked them to remove clothing and made intimate contact with their upper bodies during private test-fittings. Since the brace was normally worn externally, expert witnesses were called to testify that regular clothing and a brief fitting time were more typical, emphasized with an in-court demonstration. The prosecution used these to form a circumstantial case for Hendricks being dissatisfied with his marriage and argued that since Hendricks did not believe in divorce, he had a motive to kill his wife and children.

The prosecution argued for Hendricks' sole guilt, although no direct evidence of guilt was found on Hendricks, including a lack of blood contamination. His lawyers failed to challenge some other key pieces of the prosecution's evidence, such as how the order of killings was dubious for a sole killer acting on Hendricks' schedule that evening, and that the weapons and blood spatter suggested two perpetrators. There were signs of carelessly-handled evidence by the investigating team, such as containers identified as the children's stomach contents containing material inconsistent with their known preferences. The contents had been used by an expert witness to establish a time of death prior to Hendricks leaving on his business trip.

Hendricks was sentenced to four consecutive life sentences. He served seven years in Menard Correctional Center in Illinois. While incarcerated Hendrick befriended his cellmate, convicted murderer and prison fugitive Henry Hillenbrand. Using a tape recorder and with Hillenbrand's blessing Hendricks used his jail time to pen a novel about Hillenbrand's life. Hendricks married a second time while in prison.

In 1991, the Illinois Supreme Court overturned the conviction and Hendricks was granted a retrial at the McLean County Law and Justice Center in Bloomington. A surprise prison witness for the prosecution claimed Hendricks had confessed the crime while incarcerated, but a jury was unconvinced and he was acquitted and released. Shortly afterward he renounced his fundamentalist religious ties and moved to Florida to start another orthopedic business. He presently lives in Orlando, Florida with his fourth wife, Gazel. He recently sold his last business and is presumed retired.

== In popular culture ==
A true-crime book about the family, religious background, murders and trial was written by journalist Steve Vogel, entitled Reasonable Doubt. Originally published in hardcover by Contemporary Books, it was a New York Times best-seller as a paperback published by St. Martin's Press, was re-issued as part of St. Martin's True Crime Classics, and re-published in 2018 with additional photos and new content as a paperback and e-book ISBN 978-1-54392-868-6). Also available as an audio book.

Jessica Snyder Sachs references the case in Corpse: Nature, Forensics, and the Struggle to Pinpoint Time of Death, published by Basic Books in 2001 (ISBN 0-7382-0771-3, ISBN 978-0-7382-0771-1).

In 2018, interest in the case was revived by an Investigation Discovery television episode focusing on the crime and its aftermath. The episode also attracted the attention of Champaign, Illinois columnist Jim Dey writing in the News-Gazette, who summarized the major points of the trial and the criticisms levied against it.

On October 4, 2021, Crime Junkie podcast released a full episode about the murders called: MURDERED: The Hendricks Family.

== See also ==
- Roger Panes - Brethren member who killed his wife and three children with an axe in 1974.
- Watts family murders
