= James Taylor Jr. (Exclusive Brethren) =

Religious leader of the Exclusive Brethren

James Taylor Jr. (1899–1970) was the religious leader of the Raven-Taylor-Hales Brethren.

== Background ==
Taylor was the son of Irish linen merchant James Taylor Sr (1870–1953), leader of the Raven Exclusive Brethren from about 1908 until his death. After a period of six years during which leadership was in question, Taylor Jr. took over in 1959. James Taylor Jr. lived in New York and was married with several children.

== Influence ==
Taylor emphasised biblical teachings on separation from the world to his followers. He encouraged his members not to eat with non-members. Membership of professional bodies was also discouraged. Under his teaching the Raven-Taylor Exclusives commenced "Breaking Bread" (the Eucharist) on Sunday at 6 am. His teachings and conduct were the source of much public interest in the UK. This resulted in:

- The consolidation of his position among a large section of his followers.
- The secession of many of his Scottish assemblies, others in Britain and beyond.
- The weakening of other Plymouth Brethren groups, both "Open," Glanton and Kelly Brethren, as they moved away from any appearance of the "separate" features of Taylorism.

His "separatist" pronouncements were maintained by his successors and followers. His hardline approach resulted in interrogations within the sect, abuse and suicides.

== Controversy ==
In 1970 Taylor was staying with a Brethren family in Aberdeen. He sexually assaulted some of the women in the house, slept with one of them and appeared drunk. He then spoke at the annual Meeting and appeared to be "suffering from alcoholic dementia". His speech was incoherent and scatological. His supporters said that this had been done to test members' loyalty. Many people left the Exclusive Brethren as a result of his behaviour. He died the same year of an illness related to alcohol.

== Successor ==
Taylor was succeeded as leader of the Exclusive Brethren by James H Symington, an American from Neche, North Dakota.
