= William Kelly (biblical scholar) =

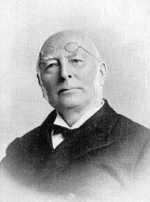
- William Kelly
- Born: 1821; Millisle, Ireland
- Died: 27 March 1906
- Occupations: Writer, Bible teacher

William Kelly (May 1821 – 27 March 1906) was a prominent Irish member of the Plymouth Brethren, amongst whom he was a prolific writer.

== Biography ==
Kelly was born in Millisle, County Down, Ireland. He was educated at Trinity College, Dublin. Left fatherless at a young age, he supported himself by teaching the family of a Mr. Cachemaille, Rector of Sark. He secured a post as governor to the Seigneur of Sark in 1841. He married in Guernsey and in the 1870s moved to Blackheath, London.

In 1840 Kelly made the Christian confession and, shortly afterwards, embraced the views of, and became a member of, the Plymouth Brethren. He retained a close connection with the Channel Islands for thirty years, residing chiefly in Guernsey.

Besides aiding Samuel Prideaux Tregelles in his investigations as a Biblical textual critic, Kelly also published, in 1860, a critical edition of the Book of Revelation, which was praised by Heinrich Ewald of Göttingen. Such studies were carried on concurrently with the editing of a periodical entitled The Prospect. He took up the editorship of The Bible Treasury in 1857, and continued till his death. As editor of the latter he was brought into correspondence with Henry Alford, Robert Scott the lexicographer, Principal Edwards and William Sanday of Oxford, among others.

Kelly died on 27 March 1906. Shortly before his death, Kelly said "There are three things real — the Cross, the enmity of the world, the love of God."

== Ministry ==
Kelly's chief interest was in ministering spiritually to those whom he described as the "few despised ones of Christ's flock." He provided this service until two months before his death. He identified himself whole-heartedly with the body of doctrine developed by John Nelson Darby, whose right-hand man he was for many years, until he severed his connection and formed a faction which bore his name.

The Collected Writings of John Nelson Darby were edited by Kelly. Kelly also edited the writings of John Gifford Bellett. Kelly's own writings contain lectures or notes on all the books of the Bible. The title-pages of Kelly's works generally bore the initials "W. K.". Several of his best-known expositions appeared during the last fifteen years of his life. Within Darby's lifetime, Kelly was known to outsiders for his lectures on the Pentateuch, the Gospel of Matthew, the Revelation of John, the Church of God, and the New Testament doctrine of the Holy Spirit, besides notes on Romans. After 1890 he issued In the Beginning, commended by Archbishop Benson and expositions of the prophecies of Isaiah, of the Gospel of John, of the epistle to the Hebrews, of the epistles of John; a volume of 600 pages on God's Inspiration of the Scriptures and his last words on Christ's Coming Again, in which he vindicates the originality of Darby's teaching in regard to the Secret Rapture.

== Selection of Works and Publications ==
- Lectures Introductory to the Study of the Pentateuch (1871)
- In the Beginning, and the Adamic Earth. An Exposition of Genesis I-II.3 (1890)
- The Higher Criticism
- God's Inspiration of the Scriptures (1903)
- Christ's Coming Again (1904)
