= John Parnell, 2nd Baron Congleton =

Christian missionary

The Right Honourable The Lord Congleton

Member of the House of Lords Lord Temporal
- In office 8 June 1842 – 23 October 1883; Hereditary peerage
- Preceded by: The 1st Baron Congleton
- Succeeded by: The 3rd Baron Congleton

Personal details
- Born: 16 June 1805
- Died: 23 October 1883 (aged 78)
- Spouses: Nancy Cronin (m. 1831; died 1832) Khatoon Moscow (m. 1833, died) Margaret Catherine Ormerod (m. 1867, died)
- Parents: Henry Parnell, 1st Baron Congleton; Lady Caroline Elizabeth Dawson-Damer
- Education: University of Edinburgh

John Vesey Parnell, 2nd Baron Congleton (16 June 1805 – 23 October 1883) was an aristocrat and Christian missionary.

== Life ==
Parnell was the son of Sir Henry Brooke Parnell, 1st Baron Congleton (1776–1842) and Lady Caroline Elizabeth Dawson-Damer (d. 1861), a daughter of John Dawson, 1st Earl of Portarlington. He was educated in France, then at the University of Edinburgh, Scotland. He succeeded to the title of 2nd Baron Congleton, of Congleton, Chester, on 8 June 1842. He succeeded to the title of 5th Baronet Parnell, of Rathleague, Queen's County on 8 June 1842.

He was related to the Irish patriot Charles Stewart Parnell. Parnell's life was marked by simplicity: when he lived in Teignmouth, Devon he took a modest house for the annual rent of £12.00. His uncarpeted home was furnished with simple wooden chairs, a plain, unvarnished deal table, steel cutlery and pewter teaspoons, and generosity: he was accustomed to devoting half his income to Christian works. Among his friends he counted George Muller, the well-known Brethren philanthropist of Bristol.

Baron Congleton died early in the morning of 23 October 1883 on a simple portable iron bedstead. Among his last utterances was reputed to be the words of the Christian martyr, Stephen, "Lord Jesus, receive my spirit".

== Plymouth Brethren and mission work ==
Parnell first met with other like-minded Christians in 1829 in Dublin, including John Nelson Darby, Edward Cronin and Francis Hutchinson. He paid for the rent of a large auction room in Aungier Street for the use in communion and prayer on the Lord's day (Sunday). He thought that the Lord's table should be a public witness of the Brethren's position. Aungier Street was the first public meeting room for the movement that became known as Plymouth Brethren and they commenced celebrating Lord's supper (the Breaking of Bread) in the spring of 1830. When he moved to London he lived at Welbeck Street, London, where the brethren meeting room was located.

He was a lifelong member of the Plymouth Brethren, and was one of their pioneer missionaries. Parnell went in September 1830 to Baghdad in the Ottoman Empire with his brother-in-law Edward Cronin and John Kitto to visit Anthony Norris Groves. The party went with books, medicine and a printing press and arrived in June 1831. The whole party found extreme resistance from local Muslims to their efforts and withdrew to India until 1837 when Groves established an enduring faith mission work.

When Lord Congleton became the 2nd Baron, being a Plymouth Brother, he would not side with any party and entered the House of Lords as a cross-bencher. Plymouth Brethren generally abstain from party politics.

He published his translation of the Psalms at William Yapp's publishing house of 70 Welbeck Street, London in 1860, with a revision in 1875 containing interpretative notes published by James E. Hawkins of the same address. Congleton also published a booklet The Open Meeting describing the manner of ministry among Plymouth Brethren.

The Auckland suburb of Parnell is named after him.

== Family ==
His first marriage was to Nancy Cronin, sister of the homeopathist Edward Cronin, in 1831 at Aleppo where she died in 1832 before reaching Baghdad. An Armenian widow, living in Iran, madame Khatoon Moscow, daughter of Ovauness Moscow, became his second wife in 1833. His third marriage was to Margaret Catherine Ormerod, daughter of Charles Ormerod, on 21 February 1867; with her Parnell had his only daughter, Sarah Cecilia (5 August 1868 – 26 April 1912).

== Notes ==
Peerage of the United Kingdom
Preceded by Henry Parnell	Baron Congleton; 1842–1883	Succeeded by Henry William Parnell
