= Timothy Stunt =

British historian

Timothy Carl Francis Stunt (born 4 August 1941), known professionally as T.C.F. Stunt or Timothy Stunt, is a British historian and career history teacher. A Fellow of the Royal Historical Society, his focus is on nineteenth-century Christianity with an emphasis on British and Swiss evangelicalism, and the Brethren movement in particular. He has been called “the pre-eminent historian” of early nineteenth-century evangelicalism and “one of the last gentleman-scholars”. He has published on John Nelson Darby, Anthony Norris Groves, Francis William Newman, and other early Plymouth Brethren.

== Personal life ==
Stunt was born in Chelmsford, northeast of London, to a middle-class family. His father had a third generation affiliation with Open Brethren, placing his family in “the heart” of that movement. In 2020, Stunt wrote that “I can no longer call myself a Plymouth Brother”. Stunt was educated at St Lawrence College, Ramsgate and Sidney Sussex College, Cambridge (BA, 1964), where he studied modern history and theology. He received his PhD degree from Cambridge University in 2001 for his From Awakening to Secession (2000).

Having been told that the Biblioteca Nazionale of Florence contained a great deal of Brethren material collected by Count Piero Guicciardini (1808-86), who had been associated with Brethren, he spent 1964-65 researching 19th century European evangelicals there. Some years later he was consultant and proof-reader for the published catalogue of Il Fondo Guicciardini (3 vols., 1984-7).

In 2000, he married Nancy (née Wesselmann). The two taught French and French culture for over 6 years at the same adult education program in Connecticut. He has two children and two grandchildren.

== Teaching career ==
Stunt began his teaching career in London (Coopers’ Company School; Lincoln School; and Gravesend School for Boys) before becoming the head of history at Aiglon College, Switzerland (1970-86). From 1986-95 he was Assistant History teacher at Stowe School, Buckingham, and from 1998-2014, Assistant History and Latin teacher at Wooster School, a college-preparatory school in Danbury, Connecticut (1998-2014).

== Scholarly work ==
Stunt has a scholarly interest in radical evangelicals in the early 19th century, presenting a counterbalance to church historians who report on “the ‘famous’ outgoing extroverts who ‘made their mark’”. What Stunt calls his “micro-biographical” approach is evident in his works, such as From Awakening to Secession: Radical evangelicals in Switzerland and Britain 1815-35 (2000), generally considered his “magnum opus”. It has been called a “groundbreaking” and “meticulous” study containing “a wealth of new material” which makes it “an invaluable contribution to the growing historiography of the internationalism of evangelicalism,” as well as “a reminder of the continual tension between radical movements of reform and established Christian churches.” One scholar has contended that the work contains “an abundance of individual observations that are not sufficiently coherent.” The Elusive Quest of the Spiritual Malcontent is a collection of biographical essays mostly about Brethren based on “extraordinarily thorough” research.

Some six decades after having first encountered as a schoolboy the biblical textual scholar and transitorily Brethren figure Samuel Prideaux Tregelles, Stunt published his “excellent” study of him. It has been called a “neat, compact, enthusiastic biography”, the product of a “gifted writer”. It is, said one critic, “a commentary that will last.”

== Recognition ==
- Open Exhibition scholarship for academic excellence, Sidney Sussex College (1960).
- Festschrift: Neil Dickson and T.J. Marinello (eds.), The Brethren and Mission: Essays in Honour of Timothy C.F. Stunt (Glasgow: Brethren Archivists and Historians Network, 2016).
- Fellow of the Royal Historical Society, London (elected 2017).

== Writings ==
A select bibliography of Stunt’s publications from 1963-2016 contains 181 items (books, articles, pamphlets, reviews). Most are in English, some are in Italian or French. Among these are 37 entries for the Oxford Dictionary of Biography and 62 for the Blackwell Dictionary of Evangelical Biography.

=== Books ===
- From Awakening to Secession: Radical evangelicals in Switzerland and Britain 1815-35 (2000).
- The Elusive Quest of the Spiritual Malcontent: Some Early Nineteenth-Century Ecclesiastical Mavericks (2015).
- Life and Times of Samuel Prideaux Tregelles: A Forgotten Scholar (2020).

=== Articles and pamphlets (selection) ===
- “The Victoria Institute: The First Hundred Years,” Faith and Thought: Journal of the Victoria Institute 94 (1965), 162-181.
- “James Van Sommer, an Undenominational Christian and man of prayer,” Journal of the Christian Brethren Research Fellowship no. 16 (Aug. 1967), 2-8.
- Carlo Ginzburg, Il Nicodemismo, simulazione e dissimulazione nell’Europa del ’500 (review), Evangelical Quarterly 45 (Jan. 1973), 43-47.
- “Early Brethren and the Society of Friends,” Christian Brethren Research Fellowship, Occasional Papers No. 3 (1970), 1-28.
- “The ‘Via Media’ of Teodorico Pietrocola Rossetti,” in L. Giorgi and M. Rubboli (eds.), Piero Guicciardini 1808-1886: Un reformatore religioso nell’Europa dell’Ottocento (Firenze: Leo S. Olschki, 1988), 137-158.
- “Brethren or Philistine?” Brethren Archivists and Historians Network Review 2 (2000), 13-16. On Edmund Gosse’s Father and Son (1907).
- “John Nelson Darby: Contexts and Perceptions,” in Crawford Gribben and Andrew R. Holmes (eds.), Protestant Millennialism, Evangelicalism and Irish Society (Basingstoke: Palgrave Macmillan, 2006), 83-98.
- “J.N. Darby and Tongues at Row: A Recent Manuscript Discovery,” Brethren Historical Review 12 (2016), 2-22.
- “Trinity College, John Darby and the Powerscourt Milieu,” in Joshua Searle, Kenneth G.C. Newport (eds.), Beyond the End: The Future of Millennial Studies (Sheffield: Sheffield Phoenix Press, 2012), 47-74.
- “New Source Materials for the Open Brethren in the 1850s,” Brethren Historical Review 18 (2022), 64-74.
