= Christian Devotedness =

Booklet by Anthony Norris Groves

Christian Devotedness is a small booklet written by Anthony Norris Groves and first published in 1825.

== Synopsis ==
Subtitled The Consideration of Our Savior's Precept, "Lay not up for yourselves treasures upon earth". It is a little Bible study, expounding Jesus' teaching concerning stewardship of material possessions. He exhorted all Christians to live economically, trusting God to supply their needs, and devoting their income to the cause of the Gospel.

== Impact ==
This booklet had a major impact upon George Müller and other early members of the Plymouth Brethren, and through him on James Hudson Taylor (who soon after conversion attended the Kennington meeting where Edward Cronin was local) and many other significant Christian leaders.

Groves put into personal practice the principles of Christian devotedness which he advocates in this booklet, and contended for the possibility and blessing of accepting the teachings of the Lord literally.
