= Tregelles =

Tregelles is a surname. Notable people with the surname include:

- Edwin Octavius Tregelles (1806–1886), English ironmaster, civil engineer, and Quaker minister
- Samuel Prideaux Tregelles (1813–1875), English biblical scholar, textual critic, and theologian

== See also ==
- Henry Tregelles Gillett
