= Charles Henry Mackintosh =

Irish writer and preacher

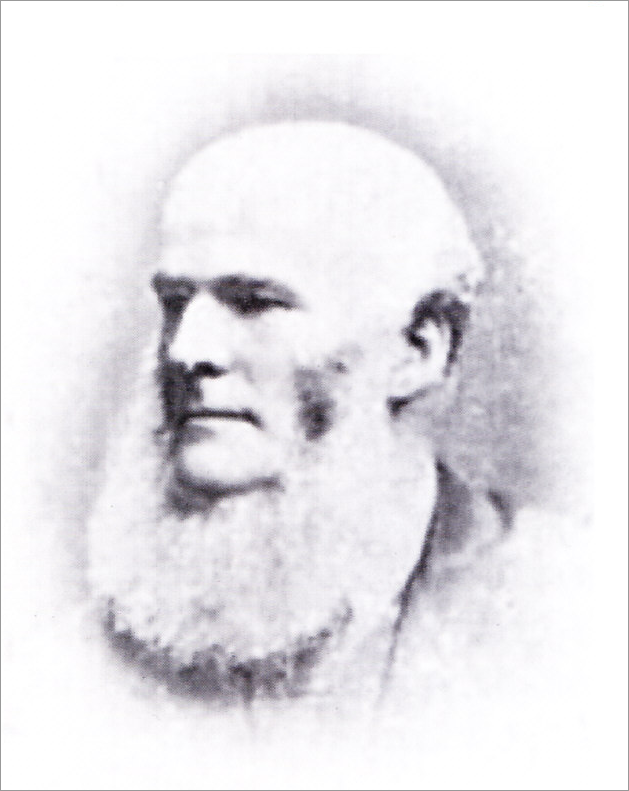
- Born: October 1820; Glenmalure Barracks, County Wicklow, Ireland
- Died: 2 November 1896 (aged 76); Cheltenham, Gloucestershire, England
- Parent: Capt. D. Mackintosh

Charles Henry Mackintosh (October 1820 – 2 November 1896) was a nineteenth-century Christian preacher, dispensationalist, writer of Bible commentaries, magazine editor and member of the Plymouth Brethren.

== Early life ==
Mackintosh was the son of Captain Duncan Mackintosh, an officer in a Highland regiment. He had a spiritual experience at age 18 through the letters of his sister and reading John Nelson Darby's Operations of the Spirit. In 1838, he went to work in a business house in Limerick, Ireland. The following year, he went to Dublin and identified himself with the Plymouth Brethren.

About 1874, Mackintosh reflecting on his course wrote, "I had not the honour of being among the first of those who planted their feet on the blessed ground occupied by Brethren. I left the Establishment about the year 1839, and took my place at the table in Dublin, where dear Bellett was ministering with great acceptance ... As a young man I, of course, walked in retirement, having no thought of coming forward in public ministry of any kind ... Indeed, I may say that nothing but the most solemn sense of responsibility could ever have induced me to stand up in public."

In 1843, Mackintosh wrote his first tract entitled Peace with God. When he was 24, he opened a private school at Westport, County Mayo, where he developed a special method of teaching classical languages. This was during the Great Famine of 1845–1850, and Mackintosh went around County Mayo preaching the gospel to the poor during school holidays. The effort required to run a boarding school in such a poor and famine-hit district caused Mackintosh to abandon the enterprise in 1853; he told John Nelson Darby that nothing could induce him to go on with a boarding school.

He tried farming for a time, but he wrote to Darby on 31 August 1853 that the Lord had "called me into larger service than ever", and he soon concluded that he must give himself entirely to preaching, writing, and public speaking.

== Author and evangelist ==
Soon after he established a periodical named Things New and Old, which he continued to edit (with evangelist Charles Stanley, 1821–1890) from 1858 to 1890, and Good News for the Little Ones, later called Good News for Young and Old and some pages for the Little Ones from 1859 to 1876.

Mackintosh took a great interest in, and actively participated in, the great Irish Evangelical revival of 1859 and 1860 (see Revivalism).

Mackintosh's literary fame rests primarily upon his work Notes on the Pentateuch, beginning with a volume of 334 pages on Genesis, and concluding with a two-volume work on Deuteronomy extending to over 800 pages. These are still in print and have been translated into a dozen or more languages.

Brethren historian Roy Coad notes:

"Another popular writer among the exclusives was an Irish schoolmaster, Charles Henry Mackintosh, who preached extensively in the revival movement. The initials 'C.H.M.' became familiar in many pious evangelical households of the later Victorian and Edwardian years. No critical scholar, Mackintosh nevertheless had a marked gift for simple Biblical exposition, and his works on the Pentateuch had an enormous vogue as simple aids to devotional interpretation for the first five books of the Bible. He was, however, no theologian, and certain isolated sentences in those books referred to 'the heavenly humanity' of Christ (and thus verged on formal heresy), brought him much hostile notice from prejudiced opponents of the Brethren (who took his writings as being far more significant and representative than they deserved). He later withdrew the expressions, on Darby's insistence."

Arno C. Gaebelein says of Mackintosh, along with other Brethren writers, "I found in [these] writings... the soul food I needed. I esteem these men next to the Apostles in their sound and spiritual teachings."

Charles Spurgeon, who crossed swords with early Plymouth Brethren on their ideas of ministry, offers the following comment on C.H. Mackintosh's Notes on Leviticus: "We do not endorse Plymouthism which pervades these notes, but they are frequently suggestive. Should be read cautiously." On his Notes on Genesis, however, Spurgeon complimented their 'precious and edifying reflections'.

Dwight L. Moody offered a view which overall was much more positive than Spurgeon, writing: "I had my attention called to C.H.M.'s notes, and was so much pleased and at the same time profited by the way they opened up the Scripture truth, that I secured at once all the writings of the same author, and if they could not be replaced, [I] would rather part with my entire library, excepting my Bible, than with these writings. They have been to me a very key to the Scriptures." He summarised the value to him of Mackintosh's writings, testifying that '...Mackintosh had the greatest influence on me."

== Closing days ==
Charles Andrew Coates wrote, "I was one of the last persons to hear C.H.M. pray. It was most touching to hear the aged and feeble Levite pouring out his heart to God, first for the whole assembly, and then for the little companies gathered everywhere to the Lord's Name. The Lord's interests were the great burden of his heart. Though he had been for a length of time incapacitated for any public service he was still keeping the charge." Mackintosh died on 2 November 1896 shortly after entering his 76th year, following increasing weakness in which he had no energy left to preach, though he had continued to write until even that was impossible. Eventually this also ceased, but his literature continued to be published. The 6th edition of Notes on the Book of Genesis was published before the year ended.

Four days later on 6 November 1896 he was buried in Cheltenham Cemetery. He was buried by the side of his wife in what is known as "the Plymouth Brethren plot", just in front of the grave of one of his converts, the hymn writer G.W. Frazer who had died in the previous January and where other prominent Plymouth Brethren of the day were buried. Dr. Walter Wolston of Edinburgh preached from Genesis 25:8–10 and Hebrews 11:8–10 at the funeral and the mourners sang J.N. Darby's hymn:

O bright and blessèd scenes,
Where sin can never come;
Whose sight our longing spirit weans
From earth, where yet we roam.

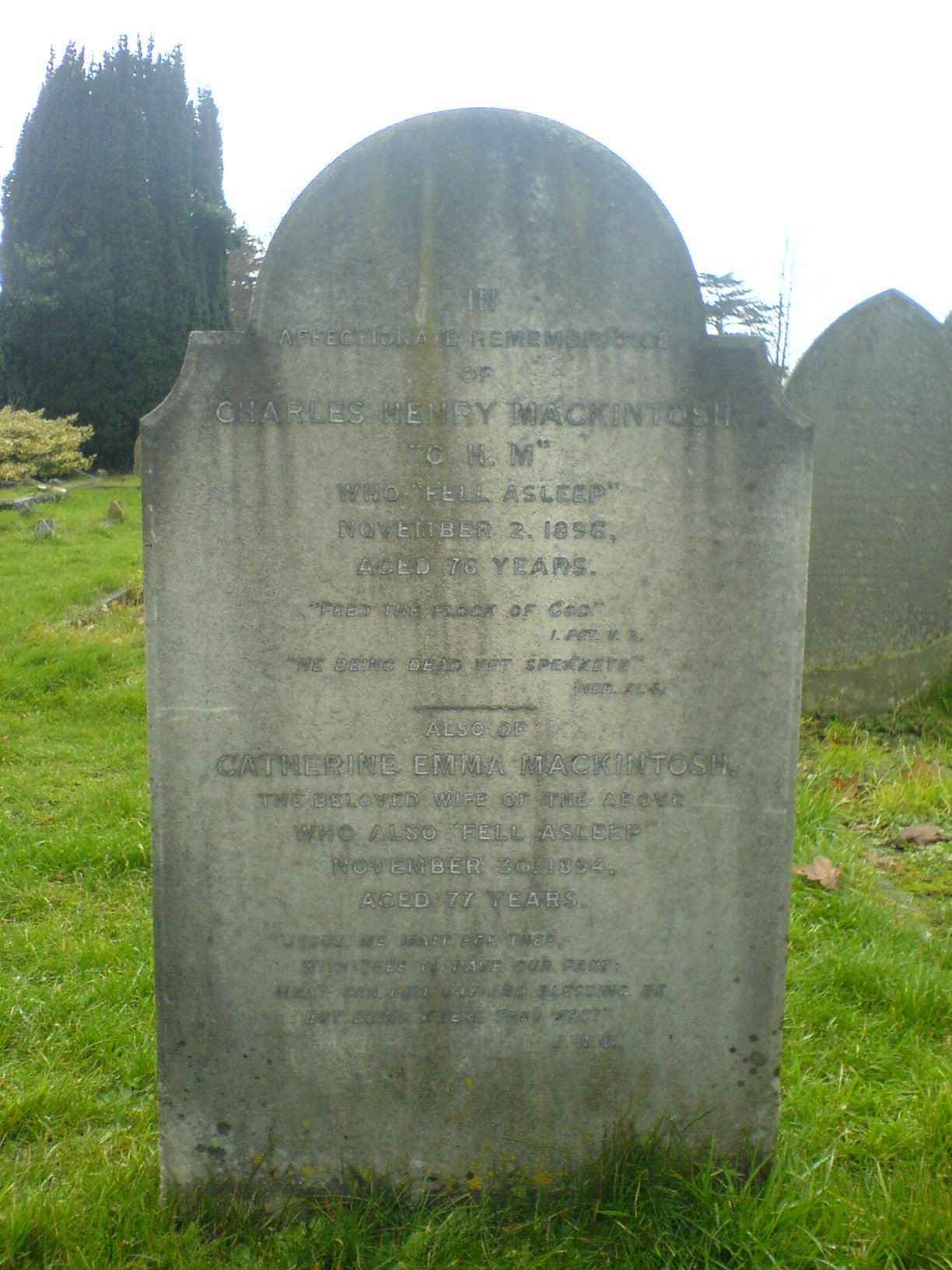
Photograph of Gravestone

The American author of a brief obituary remarked that he would not allow his "thoughts to indulge in fulsome praise (of men) – rather to recognise the grace of God vouchsafed to His servant." An Australian magazine The Message published this in its pages, "Now to tell of our beloved and honoured brother Mr Mackintosh's departure to be with Christ. He had been in failing health for twelve months, but continued the Handfuls of Pasture monthly as before – most sweet, profitable teaching. Mr Mackintosh's breathing greatly distressed him, and for some time he was not equal to going to the Meetings, or even to leaving the house, but did not take to his bed. I went as often as I could to see him. When inquiring how he was, the answer ever was – 'Just as I ought to be.' God's way was always best to him. Just six months before his own departure to be with Christ – J B Stoney, in declining health at Scarborough, said of CHM, 'He is now where love is satisfied.'"

The Scripture texts on the gravestone of Mackintosh and his wife Emma are "Feed the flock of God" (1 Peter 5:2) and "He being dead yet speaketh" (Hebrews 11:4). Beneath Emma's inscription is Darby's verse,

Jesus, we wait for Thee,
With Thee to have our part;
What can full joy and blessing be
But being where Thou art?

== Further information ==
- Noel, Napoleon (1936). The History of the Brethren. W.F. Knapp.
- Coad, Frederick Roy (1968). A History of the Brethren Movement. Paternoster.
- Cross, Edwin Norman (2011). The Life and Times of Charles Henry Mackintosh: a biography. Chapter Two.
- John Rylands University Library, Manchester, Christian Brethren Archive.
- Private Brethren Archive of Edwin Cross, Woolwich, London SE18.
