= Garbage eaters =

The term garbage eaters can refer to

- The Brethren, a secretive American religious movement
- Freeganism, an anti-consumerist lifestyle
- Refuse-eating animals, for example raccoons and urban gulls
