= Benjamin Wills Newton =

English evangelist, Christian author, and church leader

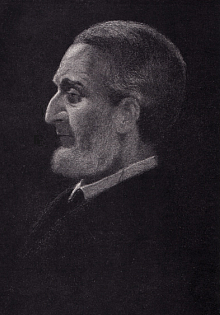
- Born: 12 December 1807; Plymouth Dock, England
- Died: 26 June 1899 (aged 91); Tunbridge Wells, England
- Occupations: Evangelist, writer

Benjamin Wills Newton (12 December 1807 – 26 June 1899) was an English evangelist, author of Christian books, and leader of a Plymouth church. His congregation and others around Plymouth became known as the Plymouth Brethren. Newton was a friend of John Nelson Darby, a well-known leader of the Plymouth Brethren, but the two men began to clash on matters of church doctrine and practice. This led to a 1848 split of the movement into the Open Brethren and Exclusive Brethren.

== Early days ==
Newton was born in Plymouth Dock, Devon in a Quaker family. His father died shortly before Benjamin was born. Newton had no siblings. He studied at Exeter College, Oxford, where he obtained a 1st Class Classics degree in 1828 and became a fellow of the college.

== Brethren assembly at Plymouth ==
At Oxford he abandoned Quaker beliefs and joined the Anglican Church. He was friends of Francis William Newman and George Wigram. Through Newman he first met John Nelson Darby. Newton and his friends in Oxford became increasingly critical of the Anglican Church especially in regard to its subjection to the sovereign state and the appointment of ordained clergy. In December 1831 Wigram left the Anglican church and bought a nonconformist place of worship, Providence Chapel in Raleigh Street, Plymouth, Devon. Meetings were open to Christians from all denominations for fellowship, prayer, praise and communion. In January 1832, Newton and Darby, although at the time, both Anglican clerics, shared communion with Wigram at such a meeting.

By March 1832 Newton had left the Anglican Church, committed himself to the new fellowship and married a local woman, Hannah Abbott. The "Providence People" as they were known locally, grew quickly, became known as “The Brethren from Plymouth” and then were referred to as the Plymouth Brethren. Around 1832 Darby also left the Anglican Church of Ireland.

The predominant features of the Plymouth assembly in 1832 included:

- Rejection of clergy and adoption of the doctrine of the priesthood of all believers
- Plurality of Elders – The elders were unpaid. Newton soon became an elder, and earned his living as a schoolteacher.
- Weekly communion
- Separation from evil systems – e. g., not being in the armed forces or a member of any apostate denominational church

The Plymouth assembly was similar to an assembly in Dublin, Ireland which was established in 1827 by Anthony Norris Groves, Darby and other Christians who sought a return of Christendom to New Testament principles. Like the Dublin assembly, which originally was anti-sectarian in that it was open to all Christian believers, the Plymouth assembly in 1832 began defining qualifications for membership and insisting that fellowship could only occur after severing any other fellowship with a denominational church. The shifting to a sectarian position was detected by Anthony Norris Groves after visiting the Brethren in Plymouth.

== Relations with Darby ==
John Nelson Darby was the dominant force in the early Brethren movement. Newton saw him as his mentor whilst Darby saw Newton as a prized disciple. It was Newton who had first invited Darby to the Plymouth Assembly in 1831 in order that the Plymouth assembly could be modelled on the assembly in Dublin. Darby, eager to evangelise and teach throughout Europe, appointed Newton as the primary elder in Plymouth. Although they were in agreement over many issues, such as the rejection of the pentecostal teachings of Edward Irving, by 1834, cracks began to develop in their relationship.

In 1834, a dispute arose over their friend, Francis Newman, who had started to hold heretical beliefs in regards to the divinity of Christ. Darby excommunicated Newman, but Newton allowed Newman to keep fellowship with the Plymouth assembly in the hope that he would be restored. In 1835, demonstrating his increasing independence of Darby, Newton stepped down as presiding elder, believing that elders should not be elected by the authority of man, as had been the case at Plymouth. Although no longer the presiding elder, his influence and leadership of the assembly continued to grow.

A bigger dispute also began to arise in the 1830s over their differing views of future events predicted in the Bible. Although both were premillennialists, Newton believed the church would go through the tribulation, while Darby became increasingly convinced in a pretribulation rapture. Newton also had a different view on dispensationalism and believed the present dispensation consists of three concurrent parts. Firstly the dispensation from Noah to the second coming of the Lord (Genesis 9:1-6), secondly the Gentile dispensation commencing with Nebuchadnezzar and also terminating with the 2nd coming of the Lord, and thirdly the New Covenant dispensation. Newton was particularly critical of Darby's belief that future events in Matthew 24 relate primarily to the Jews, after the church had been secretly raptured and said that "the Secret Rapture was bad enough, but this [John Darby's equally novel idea that the book of Matthew is on "Jewish" ground instead of "Church" ground] was worse."

Newton interpreted 1 Thessalonians 4:16 and 2 Thessalonians 2 v1-4 as proof of a non-secret posttribulation rapture. He viewed Darby's dispensational and pre-tribulation rapture teaching as "the height of speculative nonsense". Unlike Darby, he also believed that the church is made up of both Jews, including Old Testament saints, and Gentiles, who have been made one in Christ, and that Darby's scheme, followed logically, implied two distinct and separate ways to salvation.

Between 1835 and 1845, Darby spent much of his time in Continental Europe, while the assembly in Plymouth had grown to over 1000 people, with the condition of the assembly being likened to "heaven on earth". In 1840, a larger chapel in Ebrington Street, Plymouth was built and used for the main worship services, while Providence Chapel was retained for smaller meetings such as evangelistic services.

In 1843, Darby briefly visited Plymouth and tensions with Newton grew. Darby was dismayed by the state of the assembly, which, in his absence, he saw as having shifted from the priesthood of all believers towards the establishment of official clergy. The doctrinal dispute over future events was intensified by the 1842 publication of Newton's Thoughts on the Apocalypse, which in 1843 received a hostile 490-page review from Darby.

In March 1845, Darby fled from Switzerland due to a threat of revolution in Geneva and travelled to Plymouth to "battle for the soul of Brethrenism". A war of words escalated into a pamphlet war over eschatology, the priesthood of all believers together with the role of assembly leaders. Darby had by then developed strong views against formal recognition of elders. Also in dispute was whether, as Newton believed, each assembly was independent and autonomous, or as Darby believed, formed connected and integral parts of a universal body. Darby and Newton had strong, intransigent personalities that exacerbated the situation. The dispute became personal, with Darby exiting from fellowship with the Plymouth assembly and publicly accusing Newton of deception and dishonesty. These charges against Newton were investigated by the elders at Ebrington Street and dismissed.

Although most of the Plymouth assembly, at this stage, supported Newton, Darby had some support, particularly from Wigram, by then living in London, who had earlier financed the purchase of the Raleigh Street and Ebrington Street premises. In December 1845, Wigram wrote to the Plymouth elders formally withdrawing his fellowship from Ebrington Street and revoking his loan of the Raleigh Street chapel. The use of Raleigh Street was given to Darby and his supporters, resulting in two local brethren assemblies at odds with each other. Both parties continued with the dispute and were eager to explain their position to other brethren assemblies which were springing up throughout the country. In 1846, while Newton was travelling around London holding private meetings, partly to answer charges against him by Darby, a brethren assembly in Rawthorne Street, London, where Wigram was leader, requested Newton to attend a meeting, so that the charges against him could again be looked into. Newton, backed by the Ebrington Street meeting, declined their persistent requests to attend, and was subsequently excommunicated by Rawthorne Street.

In 1847 the Darby party discovered that Newton, first in an article printed in 1835, had taught heretical doctrine on the Person of Christ. The article appeared as a rebuttal of Edward Irving's heretical teachings on the Person of Christ, which had gained popularity. Newton believed that Christ, though perfect, experienced sufferings before the day of Crucifixion, not for the sake of others, but due to his association through his mother with Adam and his descendants, and more specifically with the apostate nation of Israel. So Christ, according to Newton, suffered hunger and pain and had a mortal body. Darby and his supporters seized the chance to condemn Newton as a heretic. Although Newton apologised and retracted his "Adamic error", and withdrew for consideration his views on the sufferings of Christ, some of the elders at Ebrington Street began to lose confidence in him. Darby was not satisfied at this, allegedly due to the lack of repentance shown by Newton or as Henry Groves, the son of Anthony Norris Groves, another eminent Brethren leader said, that Darby was "bent on ruling" and wanted to be rid of his rival. Darby's persistence in the matter and Newton's refusal to retaliate, but rather to "turn the other cheek", allowed Darby to win over the elders who had supported Newton, leaving him isolated. In December 1847, Newton permanently left the brethren movement and moved to London, where he established an independent meeting.

The feud led to the division of the Plymouth Brethren in 1848, when George Muller, co-leader of Bethesda chapel, a brethren assembly in Bristol, allowed visitors from Ebrington Street into fellowship in Bristol and was slow to comply with Darby's ultimatum for all assemblies to condemn Newton's heresy. Darby, in response, excommunicated all those in fellowship at Bethesda. The assemblies which supported Darby's action became known as the Exclusive Brethren and those which rallied behind George Muller and Bethesda chapel, subsequently also excommunicated, were named Open Brethren.

In 1858, Darby was also accused of holding a similar heresy to that of Newton's on the sufferings of Christ.

== Post-Brethren years ==
Newton married Maria Hawkins in 1849, his first wife having died in 1846. His only child died at the age of five in 1855.

Throughout the next 50 years, Newton remained active as a Christian teacher and writer. After leaving the Plymouth Brethren, he set up an independent chapel in Bayswater, London. He later lived in Orpington, Kent, followed by Newport, Isle of Wight. For the last three years of his life he lived in Tunbridge Wells.

Although he was labelled as an evil-doer and a false teacher by the Darbyites, other people view Newton as the John Calvin of the 19th century and believe the Brethren movement might have done better if it had followed his teaching rather than Darby's dispensationalism and the belief that at any moment, the pre-tribulation secret return of the Lord for the secret rapture of the saints to heaven to occur, and the Lord to return publicly with the church seven years later for the commencement of a thousand-year reign.

His friends and supporters during the years of relentless vilification by the Darbyites included Samuel Prideaux Tregelles, George Muller and Charles Spurgeon. Historian Roy Coad notes, "He lived until 1899, retreating into a little circle of two or three churches of his own, and leaving a devoted following, mainly among Strict Baptists."

As a writer Newton produced more than 200 published works. His great gift was exposition of the Scriptures and, particularly, unfulfilled prophecy.

== George Muller ==
George Muller of Bristol wrote, "I consider Mr. Newton's writings to be most sound and scriptural, and my wife and I are in the habit of reading them, not only with the deepest interest, but great profit to our souls. His books are certainly most valuable, for they exalt the person and work of our blessed Lord Jesus Christ to the very utmost. If anyone honestly wishes to know what Mr. Newton's views really are, let him carefully and attentively read some of his principle writings through, such as Salvation by Substitution; Atonement and its Result; Gospel Truths, from which he will clearly see, not only that Mr. Newton is sound in the faith, but also that his teaching is of a most valuable character.... I regard Mr. Newton as the most accurate writer on religious themes of the nineteenth century."

== Works ==
The Sovereign Grace Advent Testimony organisation supports the written works of Newton and references the following books and booklets, together with writings by other like minded Christians :-

- Gospel Truths, 1885
- Thoughts on the Apocalypse, 1853
- Occasional papers on scriptural subjects, 1866
- Doctrines of Popery, 1867
- Prospects of the ten Kingdoms of the Roman Empire considered : being the third series of aids to prophetic inquiry, 1873
- Aids to prophetic inquiry, 1881
- Thoughts on parts of the Songs of Solomon, 1906
- Christendom, Its Course and Doom, 1876
- Events To Precede the return of our Lord
- The Day of the Lord in Zechariah Chapter 14
- The Millennium: Distinctions which make Difficulties Disappear
- Patmos Series
- Narratives From The Old Testament, 1886
- Thoughts on Scriptural Subjects, 1871
- Thoughts on parts of Leviticus, 2nd Edition 1857
- The Perfect Sacrifice by B.W. Newton, Publisher: University of Michigan Library, 2006 ISBN 1-4255-1433-2
- B.W.Newton on Ministry and Order in the Church of Christ, Pearl Publications, 1997 ISBN 1-901397-00-9
