= George Müller =

German-English clergyman (1805–1898)

The Reverend George Müller
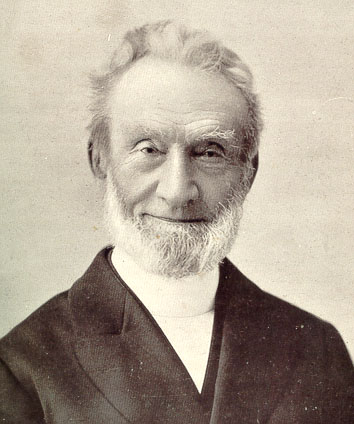
- Born: Johann Georg Ferdinand Müller; 27 September 1805; Kroppenstedt, Kingdom of Prussia (now Saxony-Anhalt, Germany)
- Died: 10 March 1898 (aged 92); Bristol, England
- Education: Cathedral Classical School, Halberstadt
- Occupations: Evangelist and missionary, Director of Orphan Houses
- Spouse(s): Mary Groves (7 Oct 1830 – 6 Feb 1870, her death); Susannah Grace Sanger (30 Nov 1871 – 13 Jan 1894, her death)
- Children: Lydia (17 Sep 1832 – 10 Jan 1890); Elijah (19 Mar 1834 – 26 Jun 1835).
- Parent(s): Johann Friedrich Müller (Oct 1768 – 20 Mar 1840), Sophie Eleonore Müller (née Hasse; Apr 1771 – 16 Jan 1820).

Religious life
- Religion: Christianity
- Denomination: Open Brethren

George Müller (born Johann Georg Ferdinand Müller, 27 September 1805 – 10 March 1898) was a Christian evangelist and the director of the Ashley Down orphanage in Bristol, England. He was one of the founders of the Plymouth Brethren movement. Later during the split, his group was called the Open Brethren.

He cared for 10,024 orphans during his lifetime, and provided educational opportunities for the orphans to the point that he was even accused by some of raising the poor above their natural station in British life. He established 117 schools which offered Christian education to more than 120,000 people.

== Early work ==
In 1829, Müller offered to work with the Jews in England through the London Society for Promoting Christianity Amongst the Jews. He arrived in London on 19 March of that year, but by mid-May, he fell ill and did not think that he would survive. He was sent to Teignmouth to recuperate and, while there he met Henry Craik, who became his lifelong friend. Müller returned to London in September, but after ten days started to feel unwell again. He blamed his failing health on his having been confined to his house because of his studies. He asked the Society to send him out to preach but received no reply. By the end of November, he became doubtful whether the Society was the right place for him and on 12 December made the decision to leave but to wait for a month before writing. Müller returned to Exmouth in East Devon, England on 31 December for a short holiday and preached at various meetings while there. He wrote to the Society in early January, requesting that they might consider allowing him to remain with them if they would allow him "to labor in regard to time and place as the Lord might direct me". This they refused to do at a meeting on 27 January 1830, communicating this to Müller in writing, and thus bringing to an end his association with the London Society. He moved from Exmouth to Teignmouth and preached several times for Craik, which led to a number of the congregation asking him to stay and be the minister of Ebenezer Chapel in Shaldon, Devon, on a salary of £55 per annum. On 7 October 1830, he married Mary Groves, the sister of Anthony Norris Groves. At the end of October, he renounced his regular salary, believing that the practice could lead to church members giving out of duty, not desire. He also eliminated the renting of church pews, arguing that it gave unfair prestige to the wealthy (based primarily on James 2:1–9).

Müller moved to Bristol, England on 25 May 1832, to begin working at Bethesda Chapel. Along with Henry Craik, he continued preaching there until his death, even while devoted to his other ministries. In 1834, he founded the Scriptural Knowledge Institution for Home and Abroad, with the goal of aiding Christian schools and missionaries; distributing the Bible and Christian tracts; and providing Day-schools, Sunday-schools and Adult-schools, all upon a Scriptural foundation. By the end of February 1835, there were five Day-schools – two for boys and three for girls. Not receiving government support and only accepting unsolicited gifts, this organisation received and disbursed £1,381,171 – around £113 million in today's terms – by the time of Müller's death, primarily using the money for supporting the orphanages and distributing about 285,407 Bibles, 1,459,506 New Testaments, and 244,351 other religious texts, which were translated into twenty other languages. The money was also used to support other "faith missionaries" around the world, such as Hudson Taylor. The work continues to this day.

== Orphanages ==
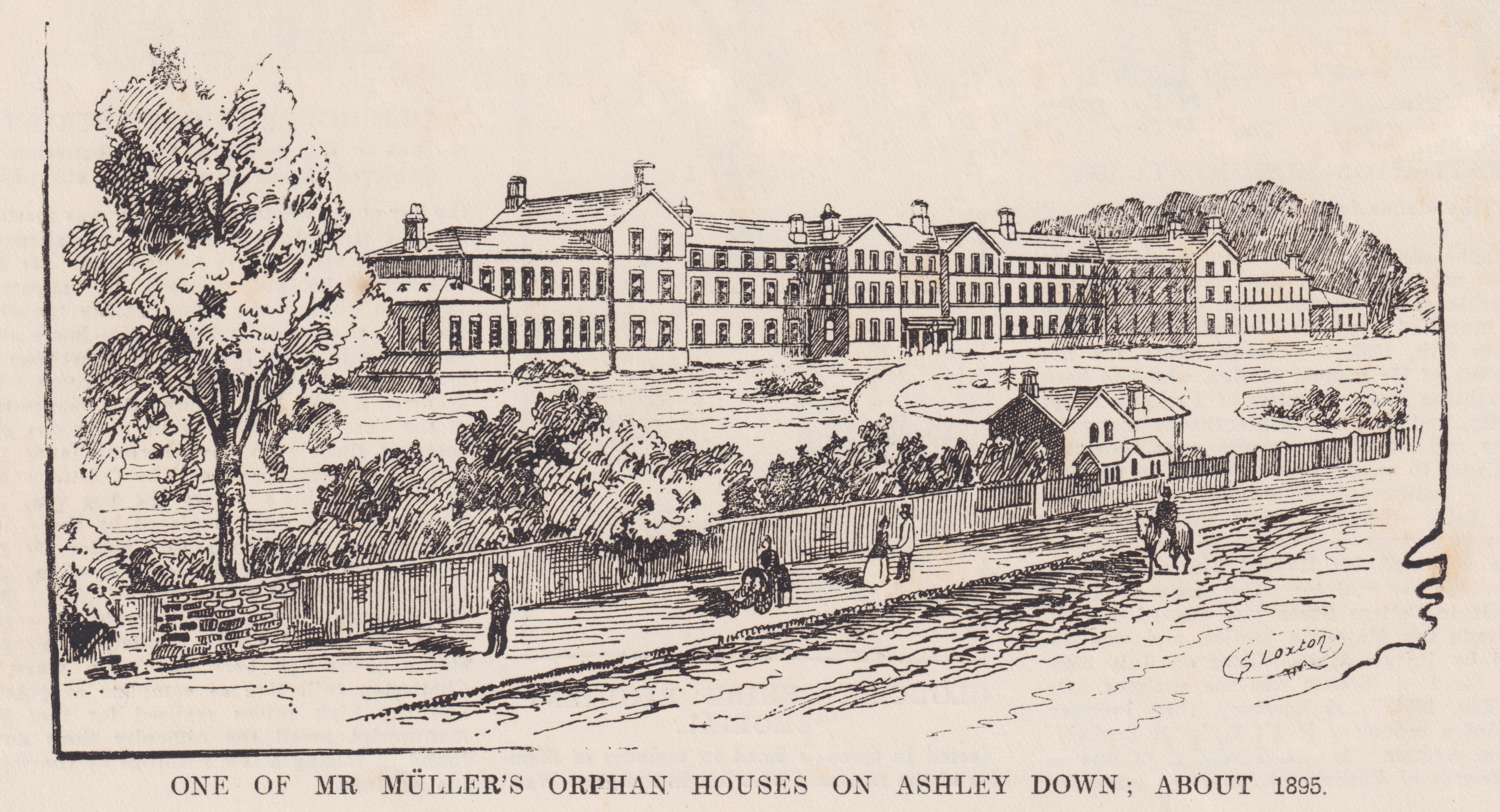
Müller's orphanage on Ashley Down Road, Bristol, 1895

The work of Müller and his wife with orphans began in 1836, with the preparation of their own rented home at 6 Wilson Street, Bristol for the accommodation of thirty girls. Soon after, three more houses in Wilson Street were furnished, not only for girls but also for boys and younger children, eventually increasing the capacity for children who could be cared for to 130.

In 1845, as growth continued, the neighbours complained about the noise and disruption to the public utilities, so Müller decided that a separate building designed to house three hundred children was necessary, and in 1849, at Ashley Down, Bristol, the new home opened. The architect commissioned to draw up the plans asked if he might do so gratuitously. By 26 May 1870, 1,722 children were being accommodated in 5 homes, although there was room for 2,050 (No 1 House – 300, No 2 House – 400, Nos 3, 4 and 5 – 458 each). By the following year, there were 280 orphans in No 1 House, 356 in No 2, 450 in Nos 3 and 4, and 309 in No 5 House.

Through all this, Müller never made requests for financial support, nor did he go into debt, even though the five homes cost more than £100,000 to build. Many times, he received unsolicited food donations only hours before they were needed to feed the children, further strengthening his faith in God. Müller was in constant prayer that God touched the hearts of donors to make provisions for the orphans. For example, on one well-documented occasion, thanks was given for breakfast when all the children were sitting at the table even though there was nothing to eat in the house. As they finished praying, the baker knocked on the door with sufficient fresh bread to feed everyone, and the milkman gave them plenty of fresh milk because his cart had broken down in front of the orphanage. In his autobiographical entry for 12 February 1842, he wrote:

A brother in the Lord came to me this morning and, after a few minutes of conversation gave me two thousand pounds for furnishing the new Orphan House ... Now I am able to meet all of the expenses. In all probability, I will even have several hundred pounds more than I need. The Lord not only gives as much as is absolutely necessary for his work, but he gives abundantly. This blessing filled me with inexplicable delight. He had given me the full answer to my thousands of prayers during the [past] 1,195 days.

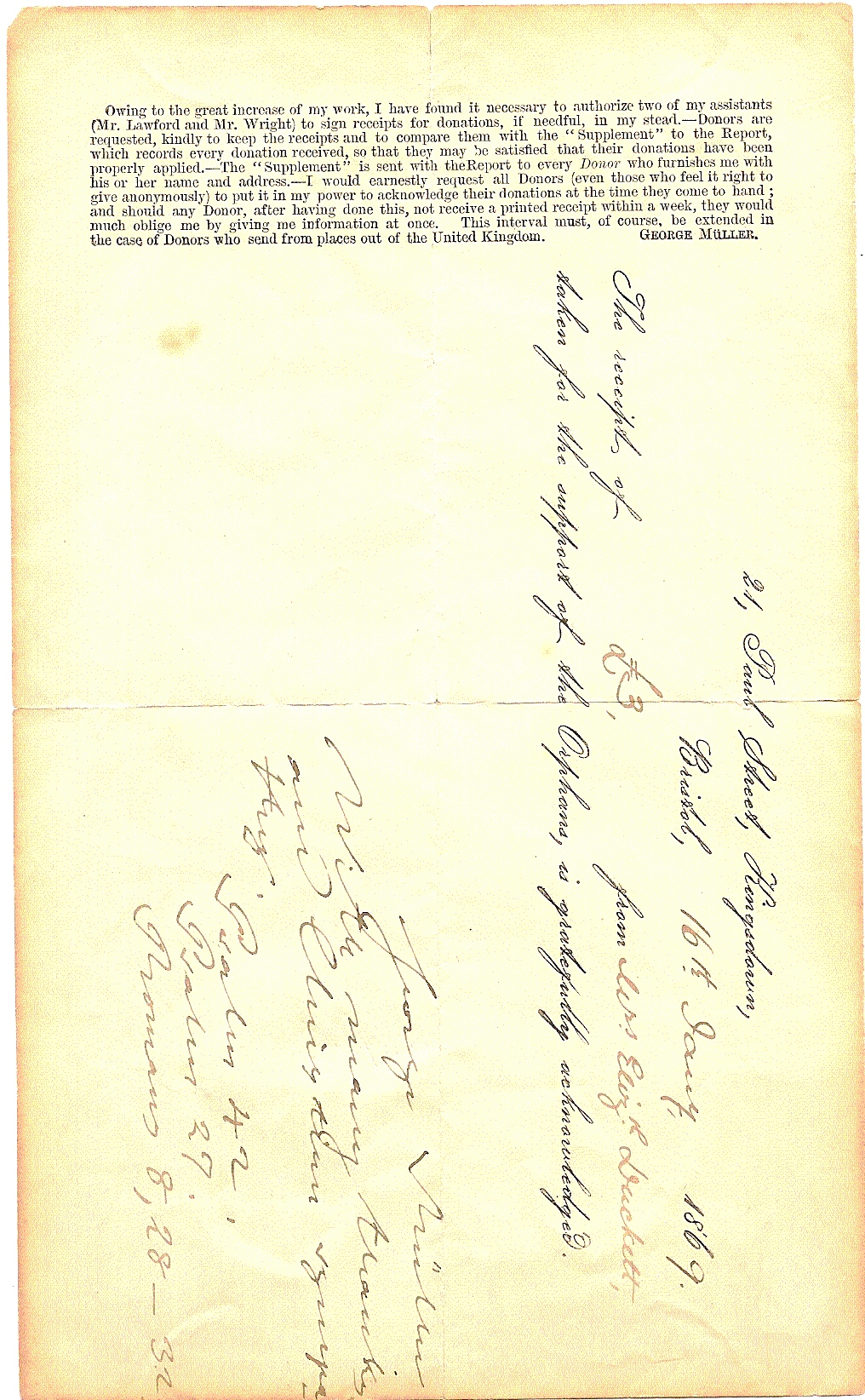
Receipt form issued by George Müller

Müller never sought donations from specific individuals and relied on the Almighty for all of his needs. He asked those who did support his work to give a name and address so that he could prepare a receipt. The receipts were printed with a request that the receipt be kept until the next annual report was issued so that the donor might confirm the amount reported with what he had given. The wording in the image reads: "Owing to the great increase of my work, I have found it necessary to authorize two of my assistants (Mr. Lawford and Mr. Wright) to sign receipts for donations, if needful, in my stead. Donors are requested, kindly to keep the receipts and to compare them with the "Supplement" to the Report, which records every donation received, so that they may be satisfied that their donations have been properly applied.-The "Supplement" is sent with the Report to every Donor who furnishes me with his or her name and address.-I would earnestly request all Donors (even those who feel it right to give anonymously) to put it in my power to acknowledge their donations at the time they come to hand; and should any Donor, after having done this, not receive a printed receipt within a week, they would much oblige me by giving me information at once. This interval must, of course, be extended in the case of Donors who send from places out of the United Kingdom. George Müller". Every single gift was recorded, whether a single farthing, £3,000, or an old teaspoon. Accounting records were scrupulously kept and made available for scrutiny.

Every morning after breakfast there was a time of Bible reading and prayer, and every child was given a Bible upon leaving the orphanage, together with a tin trunk containing two changes of clothing. The children were dressed well and educated – Müller even employed an inspector to maintain high standards. In fact, many claimed that nearby factories and mines were unable to obtain enough workers because of his efforts in securing apprenticeships, professional training, and domestic service positions for the children old enough to leave the orphanage.

== Evangelism ==
On 26 March 1875, at the age of 71 and after the death of his first wife in 1870 and his marriage to Susannah Grace Sanger in 1871, Müller and Susannah began a 17-year period of missionary travel. The table below gives a list of the dates and destinations of their journey.

From	To	Itinerary
26 March 1875	6 July 1875	England
15 August 1875	5 July 1876	England, Scotland and Ireland
16 August 1876	25 June 1877	Switzerland, Germany and the Netherlands
18 August 1877	8 July 1878	Canada and the United States (including a visit to the White House)
5 September 1878	18 June 1879	Switzerland, France, Spain and Italy
27 August 1879	17 June 1880	United States and Canada
15 September 1880	31 May 1881	Canada and the United States
23 August 1881	30 May 1882	Egypt, Palestine, Syria, Asia Minor, Turkey and Greece
8 August 1882	1 June 1883	Germany, Austria, Hungary, Bohemia, Russia and Poland
26 September 1883	5 June 1884	India
18 August 1884	2 October 1884	England and South Wales
16 May 1885	1 July 1885	England
1 September 1885	3 October 1885	England and Scotland
4 November 1885	13 June 1887	The United States, Australia, China, Japan, the Straits of Malacca, Singapore, Penang, Colombo, France
10 August 1887	11 March 1890	Australia, Tasmania, New Zealand, Ceylon and India
8 August 1890	May 1892	Germany, Switzerland, Austria and Italy

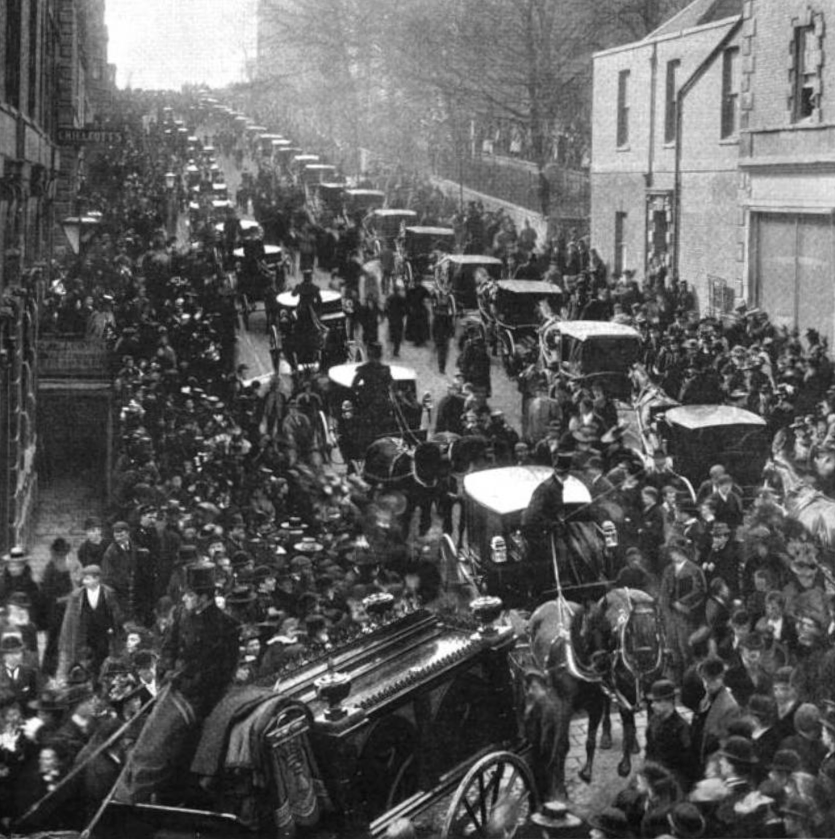
Müller's funeral procession in Bristol

Müller always expected to pay for their fares and accommodation from the unsolicited gifts given for his own use. However, if someone offered to pay his hotel bill en route, Müller recorded this amount in his accounts.

He travelled more than 200,000 miles. His language abilities allowed him to preach in English, French, and German, and his sermons were translated into the host languages when he was unable to use the three languages which he spoke. In 1892, he returned to England, where he died on 10 March 1898 in New Orphan House No 3.

He was buried at Arnos Vale Cemetery in Bristol. His funeral was attended by 10,000 people, including 1,500 children from orphanages he established.

== Theology ==
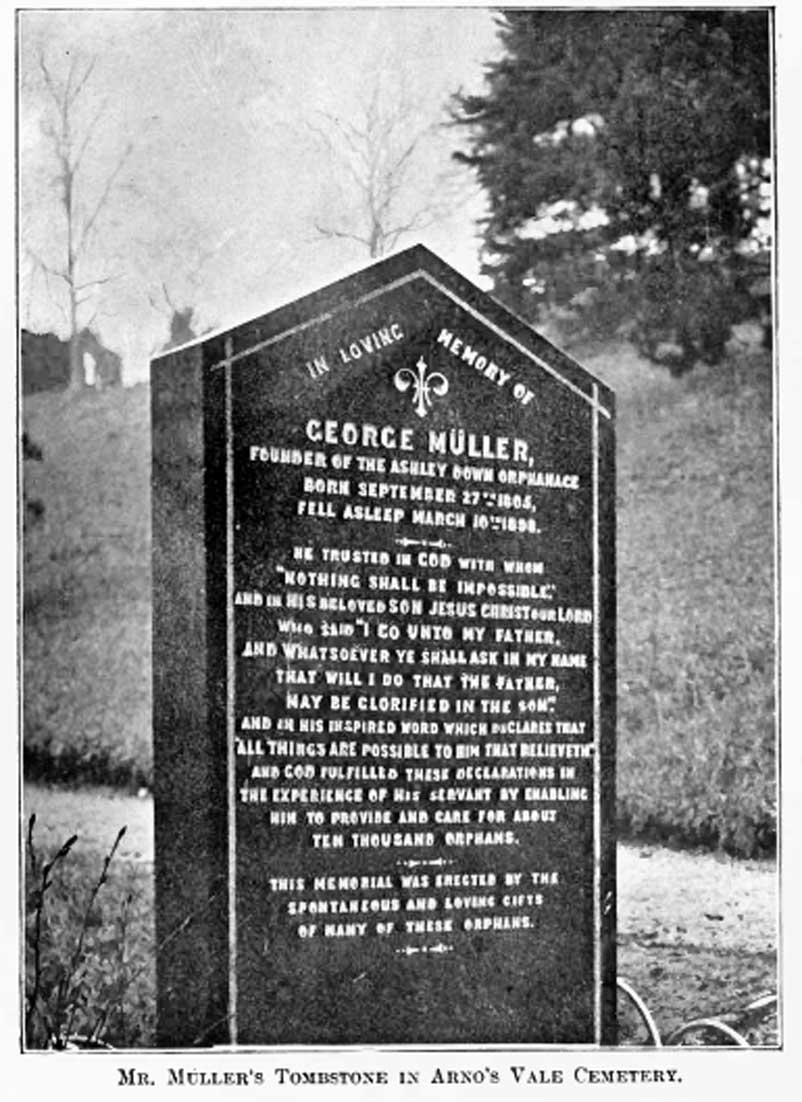
George Müller's tombstone

The theology that guided George Müller's work is not widely known, but was shaped by an experience in his middle twenties when he "came to prize the Bible alone as [his] standard of judgement".

He records in his Narratives

[...] That the word of God alone is our standard of judgment in spiritual things; that it can be explained only by the Holy Spirit; and that in our day, as well as in former times, he is the teacher of his people. The office of the Holy Spirit I had not experimentally understood before that time. Indeed, of the office of each of the blessed persons, in what is commonly called the Trinity, I had no experimental apprehension. I had not before seen from the Scriptures that the Father chose us before the foundation of the world; that in him that wonderful plan of our redemption originated, and that he also appointed all the means by which it was to be brought about. Further, that the Son, to save us, had fulfilled the law, to satisfy its demands, and with it also the holiness of God; that he had borne the punishment due to our sins, and had thus satisfied the justice of God. And, further, that the Holy Spirit alone can teach us about our state by nature, show us the need of a Saviour, enable us to believe in Christ, explain to us the Scriptures, help us in preaching, etc. It was my beginning to understand this latter point in particular which had a great effect on me; for the Lord enabled me to put it to the test of experience, by laying aside commentaries, and almost every other book, and simply reading the word of God and studying it. The result of this was, that the first evening that I shut myself into my room, to give myself to prayer and meditation over the Scriptures, I learned more in a few hours than I had done during a period of several months previously. But the particular difference was, that I received real strength for my soul in doing so. I now began to try by the test of the Scriptures the things which I had learned and seen, and found that only those principles which stood the test were really of value.

Müller also wrote of how he came to believe in the doctrines of election, particular redemption, and final persevering grace while staying in Teignmouth, Devon in 1829. George Müller was a founding member of the Plymouth Brethren movement. Doctrinal differences arose in the 1840s and Müller was determined to determine the truth by the "infallible standard of the Holy Spirit". At the time, he and Craik were pastors of the Bethesda and Gideon fellowships in Bristol. Membership at Gideon was open to all believers, while only believers who had been baptised could claim full membership of Bethesda, although all believers were welcome at Communion. Müller consulted Robert C Chapman on the issue of accepting unbaptised believers, and Chapman stated that distinction should be made between unbaptised believers who "walked disorderly" and those who lived according to the Bible. Müller and Craik independently contemplated the issue and decided that unbaptised believers, who otherwise lived according to Scriptural principles, should not be denied membership.

Dissension arose at Gideon regarding the presence of unbelievers at communion and the view held by some that pews were private property. Eventually, Müller and Craik withdrew from this fellowship on 19 April 1840, concentrating thereafter on the Bethesda Chapel.

John Nelson Darby and Benjamin Wills Newton became opposed concerning certain matters of doctrine and a discussion was held in Plymouth on 5 December 1845. A document entitled The Principles of Open Brethren stated: "Certain tracts issued by Mr. Newton were judged to contain error regarding the nature of the Lord Jesus Christ, and the question arose whether it was sufficient to exclude from the fellowship those who held the erroneous teaching, or whether all who belonged to a gathering where the error was tolerated were to be put outside the pale, even if they themselves had not embraced it. One party, led by Mr Darby, took the latter view. Others, in particular the Bethesda Church, in which Messrs Müller and Craik ministered, refused to admit any who were convicted of holding the evil doctrine themselves but did not exclude those who came from Mr Newton's meeting. The exclusive party thereupon declined to have any further fellowship with members of the Bethesda Church or others like-minded. The latter soon came to receive the title of 'Open Brethren'." The more exclusive side of the brethren movement became known as the Exclusive Brethren and was led by Darby. Darby called on Müller in July 1849 to discuss the split, but Müller had many prior engagements and could only receive Darby for 10 minutes. It was impossible to fully discuss the problem in such a short time, and the two men never met again.

Though the pre-tribulational rapture doctrine gained momentum as a result of the literature of the Brethren movement, Müller's church was wary of such teachings. George Müller held to a posttribulation rapture doctrine along with others such as Benjamin Wills Newton and Samuel Prideaux Tregelles, and said that "scripture declares plainly that the Lord Jesus will not come until the Apostasy shall have taken place, and the man of sin shall have been revealed..."

Müller wrote frequently about the stewardship of money and the non-reliance on earthly riches, and how God would bless the man who kept to these principles and felt that laying his own experiences bare would prove the truth of his claims. His personal income, from unsolicited gifts (he refused any kind of salary) rose from £151 in 1831 to more than £2,000 in 1870. However, he retained only around £300 a year for himself and his family, the rest he gave away.

William Henry Harding said, "The world, dull of understanding, has even yet not really grasped the mighty principle upon which he [Müller] acted, but is inclined to think of him merely as a nice old gentleman who loved children, a sort of glorified guardian of the poor, who with the passing of the years may safely be spoken of, in the language of newspaper headlines, as a 'prophet of philanthropy.' To describe him thus, however, is to degrade his memory, is to miss the high spiritual aim and the wonderful spiritual lesson of his life. It is because the carnal mind is incapable of apprehending spiritual truth that the world regards the orphan Houses only with the languid interest of mere humanitarianism, and remains oblivious of their extraordinary witness to the faithfulness of God."

== Personal life ==
His name is frequently spelled as "Mueller", particularly in the United States. Whilst "Mueller" is a possible substitute spelling for "Müller" in German, George Müller never changed his name from the original spelling and always took care to place the two dots over the letter "u" to form the umlaut. When asked by his nephew, Edward Groves, what difference this made to the pronunciation, Müller pronounced his name as though it was spelt "Meller".

=== Youth ===
Müller was born in Kroppenstädt (now Kroppenstedt), a village near Halberstadt in the Kingdom of Prussia. In 1810, the Müller family moved to nearby Heimersleben, where Müller's father was appointed a collector of taxes. He had an older brother, Friedrich Johann Wilhelm (1803 – 7 Oct 1838) and, after his widowed father remarried, a half-brother, Franz (b 1822).

His early life was not marked by righteousness – on the contrary, he was a thief, a liar and a gambler. By the age of 10, Müller was stealing government money from his father. While his mother was dying, he, at fourteen years of age, was playing cards with friends and drinking. While in seminary at the University of Halle in Germany, Müller described his status as one of

"wicked behaviour and unrepentant spirit ... Despite my sinful lifestyle and cold heart, God had mercy on me. I was as careless as ever. I had no Bible and had not read any Scripture for years. I seldom went to church; and, out of custom only, I took the Lord's Supper twice a year. I never heard the gospel preached. Nobody told me that Jesus meant for Christians, by the help of God, to live according to the Holy Scriptures." ...

Then Müller attended a prayer meeting in a private home in 1825 which so moved him that a swift transformation began in his behaviour. "I have no doubt ... that He began a work of grace in me. Even though I scarcely had any knowledge of who God truly was, that evening was the turning point in my life."

Müller's father hoped to provide him with a religious education that would allow him to take a lucrative position as a clergyman in the state church. He studied divinity at Halle and there met a fellow student, Beta, who invited him to the Christian prayer meeting which changed Müller's perspective. He was welcomed and began regularly reading the Bible and discussing Christianity with the others in attendance. After seeing a man on his knees praying to God, he was convinced of his need for salvation. He went to his bed, knelt and prayed, and asked God to help him in his life and to bless him wherever he went and to forgive him of his sins. He immediately stopped drinking, stealing and lying, and developed hope of becoming a missionary, rather than the comfortable clergyman that his father had envisioned for him. He began preaching regularly in nearby churches.

=== A Life of Prayer ===
Müller prayed about everything and expected each prayer to be answered. One example was when one of the orphan house's boiler stopped working; Müller needed to have it fixed. This was a problem because the boiler was bricked up and the weather was worsening with each day. So he prayed for two things; firstly that the workers he had hired would have a mind to work throughout the night, and secondly that the weather would let up. On the Tuesday before the work was due to commence, a bitter north wind still blew but in the morning, before the workmen arrived, a southerly wind began to blow and it was so mild that no fires were needed to heat the buildings. That evening, the foreman of the contracted company attended the site to see how he might speed things along and instructed the men to report back first thing in the morning to make an early resumption of work. The team leader stated that they would prefer to work through the night. The job was done in thirty hours.

In 1862, it was discovered that one of the drains was blocked. Being some 11 feet underground, workmen were unable to find the blockage despite several attempts. Müller prayed about the situation and the workmen at once found the site of the problem.

Strong gales in Bristol on Saturday 14 January 1865 caused considerable damage in the area and over twenty holes were opened in the roofs. About twenty windows were also broken and two frames damaged by falling slates. The glazier and slater normally employed had already committed their staff to other work so nothing could be done until the Monday. Had the winds continued, with heavy rain, the damage to the orphanage would have been much greater. After much prayer, the wind stopped in the afternoon and no rain fell until Wednesday, by which time most of the damage had been repaired.

Once, while crossing the Atlantic on the SS Sardinian in August 1877, his ship ran into thick fog. He explained to the captain that he needed to be in Quebec by the following afternoon, but Captain Joseph E. Dutton said that he was slowing the ship down for safety and Müller's appointment would have to be missed. Müller asked to use the chart-room to pray for the lifting of the fog. The captain followed him down, claiming it would be a waste of time. After Müller prayed a very simple prayer, the captain started to pray, but Müller stopped him; partly because of the captain's unbelief, but mainly because he believed the prayer had already been answered. Müller said, "Captain, I have known my Lord for more than fifty years and there is not one instance that I have failed to have an audience with the King. Get up, Captain, for you will find that the fog has gone." When the two men went back to the bridge, they found the fog had indeed lifted, and Müller was able to keep his appointment. The captain became a Christian shortly afterwards and was later known as "Holy Joe."

Müller's faith in God strengthened day by day and he spent hours in daily prayer and Bible reading. Indeed, it was his practice, in later years, to read through the entire Bible four times a year.

== The George Müller Charitable Trust ==
After his life, his work was continued by The George Müller Foundation, which was renamed The George Müller Charitable Trust on 1 March 2009. The Trust maintains the key principle of seeking money through prayer alone – it actively shuns fund-raising activities. The charity works together with local churches in the Bristol area to enable them to reach out and care for their communities, especially children, young people and families with physical, emotional, social or spiritual needs; and encourages giving to support mission, social care, relief and development work across the world. From 1986 to September 2010, it also provided residential care for the elderly in Tilsley House, Weston-super-Mare. The Trust continued to maintain a sheltered accommodation unit for the elderly in Tranquil House, next-door to Tilsley House, until it was closed in 2012.

A small museum maintained by the Trust at its headquarters in Cotham Park, Bristol, is open by appointment only. Records of all children who passed through the orphanage are held and may be inspected by relatives for a modest fee.

== In Media ==
A television docudrama was released in 2006 entitled Robber of the Cruel Streets, which presents the life and ministry of George Muller. Beginning with his unprincipled reprobate lifestyle, it relates his subsequent conversion to Christ and life-long mission to rescue street orphans in England during the time of Charles Dickens and Oliver Twist.

== See also ==
- The Open Brethren
- Arthur Tappan Pierson, Müller's biographer and friend
