= Jimmie T. Roberts =

American Christian preacher (1939-2015)

Jim Roberts
- Title: Brother Evangelist

Personal life
- Born: June 5, 1939 Paris, Tennessee, U.S.
- Died: December 6, 2015 (aged 76) Denver, Colorado, U.S.

Religious life
- Religion: Christian

Senior posting
- Based in: United States
- Period in office: 1971–2015

Jimmie T. Roberts (June 5, 1939 – December 6, 2015) was the founder of a religious movement known as The Brethren. Within the group, it is alternatively referred to as the Brothers, the Church, the Assembly, and The Body of Christ.

Roberts was born in the American South, the son of a part-time Pentecostal preacher. He later joined the United States Marine Corps. Around 1970, He became convinced that mainstream churches had become corrupt and that the last days were imminent. Roberts began recruiting followers to his apocalyptic views, advocating a lifestyle based upon an itinerant example he found in the New Testament accounts of Jesus sending forth disciples. Within the movement, he is known as "Brother Evangelist" and "the Elder".

After several incidents during the late 1970s and early 1980s, both Roberts and the group became extremely secretive and disappeared from public view, except for occasional mentions in books and the media.

Roberts died in Denver, Colorado on December 6, 2015. He was 76 years old and his cause of death is listed as metastatic adenocarcinoma.

== Bibliography ==
=== References ===
- Melton, J. Gordon (2003). Encyclopedia of American Religions (Seventh ed.). Farmington Hills, Michigan: The Gale Group, Inc. ISBN 0-7876-6384-0.
- Walker, James K. (2007). The Concise Guide to Today's Religions and Spirituality. Eugene, Oregon: Harvest House Publishers. ISBN 978-0-7369-2011-7.
