= John Gifford Bellett =

- Born: 19 July 1795; Dublin, Ireland
- Died: 10 October 1864
- Occupations: Writer, theologian

John Gifford Bellett (19 July 1795 – 10 October 1864) was an Irish Christian writer and theologian, and was influential in the beginning of the Plymouth Brethren movement.

== Life ==
Bellett was born in Dublin, Ireland. He was educated first at the grammar school in Exeter, England, then at Trinity College Dublin, where he excelled in classics, and afterwards in London.

It was in Dublin that, as a layman, he first became acquainted with John Nelson Darby, then a minister in the established Church of Ireland, and in 1829 the pair began meeting with others such as Edward Cronin and Francis Hutchinson for communion and prayer.

Bellett had become a Christian as a student and by 1827 was a layman serving the church. In a letter to James McAllister, written in 1858, he describes the episcopal charge of William Magee, Archbishop of Dublin, that sought for greater state protection for the Church. The Erastian nature of the charge offended Darby particularly, but also many others including Bellett.

The pair bonded particularly over prophetic issues, and attended meetings and discussions together at the home of Lady Powerscourt, and Bellett and Darby (along with the Brethren movement in particular) were particularly associated with dispensationalism and premillennialism.

== Writings ==
Bellett wrote many articles and books on scriptural subjects, his most famous works being The Patriarchs, The Evangelists and The Minor Prophets. A substantial list of his works can be found via STEM Publishing.

=== Selected works ===
- The Patriachs (Morrish, 1909)
- The Evangelists (Rouse, 1903)
- The Minor Prophets (ed. W. Kelly; Allan, 1870)
- Short Meditations (Cavenagh, 1866)
- Moral Glory of Jesus Christ
