= Edward Cronin (homeopath) =

Founder of the Plymouth Brethren

Edward Cronin (1 February 1801 – 1 February 1882) was a pioneer of homeopathy in England and one of the founders of the Plymouth Brethren movement.

== Life ==
Cronin was born in 1801 in Cork, Ireland, before moving to Dublin for health reasons in about 1826. In Dublin, he studied medicine at the Meath Hospital, and later utilised his medical ability on Anthony Norris Groves' pioneering mission to Baghdad, Ottoman Empire – after the death of his first wife in 1829, Cronin went with Groves to administer medical support including dealing with an outbreak of plague. While in Iran and later India, he also dealt with cholera and typhus using homeopathic principles.

Cronin returned to England in 1836, where, as a medical practitioner, he became an early adopter of homeopathy in the UK – Cronin is estimated to be the fifth such practitioner to introduce homeopathy. He was a member of the English Homeopathic Association, and in 1858 he became the last man to become a Lambeth MD before the Medical Act 1858 abolished this particular qualification. Cronin remarried and settled in Brixton where he lived until his death in 1882.

Cronin's eldest son Eugene Francis Cronin also took up homeopathic practice, and another of his sons, Augustus Cronin became an honorary dentist to the London Homeopathic Hospital.

== Faith ==
Originally a Roman Catholic, when Cronin moved to Dublin he sought membership with various dissenting churches in the area but was only admitted as a visitor. He began meeting with other Christians including Anthony Norris Groves, John Gifford Bellett and John Nelson Darby, whose conviction that the ordination of clergy was unnecessary and unscriptural, as well as his dispensationalist and premillennialist theology later became principal tenets of the Plymouth Brethren movement.

He remained faithful to this movement all his life, but one of his last actions was to precipitate a split in the already fractured movement. When a number of members of a failing assembly at Ryde had stopped attending the meeting, he travelled down and met with some of them and celebrated the Lord's Supper. A furious row erupted with different assemblies disagreeing about which side was right and therefore to be supported, with Darby, who had privately sympathised with him, attacking him in the strongest terms. The row escalated but was not resolved.
