= Faith mission =

Term

Faith mission is a term used most frequently among evangelical Christians to refer to a missionary organization with an approach to evangelism that encourages its missionaries to "trust in God to provide the necessary resources". These missionaries are said to "live by faith." Most faith missionaries are not financially supported by denominations.

== Faith missionaries ==
Early advocates of faith missions included many Plymouth Brethren missionaries such as:

- Hudson Taylor, missionary to China, and founder of the China Inland Mission, who advocated "Moving men, by God, through prayer alone" and not soliciting funds at all.
- Anthony Norris Groves, referred to as the "father of faith missions".
- Louisa Daniell, who ran a Mission Hall in Aldershot, the first of others across the UK
- George Müller, who ran orphanages in the Bristol area of England.

Other early leaders included:

- Arthur Tappan Pierson
- Methodist Episcopal Church missionary bishop, William Taylor

Modern examples include:

- Jim Elliot, martyred missionary to the Huaorani people of Ecuador
- The missionaries of The Faith Mission and of the Two by Twos sect
- Robert Pierce, founder of World Vision

== Faith mission organizations ==
- The Brethren (Jim Roberts group)
- Echoes of Service
- Mission Africa
- OMF International (formerly China Inland Mission)
- WEC International

== Criticisms ==
According to American professor David P. King, organizations adhering to this concept were more likely to hire missionaries without theological training.

In the 21st century, new graduates of American evangelical colleges or seminaries have questioned the concept of faith mission, due to the demands of mission organizations that refuse to hire those with a high level of student debt.

== See also ==
- Henry Grattan Guinness
- Indigenous church mission theory
