= The Brethren (Jim Roberts group) =

American itinerant Christian group

Brethren Body of Christ Brothers and Sisters
- Classification: Evangelical new religious movement
- Theology: Millenarianism; Apocalypticism
- Leader: Jerry Williams
- Founder: Jimmie T. "Jim" Roberts
- Origin: ~1971
- Separated from: Jesus movement

The Brethren is one of several informal names for a nameless, itinerant Christian new religious movement (NRM) founded by Jimmie T. "Jim" Roberts around 1971. The group is also referred to as The Travellers, The Road Ministry, Body of Christ, and the Brothers and Sisters. Emerging from the Jesus Movement, the group's members practice an extreme form of anti-materialism, shunning possessions and family ties to live as full-time wandering disciples.

The group's controversial practices—particularly its requirement for members to abandon family—have led anti-cult and Christian counter-cult organizations to classify it as a destructive cult. However, some scholars classify it as a fundamentalist, millenarian NRM.

== Origins ==
Jimmie T. Roberts (also known as Brother Evangelist Roberts), son of a former Pentecostal minister, created the movement around 1971, drawing together followers of the Jesus Movement across the United States. Roberts had become convinced that mainstream churches were too worldly and wished to create a wandering discipleship patterned on the New Testament apostles. He began recruiting a core of followers in Colorado and California. At first they adopted a communal lifestyle.

Jim Roberts died on December 6, 2015, in Denver, Colorado at the age of 76. His cause of death is listed as "metastatic adenocarcinoma of unclear primary." Upon Jim Roberts’ death, the leadership role of the organization was passed to Jerry Williams, who is commonly known as "Brother Hatsair," and three other elders.

== Beliefs ==
Beliefs are prominently millenarian and apocalyptic, centered on the teaching that humanity is in the end times and that members must purify themselves in preparation for the end of the world. The movement directs new members to sell their possessions and break ties with their families as a necessary part of discipleship. Any finances generated are distributed according to need. For instance, money might be used for material to sew clothing, traveling expenses, or cooking spices. In some cases new members' money was given to older members, but in other cases it was kept by the individual to do what they would with it.

The main Scriptures used in support of the group's anti-materialistic lifestyle are:

- Luke 14:33 "So likewise, whosoever he be of you that forsaketh not all that he hath, he cannot be my disciple."
- Matthew 19:29 "And every one that hath forsaken houses, or brethren, or sisters, or father, or mother, or wife, or children, or lands, for my names's sake, shall receive an hundredfold and shall inherit everlasting life."
- Acts 4:32 "And the multitude of them that believed were of one heart and one soul; neither said any of them that ought of the things which he possessed was his own; but they had all things common."
- Matthew 6:25 "Therefore I say unto you, Take no thought for your life, what ye shall eat, or what ye shall drink; nor yet for your body, what ye shall put on. Is not the life more than meat, and the body more than raiment?"
- Mark 8:35 "For whosoever will save his life shall lose it; but whosoever shall lose his life for my sake and the gospel's, the same shall save it."
- 2 Timothy 6:7-8 "For we brought nothing into this world, and it is certain we can carry nothing out. And having food and raiment let us be therewith content."

The Brethren live as itinerants. They acquired the nickname "the Garbage Eaters" after being observed collecting discarded food from dumpsters. Although some members may at times not bathe frequently, especially when camping out, the group has no laws or rules against bathing or using soap, shampoo, deodorant, etc. Although some members refuse medical treatment, other members have accepted medical treatment or dental work. During the 1970s, members wore monk-like habits. Men wear long beards and tunics, and women dress modestly in long dresses and long hair. Women and men eat separately and have clearly defined roles. Immediately on joining the group, women begin sewing their own clothing. Graven images are not allowed, and any image on products found are covered to protect the members from seeing them. Coloring is allowed, but not creating images. Singing is a part of nightly gatherings.

The Brethren also maintain that there is no actual sacrament of the Eucharist, and that the bread and wine should be understood only as a metaphor for fellowship. Members are divided into pairs (or occasionally three) and sent off to preach. The teams regather periodically for fellowship and to be assigned new companions and their next destination. The hierarchy is minimal. After the death of Roberts, four Elders were ordained as leaders. Some members are designated as "Older brothers" or "Middle brothers" according to time served in the group.

== Secrecy ==
A highly publicized case of deprogramming in Arkansas during 1975 brought unwelcome attention to the Brethren. Beginning in the late 1970s, stories written by members, such as Rachel Martin, also began appearing. Coverage, often negative, continued to surface in the media. The group dropped out of sight around 1980.

After several police raids and arrests in the 1970s, Roberts ordered members to keep their locations secret and not to communicate with their families. The members fear being arrested or kidnapped at the request of distraught families, with instances reported as recently as 1998.

Families of members have asserted that their relatives are moved about to keep them from reestablishing familial contact. Parents whose children have disappeared into the movement have formed a group called "The Roberts Group Parents Network" for mutual support and to aid in locating missing members. In 2011, Evangeline Griego's documentary film God Willing explored the experiences of parents trying to reestablish contact with children who had joined the Brethren and disappeared. The film has since aired on PBS stations in the United States.

== See also ==
- Faith mission
- Jesus Christians

== Bibliography ==
=== References ===
- Martin, Rachel; Bonnie Palmer Young (1980). Escape. London: Pickering and Inglis. ISBN 0-7208-0459-0.
- Melton, J. Gordon (2003). Encyclopedia of American Religions (Seventh ed.). Farmington Hills, Michigan: The Gale Group, Inc. ISBN 0-7876-6384-0.
- Snow, Robert L. (2003). Deadly Cults: The Crimes of True Believers. Westport Connecticut: Praeger Publishers. ISBN 978-0-275-98052-8.
- Walker, James K. (2007). The Concise Guide to Today's Religions and Spirituality. Eugene, Oregon: Harvest House Publishers. ISBN 978-0-7369-2011-7.
