= Anthony Norris Groves =

British missionary (1795–1853)

The Reverend Anthony Norris Groves
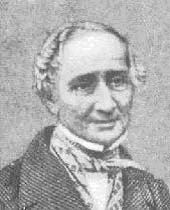
- Born: 1 February 1795; Newton Valence, Hampshire, England
- Died: 20 May 1853 (aged 58); Bristol, England
- Occupations: Dentist, missionary, author
- Spouse(s): Mary Bethia Thompson, Harriet Baynes

Anthony Norris Groves (1 February 1795 – 20 May 1853) was an English Protestant missionary, who has been called the "father of faith missions". He launched the first Protestant mission to Arabic-speaking Muslims, and settled in Baghdad, Ottoman Empire; and later in southern India. His ideas influenced a circle of friends who became leaders in the Plymouth Brethren. Among these were George Müller, who had married Groves's sister Mary, as well as John Nelson Darby and John Vesey Parnell, 2nd Baron Congleton.

Groves wished to simplify the task of churches and missions by returning to the methods of Christ and his apostles described in the New Testament. As a missionary, his goal was to help indigenous converts form their own churches without dependence on foreign training, authorisation or finance. His ideas eventually found wide acceptance in evangelical circles.

== Biography ==
Groves was born in Newton Valence, Hampshire, England and was the only son in a family of six. His father was a businessman and the family were Anglicans. Having trained as a dentist in London, he set up practice in Plymouth, at the age of 19. Two years later he married his cousin Mary Bethia Thompson, and moved to Exeter.

=== Call to missionary work ===
In 1826, while continuing his dentistry in Exeter, he enrolled as an external student of theology at Trinity College Dublin, with a view to ordination in the Church of England and appointment with the Church Missionary Society. His study of the New Testament led him to believe that the practices of the early church should be considered a model for every age and culture, and this caused him to consider withdrawing from Trinity College, from the CMS, and from the Anglican communion on his wife's advice. However, he had already laid the money aside and considered that he would be thought fickle if he suddenly abandoned his application. The morning before he was due to depart for Dublin, however, he was awoken by a noise and, on investigating, found that a burglary had taken place. Two packets of money were in his drawers - one containing £40 for the Irish trip and the other containing £16 for taxes: only the packet containing £40 was taken. Groves took this as a sign from God that he was not to go to Dublin and thereafter he gave up the idea.

He met with other Christian believers in private houses for study of the apostles' doctrine, for fellowship, breaking of bread, and prayer, as was the custom of the early church (Acts 2:42), without requiring the presence of any ordained minister. It was here that he met JN Darby and others who were later to become prominent leaders in the Plymouth Brethren movement. He became increasingly concerned with the drift of the Plymouth Brethren towards sectarianism under the leadership of Darby and aligned himself with George Müller when the brethren split in 1848 to form the Open Brethren and Exclusive Brethren.

=== Missionary to Baghdad ===
In 1829 Groves and his wife Mary set out for Baghdad, together with their two young sons, Henry and Frank, and accompanied by several Christian friends, one of whom was John Kitto. A second party set out to join them the following year, including Francis William Newman and John Vesey Parnell. In March 1831 Baghdad entered upon a year of intense misery, with civil war, plague, floods and famine, in which Groves suffered the death of his wife Mary on 14 May, and a recently born baby daughter on 24 August.

=== Missionary to India ===
At this time, a revised charter granted to the East India Company opened the way for unrestricted Christian missionary work in India. On invitation from Colonel Arthur Cotton, in 1833, Groves visited widely among missionaries in India, and found open doors for the gospel in many parts of the country. In 1834 he accompanied the Scottish missionary educator Alexander Duff from Calcutta to Scotland, nursing him slowly back to health. Duff probably owed his life to Groves's attentions, as indeed did Arthur Cotton on an earlier occasion.

During his time in Britain, Groves married for a second time to Harriet Baynes. The wedding took place on 25 April 1835 at St Mary's Church, Great Malvern. She accompanied Groves when he returned to India in 1836. Groves was accompanied by John Kitto, Edward Cronin and John V Parnel (2nd Baron Congleton). Rejoined by his sons and others from Baghdad, he established a missionary team in Madras supported largely through his dentistry, and later a farm and mission settlement in Chittoor. He recruited a number of missionaries to assist existing efforts in several parts of India, and to pioneer new ventures, notably in the Godavari Delta and Tamil Nadu.

Groves advocated the adoption of the New Testament as a manual of missionary methods. As a primitivist among missiologists, he pre-dated the more celebrated Roland Allen by eighty years. One of Groves's Indian disciples was John Arulappan who adopted his principles. As a full-time evangelist, Arulappan lived "by faith" and stimulated the creation of a network of indigenous Indian fellowships. Groves's ideas were later taken up in India by descendants of Arulappan associated with Bakht Singh, and, in a Chinese context, by Watchman Nee.

Groves continued preaching and teaching in India until ill health forced him back to England in 1852. His niece, Lydia Müller, wrote at the time 'Leaning his head on his hand, he sweetly fell asleep in Jesus, at twelve on Friday, 20 May 1853' in the home of his sister's husband George Müller. He is buried in Arnos Vale Cemetery in Bristol. He considered his life a failure, and did not live long enough to see the worldwide impact of his ideas and example on a new generation of "faith missions" springing from the 1859-60 Revivals.

== Influence ==
=== Author ===
In 1825, Groves wrote a small booklet Christian Devotedness, expounding Jesus' teaching concerning stewardship of material possessions. He exhorted all Christians to live economically, trusting God to supply their needs, and devoting their income to the cause of the Gospel. This booklet had a major impact upon George Müller, and through him on James Hudson Taylor (who soon after conversion attended the Kennington meeting where Edward Cronin was local) and many other significant Christian leaders.

Groves' early journals Journal of a Residence in Baghdad were edited by AJ Scott and published by J Nisbet, London in 1831 & 1832. After his death, his memoirs were published in 1856 by his widow Harriet Groves, under the title Memoir of the late AN Groves, containing Extracts from his Letters and Journals.

=== Letters ===
Throughout his life, Groves corresponded with several prominent leaders of the early Brethren movement. His letters are a notable primary source for historians of the Plymouth Brethren.

=== Sectarianism, Communion & Ordination ===
Groves, an Anglican, came to recognize fellowship of genuine Christians based on "Life, not light." On 10 March 1836, in a 'Prophetical' Letter to J.N. Darby, he wrote "I ever understood our principle of union to be the possession of the common life or common blood of the family of God (for the life is in the blood); these were our early thoughts, and are my most matured ones..." and "I would infinitely rather bear with all their evils, then separate from their good. These were the then principles of our separation and inter-communion." Thus he gathered with others of like mind for communion that ignored sectarian divisions, setting the stage for "Open communion" based on faith in Jesus alone, not denominational affiliation. And he later came to realize that ordination - official recognition of authority and privilege in ministry - was itself unbiblical. "One day, the thought was brought to my mind, that ordination of any kind to preach the gospel is no requirement of Scripture. To me it was the removal of a mountain." These principles had an effect on non-conformist churches then and non-denominational churches today.

=== Father of faith missions ===
The biography by RB Dann shows that Anthony Norris Groves may be rightly regarded as the "father of faith missions," i.e., the principle that a missionary, if called and sent by the Holy Spirit, should go to their mission in faith, believing that God will thus provide for all their needs - and without first raising funds from supporters. In addition, such a missionary should not publish their financial needs but rather wait in faith for God to provide. By his example, Groves challenged much of previous (and current) thinking about the missionary task through his journeys to Mesopotamia and India which he undertook without the backing of the State or Church. Instead, he put into practice what he believed to be the Biblical principle of trusting God alone to supply his needs.

== Publications ==
- Christian Devotedness (1829)
- Journal ... During a Journey from London to Bagdad (1831)
- Remarks on a Pamphlet, entitled: The Perpetuity of the Moral Law. (1840)
- Journal of a Residence at Bagdad: during the years 1830 and 1831 (1832)
- A Brief Account of the Present Circumstances of the Tinnevelly Mission (1835)
- The Present State of the Tinevelley Mission. Second Edition Enlarged, with an Historical Preface and Reply to Mr. Strachan's Criticisms; and Mr. Rhenius's (farewell) Letter to the Church Missionary Society (after Receiving His Dismissal) (1836)
- Memoir of Anthony Norris Groves
