= Samuel Prideaux Tregelles =

English biblical scholar

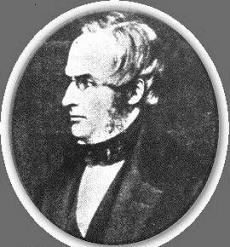
- Samuel Prideaux Tregelles
- Born: 30 January 1813; Falmouth, England
- Died: 24 April 1875 (aged 62); Plymouth, England
- Other name: S. P. Tregelles
- Occupation: Scholar

Samuel Prideaux Tregelles (30 January 1813 – 24 April 1875) was an English biblical scholar, lexicographer, Christian Hebraist, textual critic, and theologian.

== Life ==
Tregelles was born at Wodehouse Place, Falmouth, of Quaker parents, but he himself was for many years in communion with the Plymouth Brethren and then later in life became a Presbyterian (or perhaps an Anglican). He was the son of Samuel Tregelles (1789–1828) and his wife Dorothy (1790–1873) and was the nephew of Edwin Octavius Tregelles. He was educated at Falmouth classical school from 1825 to 1828.

For a time Tregelles worked at the ironworks, Neath Abbey, Glamorgan, where he devoted his spare time to learning Greek, Hebrew, Aramaic, and Welsh. His interest in Welsh developed from a desire to spread the Christian gospel and especially to combat the influence of atheism, Roman Catholicism, and Mormonism in Wales. Tregelles became a private tutor in Falmouth, and finally devoted himself to scholarship until he was incapacitated by paralysis in 1870.

In April 1839, Tregelles married Sarah Anna Prideaux (born 22 September 1807), a daughter of the Plymouth banker and Quaker Walter Prideaux, whose bank Hingston & Prideaux later became the Devon and Cornwall Bank. They had no children. Tregelles received an LL.D. degree from St. Andrews in 1850 and a pension of £200 from the civil list in 1862. He died at Plymouth.

== Works ==
Deciding that the Textus Receptus did not rest on ancient authority, Tregelles decided to publish a new version of the Greek text of the New Testament based on ancient manuscripts and the citations of the early Church Fathers, his work paralleling that of German philologist and textual critic, Karl Lachmann. Tregelles first became generally known through his Book of Revelation in Greek Edited from Ancient Authorities (1844), which contained the announcement of his intention to prepare the new Greek New Testament. In 1845 he went to Rome intending to collate the codex belonging to the Vatican. Although he was not allowed to copy the manuscript, he did note important readings. From Rome he went to Florence, Modena, Venice, Munich, and Basel, reading and collating manuscripts. He returned to England in November 1846, continuing to collate manuscripts in the British Museum. Tregelles also visited Paris, Hamburg, Berlin (where he met Lachmann), and Leipzig (where he collaborated with Constantin von Tischendorf), Dresden, Wolfenbüttel, and Utrecht.

Most of his numerous publications had reference to his great critical edition of the New Testament (1857–1872). They include an Account of the Printed Text of the Greek New Testament (1854), a new edition of T. H. Horne's Introduction (1860), and Canon Muratorianus: Earliest Catalogue of Books of the New Testament (1868). Tregelles was a member of the English revision committee overseeing the preparation of the Bible translation known as the Revised Version (or English Revised Version), of which the New Testament was published in 1881, six years after his death.

Tregelles also wrote Heads of Hebrew Grammar (1852), translated Gesenius's Hebrew and Chaldee Lexicon (1846, 1857) from Latin, and was the author of a little work on the Jansenists (1851) and of various works in exposition of his special eschatological views including Remarks on the Prophetic Visions of Daniel (1852, new ed., 1864) and The Hope of Christ's Second Coming (1864). Like his cousin by marriage, Benjamin Wills Newton, who was instrumental in Tregelles's conversion and who helped finance publication of his books, Tregelles was a post-tribulationist.

An acquaintance said of Tregelles that he was "able to shed a light upon any topic that might be introduced", but that to ask him a question was dangerous because "doing so was like reaching to take a book and having the whole shelf-full precipitated upon your head". Despite his erudition, Tregelles was also a warm-hearted evangelical who wrote many hymns, now largely forgotten, the earliest of which were published in the Plymouth Brethren's Hymns for the Poor of the Flock (1838).

== See also ==
- Constantin von Tischendorf
- Codex Zacynthius
- English Hexapla
