= Edwin Octavius Tregelles =

English ironmaster, civil engineer and Quaker minister (1806-1886)

- Born: 19 October 1806; Falmouth, Cornwall, England
- Died: 16 September 1886 (aged 79); Banbury, Oxfordshire, England
- Resting place: Sibford Gower
- Occupation: Ironmaster
- Spouses: Jenepher Fisher (m. 1832; died 1844) Elizabeth Richardson (m. 1850; died 1878)
- Children: 3
- Parents: Samuel Tregelles (1766 –1831) (father); Rebecca Smith (1766–1811) (mother)
- Relatives: Robert Fox (cousin)

Edwin Octavius Tregelles (19 October 1806 – 16 September 1886) was an English ironmaster, civil engineer and Quaker minister.

== Family life ==
He was the youngest of the seventeen children of Samuel Tregelles (1766 –1831) and his wife, Rebecca Smith (1766–1811) of Falmouth, Cornwall, United Kingdom. He married Jenepher Fisher (1808–1844), a Quaker from County Cork, on 3 July 1832. There were three children. On 4 December 1850, he remarried, to Elizabeth Richardson (1813–1878): there were no children.

== Business ==
Edwin Tregelles's father had formed an Iron Founding partnership with his Quaker relatives in Falmouth, the Foxes and in South Wales, the Prices. Edwin was apprenticed to Joseph Tregelles Price (1784–1854) the manager of the Welsh wing of the firm, at the Neath Abbey Iron Works. He learnt a great deal of practical business and engineering. He went into business as a civil engineer, superintended the introduction of gas lighting to towns in southern England. These included: Bridport, 1833; Dorchester, 1833; Bridgwater, 1843; Merthyr Tydvil, 1835; Exeter, 1836. In 1835 he was appointed engineer of the Southampton and Salisbury Railway, and later surveyed the West Cornwall Railway and in 1849 he reported on the water supply and sewerage of Barnstaple and Bideford. By 1850 he had become a tinplate manufacturer at Shotley Bridge, Co. Durham.

== Quaker and temperance activities ==
In 1853, he retired from business, in order to devote himself to religious and philanthropic work. He travelled in the Ministry to Ireland in 1839, with his cousin Robert Were Fox. He also travelled to the West Indies and Norway and many journeys in the Ministry in the United Kingdom.

He was on the Council of the United Kingdom Alliance, one of several Victorian bodies, promoting temperance.

He died in Banbury, Oxfordshire on 16 December 1886, and is buried in the Friends burial ground at Sibford Gower.
