= Plymouth Brethren =

Protestant Christian movement

The Plymouth Brethren or Assemblies of Brethren are an evangelical Christian movement, the history of which can be traced back to Plymouth, England and Dublin, Ireland in the mid to late 1820s.

The group emphasizes nuda scriptura, the belief that the Bible is the only authority for church doctrine and practice. The Plymouth Brethren teach the necessity of the new birth for salvation. The ordinance of baptism is observed by the Plymouth Brethren. They also emphasize the priesthood of all believers, rejecting any formal clergy and instead having elders or leading brothers. The Plymouth Brethren teach that "they are 'the assembly of God', not meeting together by human will, but 'gathered to Jesus by the Holy Ghost.' Hence they consider that they need no human ministry, but are under immediate Divine presidency, which is the fulfilment of the promise, 'Where two or three are gathered together in My Name there am I in the midst of them.' This they call the 'many-men ministry' in contradistinction to the 'one-man ministry' of" other Christian denominations. Plymouth Brethren have worship services centred on the Lord's Supper, which is celebrated every week on the Lord's Day. Plymouth Brethren ecclesiology is expounded in the text Gathering Unto His Name (1997), authored by Norman W. Crawford.

The Plymouth Brethren, being Nonconformists, separated from Anglicanism, with early Plymouth Brethren leaders including George Müller and John Nelson Darby. The movement is split into two main branches: the Open Brethren, who maintain more flexible engagement with wider society, and the Exclusive Brethren, who focus more on the separation from worldly influences. Plymouth Brethren generally see themselves as a network of like-minded free churches, not as a Christian denomination. Those belonging to the fellowship of various Plymouth Brethren congregations call one another "brother" and "sister". Plymouth Brethren worship in what is called a "Gospel Hall", a "Meeting Room" or less commonly, a "Bible Chapel".

== History ==
=== Origins in Ireland ===
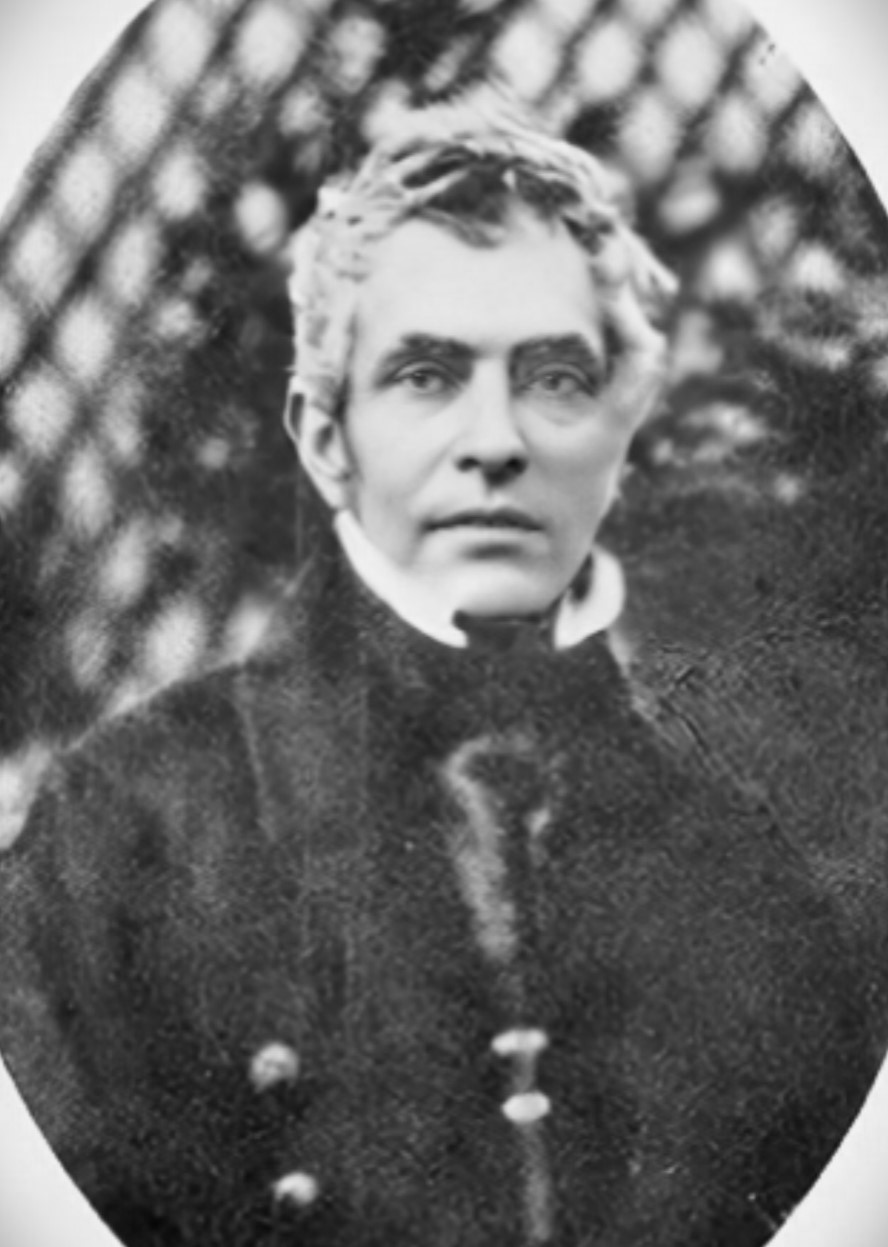
George Müller and John Nelson Darby, early leaders of the Plymouth Brethren

The Plymouth Brethren movement began in Dublin, Ireland, where several groups of Christians met informally to celebrate the Eucharist together, the first meeting being in 1825. The central figures were Anthony Norris Groves, a dentist studying theology at Trinity College; Edward Cronin, studying medicine, John Nelson Darby, an Anglican curate in County Wicklow; and John Gifford Bellett, a lawyer who brought them together. They did not have any liturgy, order of service, or even any ministers; in their view, since their guide was "the Bible alone" they sought to do it according to their own interpretation of the biblical text.

=== Early theology ===
An important early stimulus was the study of prophecy, which was the subject of a number of annual meetings at Powerscourt House in County Wicklow starting in 1831. Lady Powerscourt had attended Henry Drummond's prophecy conferences at Albury Park, and Darby was espousing the same pre-tribulational view in 1831 as Edward Irving. Many people came to these meetings who became important in the English movement, including Benjamin Wills Newton and George Müller.

The two main but conflicting aspirations of the movement were to create a holy and pure fellowship on the one hand, and to allow all Christians into fellowship on the other. Believers in the movement felt that the established Church of England had abandoned or distorted many of the ancient traditions of Christendom, following decades of dissent and the expansion of Methodism and political revolutions in the United States and France. People in the movement wanted simply to meet together in the name of the Lord Jesus Christ without reference to denominational differences.

=== Establishment in Great Britain ===
The first meeting in Great Britain was held in December 1831 in Plymouth, England. It was organised primarily by George Wigram, Benjamin Wills Newton, and John Nelson Darby. The movement soon spread throughout the United Kingdom, and the assembly in Plymouth had more than 1,000 people in fellowship in 1845.

They became known as "the brethren from Plymouth" and were soon simply called "Plymouth Brethren". The term Darbyites is also used, especially when describing the Exclusive branch which has a more pronounced influence from Darby. Many within the movement refuse to accept any name other than "Christian".

=== Schism ===
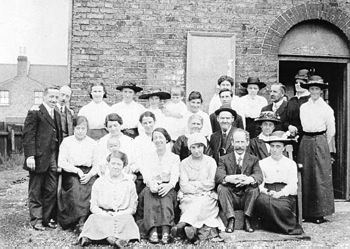
A Plymouth Brethren meeting hall and congregation

In 1845, Darby returned from an extended visit to Switzerland where he had achieved considerable success establishing churches. He returned to Plymouth where Newton was in control, and he disagreed with some details in a book that Newton had published concerning the tribulation that was coming. He also objected to Newton's place as an elder in the Plymouth meeting. But several attempts to settle the quarrel in the presence of other brethren failed to produce any clear result. Two years later, Darby attacked Newton over a lecture that Newton had given on the 6th Psalm, and an exchange of tracts followed. Newton retracted some of his statements, but he eventually left Plymouth and established another chapel in London.

Darby had instituted a second meeting at Plymouth, and in 1848 he complained of the Bristol Bethesda assembly, in which George Müller was prominent; he was concerned because they had accepted a member from Ebrington Street, Newton's original chapel. Bethesda investigated the individual but defended their decision, and Darby was not satisfied. He issued a circular on 26 August 1848, cutting off Bethesda and all assemblies who received anyone who went there. This defined the essential characteristic of "exclusivism" which he pursued for the rest of his life.

=== Two movements: Exclusive Brethren and Open Brethren ===
From 1848, the Brethren continued as two separate main movements: the Exclusive Brethren led by Darby, and the Open Brethren led by Müller and others. Darby visited Exclusive assemblies in America seven times between 1862 and 1877. Itinerant preachers from Scotland and Ireland established most of the early Open Brethren assemblies in America in the second half of the 19th century.

The Exclusive Brethren experienced many subsequent splits, scatterings, and recombinations. The Open Brethren also suffered a split concerning the autonomy of assemblies, which occurred at different times in different parts of the world. Nevertheless, both continued to expand their congregations. In the United States between 1916 and 1919, Exclusive Brethren membership increased 33% to 3,896, while Open Brethren membership increased 25% to 5,928. The census also recorded three smaller movements with sizeable congregations.

== Branches and distinctions ==
Both Open and Exclusive Brethren have historically been known as "Plymouth Brethren". That is still largely the case in some areas, such as North America. In some other parts of the world such as Australia and New Zealand, most Open Brethren shun the "Plymouth" label. This is mostly because of widespread negative media coverage of the Plymouth Brethren Christian Church, the most hardline branch of the Exclusive Brethren (and the only numerically significant Exclusive group in either country), which most Open Brethren consider to be a cult with which they do not wish to be misidentified.

Terminology which sometimes confuses Brethren and non-Brethren alike is the distinction between the Open assemblies, usually called "Chapels", and the Closed assemblies (non-Exclusive), called "Gospel Halls". Contrary to common misconceptions, those traditionally known as the "Closed Brethren" are not a part of the Exclusive Brethren, but are rather a very conservative subset of the Open Brethren. The Gospel Halls regard reception to the assembly as a serious matter. One is not received to the Lord's Supper but to the fellowship of the assembly. This is important because the Lord's Supper is for believers, not unbelievers.

Some chapels, on the other hand, will allow practically anyone to participate who walks in and says that they are a Christian, based on the newcomer's profession of faith. Such assemblies are said to have an "open table" approach to strangers. Gospel Hall Brethren, on the other hand, generally believe that only those formally recognised as part of that or an equivalent assembly should break bread. Most Closed and some Open Brethren hold that association with evil defiles and that sharing the Communion meal can bring that association.

Their support text is from 1 Corinthians 15:33, "Do not be deceived: evil communications corrupt good manners." Among other distinctions, the Gospel Halls would generally not use musical instruments in their services, whereas many Chapels use them and may have singing groups, choirs, "worship teams" of musicians, etc. The Gospel Halls tend to be more conservative in dress; women do not wear trousers often, although they can and there is no scriptural objection in doing so, but most do not wear them in meetings and always have their heads covered, while in most Chapels Brethren women may wear whatever they wish, though modesty in dress serves as a guideline, and many continue the tradition of wearing a head covering taught in 1 Corinthians 11:2–13. Open Brethren churches are all independent, self-governing, local congregations with no central headquarters, although there are a number of seminaries, missions agencies, and publications that are widely supported by Brethren churches and which help to maintain a high degree of communication among them.

Henry K. Carroll performed an analysis of United States census data in 1912 to assign Roman numerals to various Brethren groups. For example, Brethren III is also known as the Lowe Brethren and the Elberfeld Brethren. Carroll's initial findings listed four sub-groups, identified as Brethren I-IV, but he expanded the number to six and then to eight; Arthur Carl Piepkorn expanded the number to ten. Those who have attempted to trace the realignments of the Plymouth Brethren include Ian McDowell and Massimo Introvigne. The complexity of the Brethren's history is evident in charts by McDowell and Ian McKay.

=== Open Brethren ===
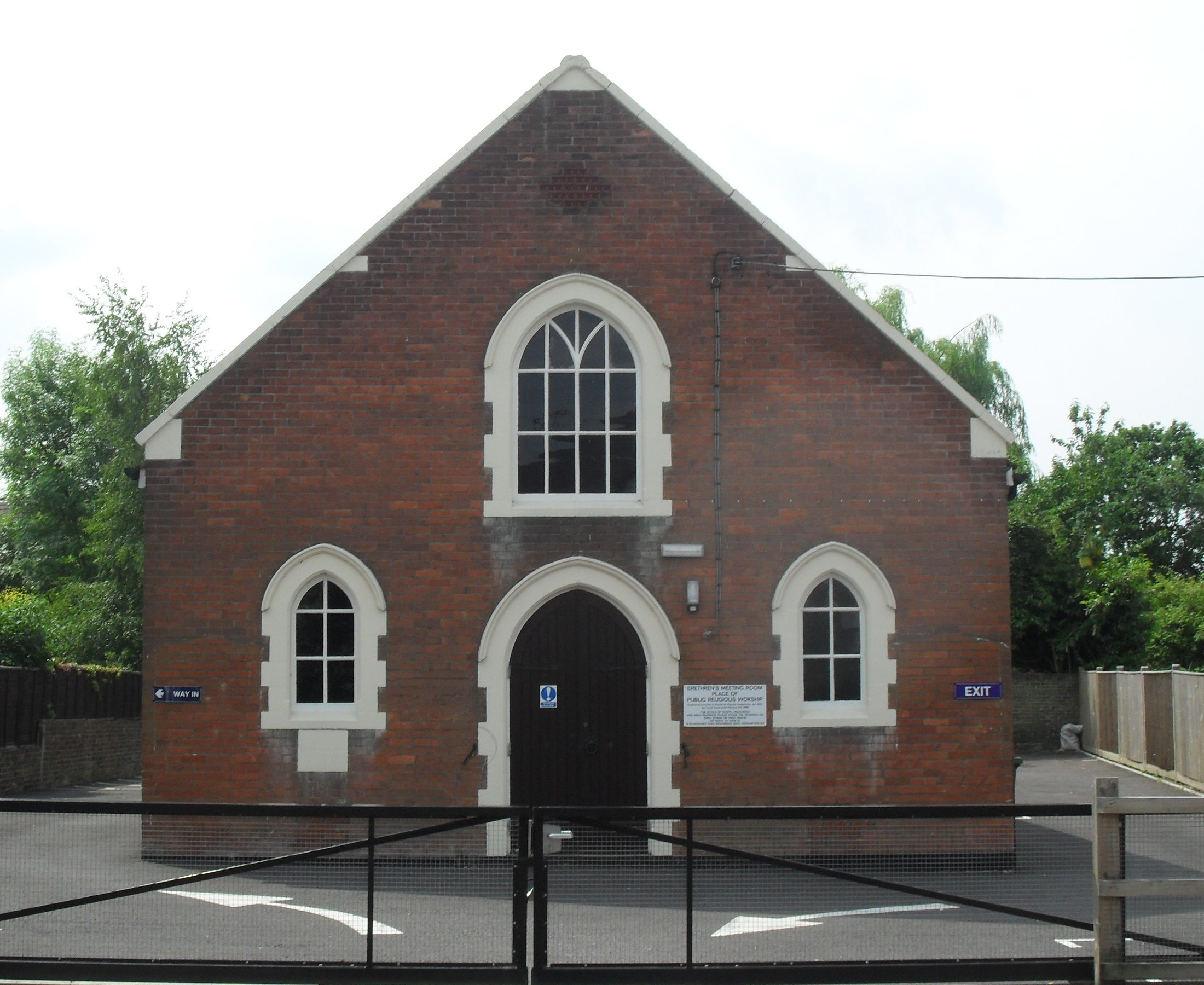
A Plymouth Brethren chapel in Broadbridge Heath, West Sussex, England

The best-known and oldest distinction between Open assemblies is in the nature of relationships among their local churches. Open Brethren assemblies function as networks of like-minded independent local churches. Brethren generally feel an obligation to recognize and adhere to the disciplinary actions of other associated assemblies. Conversely, Open assemblies aware of that disciplining would not automatically feel a binding obligation to support it, treating each case on its own merit. Reasons for being put under discipline by both the Open and Exclusive Brethren include disseminating gross Scriptural or doctrinal error or being involved in unscriptural behavior. Being accused of illegal financial dealings may also result in being put under discipline.

Another less clear difference between assemblies lies in their approaches to collaborating with other Christians. Many Open Brethren will hold gospel meetings, youth events, or other activities in partnership with non-Brethren Evangelical Christian churches. More conservative Brethren tend to not support activities outside their own meetings.

==== IBCM ====
International Brethren Conferences on Mission (IBCM) were founded in 1993 in Singapore by unions of churches from various countries. According to an IBCM Network census released in 2020, they claimed 40,000 churches and 2,700,000 members in 155 countries.

=== Exclusive Brethren ===
Exclusive Brethren have remained attached to Darby's doctrine. They are more interdependent, more conservative with a propensity for a dress code, very attached to the spontaneity of worship and preaching. They form several more or less compartmentalized circles of communion, from the most moderate to the narrowest. The movement has a Protestant theology and recognizes infant baptism. Around 40,000 worldwide in 2012, "close" brothers are often referred to as Darbyists, but rarely refer to themselves as such.

==== Plymouth Brethren Christian Church ====
There are a number of Exclusive Brethren fellowships (such as the Lowe Brethren, Glanton Brethren, and Alte Elberfelder Brethren) though the secular media often uses the term 'Exclusive Brethren' to describe one separatist group known as Taylor-Hales Brethren, who now call themselves the Plymouth Brethren Christian Church (PBCC), which claims 50,000 members worldwide in 2023, known for a particularly isolationist interpretation of separation from evil and definition of what constitutes fellowship. In their view, fellowship includes dining out, business and professional partnerships, membership of clubs, etc., rather than just the act of Communion (Lord's Supper), so these activities are done only with other members. There are several unquantified but sizable branches unaffiliated with the Raven-Taylor-Hales group (since initial divisions in the 1880s, and more recent secessions in the 1960s–1970s) that prefer being referred to as Closed or Careful rather than Exclusive Brethren to avoid any connection with the more strident group.

== Leadership ==
One of the most defining elements of the Brethren is the rejection of the concept of clergy. Their view is that all Christians are ordained by God to serve and therefore all are ministers, in keeping with the doctrine of the priesthood of all believers. The Brethren embrace the most extensive form of that idea, in that there is no ordained or unordained person or group employed to function as minister(s) or pastors. Brethren assemblies are led by the local church elders within any fellowship.

Historically, there is no office of pastor in most Brethren churches, because they believe that the term pastor (ποιμήν, poimen in Greek) as it is used in Ephesians 4:11 describes one of the gifts given to the church, rather than a specific office. In the words of Darby, these gifts in Ephesians 4:11 are "ministrations for gathering together and for edification established by Christ as Head of the body by means of gifts with which He endows persons as His choice." Therefore, there is no formal ordination process for those who preach, teach, or lead within their meetings. Men who become elders, or those who become deacons and overseers within the fellowship, have been recognized by others within the individual assemblies and have been given the blessing of performing leadership tasks by the elders.

An elder should be able and ready to teach when his assembly sees the "call of God" on his life to assume the office of elder (1 Timothy 3:2). Brethren elders conduct many other duties that would typically be performed by the clergy in other Christian groups, including counselling those who have decided to be baptized, performing baptisms, visiting the sick, and giving spiritual counsel in general. Normally, sermons are given either by the elders or by men who regularly attend the Sunday meetings—but, again, only men whom the elders recognize as having the "call of God" on their lives for that particular ministry. Visiting speakers, however, are usually paid their travel costs and provided for with Sunday meals following the meetings.

Open and Exclusive Brethren differ in how they interpret the concept of no clergy. The Open Brethren believe in a plurality of elders (Acts 14:23; 15:6,23; 20:17; Philippians 1:1), men meeting the Biblical qualifications found in 1 Timothy 3:1–7 and Titus 1:6–9. This position is also taken in some Baptist churches, especially Reformed Baptists, and by the Churches of Christ. It is understood that elders are appointed by the Holy Spirit (Acts 20:28) and are recognised as meeting the qualifications by the assembly and by previously existing elders. Generally, the elders themselves will look out for men who meet the biblical qualifications, and invite them to join them as elders. In some Open assemblies, elders are elected democratically, but this is a fairly recent development and is still relatively uncommon.

Officially naming and recognizing eldership is common to Open Brethren (cf. 1 Thessalonians 5:12–13), whereas many Exclusive Brethren assemblies believe that recognizing a man as an elder is too close to having clergy, and therefore a group of leading brothers, none of whom has an official title of any kind, attempts to present issues to the entire group for it to decide upon, believing that the whole group must decide, not merely a body of elders. Traditionally, only men are allowed to speak (and, in some cases, attend) these decision-making meetings, although not all assemblies follow that rule today.

The term elder is based on the same Scriptures that are used to identify bishops and overseers in other Christian circles, and some Exclusive Brethren claim that the system of recognition of elders by the assembly means that the Open Brethren cannot claim full adherence to the doctrine of the priesthood of all believers. Open Brethren consider, however, that this reveals a mistaken understanding of the priesthood of all believers which, in the Assemblies, has to do with the ability to directly offer worship to God and His Christ at the Lord's Supper, whether silently or audibly, without any human mediator being necessary—which is in accordance with 1 Timothy 2:5, where it is stated that Christ Jesus Himself is the sole Mediator between God and men (men being used here generically of humanity, and not referring simply and solely to males).

The Plymouth Brethren Christian Church, the most hardline of all the Exclusive Brethren groups, has a senior leader, currently Bruce Hales of Australia.

In place of an ordained ministry, an itinerant preacher often receives a "commendation" to the work of preaching and teaching that demonstrates the blessing and support of the assembly of origin. In most English-speaking countries, such preachers have traditionally been called full-time workers, labouring brothers, or on the Lord's work; in India, they are usually called Evangelists and very often are identified with Evg. in front of their name.

A given assembly may have any number of full-time workers, or none at all. In the last twenty years, many Open Assemblies in Australia, America, and New Zealand, and some elsewhere, have begun calling their full-time workers pastors, but this is not seen as ordaining clergy and does not connote a transfer of any special spiritual authority. In such assemblies, the pastor is simply one of several elders, and differs from his fellow-elders only in being salaried to serve full-time. Depending on the assembly, he may or may not take a larger share of the responsibility for preaching than his fellow elders.

== Missionary work ==
The Plymouth Brethren have been active in foreign missionary work, principally in Central Africa, India and Latin America. Brethren are found throughout the English-speaking world and in most European countries. The movement spread to the US in the 1860s.

== Notable Brethren ==
This list consists of mostly nineteenth-century figures who were associated with the Brethren movement before the 1848 schism. They are the leading historical figures common to both the Open and Exclusive Brethren. Two exceptions are H.A. Ironside and Watchman Nee, twentieth-century preachers who spent time associated with both the Open and Exclusive Brethren. See the respective articles for other more recent figures who have functioned primarily or entirely in either the Open Brethren or Exclusive Brethren:

- Robert Anderson – senior officer of Scotland Yard and Christian author; was a member of the Plymouth Brethren, first with Darby then with the Open Brethren party, before returning to his Presbyterian roots
- John Gifford Bellet – research fellow in classics at Trinity College, Cambridge.
- André Bergeron – French trade union leader
- George Beurling – Canadian WWII fighter pilot
- Robert Mackenzie Beverley – one of the most influential figures to abandon the Quakers and join the Brethren during the Beaconite controversy
- John Bodkin Adams – British general practitioner, convicted fraudster, and suspected serial killer.
- Lancelot Brenton – translator of the Greek-English edition of the Septuagint
- F. F. Bruce – British biblical scholar, author of 40 books and commentaries. (Open Brethren)
- Robert Chapman – prominent among the Plymouth Brethren in the 19th century
- William Coltman - Victoria Cross recipient, Open Brethren Sunday School teacher. Most decorated stretcher bearer of World War I.
- Henry Craik – worked with George Müller in Bristol at Gideon and Bethesda Chapels from 1832
- Edward Cronin – pioneer of homeopathy and one of the original Dublin brethren
- Anthony Crosland – British Labour Party MP and Foreign Secretary from 1976 to 1977; grandson of F. E. Raven (Raven Exclusive Brethren).
- John Nelson Darby – international preacher, writer, translator, hymn writer, and "father of dispensationalism"
- James George Deck – evangelist and missionary to New Zealand; officially associated with the Exclusives but refused to cut his ties to the Open Brethren.
- Jim Elliot – one of five missionaries killed while participating in Operation Auca
- Ken Follett – British novelist
- Emily Bowes Gosse – painter, illustrator, and author of religious tracts
- Philip Henry Gosse – naturalist and marine biologist
  - Edmund Gosse – the son of Phillip and Emily Gosse who wrote Father and Son, about his relationship with his father and the religion.
- Flamy Grant – 21st century drag queen and Christian singer; grew up in a Plymouth Brethren household but has not specified which group.
- Anthony Norris Groves – missionary to Baghdad and India
- Stuart Wesley Keene Hine – missionary and hymn-writer, translator and author of How Great Thou Art
- John Eliot Howard – chemist and quinologist
- Luke Howard – chemist and meteorologist, the "namer of clouds"
- Garth Hudson – musician and member of The Band
- Harry Ironside – Bible teacher, preacher, and author; pastor of the Moody Church in Chicago (1930–1948); associated at different times with both the Open and Exclusive Brethren
- Garrison Keillor - author and radio personality, left PB assemblies of his childhood
- William Kelly – prominent leader of the Exclusive Brethren in the late 19th century
- Charles Henry Mackintosh – 19th-century author of Christian books who published as C.H.M.
- Virginia Ramey Mollenkott – theologian and evangelical feminist author
- George Müller – founder of the Bristol Orphanage and a stated teacher in Bethesda Chapel, Bristol
- Watchman Nee – leader in the "Little Flock" movement in China after being "put out" by Exclusive Brethren for "breaking bread with sectarians"
- Thomas Newberry – translator of the Newberry Reference Bible, which uses a system of symbols to explain verb tenses
- Francis William Newman – younger brother of Cardinal John Henry Newman; excommunicated for denying the Divinity of Christ
- Benjamin Wills Newton – early leader of the assembly in Plymouth; branded as a heretic by John Darby and his followers
- John Parnell, 2nd Baron Congleton – missionary to Mesopotamia
- G. H. Pember – English theologian who lived in the 19th century; wrote the book Earth's Earliest Ages
- Joseph M. Scriven – writer of the words to the hymn "What A Friend We Have In Jesus"
- Samuel Prideaux Tregelles – English biblical scholar and theologian
- William Edwy Vine – author of Vine's Expository Dictionary of Old and New Testament Words and numerous commentaries
- George Wigram – wrote a Greek and English Concordance to the New Testament and The Englishman's Hebrew and Chaldee Concordance of the Old Testament
- Orde Wingate – British commando

== See also ==
- Assemblies Jehovah Shammah
- Exclusive Brethren
- Gospel Hall Brethren or Gospel Hall Assemblies
- Indian Brethren
- Kerala Brethren Assembly
- The Local Church (affiliation)
- Needed Truth Brethren
- Open Brethren
- Plymouth Brethren Christian Church

== Bibliography ==
- Adams, Norman (1972). Goodbye, Beloved Brethren. Impulse Publications Inc. ISBN 0-901311-13-8.
- Carroll, Henry K. (1912). Religious Forces of the United States. New York: C. Scribner's Sons. pp. xxii, 59–65. Reprint: ISBN 9780790543314.
- Carroll, H. K. (1912). Religious Forces in the United States. New York
- Coad, F. Roy (2001). A History of the Brethren Movement: Its Origins, Its Worldwide Development and Its Significance for the Present Day. Regent College Publishing ISBN 1-57383-183-2
- Dorman, W. H. (1866). The Close of Twenty-eight Years of Association with J. N. Darby. London: Houlston & Wright. OCLC 42193000
- Embley, Peter L. (1966). The Origins and Early Development of the Plymouth Brethren (PDF). Archived from the original (PDF) on 8 December 2003. Ph.D. Thesis
- Grass, Tim (2006). Gathering to his Name: The Story of the Open Brethren in Britain and Ireland. Bletchley, UK: Paternoster. ISBN 9781842272206.
- Groves, Henry (1866). Darbyism: Its Rise and Development and a Review of the "Bethesda Question" . London: Houlston & Wright.
- Groves, Harriet (1869). Memoir of Anthony Norris Groves (3rd ed.). London: James Nisbet & Co.
- Introvigne, Massimo (2018). The Plymouth Brethren. New York: Oxford University Press. ISBN 9780190842420.
- Ironside, H. A. (1985) Historical Sketch of the Brethren Movement Loizeaux Brothers ISBN 0-87213-344-3, 1st edition 1942.
- Kelly, William (1883). Response by William Kelly to J. S. Teulon's Plymouth Brethren Free download site
- Lindsay, Thomas Martin (1885). "Plymouth Brethren", Encyclopædia Britannica, Ninth Edition. New York: Charles Scribner's Sons.
- Lindsay, Thomas Martin & Grieve, Alexander James (1911). "Plymouth Brethren", Encyclopædia Britannica, Eleventh Edition. New York: Encyclopædia Britannica, Inc.
- Neatby, William B. (1901). A history of the Plymouth Brethren . London: Hodder & Stoughton.
- Noel, Napoleon (1936). History of the Brethren. W F Knapp, Colorado. OCLC 1099747362.
- Pickering, Henry (1918). Chief Men Among the Brethren. London: Pickering & Inglis, 1918; Loizeaux Brothers, Inc. Neptune, NJ, 1996, ISBN 0-87213-798-8.
- Shuff, Roger N. (2006). Searching for the True Church: Brethren and Evangelicals in Mid-Twentieth-Century England. Eugene, OR: Wipf & Stock. ISBN 9781842272541.
- Smith, Natan Dylan (1996). Roots, Renewal and the Brethren. Hope Publishing House ISBN 0-932727-08-5
- Strauch, Alexander (1995). Biblical Eldership: An Urgent Call to Restore Biblical Church Leadership. Lewis & Roth Publishers ISBN 0-936083-11-5
- Stott, Rebecca (2017). In the Days of Rain: A Daughter, A Father, A Cult. Winner of the 2017 Costa Biography Prize. London: Fourth Estate. ISBN 0-008-20919-7
- Stunt, Timothy C. F. (2000). From Awakening to Secession: radical evangelicals in Switzerland and Britain, 1815–35. Edinburgh: T. & T. Clark ISBN 0-567-08719-0
- Taylor (1866). Biography of Henry Craik. London.
- Teulon, J. S. (1883). The History and Teaching of The Plymouth Brethren. London Free download site ISBN 9-780-52408-534-9
