= John Nelson Darby =

British theologian (1800–1882)

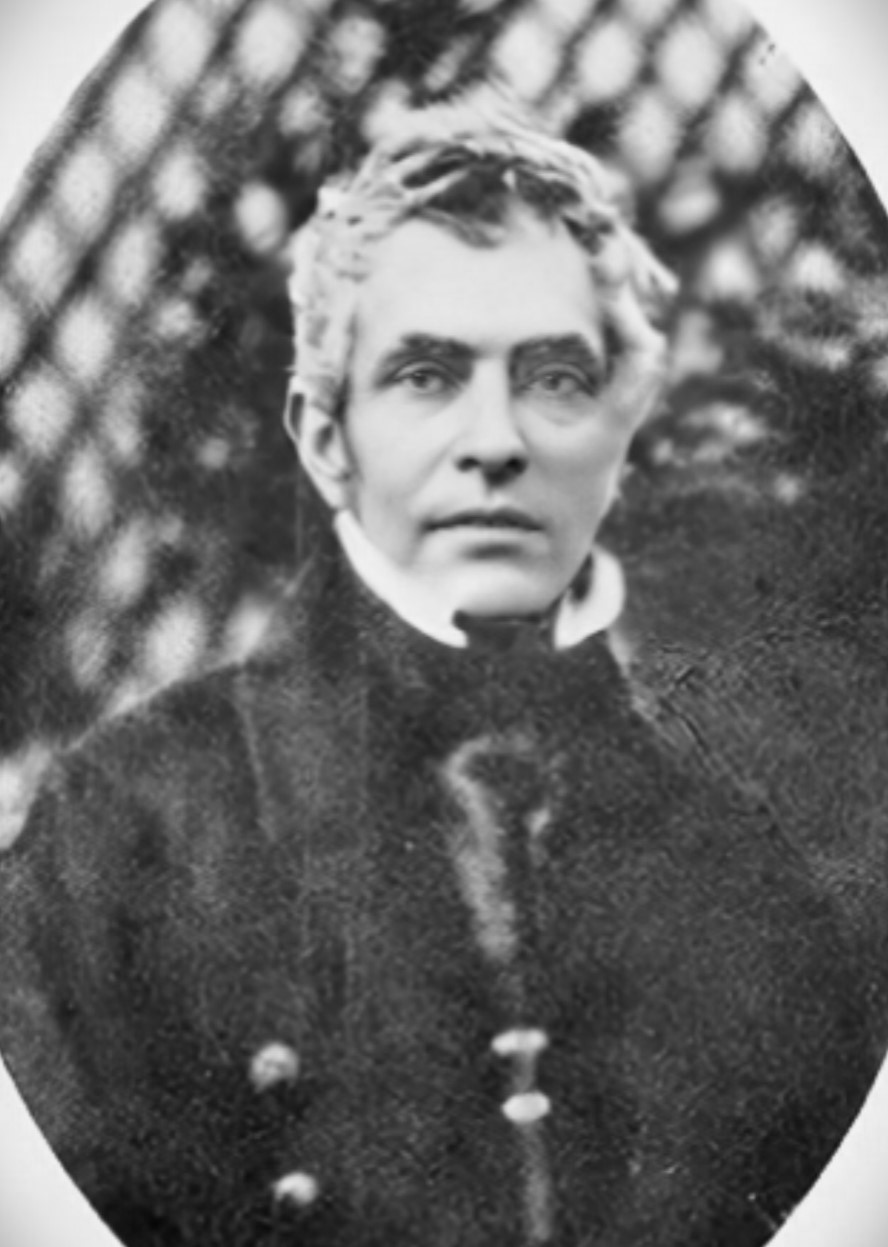
- Darby in 1840

Personal life
- Born: 18 November 1800 Westminster, Middlesex, England
- Died: 29 April 1882 (aged 81) Sundridge House, Bournemouth, England
- Occupation: Writer, translator, educator, clergyman

Religious life
- Religion: Christianity
- Denomination: Exclusive Brethren

John Nelson Darby (18 November 1800 – 29 April 1882) was a Bible teacher, one of the influential figures among the original Plymouth Brethren and the founder of the Exclusive Brethren. He is considered to be the father of modern dispensationalism and futurism. Pre-tribulation rapture theology was popularized extensively in the 1830s by Darby and the Plymouth Brethren, and further popularized in the United States in the early 20th century by the wide circulation of the Scofield Reference Bible.

He produced translations of the Bible in German, the "Elberfelder Bibel", in French, the "Pau" Bible, the Dutch New Testament, and the famous and influential English translation (finished posthumously) based on the Hebrew and Greek texts called The Holy Scriptures: A New Translation from the Original Languages by J. N. Darby. It has furthermore been translated into other languages in whole or part.

== Early years ==
John Nelson Darby was born in Westminster, London, and christened at St Margaret's on 3 March 1801. He was the youngest of the six sons of John Darby and Anne Vaughan. The Darbys were an Anglo-Irish landowning family seated at Leap Castle, King's County, Ireland, (present-day County Offaly). He was a nephew of Admiral Henry D'Esterre Darby who served with Lord Nelson at the Battle of the Nile, and it was in recognition of this family connection that John was given his middle name.

Darby was educated at Westminster School and Trinity College Dublin where he graduated Classical Gold Medallist in 1819. Darby embraced Christianity during his studies, although there is no evidence that he formally studied theology. He joined an inn of court, but felt that being a lawyer was inconsistent with his religious belief. The future Bishop of Meath and evangelical Joseph Singer tutored him at Trinity. He, therefore, chose ordination as an Anglican clergyman in Ireland, "lest he should sell his talents to defeat justice". In 1825, Darby was ordained deacon of the established Church of Ireland and the following year as priest.

== Middle years ==
Darby became a curate in the Church of Ireland parish of Delgany, County Wicklow, and distinguished himself by persuading Roman Catholic peasants in the Calary district within this parish to abandon the Catholic Church. The gospel tract "How the Lost Sheep was Saved" gives his personal account of a visit he paid to a dying shepherd boy in this area, painting a vivid picture of what his work among the poor people involved. He later claimed to have won hundreds of converts to the Church of Ireland. However, the conversions ended when William Magee, the Anglican Archbishop of Dublin, ruled that converts were obliged to swear allegiance to George IV as the rightful king of Ireland.

Darby resigned his curacy in protest. Soon afterwards, in October 1827, he fell from a horse and was seriously injured. He later stated that it was during this time that he began to believe that the "kingdom" described in the Book of Isaiah and elsewhere in the Old Testament was entirely different from the Christian church.

Over the next five years, he developed the principles of his mature theology – most notably his conviction that the very notion of a clergyman was a sin against the Holy Spirit, because it limited the recognition that the Holy Spirit could speak through any member of the Church. During this time (1827–28) he joined an interdenominational meeting of believers (including Anthony Norris Groves, Edward Cronin, J. G. Bellett, and Francis Hutchinson) who met to "break bread" together in Dublin as a symbol of their unity in Christ. By 1832, this group had grown and began to identify themselves as a distinct Christian assembly. As they travelled and began new assemblies in Ireland and England, they formed the movement now known as the Plymouth Brethren.

It is believed that John Nelson Darby left the Church of Ireland around 1831. (Note: The year in which Darby left the Church of Ireland, a branch of the Anglican Church, is not certain but a consensus of opinion is that it was possibly around 1831. Searches for formal documentation of his resignation have been made in the Church of Ireland archives, but nothing has been found.) He participated in the 1831–1833 Powerscourt Conference, an annual meeting of Bible students organized by his friend, (Note: It is widely believed that Darby and Lady Powerscourt were romantically attached but friends persuaded him that any marriage may prove a distraction.) the wealthy widow Lady Powerscourt. At the conference, Darby publicly described his ecclesiological and eschatological views, including the pre-tribulation rapture. For about 40 years William Kelly (1821–1906) was his chief interpreter and continued to be a staunch supporter until his own death. Kelly in his work John Nelson Darby as I Knew Him stated that "a saint more true to Christ's name and word I never knew or heard of".

Darby defended Calvinist doctrines when they came under attack from within the Church in which he once served. His biographer Goddard states, "Darby indicates his approval of the doctrine of the Anglican Church as expressed in Article XVII of the Thirty-nine Articles" on the subject of election and predestination. Darby said:

For my own part, I soberly think Article XVII to be as wise, perhaps I might say the wisest and best condensed human statement of the view it contains that I am acquainted with. I am fully content to take it in its literal and grammatical sense. I believe that predestination to life is the eternal purpose of God, by which, before the foundations of the world were laid, He firmly decreed, by His counsel secret to us, to deliver from curse and destruction those whom He had chosen in Christ out of the human race, and to bring them, through Christ, as vessels made to honour, to eternal salvation.

== Later years ==
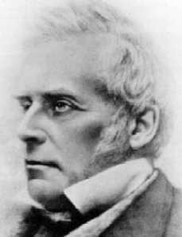
John Nelson Darby around 1870

Darby travelled widely in Europe and Britain in the 1830s and 1840s, and established many Brethren assemblies. He gave 11 significant lectures in Geneva in 1840 on the hope of the church (L'attente actuelle de l'église). These established his reputation as a leading interpreter of biblical prophecy. America did not embrace Darby's ecclesiology as it did his eschatology, which is still being propagated (in various forms) at such places as Dallas Theological Seminary, and by authors and preachers such as Hal Lindsey and John Hagee.

In 1848, Darby became involved in a complex dispute over the proper method for maintaining shared standards of discipline in different assemblies that resulted in a split between Open Brethren, which maintained a congregational form of government and Exclusive Brethren. After that time, he was recognized as the dominant figure among the Exclusives, who also came to be known as "Darbyite" Brethren. He made at least 5 missionary journeys to North America between 1862 and 1877. He worked mostly in New England, Ontario, and the Great Lakes region, but took one extended journey from Toronto to Sydney by way of San Francisco, Hawaii, and New Zealand. A Geographical Index of his letters is currently available and lists where he travelled. He used his classical skills to translate the Bible from Hebrew and Greek texts into several languages. In English, he wrote a Synopsis of the Bible and many other scholarly religious articles. He wrote hymns and poems, the most famous being, "The Man of Sorrows", (not to be confused with "Man of Sorrows, What a Name" by Philip Bliss (1838–1876)). He was also a Bible commentator. His writings were collected in his lifetime and published from January 1866 as "The Collected Writings of J. N. Darby"; there were 32 volumes published – two per year 1866–1881 and two more soon after. He translated the Bible with the help of various brethren in different countries into German, French and English. He declined, however, to contribute to the compilation of the Revised Version of the King James Bible even though the revisers consulted Darby's work.

He died in 1882 at Sundridge House, Bournemouth and is buried in Bournemouth, Dorset, England.

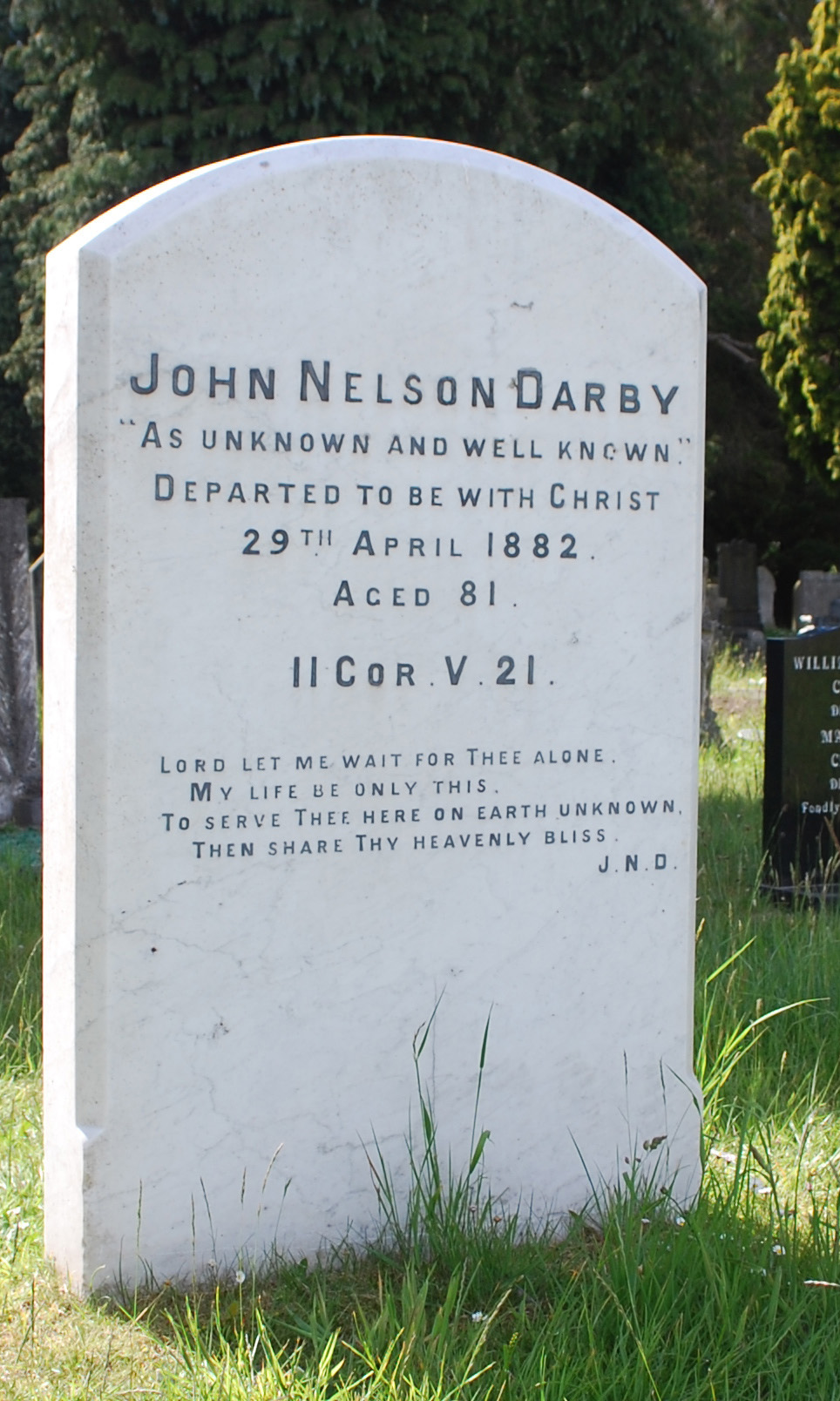
Gravestone of John Nelson Darby in Wimborne Road Cemetery, in Bournemouth, England

Darby is noted in the theological world as the father of "dispensationalism", whose eschatology was adopted and later made popular in the United States by Cyrus Scofield's Scofield Reference Bible.

Charles Henry Mackintosh (1820–1896) with his popular style spread Darby's teachings to humbler elements in society and may be regarded as the journalist of the Brethren Movement. Mackintosh popularised Darby more than any other Brethren author. In the early twentieth century, the Brethren's teachings, through Margaret E. Barber, greatly influenced the Little Flock or Church Assembly Hall of Watchman Nee and Witness Lee.

Darby has been credited with originating the pretribulational rapture theory. Dispensationalist beliefs about the fate of the Jews and the re-establishment of the Kingdom of Israel put dispensationalists at the forefront of Christian Zionism.

== Criticism ==
Charles Haddon Spurgeon, Pastor of the Metropolitan Tabernacle and contemporary of Darby, published criticism of Darby and Brethrenism. His main criticism was that Darby and the Plymouth Brethren rejected the vicarious purpose of Christ's obedience as well as imputed righteousness. He viewed these of such importance and so central to the Gospel that it led him to publish this statement about the rest of their belief in the Sword and Trowel.

James Grant wrote: "With the deadly heresies entertained and taught by the Plymouth Brethren, in relation to some of the most momentous of all the doctrines of the Gospel, and to which I have adverted at some length, I feel assured that my readers will not be surprised at any other views, however unscriptural and pernicious they may be, which the Darbyites have embraced and zealously seek to propagate".

== Works ==
- The Holy Bible a New Translation by J.N. Darby, a Parallel Edition, Bible Truth Publishers: Addison, Illinois.
- The Writings of J. N. Darby courtesy of Stem Publishing
- The Holy Scriptures (A New Translation from the Original Languages by J. N. Darby) courtesy of Stem Publishing
- A Letter on Free Will by J.N. Darby, Elberfeld, 23 October 1861
- The Collected Writings Of J. N. Darby, Ecclesiastical No. 1, Volume 1: The Character Of Office In The Present Dispensation
- The Watching Servant, Words of Truth: Belfast, Northern Ireland

== See also ==
- Benjamin Wills Newton, former friend of Darby who clashed with Darby on doctrine and practice, which led to the Exclusive Brethren – Open Brethren division
- Christian Zionism
- Cyrus I. Scofield
- Darby Bible
- Dispensationalism
- Eschatology
- Rapture
- Exclusive Brethren
- Fundamentalist Christianity
- List of people educated at Westminster School
- Miles J. Stanford
- Plymouth Brethren
- Robert Anderson (Scotland Yard) (1841–1918), Dispensational author, lawyer, British intelligence officer and London CID chief, in charge during Jack the Ripper murders.
- Watchman Nee

== Sources ==
- Akenson, Donald H. (2018). Exporting the Rapture: John Nelson Darby and the Victorian Conquest of North-American Evangelicalism. New York: Oxford University Press. ISBN 978-0-19-088270-9.
- Burnham, Jonathan (2006). A Story of Conflict: the Controversial Relationship between Benjamin Wills Newton and John Nelson Darby. Eugene: Wipf and Stock. ISBN 978-1-59752-759-0.
- Gribben, Crawford (2024). J.N. Darby and the Roots of Dispensationalism. New York (N.Y.): Oxford University Press. ISBN 978-0-19-093234-3.
- Groves, Henry (1866). Darbyism: Its Rise and Development and a Review of the "Bethesda Question" . London: Houlston & Wright.
- Hummel, Daniel G. (2023). The Rise and Fall of Dispensationalism: How the Evangelical Battle over the End Times Shaped a Nation. Grand Rapids, MI: Eerdmans. ISBN 978-0-8028-7922-6.
- Kelly, William. John Nelson Darby – as I Knew Him. Words of Truth: Belfast, Northern Ireland.
- Neatby, William B. (1901). A history of the Plymouth Brethren . London: Hodder & Stoughton.
- Stokes, George T. (October 1885). "John Nelson Darby". The Contemporary Review: 537–552.
- Stunt, Timothy (2004). "John Nelson Darby". Oxford Dictionary of National Biography (online ed.). Oxford University Press. doi:10.1093/ref:odnb/7141. (Subscription, Wikipedia Library access or UK public library membership required.)
- Turner, William G. (2021) [1901]. Unknown and Well Known : a Biography of John Nelson Darby. London: Chapter Two. ISBN 978-1-85307-230-7.
- Weremchuk, Max S. (2021). John Nelson Darby: A Biography: Updated and Expanded. El Cajon, CA: Southern California Seminary Press. ISBN 978-0-9864442-6-5.
