= Indian Brethren =

Christian Evangelical premillennial religious movement

- Classification: Protestant
- Orientation: Plymouth Brethren
- Polity: Congregationalist
- Region: India
- Origin: 1833
- Congregations: 1929
- Members: 449,550 (including children)
- Ministers: 2800 (ordained ministers and more than 4300 elders)
- Missionaries: 250
- Tertiary institutions: 11

The Indian Brethren are a Christian evangelical dispensational religious movement. Although they have some distinct characteristics, they have much in common, in both doctrine and practice, with the international Open Brethren movement, with whom nearly all of them are historically affiliated.

The Brethren in India, as in most other countries, do not usually regard themselves as a denomination in the usually understood sense, but rather as a largely informal network of like-minded autonomous local churches. They remain linked mostly through common support of missionaries, area conferences, youth ministries, and the work of itinerant preachers, who are usually called evangelists. The Brethren do not ordain clergy, and each local church, called an assembly, is led by a number of elders.

== Origins of the Brethren movement in India ==
The Plymouth Brethren was introduced into India in 1833 by Anthony Norris Groves, a dentist by profession who was one of the Plymouth Brethren pioneers in the United Kingdom. His ministry centred in the Godavari delta area of Bihar, Andhra Pradesh and Tamil Nadu.

John Arulappan followed Groves and lived "by faith" as a full-time worker. Through Arulappan's ministry, a revival broke out in Thirunelveli (Nellai) in Tamil Nadu, and many congregations were formed. Tamil David and Handley Bird followed in their footsteps and conducted revival meetings throughout Southern India in the late 1890s.

Some Indian Brethren disclaim the missionary connection, instead making a case for continuity with an unbroken line of Christians going back to what they believe were evangelistic endeavours of the Apostle Thomas in the first century. One Brethren website states :

Because Indian Brethren often used the title Plymouth Brethren they are often erroneously identified as the fruits of people from Plymouth who laboured in India. This is a false identification. The Brethren movement in India came up quite independently of the movement in Plymouth, and both movements recognized each other as a counterpart mainly because of identical doctrines and practices and not because one gave birth to the other.

== Indian Brethren characteristics ==
Brethren assemblies in India, as elsewhere, are extremely diverse, although the majority tend to be towards the conservative end of the spectrum. Nevertheless, they are having many of the same internal debates known among Brethren elsewhere. Contentious issues include whether assemblies should appoint pastors (a practice Brethren have traditionally rejected, but which has gained popularity in some parts of the Brethren world), whether to retain the absolute congregational autonomy that has long characterized the Brethren movement, or whether to adopt a more centralized system to safeguard against what some preachers perceive as heresies, whether to allow women to participate audibly in worship (traditionally, they do not), and whether and to what extent they should cooperate with non-Brethren Christians, and if so, under what conditions. Some assemblies will welcome a visitor from a non-Brethren church to partake of the Lord's Supper, while others have a more restrictive policy. Other issues being debated include the charismatic movement (which some assemblies have embraced, although most high-profile Brethren leaders, such as Johnson Philip, Principal of Brethren Theological College at Cochin University, Kerala, are opposed). Yet another bone of contention in some circles has been the relationship between Indian Brethren assemblies and workers and foreign organizations and missionaries, particularly when foreign funds are involved.

== Kerala Brethren ==
The Kerala Brethren are an important stream within the wider Indian Brethren movement, with some distinctive characteristics of its own. In 1872, the Brethren movement was spearheaded in Kerala by Mathai Upadeshi, a disciple of John Arulappan, who took the baton from Groves. In December 1894, a well-known gospel preacher, Tamil David, visited Kerala and preached on assurance on salvation, winning many converts.

Joseph Gelson Gregson, a Baptist preacher from England delivered sermons in the Convention at Maramon, Kerala. His Bible classes inspired several people in Kerala. In 1896 Gregson began preaching in Ayroor, Kumbanad. Preaching from the Book of Romans, he taught that through baptism a believer identifies with the death, burial, and resurrection of Jesus Christ and becomes a disciple of Christ. P. E. Mammen (Kumbanattu Achen, a priest of the Mar Thoma Syrian Church) attended these meetings and was subsequently baptised in Kunnamkulam by missionary Handley Bird. He went on to leave the Mar Thoma Church and become a Brethren preacher.

On March 9, 1899, following the example of the Brethren pioneers in Dublin, Ireland, four men met at the home of Kuttiyil Mathai, Kumbanad, to celebrate Holy Communion, or the Lord's Supper, as Brethren usually call it, without a priest. They were P. E. Mammen, his brother P. E. John, P. C. John, and P. C. Chacko, Melathethil. There were a few others like Koshy Mathunni who also attended the service but did not participate. The Brethren movement was subsequently spread by the work of missionaries and evangelists like Volbrecht Nagel, Handley Bird, E. H. Noel, Mahakavi K. V. Simon, M. E. Cherian, T. K. Samuel, K. G. Thomas and P. C. John.

== Statistics ==
As an informal network rather than an organization, the Indian Brethren have no central headquarters, and there is no universally accepted definition of what constitutes a Brethren assembly. This complicates the gathering of statistics. Most assemblies that regard themselves as Brethren will recognize similar assemblies which regard themselves as such, however. Aggressive evangelism has resulted in the founding of many undocumented assemblies, further compounding the problem of statistics. The evangelical publication Operation World estimates 135,000 adult believers in 1929 assemblies throughout India (449,550 if children are included). Some other estimates put the number more than twice as high. Internal Brethren sources say that the number of assemblies has increased to 2200 (including 1200 in Andhra Pradesh and 600 in Kerala) and the number of adult believers in fellowship to 200,000 since Operation World was published in 2010.

The closely related Assemblies Jehovah Shammah were founded by evangelist Bakht Singh and are organized largely on Brethren principles with adaptations to Indian culture. Despite some differences from the older Brethren movement that was the fruit of British missionary efforts (such as his encouragement for women to take part audibly in worship), many Indian and foreign Brethren "recognize" the Assemblies Jehovah Shammah as a subset of the Open Brethren movement, albeit one that developed independently. Statistically, they are counted separately. Operation World claims 910 Assemblies Jehovah Shammah with 310,000 affiliates, 95,000 of them adults.

== Schools ==
- Clarence High School

== Hospital ==
- Tiruvalla Medical Mission Hospital (Thiruvalla)
- TMM hospital (Mannamaruthi)
- TMM Hospital ( Vazhoor)
- Shalom Benevolent Foundation ( Palliative Care Unit, Kollam)
- Agape Mental Health and Research Institute, Pathanamthitta

== Orphanages ==
- Bethesda Boys Home, Irinjalakkuda
- Bird's Memorial Children's Home, Chennai
- Daya Vihar Orphanage, Thiruvalla
- Rehoboth Girls Orphanage, Thrissur

== See also ==
- Tiruvalla Medical Mission Hospital
- Plymouth Brethren
