= Kerala Brethren =

Christian denomination in India

- Classification: Protestant
- Orientation: Plymouth Brethren, Open Brethren
- Theology: Dispensationalism
- Polity: Congregationalist
- Region: Kerala, India
- Origin: 1899
- Branched from: Saint Thomas Christians
- Congregations: 600

The Kerala Brethren are a group somewhat similar to the Open Brethren movement but they are not one and the same. The movement in Kerala began in 1898 in the South Indian State of Kerala, when four Syrian Christian (Nasrani) men who came from traditional churches gathred for Lord's supper at Kumbanad. Several others gathered with them, and later became part of this first assembly in Kerala.

== History ==
Many Indian Christians believe that the Apostle Thomas brought the Christian message to India in 52AD. In the words of an Indian hymn, "...It was his mission to espouse India to the One-Begotten...." Some Indian Brethren disclaim their missionary origins, instead making a case for historical continuity with the First-Century converts of the Apostle Thomas, claiming that for several centuries Christians on the Malabar coast (modern Kerala) followed what Brethren believe to have been the New Testament model of church organisation and worship, with no clergy, and that clericalism began to creep in only after 345 AD, when seventy-two families belonging to seven Jewish clans followed Thomas of Cana from Iraq to Kodungalloor, which is now in Kerala. Thomas of Cana, they claim, brought in bishops and deacons, changing the practices of the Kerala Christians. This interpretation of history is not widely shared by non-Brethren Christians, however.

The modern Brethren movement was introduced into states North of Kerala (mostly Andhra Pradesh) in 1833 by Anthony Norris Groves, a dentist turned missionary who was one of the original Plymouth Brethren pioneers in Ireland.

A renewal began to take root in Kerala when Mathai Upadeshi, who had been an (Anglican) CMS evangelist from Tirunelveli, arrived in 1872. Another early preacher was Justhus Joseph, also known as Vidwankutty, a Tamil Brahmin and also a CMS priest like Mathai Upadeshi. He arrived in Kerala in 1875, but his ministry declined after the failure of his prediction that Jesus Christ would return in 1881. The first round created much awakening but it did not result in a clear cut Brethren Movement in Kerala.

A second wave of revival in Kerala started in 1894 with the arrival of V.D. David, better known in Kerala as Tamil David, and L.M. Wordsmith, the latter an Indian Tamil from Colombo, Sri Lanka. They were joined by Herbert Handley Bird, who established assemblies in Northern Kerala. They were helped by Baptist preacher and Keswick Convention speaker J.G. Gregson, who visited Kerala in 1896. He also preached in Ayroor, near Kumbanad, paving the way for several Keralities to conduct the first Brethren "meeting" (as they usually call their services) there in 1899.

== Schools ==
- Clarence High School

== Hospital ==
- Tiruvalla Medical Mission Hospital
  - TMM hospital (Mannamaruthi)
  - TMM Hospital (Vazhoor)
- Shalom Benevolent Foundation ( Palliative Care Unit, Kollam)
- Agape Mental Health and Research Institute, Pathanamthitta

== Orphanages ==
- Bethesda Boys Home, Irinjalakkuda
- Daya Vihar Orphanage, Thiruvalla
- Rehoboth Girls Orphanage, Thrissur

== Notable people ==
- M. E. Cherian
- Anthony Norris Groves
- P. C. John
- Volbrecht Nagel
- K. V. Simon

== See also ==
- Indian Brethren
- Plymouth Brethren
