= K. T. Thomas (pastor) =

Pastor for Pentecostal Church of God

Personal details
- Born: 18 June 1927 Kallissery, Kerala, India
- Died: 11 April 2011 (aged 83) New Delhi, Delhi, India

Pastor K. T. Thomas (18 June 1927 – 11 April 2011) was born in 1927 to Idichandy Thomas and Dinamma at Kallissery, Kerala, India.

== Life ==
He was a Brethren believer and had a close relation with the Malayalam Christian poet K. V. Simon. In 1953, he was appointed as Central Secretariat in New Delhi, India. In 1956, under Pastor M.K.Chacko started his ministry at Karol Bagh, Delhi, India. In 1969, he formed the IPC Northern Region with other few church ministers. He died on 11 April 2011 after more than five decades of Christian ministry in northern India.
