= Assemblies Jehovah Shammah =

Religious group

- Classification: Protestant
- Orientation: Independent / Plymouth Brethren
- Polity: Congregationalist
- Region: India, Pakistan; some congregations elsewhere
- Origin: 1842
- Congregations: 910 (in India)
- Members: 310,000 (In India, including children)

The Assemblies Jehovah Shammah are an evangelical Christian network of churches that originated in India, which is still home to the great majority of them. The evangelical publication Operation World estimates their numbers, as of 2010, at 310,000 adults and children in 910 assemblies, as their churches are generally known. Other sources estimate upwards of two thousand congregations, with a large presence in the State of Andhra Pradesh. The movement was founded in 1942 by evangelist Bakht Singh, whose theology and ecclesiology were much influenced by the Open Brethren. Although historically distinct from the Indian Brethren movement, which originated from missionary endeavours, the Assemblies Jehovah Shammah have a lot in common with it and are sometimes (but not always) considered a part of the Brethren movement worldwide.

== Theology and ecclesiology ==
Theologically, the Assemblies Jehovah Shammah are a conservative evangelical movement placing a great emphasis on the preaching and expounding of scripture. They are a lay movement with no ordained clergy, and each congregation is led by elders who take responsibility for the spiritual needs of those in fellowship. Assemblies Jehovah Shammah do not have a formal membership, but regard any Christian who has been baptised as a believer and attends regularly as being part of their fellowship. Holy Communion is celebrated weekly as part of a largely informal worship service, with any believer in the congregation who feels "moved by the Holy Spirit" offering prayers, sharing scriptures, or suggesting hymns. This period of free worship is followed by an hour-long sermon. In these matters, the Assemblies Jehovah Shammah greatly resemble the Open Brethren, but with certain adaptations to Indian culture, such as seating the congregation on mats on the floor. Unlike much of the wider Brethren movement, however, the Assemblies Jehovah Shammah have never restricted women from participating audibly in worship; until the last two decades, the great majority of Brethren assemblies around the world had a policy of reserving the "vocal" roles in worship to men only. Much (though not all) of the Indian Brethren movement remains very conservative and resistant to the changes that have occurred in some parts of the Brethren world in the last generation. This is one of the lines of demarcation between the Assemblies Jehovah Shammah and the older Indian Brethren movement.

Although the Assemblies Jehovah Shammah developed independently of the Indian Brethren movement, the many similarities between the two movements mean that the Assemblies Jehovah Shammah is often considered part of the Brethren movement worldwide. It is categorized as such by the World Christian Encyclopedia. Indian Brethren theologian and historian Thottukadavil Eapen Koshy also regards them as such, as did the late Scottish Brethren missionary, Daniel Smith. In Pakistan, unlike India, the Assemblies Jehovah Shammah operate under the Brethren label and there is no line of demarcation between them and the older, missionary-founded, Brethren movement.

Those who regard the Assemblies Jehovah Shammah as Brethren generally categorize them as Open Brethren, in view of their willingness to work and worship together with Christians of other denominations. Their highly centralized leadership, however, is not typical of Open Brethren, for whom complete congregational autonomy is paramount, and may be more similar to the "connectional" model known among the Exclusive Brethren. Although Bakht Singh taught congregational autonomy, in practice he maintained tight centralized control over the movement until his death in 2000.

If counted as part of the wider Open Brethren movement, the Assemblies Jehovah Shammah comprise some forty percent of all Brethren in India, and fifteen to twenty percent of all Brethren worldwide.

=== The charismatic movement ===
Although Bakht Singh believed in praying for divine healing and some people attributed supernatural healings to his prayers, he was a cessationist and opposed to the Pentecostal and charismatic movements. He believed that the so-called sign gifts, such as miracles, divine healing, and speaking in tongues were given to the early church for the specific purpose of authenticating the apostles, and "ceased" with the death of the last apostle. If people were healed in response to his own prayers, he believed that was a sovereign act of God, not attributable to any "gift" of his. Some Assemblies Jehovah Shammah have, however, embraced the charismatic movement since his time.

== Assemblies Jehovah Shammah Worldwide ==
The Assemblies Jehovah Shammah form a significant part of the Brethren movement in Pakistan, where Bakht Singh began preaching while it was still a part of British India. The movement has spread outside of the Indian subcontinent through Indian emigration. Some congregations may now be found in Australia.

== See also ==
- Plymouth Brethren
