= K. T. Thomas =

K. T. Thomas may refer to:

- K. T. Thomas (judge) (born 1937), judge of the Supreme Court of India
- K. T. Thomas (pastor) (1927–2011), pastor of the Indian Pentecostal Church of God
