= Joseph Gelson Gregson =

English Baptist missionary (1835–1909)

Joseph Gelson Gregson (1835–1909) was an English Baptist missionary to the Indian sub-continent during the British Raj.

As a British Indian Army chaplain, he worked hard to achieve total abstinence from alcohol among British Indian Army soldiers, his major achievement being the Soldiers Total Abstinence Association (STAA) that he founded in 1862 and was recognized for its military value. He played a major role during 1896 in the formation of the Kerala Brethren church in Kerala, South India. Through his preachings at Lonavla in 1895, he brought about the spiritual awakening of the social reformer Pandita Ramabai. He used to preach at major, large-scale Christian spiritual gatherings such as Maramon Convention in Kerala and Keswick Convention in Cumbria, North West England.

== Early life ==
Gregson was baptized at the now defunct St. Luke's, London, Finsbury (a former Anglican parish). Later, he became a member of Baptist Church, ordained as a minister and chose to become a missionary to India. After the Sepoy Mutiny of 1857 was concluded, he was sent to India to serve as a missionary of Baptist Missionary Society during 1858 to 1869 and was mainly stationed at Agra.

On 26 December 1861, he married Mary Anne, eldest daughter of N Brice, at Dinapore Cantonment while he was based in Monghyr (Munger, Bihar).

== Early ministry and Indian army chaplaincy ==
Gregson had served in British India as an Army Chaplain and he worked hard to realize total abstinence from alcohol among soldiers of British Indian Army. In 1862, he founded the Soldiers Total Abstinence Association (STAA). Under Gregson's leadership, the STAA grew in importance by absorbing regimental temperance societies. One military admirer described him The Apostle of Temperance in the British Army. He observed, in 1886, that "To such an extent has it prevailed, that the heathen regard the use of intoxicating liquor as a sign of a Christian."

In 1873, due to Gregson's hard work during his stay as a missionary at Agra, the Havelock Memorial Chapel at Agra was constructed in memory of Henry Havelock, who had founded the first Baptist Chapel of Agra in 1832.

From 1879 to 1886, Gregson served as the pastor of Union Church, Mussoorie (that was officially established in 1869). During this period, he ensured regular Sunday School classes, mid-week Bible reading meetings at homes. He also organized regular meetings at the Soldiers' Institute in nearby cantonment town of Landour and at the Woodstock School there.

== Return to England ==
Gregson belonged to the Elm Grove Baptist Church and after completing his service in India, Gregson retired to Southsea by 1886.

Gregson addressed the Keswick Convention of North England in 1886. Although a Baptist, he chose to be a part of the Keswick Evangelist team because of their swing to Modernism.

In 1892, Gregson assumed the leadership of the Soldier's Institute at Portsmouth from its founder Sarah Robinson aka soldier's friend. However, he could hold this responsibility only for two years and his friend Sidney Smith had to take over in 1894, as Gregson was once again travelling to India.

== Visits to South Africa, Ceylon and India ==
In 1894, as an ex-Indian Army Chaplain, he left England once again to visit South Africa, Ceylon, and India.

In 1894, Gregson visited South Africa during a time when Andrew Murray, Keswick and Higher Life leader, was ministering there.

In 1895, Gregson held special mission services in Bombay. In April 1895, Gregson preached again at the Lanouli camp (an old Methodists camp with tents, located at Lanouli or Lanowli known as Lonavala today, and renovated in 1893). It was during this particular meeting at Lanouli camp, where Pandita Ramabai, the famous Indian social reformer (who had already become a Christian in 1887), experienced a deep spiritual awakening and professed to have been touched by the Holy Spirit. After this meeting, she and her friend together had a conversation with Gregson where she asked several questions which he answered based on the Biblical Scripture much to the satisfaction of Ramabai. This encounter with Gregson, an active promoter of the Keswick spirituality, inspired Ramabai to attend and address the Keswick Convention during a return journey back from the US to India.

== Visit to Kerala ==
In 1896, Gregson visited Kerala and during February 1897, spoke at the Maramon Convention, which is regarded as the largest Christian convention in Asia. Although a Baptist preacher, he was sympathetic to the Plymouth Brethren perspective and helped the local Christians to establish the first Brethren Assembly in the central Travancore kingdom (now Kerala).

His visit to Kerala was organised by C. P. Thomas from Ayroor, a village near Kumbanad in Central Travancore. Gregson held many talks and classes with the priests and laymen within the Mar Thoma Church, after obtaining approval from the Malankara Metropolitan. Due to his preaching, many felt assured of receiving salvation. Gregson organized a month-long Bible course based on Paul the Apostle's Epistles to the Colossians and Romans. As a Baptist preacher, he also discussed Baptism as an important subject in his talks. As a result of his activity, few priests and laymen had decided to receive Adult Baptism, even though they were already baptized as children. These actions were not acceptable to the Mar Thoma church's traditional teachings and therefore, many Mar Thoma Church leaders became infuriated and banned Gregson from ministering in the Church.

Although Gregson had to leave, as an indirect result of his mission work, in 1897, the vicar of Kumbanad and Eraviperoor Mar Thoma Churches, P E Mammen (Kumbanattachen), received baptism from Handley Bird, a Brethren missionary, at Kunnamkulam. Eventually, his ministry led to the establishment of Brethren movement, supported by Volbrecht Nagel who celebrated the Holy Supper on 19 March 1899 at Kunnamkulam.

== Death ==
He died at Totnes, Devon County in 1909 at the age of 73.

== Books ==
Gregson authored a number of works across three decades:

- A plea for the dis-establishment of the Irish Church : by J. Gelson Gregson, minister of Kent Street chapel. [1868]
- "Nehushtan." The annual temperance sermon, preached in Kent Street Chapel, Portsea, [1871]
- The Soldiers' Temperance Manual, how to form and work a Temperance Society in the Army [1878]
- Through the Khyber Pass to Sherpore Camp, Cabul : an account of temperance work among our soldiers in the Cabul Field Force [1883]
- The drink traffic in India [1884]
- His yoke is easy : a personal narrative of finding rest [1887]
- Drinking and the drink traffic in India : a lecture [1887]
- Drinking and the drink problem in India. [1887]
- The life of a Christian soldier in a barrack-room : Private Robert Jones, HM.'s 65th Regt [1894]
- Among the Syrian Christians in Travancore. [1897]

== See also ==
- Early Indian Plymouth Brethren V Nagel and P C John
- Maramon Convention
