= Anthony A. Hoekema =

Dutch-American theologian (1913–1988)

- Born: Anthony Andrew Hoekema; 26 July 1913; Drachten, Netherlands
- Died: 17 October 1988 (aged 75); Frederick, Maryland
- Education: Calvin College (A.B.); University of Michigan (M.A.); Calvin Theological Seminary (Th.B.); Princeton Theological Seminary (Th.D., 1953)
- Occupations: Theologian, minister, academic
- Years active: 1944–1979
- Employer: Calvin Theological Seminary
- Known for: Professor of Systematic Theology at Calvin Theological Seminary
- Notable work: The Four Major Cults; The Bible and the Future; Saved by Grace
- Title: Professor of Systematic Theology
- Spouse: Ruth Brink
- Children: 4

Anthony Andrew Hoekema (July 26, 1913 – 17 October 1988) was a Dutch-American Calvinist minister and theologian who served as professor of Systematic theology at Calvin Theological Seminary, Grand Rapids, for twenty-one years.

== Early life and education ==
Hoekema was born in 1913 in Drachten in the Netherlands but immigrated to the United States in 1923. He attended Calvin College (A.B.), the University of Michigan (M.A.), Calvin Theological Seminary (Th.B.) and Princeton Theological Seminary (Th.D., 1953).

== Career and ministry ==
Hoekema was ordained as a minister in the Christian Reformed Church (CRC) in 1944. After pastoring several CRC churches from 1944–1956 he became Associate Professor of Bible at Calvin College in 1956. From 1958 to 1979, when he retired, he was Professor of Systematic Theology at Calvin Theological Seminary in Grand Rapids, Michigan. Hoekema spent two sabbatical years in Cambridge, England in 1965–1966 and in 1973–1974.

== Views ==
Hoekema’s theology came from the Reformed tradition. He emphasized the authority of Scripture as understood through historic Reformed confessions. At the center of his theology was the covenant of grace, which he saw as upholding both the sovereignty of God and human responsibility. He rejected views that downplayed free will, insisting that God’s grace enables faith, repentance, and obedience. His view of humanity emphasized the image of God, damaged by sin but renewed through Christ.

Hoekema also engaged contemporary evangelical movements, especially Pentecostalism and the Charismatic movement. He affirmed the Holy Spirit’s ongoing work in believers but rejected the idea of a second, post‑conversion baptism in the Holy Spirit marked by speaking in tongues. He argued that the New Testament presents Spirit baptism as part of conversion itself, and he viewed miraculous gifts like tongues as primarily tied to the apostolic era rather than as ongoing norms for the modern church.

In eschatology, Hoekema was a leading advocate of amillennialism. He opposed dispensational premillennialism and postmillennialism, teaching instead that the kingdom of God is both already present through Christ and not yet fully realized. He interpreted apocalyptic texts, including the book of Revelation, as symbolic and in harmony with the rest of Scripture.

== Personal life and death ==
Hoekema married Ruth Brink in 1942, and together they had four children. He died on October 17, 1988 after experiencing a heart attack in Frederick, Maryland.

== Publications ==
Among his best-known works are:

- The Four Major Cults: Christian Science, Jehovah's Witnesses, Mormonism, Seventh-day Adventism (1963)
- What About Tongue Speaking? (1966)
- Holy Spirit Baptism (1972)
- Amillennialism (1977)
- The Bible and the Future (1979)
- Created in God's Image (1986)
- Saved by Grace (1989)
