= Dispenser =

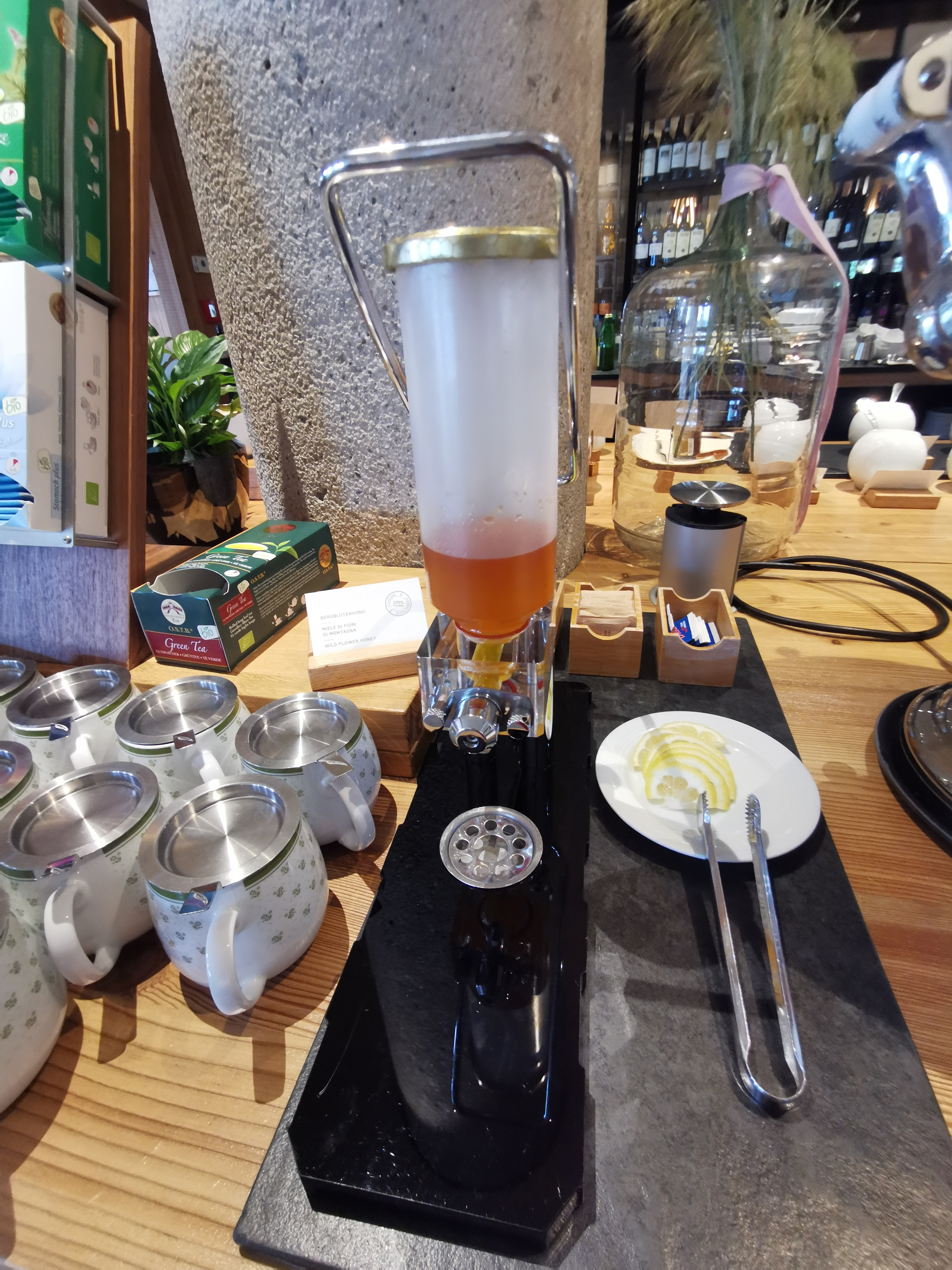
Honey dispenser

The term dispenser typically imply a machine or container which is designed to release a specific amount of its content, usually liquids or powders/fine granular materials.

In common usage, a dispenser may also refer to:

== Devices ==
=== Candy ===
- Klik Rockets Dispenser, a candy dispenser
- Pez dispenser, a candy dispenser

=== Hygiene ===
- Automatic toothpaste dispenser, a device used to contain and dispense toothpaste
- Paper-towel dispenser, a device that dispenses paper towels
- Soap dispenser, a device that, when manipulated or triggered appropriately, yields soap
- Hand sanitizer dispenser, a device that gives out hand sanitiser

=== Medicine ===
- Dispenser (prescription), a health professional who makes up prescriptions, such as a pharmacist or a pharmaconomist
- Hearing aid dispenser, an entity that sells hearing aid
- Pill dispenser, items which release medication at specified times

=== Others ===
- Cash dispenser, Device used to process cash present operation in automated teller machine (ATM)
- Label dispenser, machines built to simplify the process of removing a label from its liner or backing tape
- Media dispenser, a device for dispensing small units of liquid laboratory media
- Powder measure, a device for dispensing uniform amounts from a propellant hopper while handloading small arms ammunition
- Tape dispenser, an object that holds a roll of tape and has a mechanism at one end to shear the tape
- Vending machines, which dispense beverages, candy, chips, sandwiches, and other foods
- Water dispenser, a device designed to dispense hot or cold water
- Wine dispenser, a device designed to serve and preserve wines
- An automated dispenser used for order picking in warehouses

=== People ===
- Le Despenser, a surname, most commonly associated with Norman-English barons

== See also ==
- Dispensation (disambiguation)
- Dispensor (Transformers), fictional robot
- Dispensing (disambiguation)
