= M. E. Cherian =

Indian Christian evangelist (1917–1993)

The Reverend M. E. Cherian
- Born: 1917; Kuriannoor, Kerala, British India
- Died: October 2, 1993 (aged 75–76); Muthukulathoor, Tamil Nadu, India
- Occupations: Evangelist, Bible teacher, poet, hymn writer
- Era: 20th Century
- Known for: Founding YMEF, Madurai Bible School, Malayalam Christian hymns

Religious life
- Denomination: Kerala Brethren (Christian)
- Church: Protestant
- Movement: Kerala Brethren

M. E. Cherian (1917 – 2 October 1993), also known as "Kochu Sir" and "Podiyan," was an Indian Christian evangelist, Bible teacher, poet, and hymn writer. He was a key figure in the Kerala Brethren movement and is remembered for his pioneering missionary work, spiritual leadership, and contributions to Malayalam Christian hymnody.

== Early life and education ==
Cherian was born in 1917 in Kuriannoor, a village near Kozhencherry in the present-day Pathanamthitta district of Kerala, India. He was the fourth child of Kunjachan Upadeshi and Aleyamma. After a near-death experience in childhood, his family committed him to God's service following prayers at the Maramon Convention.

He had born again experience at the age of nine and was baptized shortly afterward. At fifteen, he passed the Malayalam Higher Examination, which was equivalent to a degree at the time, and began working as a teacher.

At the age of twenty-six, he resigned from his teaching profession to dedicate himself to full-time Christian ministry. He published his first book at thirty-one. When he launched Bala Sangham and the magazine Suviseshakan, he was thirty-six. At thirty-seven, he initiated the work of the Madurai Bible School. He was honoured with the prestigious Mahakavi K. V. Simon Award at the age of seventy-five.

== Ministry ==
In 1943, after Cherian had resigned from his teaching job to enter full-time Christian ministry, he founded the Young Men’s Evangelical Fellowship (YMEF) to mobilize and train young Christians for gospel work across India.

M. E. Cherian established the Madurai Bible School at Madurai in the year 1955, having moved from Kerala to Tamil Nadu in 1943 as a pioneer from the Kerala Brethren Assemblies. Deeply burdened for the spiritual needs of Tamil Nadu and India, he sought to reach as many as possible through all available means. The school began in a rented house, which also served as his family home, where he treated the students as part of his own household. For its first fifteen years, the Bible School operated without interruption under these modest conditions. Also in 1989, Cherian inaugurated the Brethren Bible Institute at Pathanamthitta and played supportive role during its formative years.

His ministry spanned decades, especially in Tamil Nadu and Kerala.

== Hymns and writings ==
Cherian was a known writer, contributing significantly to Malayalam Christian literature, having composed over 300 Christian hymns in Malayalam and authored 13 theological books on various topics, including Bible study, the disciplines of Christ, Church, and the Holy Spirit. Many of his hymns appear in Kristheeya Keerththanangal, the official hymn book of the Mar Thoma Syrian Church and in Seeyon Geethavali used by India Pentecostal Church He also initiated in establishing the first Malayalam Brethren musical ensemble – Madura Happy Melody.

His songs are notable for their theological clarity and poetic language, making them popular among Malayalam-speaking Christian communities in India and abroad.

=== Notable Hymns ===
Some of the most cherished and widely sung hymns written by M. E. Cherian include:

- "Yeshukristhu uyirthu jeevikkunnu"(യേശുക്രിസ്തു ഉയിര്‍ത്തു ജീവിക്കുന്നു)
- "Anugrahathin Adhipathiye" (അനുഗ്രഹത്തിനധിപതിയെ)
- "Ithuvareyenne Karuthiya Naathaa" (ഇതുവരെയെന്നെ കരുതിയ നാഥാ)
- "Krushum Eduthini Njan En Yeshuve" (ക്രൂശും എടുത്തിനി ഞാൻ എൻ യേശുവേ)
- "Maname Chanchalam Enthinayi" (മനമേ ചഞ്ചലമെന്തിനായ്)
- "Thunayenikkesuve" (തുണ എനിക്കേശുവെ)
- "Kripayerum Karthavilen Vishwasam (കൃപയേറും കർത്താവിലെൻ)
- "En Sankadangal Sakalavum Theernupoyi" (എൻ സങ്കടങ്ങൾ സകലവും തീർന്നുപോയി)
- "Aasrayam Yeshuvil Ennathinal" (ആശ്രയം യേശുവിൽ എന്നതിനാൽ)
- "Jeevaninte Uravidam Kristhuvatre" (ജീവന്റെ ഉറവിടം ക്രിസ്തുവത്രേ)
- "Sreeyesu Naamam Athishaya Naamam" (ശ്രീയേശുനാമം അതിശയ നാമം) (attributed)
- "Sthuthicheeduvin Keerthanangal" (സ്തുതിച്ചിടുവിൻ കീർത്തനങ്ങൾ)
- "Yehova Daivamam Vishudha Jaathi Naam" (യഹോവ ദൈവമാം വിശുദ്ധ ജാതി നാം)
- "Yeshuvinte Thiru Naamathinu" (യേശുവിന്റെ തിരു നാമത്തിനു)
- "Sreeyesu Nadha Nin Sneham" (ശ്രീയേശു നാഥാ നിൻ സ്നേഹം)
- "Ennesuve En Jeevane" (എന്നേശുവേ എൻ ജീവനെ)
- "Seeyon Sanchari Njan" (സീയോൻ സഞ്ചാരി ഞാൻ)

== Personal life ==
During his youth Cherian faced challenges in finding a bride due to his low income and short stature, but received several marriage proposals. He eventually married Mariamma, who was studying for Malayalam higher education. The couple had eight children, consisting of five boys and three girls.

== Death and legacy ==
M. E. Cherian died on 2 October 1993 in Muthukulathoor Village, near Madurai, Tamil Nadu, during a gospel trip. His legacy continues through the institutions he founded, the people he mentored, and the hymns he composed. Annual commemorations and ongoing reprints of his work keep his influence alive in Christian circles in South India.
