= Andrew Murray (minister) =

South African writer, teacher and Christian pastor (1828-1917)

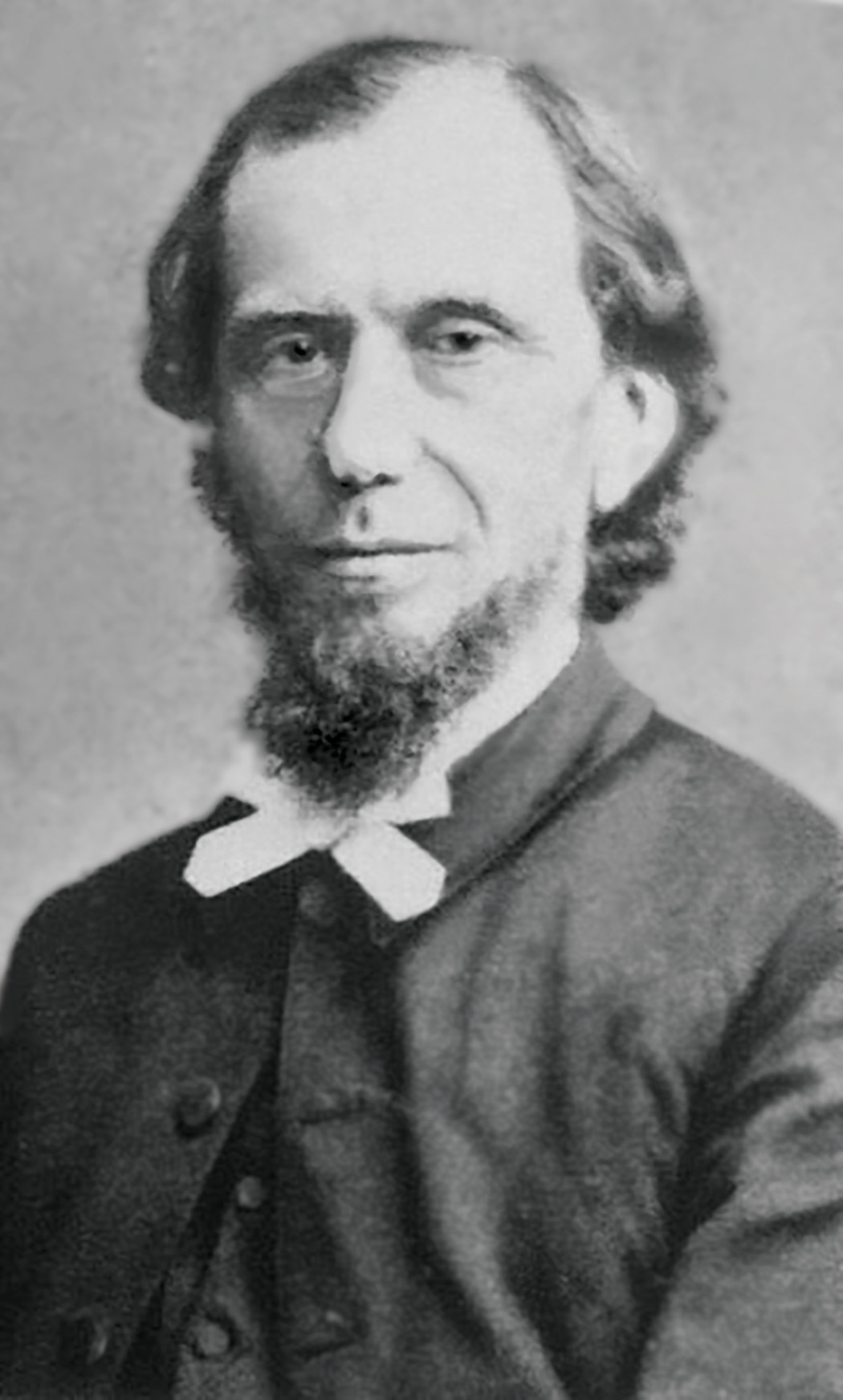
- Born: 9 May 1828; Graaff Reinet, South Africa
- Died: 18 January 1917 (aged 88); Wellington, South Africa
- Occupations: Pastor, author
- Spouse: Emma Rutherford

Andrew Murray (9 May 1828 – 18 January 1917) was a South African writer, teacher and Christian pastor. Murray considered missions to be "the chief end of the church".

== Early life and education ==
Andrew Murray was the second child of Andrew Murray Sr. (1794–1866), a Dutch Reformed Church missionary sent from Scotland to South Africa. He was born in Graaff Reinet, South Africa. His mother, Maria Susanna Stegmann, was of French Huguenot and German Lutheran descent.

Murray was sent to the University of Aberdeen in Scotland for his initial education, together with his elder brother, John. Both remained there until they obtained their master's degrees in 1845. During this time they were influenced by Scottish revival meetings and the ministry of Robert Murray McCheyne, Horatius Bonar, and William Burns. From there, they both went to the University of Utrecht where they studied theology. The two brothers became members of Het Réveil, a religious revival movement opposed to the rationalism which was in vogue in the Netherlands at that time. Both brothers were ordained by the Hague Committee of the Dutch Reformed Church on 9 May 1848 and returned to the Cape.

Murray married Emma Rutherford in Cape Town, South Africa, on 2 July 1856. They had eight children together (four boys and four girls).

== Residence in Utrecht ==
In 1846 they lived in the Minrebroederstraat (number unknown).

From 1847 to 1848 they lived at the Zadelstraat 39.

== Religious work in South Africa ==
Murray pastored churches in Bloemfontein, Worcester, Cape Town and Wellington, all in South Africa. He was a champion of the South African Revival of 1860.

In 1889, he was one of the founders of the South African General Mission (SAGM), along with Martha Osborn and Spencer Walton. After Martha Osborn married George Howe, they formed the South East Africa General Mission (SEAGM) in 1891. SAGM and SEAGM merged in 1894. Because its ministry had spread into other African countries, the mission's name was changed to Africa Evangelical Fellowship (AEF) in 1965. AEF joined with Serving In Mission (SIM) in 1998 and continues to this day.

Through his writings, Murray was also a key "Inner Life" or "Higher Life" or Keswick leader, and his theology of faith healing and belief in the continuation of the apostolic gifts made him a significant forerunner of the Pentecostal movement.

In 1894, Murray was visited by John McNeill and Rev. J Gelson Gregson, the ex-British Army Chaplain and Keswick convention speaker.

== Death ==
Murray died on 18 January 1917, at age 88. He was so influenced by Johann Christoph Blumhardt's Möttlingen revival that he included a portion of Friedrich Zündel's biography at the end of With Christ in the School of Prayer.

== Works ==
A bibliography compiled by D. S. B. Joubert estimates that Murray published over 240 books and tracts; this number includes about 50 books, many of them authored in both Dutch and English, including:

- Abide in Christ (1864 in Dutch, English publication 1882)
- Like Christ (1884)
- The New Life (1885 in Dutch, English publication 1891)
- With Christ in the School of Prayer (1885)
- Holy in Christ (1887)
- How to Raise Your Children for Christ (1887)
- The Spirit of Christ (1888)
- Wholly for God (1890 in Dutch, English publication 1893)
- Be Perfect (1893)
- Jesus Himself (1893)
- The Holiest of All: An Exposition of the Epistle to the Hebrews (1894)
- Let Us Draw Nigh (1894)
- Power of the Blood of Christ (1894)
- Why Do You Not Believe? (1894)
- The Believers Full Blessing of Pentecost (1894 in Dutch, English publication 1907)
- The Master's Indwelling (1895)
- Eagle Wings (1895)
- The Spiritual Life (1895)
- The Power of the Spirit (Extracts from William Law) (1895)
- Have Mercy upon Me (1895)
- Absolute Surrender (1895)
- Humility: The Journey Toward Holiness (1895)
- The Deeper Christian Life (1895)
- Waiting on God (1896)
- The Divine Indwelling (1896)
- Lord Teach Us to Pray, or, The Only Teacher (1896)
- The Mystery of the True Vine (1897)
- The Lord's Table (1897)
- The Ministry of Intercession (1897)
- Money (1897)
- The Dearth of Conversions (1897)
- The School of Obedience (1898)
- The Fruit of the Vine (1898)
- The Two Covenants (1898)
- Pray without Ceasing (1898)
- Divine Healing (1900)
- Thy Will Be Done (1900)
- Out of His Fullness (1900)
- Working for God! (1901)
- The Key to the Missionary Problem (1901)
- The Inner Chamber and the Inner Life (1905)
- Aids to Devotion (1909)
- The State of the Church (1911)
- The Prayer Life (1913)
- Back to Pentecost (1917)
- God's Will: Our Dwelling Place (1919)

== The "Secret" series ==
Andrew Murray had originally decided to publish a series of twelve pocket books, one for each month of the year. As only four were published during his lifetime, his family ultimately decided to release an additional eight pocket books based on various sermons and writings remaining at the time of his death. In order of publication, the "Secret" series was:

- The Secret of Intercession (1914)
- The Secret of Adoration (1914)
- The Secret of the Faith Life (1915)
- The Secret of Inspiration (1916)
- The Secret of the Abiding Presence
- The Secret of United Prayer
- The Secret of Fellowship
- The Secret of the Cross
- The Secret of Brotherly Love
- The Secret of Power from on High
- The Secret of Christ Our Life
- The Secret of the Throne of Grace
