= Dispensing =

Dispensing may refer to:

- Resin dispensing, an industrial process
- Remote dispensing, the use of automated systems to dispense prescription medications without an on-site pharmacist

== See also ==
- Dispensation (disambiguation)
- Dispenser (disambiguation)
