= Volbrecht Nagel =

German missionary to India (1867–1921)

The Reverend Volbrecht Nagel
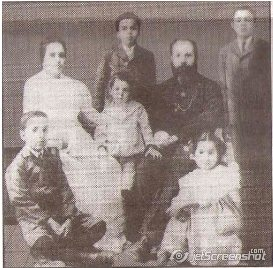
- Born: 3 November 1867; Stammheim, Grand Duchy of Hesse
- Died: 12 May 1921 (aged 53); Wiedenest, Germany
- Education: Basel Mission Training Institute
- Occupation: Missionary
- Known for: Pioneer of the Kerala Brethren movement
- Spouse: Harriet Mitchell
- Children: 5 sons, 2 daughters

Volbrecht Nagel (3 November 1867 – 12 May 1921) was a German missionary to the Malabar coast of India. Initially associated with the Evangelical Lutheran Church, he later joined the Open Brethren, and is remembered now as a pioneer of the Kerala Brethren movement.

== Life ==
Volbrecht Nagel was born on 3 November 1867 in Stammheim (belonging to the Grand Duchy of Hesse). He grew up in a religious family, but lost his parents, Peter and Elisabeth, when he was eight years old. At the age of 18, Nagel claimed to have been born again after hearing the gospel from a cobbler turned itinerant preacher. With a desire to be a missionary, he moved to Basel, Switzerland, joined the Basel Mission Training Institute in 1886 and graduated in 1892. He was ordained in the Evangelical Lutheran Mission in 1893.

Nagel came to Cannanore on the Malabar Coast as a Reverend in December 1893. He became the head of the Basel Mission center in Vaniankulam. The burden of running the schools and the small-scale industries of the Basel Mission in Vaniankulam became a stumbling block in his goal of independent ministry. In 1896, he left the Lutheran Church and Vaniankulam and went south without an aim. On his trip, he saw a prayer center in Kunnamkulam and met Paramel Itoop, a new believer. He decided to start his work at Kunnamkulam, an ancient bastion of Christianity in India.

To be part of the local community, he learned Malayalam. The community in Kunnamkulam received him as one of their own, as he wrote and spoke in Malayalam. On April 1, 1897, he married Harriet Mitchell, an Anglo-Indian who was a teacher at Kunnamkulam. They had five sons and two daughters. One son and one daughter died in early childhood. Harriet Nagel died on 27 January 1935. Whilst at Kunnamkulam he was able to help many people to become faithful disciples. Among them was a Syrian priest named Mammen. A few months after their marriage, they went to the Nilgiris and met the English Open Brethren Missionary Handley Bird. The following June, Nagel was baptized by immersion by Bird at Coimbatore. In 1906, he started an orphanage and a home for widows at Nellikunnu near Thrissur City named Rehoboth, which still stands today.

In 1914, Nagel traveled back to his native Germany. His plan was to send his older children to England for education and return to India in six months, but the beginning of World War I prevented his return. As a national of the German Empire, he could not enter British-administered Malabar, so he moved to Switzerland. Harriet and three children were back in Malabar Coast, while the two older children were in England. The letter he sent to the assembly fellowship in Paravur in 1917 reflects the hunger in his heart for souls in Malabar. That letter contained the following words: "My sweetest treasures are in India. My heart belongs there." But his desire was not fulfilled. He suffered from palsy and became bedridden. While teaching at Wiedenest Bible School, Nagel had a stroke and died on 12 May 1921 and was buried there. Harriet had been able to reach Germany and take care of him.

== Writings ==
In 1898, Nagel wrote a book called Christian Baptism. He wrote many songs and hymns in Malayalam that are sung even today by all Christian denominations. Nagel is regarded with great esteem by the Malayalee Christian community for all his work in bringing the Gospel to Kerala. He wrote an article called 'The visible church' which includes an account of his own conversion.

=== Malayalam hymns ===
Nagel's mother tongue was German. He became fluent in Malayalam and composed hymns in that language, which are still used in church services.

A few of the hymns in Malayalam and their translations in English are given below:

- Snehathin Idayanam Yesuway; Wazhium sathyaum nee mathremay (Jesus, the loving shepherd, you are the only way and the truth)
- Ninnodu Praarthyppan Priya Pithaway (Our dear father, we are coming for prayer) – Prayer song
- Jayam jayam Kollum Naam, Jayam Kollum Naam (Victorious, victorious, we will be victorious) – Victory song
- Deivathinte æka putren paapikale rakshippan (God's only son died on the cross to save the sinners) – Christ's passion and death
- Maranam jayicha veera (Hero that won over death) – Resurrection
- Yesu varum vegathil – Aswaasamay (Jesus will be coming soon) – Second Coming
- Ente Jeevanam Yesuway (Jesus, my life) – Comfort
- En Yesu En Sangeetham (My song shall be of Jesus)
- Samayamam rathathil njaan swargayatra cheyyunu (I am traveling towards heaven on the chariot of time) – included by music director G. Devarajan in the 1970 movie Aranazhika Neram; since the time it was sung during Sathyan's funeral in June 1971 it has become the most popular song at funerals

Nagel's translations include:

- Papakadam theerkuvan (What can wash away my sins, by Robert Lowry)
- Yeshu enn swanatham, Hallelujah (Blessed Assurance, by Fanny Crosby)
- Yeshuvin thirupadathil irunnu kelka naam (Sing them over again to me, by Philip Bliss)
- Kristhuvinte daanam ethra maduram (Like a river glorious, by Frances Ridley Havergal)
- Yeshuvil en thozhane kande (I have found a friend in Jesus, by Charles William Fry)

== See also ==
- Hermann Gundert
- Johann Ernst Hanxleden

== Bibliography ==
- Mahakavi K. V. Simon: Workers. in: History of the Malankara Brethren Churches (Malankarayilae Verpadu Sabhakalude Charithram). Tiruvalla, Kerala, India: Sathyam Publications, 1999, pp. 336–341 (first published in 1938).
- T. E. Easow: Brethren Prasthanam Logamegum (in Malayalam). 1981.
- W. T. Stunt et al.: Turning the World Upside Down. A Century of Missionary Endeavour. Bath, Somerset: Echoes of Service, 1972.
