= K. V. Simon =

Indian poet

The Reverend Mahakavi K. V. Simon
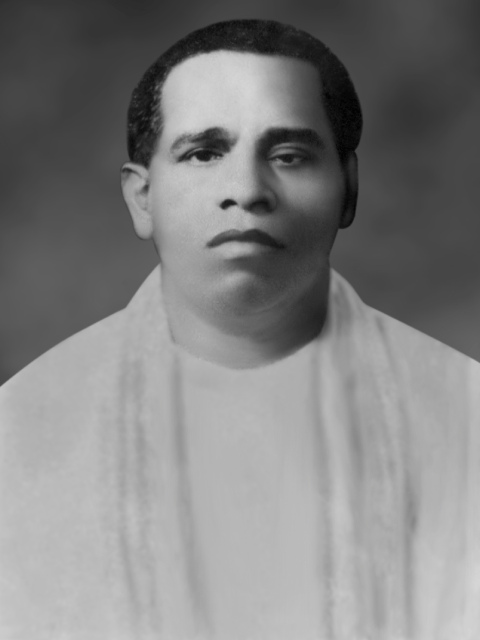
- Born: Kunnampurathu Varghese Simon; 1883; Kerala, India
- Died: 1944 (aged 60–61); Kerala, India
- Occupations: Poet, author, theologian, historian
- Notable work: "Veha Viharam"; Vedantha Rathnavali, Messihacharitram, Satyaprakashini
- Movement: Open Brethren

Religious life
- Religion: Christianity
- Denomination: Kerala Brethren
- Church: Protestant

Mahakavi Kunnampurathu Varghese Simon (7 February 1883 – 20 February 1944) was a Malayalam Christian poet from Kerala, India. He was also a musician, a teacher, a reformer, a writer, a Bible scholar and apologist. Simon authored around three hundred hymns or poems and some thirty books. K. V. Simon was given the title Mahakavi (Dean of Poets) by the Sahitya Parishad (Academy of Literature). His major work was Veda Viharam, based on the biblical Genesis. It was this work, published in 1931, that earned his name among the noted Malayalam poets. Simon was a prominent leader of the Kerala Brethren movement.

== Early life ==
Simon was born in 1883 to Varghese, a scholar of the Hindu Puranas, and Kandama, a poet. In 1900, he married Ayroor Pantholipeedikayil Rahelamma (later known as Ayroor Amma). They had two daughters: an older daughter born in 1925 who died shortly after birth, and a second daughter, Chinnamma, born in May 1927.

Mentored by his brother K.V. Cherian, Simon began writing poetry at the age of eight. In 1896, he became a teacher at the age of thirteen at Mar Thoma School, Edayaranmula.

Simon was a polyglot. He was a scholar in his native Malayalam, as well as in Sanskrit and Tamil, and also mastered English, Hindi, Telugu, Kannada, Greek, Latin, Hebrew, and Syriac.

== Simon as a religious leader ==
Although brought up in a Christian family, Simon claimed that he did not really understand the Christian message until he listened to evangelist Tamil David in 1895. He went on to become one of the pioneers of the Kerala Brethren movement, and a leading figure in the wider Indian Brethren movement. Many prominent Christian leaders in India, both Brethren and non-Brethren, were mentored by Simon. These included Pandit M. M. John, K. E. Abraham (the founder of the India Pentecostal Church), and K. G. Kurien and K. G. Thomas.

Simon was known as a debater. In the 1920s, he took on Krishan Namboodri (who later became known as Swami Agamanda), Rishiram, and R. C. Das, who were promoting Hindutva and opposing conversion. Some of his books covered areas of Christian apologetics such as Prathiyukthi, and Satyaprakashini and Krushil Maricha Kristhu (Christ who died on the Cross), — which were compiled from notes prepared from his rebuttals to anti-Christian critics. He also wrote Satyaprakashini, an apologetics book attempting to refute Hindu critics by quoting from Hindu scriptures.

Simon also spoke out against Russian traveller Nicolas Notovitch's controversial claims that Jesus had visited India between the ages of twelve and thirty, studying under Hindu, Buddhist, and Jain teachers. Notovitch claimed to have been shown ancient literature confirming these claims when he visited Ladakh. In Krushil Maricha Kristhu (Christ who died on the Cross), Simon cited research by German scholar Max Muller, which he said exposed Notovitch's claims as a hoax.

Simon composed more than 300 songs and lyrics (many of which are still) used among Christian groups. He rendered the entire book of Genesis in poetry, and named in Malayalam language as "Vedaviharam". It is a literary classic, and it earned him the title of Mahakavi (Dean of Poets), conferred on him by the Sahitya Parishad (Academy of Literature).

== Legacy ==
Mahakavi K. V. Simon’s posthumous legacy can be measured by his enduring influence on Malayalam literature and the Kerala Christians especially on the Kerala Brethren movement.

After his death in 1944, his impact has remained visible in several key areas:

- Church Liturgy: Many among the hundreds of hymns he composed continue to be popularly used in worship services across various denominations in Kerala, including the Kerala Brethren, Mar Thoma Syrian Church, the CSI Church and various independent churches. e.g.,
- Literary Canon: His epic poem remains a foundational classic in Malayalam literature, studied for its unique synthesis of Biblical narrative and traditional Indian poetic forms.
- Ecclesial Reform: As a pioneer of the Kerala Brethren movement, his "scripture-only" approach and emphasis on indigenous expression continue to shape and refine the theological identity of independent churches in the region including the Pentecostal churches.
- Posthumous Recognition: Even decades after his death, scholars have confirmed his literary reputation, attributing to him as the Milton of the East, most recently highlighted in Varghese Mathai's 2023 biography in English, which is meant to inform his otherwise regional influence to a global audience.

After his death, his family continued the ministry. Simon’s wife Rahelamma died in 1980. Simon's daughter Chinnamma married Kochumuriyil Mathew George of the same town Edayaranmula in 1941. They had seven children actively involved in the Christian ministry, and Chinnamma died in 2018.
