= T. E. Koshy =

- Born: Thottukadavil Eapen Koshy; September 28, 1933; Kerala, India
- Died: August 28, 2012 (aged 78); Syracuse, New York, U.S.
- Occupations: Christian pastor; evangelical chaplain; author
- Known for: Evangelical chaplaincy at Syracuse University; founding International Friendship Evangelism; founding International Assembly (Syracuse)
- Spouse: Indira Koshy
- Children: Jay Koshy

Thottukadavil Eapen (T. E.) Koshy (September 28, 1933 – August 28, 2012) was an India-born Malayali Christian pastor, author, and longtime evangelical chaplain associated with Syracuse University in New York. He founded the ministry International Friendship Evangelism (IFE) and helped establish the non-denominational congregation International Assembly in the Syracuse area. (Note: Some sources describe International Assembly and IFE as closely linked ministries originating from Koshy’s outreach to international students.)

He co-authored The Invested Life: Making Disciples of All Nations One Person at a Time with author Joel C. Rosenberg, published shortly before Koshy's death in 2012.

== Early life and education ==
Koshy was born in Kerala, India, and later pursued studies in multiple countries. Sources report that he earned degrees in fields including literature, philosophy, theology, journalism, and mass communication, studying in India and England before continuing graduate work in the United States. He received a master's degree in journalism and a Ph.D. in mass communications from Syracuse University's S. I. Newhouse School of Public Communications.

== Career ==
=== Chaplaincy and student ministry ===
After arriving at Syracuse University in the mid-1960s, Koshy began outreach to international students that later developed into organized ministry efforts. Syracuse University sources credit him with helping initiate traditions of hospitality toward international students, including the university's International Thanksgiving Celebration, which began in the 1980s and continued after his death through the Evangelical Christian chaplaincy at Hendricks Chapel.

He served as evangelical chaplain at Syracuse University for approximately four decades.

=== Organizations and pastoral work ===
Koshy founded International Friendship Evangelism (IFE), an organization focused on friendship and hospitality-based ministry among international students and visitors in the Syracuse area. He also served as founder and senior pastor of International Assembly, a non-denominational congregation associated with his outreach to international students.

Some biographies also describe him as a "pastor-at-large" connected with The Joshua Fund and as having a wider international ministry network.

=== Writing ===
Koshy authored a biography of Indian evangelist Bakht Singh, published as Bakht Singh of India: The Incredible Account of a Modern-Day Apostle. In 2012, he co-authored The Invested Life with Joel C. Rosenberg, a book focused on Christian discipleship and mentorship.

== Death ==
Koshy died in Syracuse, New York, on August 28, 2012, at age 78.

== Selected works ==
- Bakht Singh of India: The Incredible Account of a Modern-Day Apostle (2008)
- The Invested Life: Making Disciples of All Nations One Person at a Time (with Joel C. Rosenberg, 2012)
