= Open Brethren =

Evangelical Christian churches

Open Brethren (Christian Brethren)
- Classification: Protestant
- Orientation: Plymouth Brethren
- Polity: Congregationalist
- Region: c. 130 countries
- Founder: George Müller and others
- Origin: 1848; Bristol, England
- Separated from: Plymouth Brethren (N.B. The Open Brethren and the Exclusive Brethren, which emerged from the schism, dispute which party was responsible for it)
- Separations: Needed Truth Brethren, 1892
- Congregations: 25,000
- Members: 2 million est.

The Open Brethren are a branch of the Plymouth Brethren tradition of evangelical Christianity. The Open Brethren originated in Ireland and in the British Isles; today they have an estimated 26,000 assemblies worldwide.

The Open Brethren form independent, autonomous assemblies and the name "Open" is given to them to distinguish them from "Exclusive Brethren", with whom they share historic roots. The division of the Plymouth Brethren into the Open Brethren and the Exclusive Brethren took place in 1848. Open Brethren are also commonly known as "Plymouth Brethren", especially in North America. Many Open Brethren outside North America, however, less frequently use the "Plymouth Brethren" designation to avoid confusion with the related Exclusive Brethren, particularly the Plymouth Brethren Christian Church, which is known for its rigid interpretation of the doctrine of nonconformity to the world.

The Brethren are committed to missionary work and they also hold the view that the Bible is the first authority in matters of faith and practice. Each assembly (or congregation) is independent of the others in doctrinal matters, yet there is a high degree of communication and cooperation among those who share a similar doctrine and practice. Open Brethren assemblies form a continuum, from tight gatherings that extend fellowship only to those who have first left other denominations, to very loose gatherings that receive into fellowship any stranger without question. A number of the Plymouth Brethren practices are recorded in the text Gathering Unto His Name (1997), authored by Norman W. Crawford.

A building associated with a group of Open Brethren is usually called a "Gospel Chapel", "Gospel Hall", "Bible Chapel", "Christian Assembly" or other similar term, not "church." A sub-set of the Open Brethren are the Gospel Hall Assemblies, who tend to be more conservative than their fellow Brethren in their practices. Theologically, however, they differ very little.

== History ==
The separation of the independent or open brethren from the Exclusive Brethren occurred when John Nelson Darby denounced Benjamin Wills Newton, an elder of the Plymouth assembly, at that time the largest of the Brethren assemblies, over disagreements concerning prophecy and church organisation. Darby forced him to admit to theological errors, then attacked George Müller and Henry Craik at Bethesda Chapel in Bristol for accepting two others of that assembly, even though they were not implicated in any of Newton's errors.

This led to a separation of Bethesda from Darby and a clear adoption of an independent or congregational stance by many of the assemblies. The statement of the assembly at Tottenham gives clearly the position of the Open Brethren:

We welcome to the table, on individual grounds, each saint, not because he or she is a member of this or that gathering or denomination of Christians nor because they are followers of any particular leader, but on such testimony as commends itself to us as being sufficient. We distinctly refuse to be parties to any exclusion of those who, we are satisfied, are believers—except on grounds personally applying to their individual faith and conduct.

The exclusive Darbyites "became more and more introverted and mystical as the years passed", while the open brethren continued to develop an emphasis on the "faith missions" pioneered by Anthony Norris Groves in India and George Müller with his orphanages in Bristol. In 1853, they started their first missionary journal, The Missionary Reporter. In 1859, the religious revival which reached Britain had a transforming effect on many of the assemblies and brought in new leaders such as Joseph Denham Smith. Ulster became one of the stronger centres, and expansion occurred in Scotland and northern England. In London, Thomas John Barnardo began his rescue work with orphans. Dwight L. Moody from Chicago, on a trip to England to visit George Müller and Charles H. Spurgeon, met a young man in a Dublin assembly, Henry Moorhouse, who was to profoundly influence his preaching style when he preached at Moody's church, revolutionising his work as an evangelist.

In Barnstaple, one of the largest early brethren assemblies developed from the inspiring example of Robert Cleaver Chapman, who continued his ministry until the end of the century. He had made an evangelistic tour of Spain in 1838 and after 1869 the work expanded in Barcelona and Madrid and also in Portugal. In Italy, an indigenous development by Count Guicciardini linked up with T. P. Rossetti (a cousin of Dante Gabriel Rossetti) in England although the Protestant "Brethren" faced persecution and imprisonment by the Catholic church.

The movement soon spread with English-speaking emigrants to Australia and New Zealand as well as to the United States and Canada. Some 600 congregations were recorded in 1959 in the U.S. and 300 in Canada.

=== Increasing diversity ===
By the middle of the twentieth century, a number of streams were becoming apparent within the Open Brethren, especially in North America. A clear line of demarcation (albeit with some overlap) appeared between more conservative assemblies, generally known as Gospel Halls, and the more "progressive" Bible Chapels, with the latter being more receptive to innovations like accompanied music and collaboration with non-Brethren Christians. Robert McClurkin was welcome in both circles, but he complained that the Gospel Halls were being influenced by literature from the very strict Needed Truth movement (an 1892 schism from the Open Brethren), and that a rigid line of demarcation was being drawn. This line was far less pronounced outside of North America, however.

In the second half of the twentieth century, the Brethren movement diversified further still, especially through cultural adaptations in Third World countries. Examples of this include some assemblies in Papua New Guinea, which began using coconut flesh and milk instead of bread and wine to celebrate Holy Communion (or "the Lord's Supper", as many Brethren prefer to call it). In France, Brethren have established a central committee offering leadership and direction to assemblies that choose to participate, despite the common Brethren aversion to central organisations, while Brethren in Ethiopia have leadership conferences at which some collective decision-making takes place. In Germany, many Brethren assemblies have joined Wiedenest, a joint Brethren–Baptist venture which operates a seminary, conference centre, youth movement, and missionary organisation. In predominantly Muslim Pakistan, some assemblies seat men and women on opposite sides of the room, as in a mosque. When they pray, they do so on their knees.

International Brethren Conferences on Mission (IBCM) were founded in 1993 in Singapore by unions of churches from various countries.

== Statistics ==
According to an IBCM Network census released in 2020, they claimed 40,000 churches and 2,700,000 members in 155 countries.

== Characteristics ==
In Open Brethren meetings, each local assembly is independent and autonomous, so the characteristics of each may differ to a greater or lesser degree, which makes it difficult to generalise when describing distinctive characteristics. They have no central hierarchy to dictate a statement of faith, and even local assemblies have traditionally been reluctant to adhere to any of the historic "Creeds" and "Confessions of Faith" found in many Protestant denominations. This is not because they are opposed to the central sentiments and doctrines expressed in such formulations, but rather because they hold the Bible as their sole authority in regard to matters of doctrine and practice. In the last two decades, however, some Brethren assemblies have adopted statements of faith, generally emphasising fundamentalist doctrines. Like many non-conformist churches, Brethren observe only the two ordinances of Baptism and Communion.

In many countries, the terms conservative and progressive are informally used to describe the character of particular Brethren assemblies. Congregations calling themselves "Gospel Chapels", and even more so "Gospel Halls", are often described as "conservative" and tend to put more emphasis on distinctive Brethren doctrines and features. Congregations calling themselves "Community Churches" or "Evangelical Churches" are often described as "progressive"; these tend to put less emphasis (and in some cases, no emphasis) on Brethren distinctives. When assemblies known as "Bible Chapels" first became common in the 1950s, they were considered very progressive compared to other assemblies of that time; today, some of them are still considered progressive, but others are now considered to be somewhat conservative by today's standards. Congregations calling themselves "churches" are almost invariably at the progressive end of the Brethren spectrum. The "conservative" and "progressive" labels, in general, refer to differences in style, not doctrine: few assemblies, if any, have moved away from Evangelical theology.

The most notable differences between Brethren and other Christian groups lie in a number of doctrinal beliefs that affect the practice of their gatherings and behaviour. These beliefs and practices can be summarised as follows:

=== Theology ===
The Open Brethren are generally dispensational, pre-tribulational, and premillennial in their theology (although there are many variations) and they have much in common with other conservative evangelical Christian groups. Most of them teach the "eternal security" of the true Christian, with each believer being subject to "grace" and not "law".

==== Justification by faith ====
Justification by faith alone (sola fide) states that it is by grace through faith alone that Christians receive salvation and not through any works of their own (see Ephesians 2:8, Romans 3:23). Open Brethren have a strong emphasis on the concept of salvation. The brethren teach that the consequence of human sin is condemnation to eternal death in hell. Christ's death on the cross paid sin's penalty and his resurrection is evidence that eternal life is available to any who will have it. The only requirements are that each individual accepts the substitutionary payment of his own sin by faith in Christ's death.

==== Believer's baptism ====
The Open Brethren teach that baptism plays no role in salvation, and is properly performed only after a person professes Jesus Christ as Saviour. Baptism is an outward expression that symbolises the inward cleansing or remission of a person's sins which has already taken place at salvation. Baptism is also a public identification of that person with Jesus Christ. In many assemblies, an individual is considered a member of that assembly once he or she is baptised.

In other assemblies, however, an individual (after baptism) must show a commitment to a particular assembly by faithful attendance to as many assembly meetings as possible. In such assemblies, it is usually the recently baptised individual who will request fellowship, but not always, as any concerned assembly member may contact the individual to determine their intentions with regard to assembly fellowship. Once it is shown that the individual desires acceptance into assembly fellowship, that desire is then communicated to the gathered assembly so that all members may have opportunity to express any concerns regarding the applicant. Once the applicant meets with the approval of the assembly members, an announcement is made to the gathered assembly that the applicant will be received into full assembly fellowship, which would be the first Sunday (Lord's Day) following the announcement.

Open Brethren emphasise baptism by full immersion. This mode is preferred for its parallel imagery to the death, burial and resurrection of Christ. Immersion baptism is also seen as a practice established by the baptism of Jesus Christ by John the Baptist and is therefore Biblically based. Baptism may occur in any body of water that will allow full immersion, though many Brethren assembly halls will have a baptistry. Baptismal services are celebratory and are often linked to an evangelistic meeting.

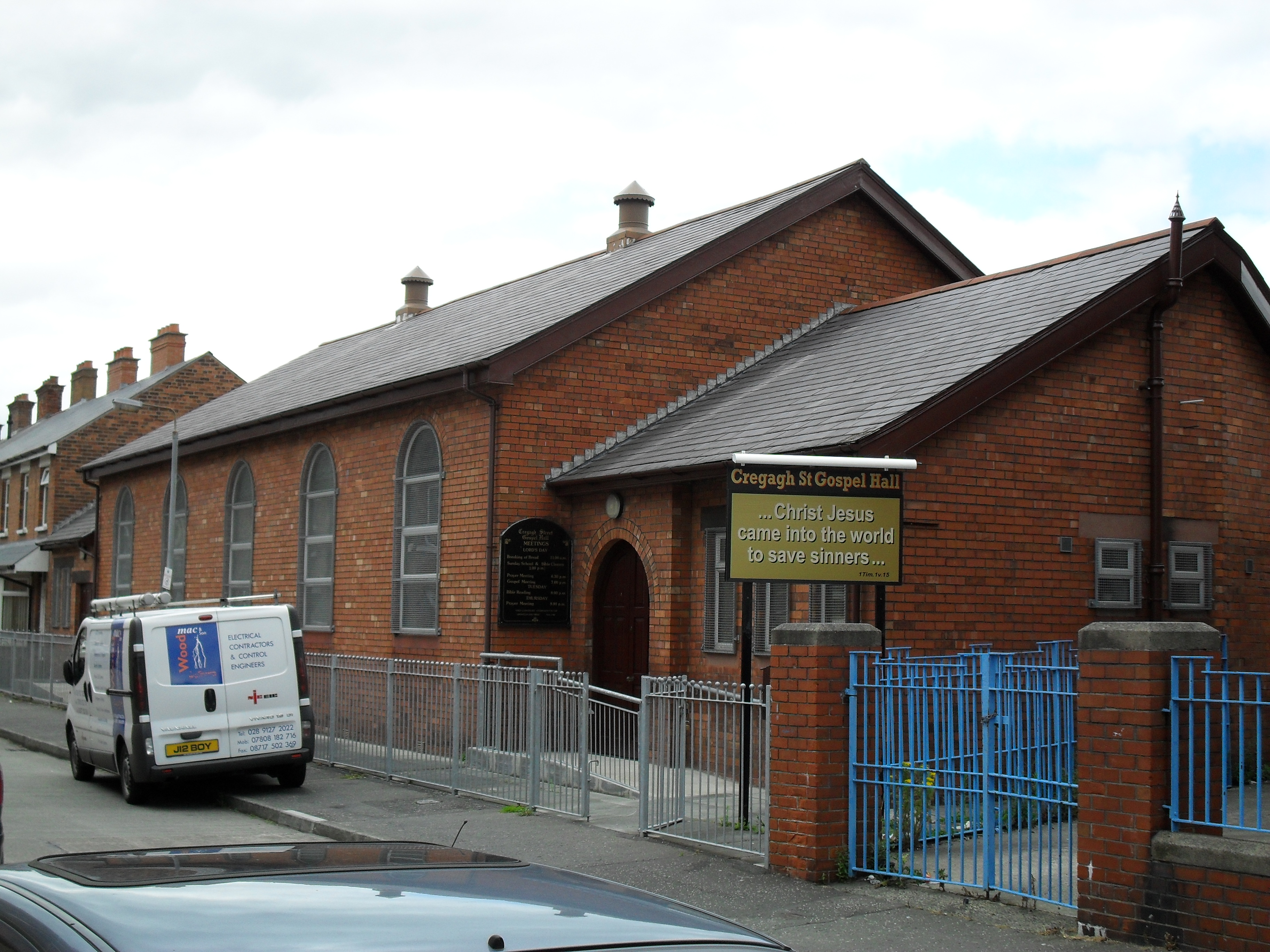
Cregagh Street Gospel Hall, Belfast

==== Dispensationalism ====
Most Brethren have always considered what many call Dispensationalism to be the proper interpretation of what the apostles taught. Many of them believe that Brethren pioneer John Nelson Darby was the first in modern times to "rediscover" this "forgotten" teaching of the apostles. A number of influential non-Brethren Evangelical leaders were influenced by Darby's teaching, men such as D. L. Moody and, indirectly, C. I. Scofield, who popularized this view through his Scofield Reference Bible. In essence, Dispensationalism as taught by the Brethren sees a clear distinction between "law" and "grace", Israel and the Church. It also holds that the Church, consisting of all genuine NT believers, will be raptured when the Lord returns in the clouds, not to the earth, with the spirits of the NT believers who had previously died. At this time the bodies of the living believers will be transformed and the bodies of the NT believers who had previously died will be resurrected and united with their spirits. This will be followed by a seven-year Great Tribulation during which God will turn his attention back to the Jews, who will ultimately recognize The Lord Jesus Christ as their Messiah, thus triggering his return to the earth to save them from annihilation. This period will be followed by a thousand-year Millennium during which The Lord Jesus Christ will reign as King of Kings and Lord of Lords.

Although generally held by most Brethren, both historical and contemporary, there have always been some Brethren who rejected Dispensationalism. George Müller and G. H. Lang were among the prominent Brethren leaders who never accepted this doctrine, and non-Dispensationalism has always been followed by a significant minority of Open Brethren in the United Kingdom. Until much more recently, however, Dispensationalism was much more universally held among Brethren outside of the United Kingdom.

==== Eternal security ====
Most of the Brethren pioneers such as Groves, Darby and Muller were convinced Calvinists. By the 1930s, however, a strong Arminian strain developed in many parts of the Brethren movement, especially in North America. Today, it is common to find Brethren advocates for both theological systems, with the caveat that even those who embrace Arminianism in the main will still generally hold to the fifth point of Calvinism, which Brethren call the eternal security of the believer—the doctrine that it is impossible for a true Christian to lose his or her salvation. Even today, it is rare to find a Brethren preacher or an official Brethren publication questioning this doctrine.

==== Gifts of the Holy Spirit ====
Although some of the early Brethren pioneers were initially interested in the miraculous gifts of the Holy Spirit such as miracles, healing and speaking in tongues that were being practised by the Catholic Apostolic Church of Edward Irving, with whom many of the early Brethren were acquainted, they soon adopted a Cessationist position, which was to remain the prevailing Brethren view for the best part of two centuries. Cessationism holds that the sign gifts were given to the early Church only, for the specific purpose of authenticating the Apostles, and "ceased" with the death of the last Apostle, usually believed to be John, around the end of the first century.

Until very recent times, this doctrine was the nearly unanimous view of Brethren preachers and Brethren institutions (publications, Bible colleges, and missions agencies). A few prominent Brethren did question it: G. H. Lang expressed doubts about it in the 1920s, and Harry Ironside, perhaps the most influential Brethren preacher who ever lived, rejected it in principle in 1938. Although he condemned Pentecostalism, the "package" in which the sign gifts were most often seen, he nevertheless said that he did not believe that the age of miracles had ceased. Most Brethren preachers, however, remained unwilling to compromise on this stance. Although Brethren theologian Ernest Tatham published a book, Let the tide come in! in 1976, saying that he had been mistaken in his previous support for Cessationism, most Brethren remained opposed to the Charismatic movement. A handful of Brethren assemblies around the world did begin to embrace the Charismatic movement in the late 1970s and early 1980s, but it remained very much a fringe element among Brethren until the early 2000s.

Today, Brethren attitudes to the "sign gifts" are much more diverse than in the past. In the early 2000s, Dutch theologian Willem Ouweneel became one of the first high-profile Brethren leaders to publicly endorse the charismatic movement without leaving the Brethren. A significant minority of Open Brethren assemblies in New Zealand, along with some in Australia, Canada and the United Kingdom, have embraced the Charismatic movement over the past fifteen years, and many more now describe themselves as cautiously receptive to it. Other assemblies, however, have responded by formalising their commitment to Cessationism. Despite the traditional Brethren aversion to having written statements of faith, some assemblies have recently adopted a statement of faith denying the continuity of the sign gifts. In India, too, some Brethren assemblies have embraced the Charismatic movement, but most prominent Indian Brethren preachers, such as Johnson Philip, principal of Brethren Theological College in Kerala, remain opposed.

=== Simplicity in worship and symbolism ===
Brethren churches have traditionally avoided crosses displayed inside or outside their place of worship. As the focus is on Christ and the Word of God. they typically view an unembellished room as more effective. Similarly, crosses are not typically placed inside homes or worn around the neck by these believers. Other symbols such as stained glass windows for their normal meeting hall have also been traditionally discouraged. In the past two decades, however, some of the more "progressive" assemblies have abandoned this traditional stance.

Meetings do not usually follow a set liturgy. Liturgical calendars of "High Church" groups, such as the Anglican or Lutheran churches, are almost universally avoided. Traditionally, many Brethren groups did not celebrate Christmas or Easter, arguing that there is no Biblical command to do so. There are still some assemblies that take this stance, but many Brethren churches today do celebrate these festivals, and sometimes use them as an occasion to evangelise in the community.

=== Naming conventions ===
Until recently, Brethren churches have rarely used the word "Church" as part of their name. Open Brethren groups usually called their places of worship "Gospel Halls" or "Gospel Chapels", with the latter generally being somewhat less sectarian (i.e., more open to cooperating with non-Brethren Christians) than the former. A third group, called "Bible Chapels", became widespread in North America and Oceania from the 1950s onwards. Bible Chapels are often more willing to use musical accompaniment in worship and are generally very willing to cooperate with other Christians who share their Evangelical beliefs. In recent years, many of the more progressive assemblies have moved away from their previous aversion to the word "church" and may now be called "Community Church" (especially in Canada, Australia, or New Zealand), or "Evangelical Church" (in the United Kingdom). These distinctions are purely descriptive; they (generally) denote differences in worship and administrative style, not affiliation.

Some Brethren churches have Bible names, e.g., "Ebenezer Gospel Hall", "Hebron Chapel", "Shiloh Bible Chapel" and "Bethel Assembly"; sometimes they are named after the street on which they are found, e.g. Curzon Street Gospel Hall, Derby; sometimes after the locality, e.g. Ballynagarrick Gospel Hall. Some assemblies at the progressive end of the Brethren spectrum have names like "Life Church, Manurewa", or "Street City Church, Wellington".

In most parts of the world, the "Brethren" label is rarely used as part of the name of a local congregation. A notable exception is India, many of whose local assemblies do use it as part of their name, e.g. Ebenezer Brethren Assembly.

=== Fellowship, not membership ===
Open Brethren assemblies have traditionally rejected the concept of anyone "joining" as a member of a particular local gathering of believers and the maintenance of any list of such members. Brethren emphasise the Christian doctrine of the one "Church" made up of all true believers and enumerated in Heaven in "Lamb's Book of Life", rather than by humans. However, as a practical matter, in the late twentieth century many American assemblies began maintaining lists of those in regular attendance at meetings. This was often to comply with secular governance issues or to offer a directory of attendees for internal use. The Open Brethren emphasise that meeting attendance for the nonbeliever has no direct spiritual benefit (though it is hoped the individual may be influenced to convert). Nonbelievers are not to partake of the "Breaking of Bread", though this proves generally difficult to enforce in larger assemblies. Regardless, regular attendance for believers is felt to be an act of obedience to the New Testament command that they should not neglect the assembling of themselves together. Despite the Brethren's rejection of the term 'member', many observers use the term to refer to those who attend meetings. Visiting brethren have traditionally been expected to bring a "letter of commendation" from their "home assembly", assuring the group they are visiting that they are in fellowship and not under any form of discipline. This practice is somewhat less common today than in years past, however.

=== Leadership ===
While much of typical Brethren theology closely parallels non-Calvinist English and American Baptist traditions on many points, the view on clergy is much closer to the Quakers in rejecting the idea of clergy. Many Protestant denominations claim adherence to the New Testament doctrine of the priesthood of all believers to varying extents. One of the most defining elements of the Brethren is the rejection of the concept of clergy. Rather, in keeping with the doctrine of the Priesthood of all believers, they view all Christians as being ordained by God to serve and are therefore ministers. The Brethren embrace the most extensive form of that idea in that there is no ordained or unordained person or group employed to function as minister(s) or pastor(s).

==== Pastors and itinerant preachers ====
Brethren assemblies are led by the local church elders within any fellowship and historically there is no office of "senior pastor" in most Brethren churches, because they believe such an office does not exist in the New Testament. The English word in its plural form, "pastors", is found only once in many English versions of the New Testament, being a translation of the original Koine Greek word poimenas as found in Ephesians 4:11. Therefore, there is no formal ordination process for those who preach, teach, or lead, within their meetings. In place of an ordained ministry, an itinerant preacher often receives a "commendation" to the work of preaching and/or teaching that demonstrates the blessing and support of the assembly of origin. In most English-speaking countries, such preachers have traditionally been called "full time workers", "labouring brothers", or "on the Lord's work"; in India, they are usually called Evangelists and very often are identified with Evg. in front of their name. A given assembly may have any number of full-time workers, or none at all.

In the last twenty years, many assemblies in Australia and New Zealand, and some elsewhere, have broken with tradition and have begun calling their full-time workers "Pastors", but this is not seen as ordaining clergy and does not connote a transfer of any special spiritual authority. In such assemblies, the Pastor is simply one of several elders, and differs from his fellow-elders only in being salaried to serve full-time. Depending on the assembly, he may, or may not, take a larger share of the responsibility for preaching than his fellow-elders.

==== Elders ====
The Open Brethren believe in a plurality of elders (Acts 14:23; 15:6,23; 20:17; Philippians 1:1)—men meeting the Biblical qualifications found in 1 Timothy 3:1–7 and Titus 1:6–9. This position is also taken in some Baptist churches, especially Reformed Baptists, by the Churches of Christ, and increasingly by independent non-denominational evangelical churches. It is understood that elders are appointed by the Holy Spirit (Acts 20:28) and are recognised as meeting the qualifications by the assembly and by previously existing elders, whereas some believe in the time of the establishment of the first New Testament assemblies it was either an apostle's duty or his directly appointed delegate's responsibility to ordain elders (for example, Timothy or Titus), this original order being consistent with the Christian concept that authority comes from above and does not arise from men.

Men who become elders, or those who become deacons and overseers within the fellowship, are ones who have been recognised by others within the individual assemblies and have been given the blessing of performing leadership tasks by the elders. An elder should be able and ready to teach when his assembly sees the "call of God" on his life to assume the office of elder (1 Timothy 3:2). Brethren elders conduct many other duties that would be typically performed by "the clergy" in other Christian groups, including: counselling those who have decided to be baptised, performing baptisms, visiting the sick and giving spiritual counsel in general. Normally, sermons are given by either the elders or men who regularly attend the Sunday meetings; but, again, only men whom the elders recognise have the "call of God" on their lives. Visiting speakers, however, are usually paid their travel costs and provided for with Sunday meals following the meetings.

==== Deacons ====
The main role of the "deacon" is to assist the elders with members' needs. Deacons are usually chosen from members who have demonstrated exceptional Christian piety. (see 1 Timothy 3:8–12). However, in many meetings there is no official list of deacons, diaconal work being shared by anyone willing to give a helping hand in a particular task.

Brethren groups generally recognise from the teachings of the Apostle Paul's epistles that not all the believers in any one fellowship are suited to give public ministry such as teaching and preaching.

=== Weekly "Remembrance" meeting ===
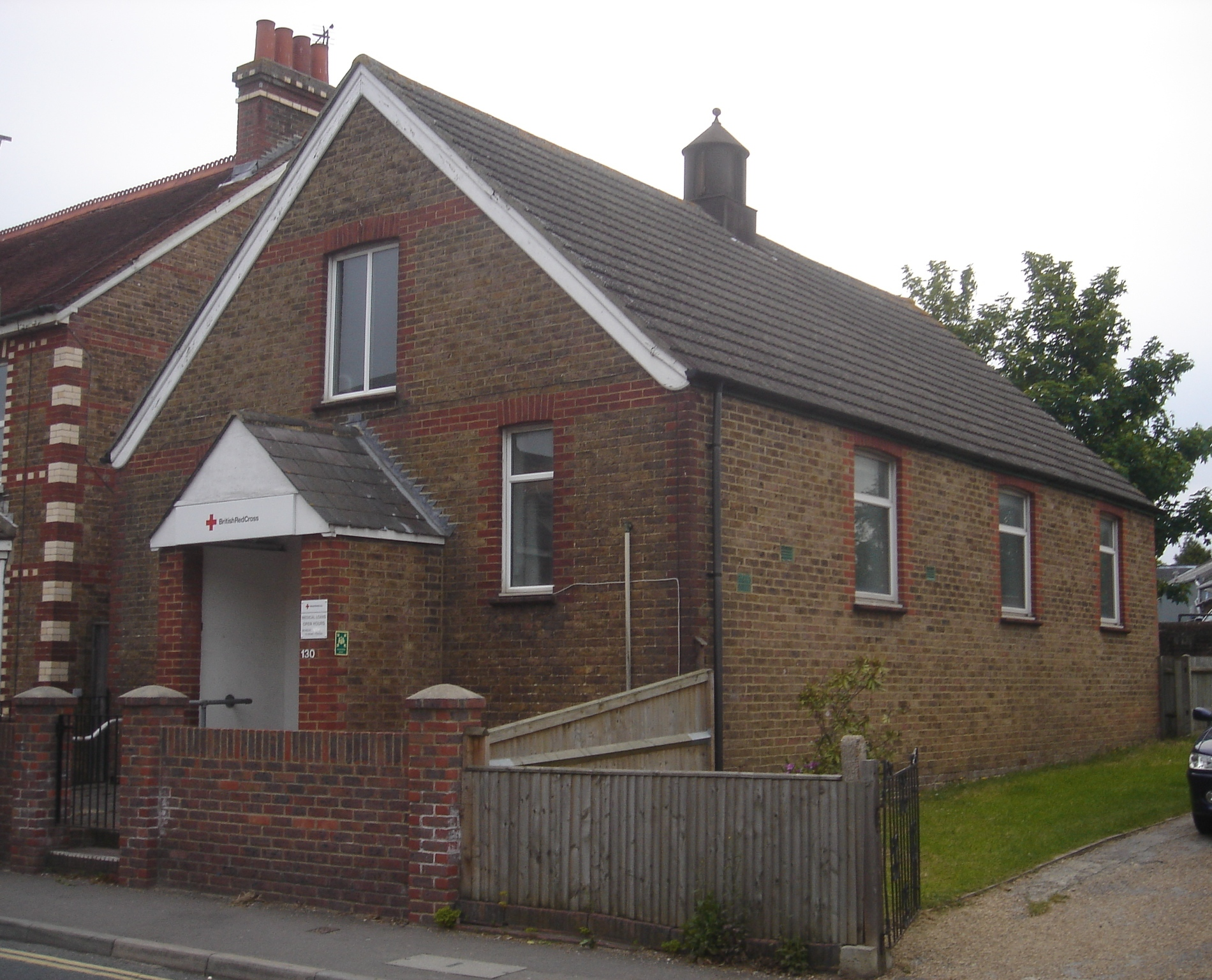
Former Brethren Meeting House, Burgess Hill

A distinctive practice of the Brethren is a separate weekly Communion meeting, referred to as the "Breaking of Bread" or "The Lord's Supper". Although specific practices will vary from meeting to meeting, there are general similarities.

- The "Remembrance Meeting" is usually held each Sunday morning (though some assemblies hold it in the evening).
- Where a meeting hall allows for the adjustment of furniture, the table bearing the communion "emblems" (bread and wine or grape juice) is sometimes placed in the centre of the room. Chairs may be arranged around the table in four radiating sections, all facing the table, although this is not a recognised standard.
- There is no order or plan for the meeting: rather the meeting is extempore; men (see Separate roles of men and women) will (as "led by the Spirit") rise and read or quote Scripture, pray, request a hymn to be sung or give a Christ-centred thought.
- Many of the more conservative assemblies do not have instrumental accompaniment to hymns and songs sung during the "Remembrance Meeting" but instead have men who "start the hymns" (choosing a tune, tempo, pitch and key and singing the first few words, with the rest joining in shortly thereafter). In some groups, musical accompaniment may be used at the other meetings (i.e., gatherings). Here is an Acapella example sung from Hymns of the Little Flock at Preston Gospel Chapel recorded in 2017. Assemblies calling themselves "Bible Chapels", on the other hand, are much more likely to have musical accompaniment than those calling themselves "Gospel Halls". One notable feature of this time of worship is the use of a select few collections of hymns. Some examples of this are Hymns of the Little Flock and Hymns of Worship and Remembrance (affectionately known as "The Black Book").
- Either at the beginning or toward the end of the "Remembrance Meeting" gathering, a prayer is said in reference to the bread concerning its portrayal as "the body of Christ", perhaps by an individual so appointed or (in a meeting where no one is appointed) by a man who has taken it upon himself.
- Generally a loaf of leavened bread is used as an emblem of Christ's body – though many assemblies use unleavened bread or matzos. After giving thanks for the loaf, it is broken and circulated to the quiet, seated congregation. Congregants will break off small pieces, or take small pieces of broken unleavened bread, as it is passed, and eat them individually (i.e. not waiting for a group invitation to consume it together). At this time, the worshiper usually engages in silent prayerful worship of the Lord Jesus Christ.
- As with common Christian practice, wine has been traditionally used at Brethren Remembrance Meetings as the emblem of Christ's blood. Some individual meetings use grape juice, especially if someone in fellowship has had an alcohol problem in the past. The emblem of the blood is served after the bread has been circulated to the congregation and after it has been prayed over. In a similar fashion as each worshiper takes the "cup", so to speak, that individual again usually engages in silent prayerful worship of the Lord Jesus Christ.
- Most assemblies do not take an offering during the time their Sunday sermons are preached; but some, not all, do take an offering at the Breaking of Bread meetings. Only those in fellowship are expected to give. Many assemblies see tithing (the giving of 10 percent of one's income) as a commandment for Israel from the Old Testament law and not binding on Christians, although some assemblies do encourage tithing. Instead, the amount given is normally left to the giver and is a private matter between the individual and the Lord.

One reason for not taking up an offering at all meetings is to avoid causing any unbelievers who may be present to think that they might gain a spiritual benefit by making a donation. Some assemblies never send an offering bag round the congregation, even at the Breaking of Bread meeting. They prefer to simply have a box or two located at the back of the meeting hall, thus avoiding even the appearance of solicitation for funds. Many assemblies operate a "back seat" or "guest row" during the Breaking of Bread so that neither the offering bag nor the emblems of bread and wine will pass down the row of those not in fellowship. An offering bag, basket or box may be sent around after these two "emblems" have been passed, collecting money given voluntarily for use in maintaining the building, hall or room, to remunerate full-time or labouring members, or for distribution to the needy. In some cases an offering box may be placed at the door and not circulated.

- Because some assemblies do not encourage strangers to take Communion, it is common for those who are travelling to take with them a "letter of introduction" so they might be permitted to take Communion away from their home assemblies. These letters are typically read aloud to those present at the "Remembrance Meeting" and serve the purpose of introducing visitors to the meetings so that they can be made welcome and benefit from fellowship. These Open Brethren meetings operate what is termed a "Closed Table Policy". Any stranger arriving at such a meeting without a letter is allowed only to observe the meeting.

On the other hand, many of the more progressive assemblies welcome any who profess Jesus Christ as the Saviour and who give evidence of such after simple questioning by either one or more of the assembly elders or one or more of those ushering at that particular meeting. At some assemblies, a pamphlet explaining the Scriptural basis and purpose of the Lord's Supper is handed to visitors before they enter the main meeting room where the assembly is gathered preparing themselves for worship. This pamphlet explains to the visitor what they are about to witness and perhaps, if they so choose, be a participant in.

=== Other Sunday meetings ===
Following the Remembrance meeting there may be one other Sunday meeting, or perhaps more. Whereas the purpose of the Lord's Supper is predominantly for worship, recalling the person and work of Christ, other meetings involve Bible teaching, evangelism and gospel preaching (among young and old). Sunday Schools and Bible classes are common. In ministry and Gospel meetings the congregation, seated in rows facing a pulpit or platform, sing hymns and choruses and listen to Scripture readings and a sermon preached by one of the brethren called to "preach". Bible teaching may be given either in the form of a ministry meeting in which a sermon is delivered or in a "Bible reading" or "Bible study" in which the men discuss a portion of Scripture.

=== Separate roles of men and women ===
No distinction is made in Brethren teaching between men and women in their individual relation to Christ and his "vicarious atonement" for them on the cross, or their individual position before God as believers. However, in most Brethren meetings the principle of "male headship" is applied in accordance with teaching found in several passages in the Bible, including 1 Corinthians 11:3, which says:

But I would have you know, that the head of every man is Christ; and the head of the woman is the man; and the head of Christ is God.

1 The Head of every man is Christ—no equality. 2 The head of the woman is the man—equality and subjection. 3 The Head of Christ is God—equality, yet subjection.

Thus most Brethren meetings reserve public leadership and teaching roles to men, based on 1 Timothy 2:11,12 ... :

A woman should learn in quietness and full submission. I do not permit a woman to teach or to have authority over a man; she must be silent.

Also, 1 Corinthians 14:34,35 states,

Let your women keep silence in the churches: for it is not permitted unto them to speak; but they are commanded to be under obedience, as also saith the law. And if they will learn any thing, let them ask their husbands at home: for it is a shame for women to speak in the church. (The reason for this has to do with acknowledging Headship: Headship and the head covering are seen by many as inseparable since the head covering is intended to teach the meaning of headship. See below for information on the head covering).

From this, Brethren teaching traditionally (though with regional exceptions) outlines a system in which the men take the "vocal" and leadership roles and the women take supportive and "silent" roles. Traditionally, women have not usually been permitted to participate in individual speech during the "Breaking of Bread" meeting. In most Brethren groups women would be heard to sing the hymns along with the group, but their voices would not otherwise be heard during the meeting. Often the men are, practically speaking, the only ones involved fully and vocally in all discussions leading up to administrative decision making as well. There were some local exceptions in the past, with some women preaching in Brethren circles in the United Kingdom in the 1860s and 1870s, but these events were isolated and short-lived. A number of assemblies in the south of England, under the influence of G. H. Lang, permitted women to participate audibly in worship (but not to preach) as far back as the 1930s, and a large network of assemblies in India, connected with the ministry of Bakht Singh, did the same from the 1950s onward. But these innovations had little impact beyond their immediate geographical areas. In the last two decades, however, a large number of assemblies in the United Kingdom, Australia, and New Zealand, as well as some in North America, have modified or abandoned this rule. Other assemblies, however, have reacted by placing more emphasis on this traditional teaching and by formalising what was previously an unwritten rule.

==== The head covering ====
As to the reason behind women covering their heads at meetings in traditional Open Brethren services, 1 Corinthians 11:5–6 says:

But every woman that prays or prophesies with her head uncovered dishonours her head: for that is even all one as if she were shaven. For if the woman is not covered, let her also be shorn: but if it is a shame for a woman to be shorn or shaven, let her be covered.

Open Brethren traditionally interpret this verse to mean that during prayer, a Christian women is supposed to have her head covered; this has been the historic practice in all of Christendom. For this reason, Brethren meetings will be characterised by the women wearing head coverings ("loaners" in some assemblies are available at the back for women who have come without a covering). Head coverings typically take the form of a hanging veil, mantilla, shawl, tam, beret or other headcovering.

While that is an overly simplified view of the head covering, the traditional Brethren understanding of the purpose for the head covering comes from their interpretation of 1 Corinthians 11:3&4, which says:

^{3}But I would have you know, that the head of every man is Christ; and the head of the woman is the man; and the head of Christ is God. ^{4} Every man praying or prophesying, having his head covered, dishonours his head.

Here is the "picture" that the head covering is understood to display: the Head of the man is Christ, so the man's physical head needs to be uncovered to honour his Head, Christ. The head of the woman is the man, so the woman's physical head must be covered, men are not on display in the church. The woman's head covering and silence in the church shows that the men participating are not on display but rather that Christ is on display.

This practice is not as widely held by Brethren as it once was. Many assemblies throughout the world have developed to leave questions of head coverings, levels of female participation and responsibility to the discretion of the individual. But there are still some Brethren assemblies that seek to be completely untouched by changing attitudes within society regarding the role of women. They view the abandonment of the traditionally practised doctrine of Headship as evidence of an overall apostasy (or moral deterioration) within Christendom and as leading to disorder and eventual anarchy within their fellowships.

== Other practices ==
=== Gatherings and meetings ===
Assemblies prefer to use the term "meeting" to describe their gatherings rather than "service". The term "service", to some, is normally associated with a service or something which is offered for a fee. Assemblies might also have weekly meetings which might include: preaching/teaching meetings, missionary reports, Bible studies and prayer meetings. There is frequently a Sunday School for children and youth groups for teens. There may also be women's meetings, men's meetings, and, in some assemblies, specialized arts and crafts groups which are used as a form of evangelistic outreach to the community.

=== Music ===
During the weekly Breaking of Bread meeting, hymns were traditionally sung unaccompanied by any musical instrument, though many of the more progressive assemblies today have instrumental accompaniment. In some assemblies, hymns sung during the other types of meetings are accompanied by piano or electronic organ, though this practice varies among assemblies. Other musical instruments are used at some assemblies. Some assemblies blend traditional hymns with contemporary "Praise & Worship" music accompanied by bands. The name used by the assembly often gives a rough (but not infallible) guide to the music used in worship. The "Gospel Halls" would generally not use musical instruments in their services, whereas some "Gospel Chapels" and most "Bible Chapels" do use them and may have singing groups, choirs, "worship teams" of musicians, etc. Assemblies calling themselves "Community Churches" or "Evangelical Churches" may also accept modern Christian music, with drums, guitars, and other instruments.

== Brethren worldwide ==
A number of factors make it very difficult to know how many Brethren there are today, and estimates vary from 1 million to as many as 2.5 million attenders in 25,000 congregations. The factors hampering the gathering of statistics include the general lack of formal organization, as well as ambiguity over just what churches and networks form part of the Brethren network. In Kerala, the Kerala Brethren was established through Anthony Norris Groves one of the founders of the Brethren Movement, who was also the brother in law of George Müller. There are a considerable number of independent evangelical churches in Australia and New Zealand, and some in the United Kingdom and Canada, that work closely with networks generally considered to be "Brethren", and there are also networks, such as the Assemblies Jehovah Shammah of India, which closely resemble the Brethren and are often counted by Open Brethren as part of their movement, but which are nevertheless historically distinct from it. There is no universally agreed criteria among Brethren to determine what assemblies and networks comprise part of Open Brethren movement, which partly explains the widely different statistics given. Most assemblies that regard themselves as Brethren will "recognize" similar assemblies which regard themselves as such, however. The largest numbers of Open Brethren are to be found in India (450,000 adults and children in 2,200 assemblies, not counting another 300,000 adults and children in the Assemblies Jehovah Shammah); there are also over 1,000 assemblies each in Angola, Zambia and Chad as well as the United Kingdom and the United States, 800 in Brazil and over 600 in Germany. Assemblies are found in over 70 countries. Piepkorn estimated the number of Open Brethren in North America in 1970 as 60,000 in 1,050 assemblies.

=== Mission work ===
Open Brethren are noted for their commitment to missionary work. In the earliest days of the Brethren movement, Anthony Norris Groves became one of the earliest "faith missionaries", travelling to Baghdad in 1829 to preach the gospel and the Bible without the aid of an established missionary society. Many later Brethren missionaries took the same stance, and included notable missionary pioneers such as George Müller (founder of orphanages in Bristol, England), Dan Crawford (Scottish missionary to central Africa), Charles Marsh (missionary to Lafayette, Algeria from 1925 to 1969), and Jim Elliot, Ed McCully and Pete Fleming (missionaries to Ecuador killed by members of the Huaorani tribe).

While the majority of Open Brethren missionaries do not belong to a missionary society, there are a number of supporting organisations that give help and advice for missionaries: in the UK, Echoes of Service magazine, Medical Missionary News and the Lord's Work Trust are notable organisations. Today, missionaries are found all over the world, with high concentrations in Zambia and Southern Africa, Brazil, India, Western Europe and South East Asia. Brethren missionaries are still active in many parts of the world (1,223 from England, North America and Australasia) and there are assemblies in Chile, Dominican Republic, Peru and South Africa, among others.

=== United Kingdom ===
Along with other evangelical churches in the United Kingdom, the Brethren have been declining in numbers since the 1950s, especially among the more conservative assemblies. Assemblies with more progressive approaches have grown, however. There has been a blurring of distinctions between some assemblies and other non-denominational and house church congregations.

=== Europe ===
Outside the British Isles, the brethren have a large presence in the Faroe Islands, forming the largest non-conformist group amongst a population that predominantly belongs to the Evangelical Lutheran Church of the Faroe Islands.

JN Darby's visits to Switzerland between 1835 and 1840 with critiques of Methodist perfectionism resulted in the establishment of meetings in Vevey in 1838 and Lausanne in 1840 drawn from some of the dissenting churches. Later he moved to France establishing outposts in the Montpellier region. During this time he was also translating the New Testament into French. "During the five years that followed Darby's arrival in Lausanne, his principles spread far and wide in French Switzerland, and obtained some successes in Berne and Bâle."

The next move came from a visit by George Müller to a Baptist church in Stuttgart in 1843 at the invitation of a lady who had visited him in Bristol. "One or two of the elders having determined to reject him, a meeting "for the breaking of bread" was started in his private room the same evening. Seventeen persons were present." In 1854, Darby visited Germany with meetings being set up at Elberfeld and Düsseldorf among others.

=== India ===
The expansion of the Plymouth Brethren outside of the British Isles started early, when Anthony Norris Groves left to become a missionary in 1829, first in Baghdad and then in India. Although his work as a dentist in the Godavari delta area of Andhra Pradesh and Tamil Nadu progressed slowly, it produced in time a flourishing movement of Indian Brethren with a particular emphasis in Kerala. According to Operation World, there are 135,000 adult believers in 1929 assemblies throughout India (449,550 if children are included). Internal Brethren sources say that the number of assemblies has increased to 2200 and the number of adult believers in fellowship to 200,000, since Operation World was published in 2010.

The Assemblies Jehovah Shammah movement, founded by the evangelist Bakht Singh, are organized largely on Brethren principles with adaptations to Indian culture. Despite some differences from the older Brethren movement that was the fruit of British missionary efforts (such as his encouragement for women to take part audibly in worship), many Indian and foreign Brethren "recognize" the Assemblies Jehovah Shammah as a subset of the Open Brethren movement, albeit one that developed independently. Operation World claims 910 Assemblies Jehovah Shammah with 310,000 affiliates, 95,000 of them adults.

==== Kerala Brethren ====
An important stream of the Open Brethren is the Kerala Brethren. Kerala is a small state in India, but has more than 600 Open or Plymouth Brethren Assemblies. Brethren members believe that these assemblies are the result of an independent movement of the Holy Spirit in India. Eventually the Plymouth Brethren and the Kerala Brethren recognized the similarities in both the movements and thus the Kerala Brethren came to be identified as a sub-set of the Open Brethren.

=== North America ===
Itinerant preachers carried both the open brethren to North America after the middle of the nineteenth century. Darby made a number of visits in the 1870s and his emphasis on prophecy was influential. The Brethren movement has spread throughout the United States and Canada through evangelistic endeavours, immigration from the UK and Commonwealth countries, and by attracting Christians from other backgrounds with its emphasis on Biblicism, centrality of the Lord's Supper and equality of all believers under Christ, as well as its avoidance of denominational governance. Open Brethren congregations in America often are barely distinguishable from other evangelical denominations on the outside and often engage in joint efforts with other Christians in their communities. On the other hand, some previously thriving Brethren assemblies have seen dwindling attendances in recent years due in part to the lack of strong denominational loyalties and cultural discomfort with some brethren practices, such as head covering for women and silence of women in preaching and teaching in main services. In America, the designation of the building in which Open Brethren assemblies meet most often include the word "Chapel" in their formal name, combined with a biblical place name or principle or otherwise a local geographic feature—for instance, Bethany Chapel, Central Gospel Chapel, Park Road Bible Chapel, Riverview Believers Chapel. But unlike many other Christian groups, the names of Christian saints, (e.g. Paul, Luke) are rarely or never used. Closed groups, however, avoid "taking a name" to their group. A Closed group building is referred to as a "Meeting Room" or "Gospel Hall", and the word "Chapel" is avoided.

=== Oceania ===
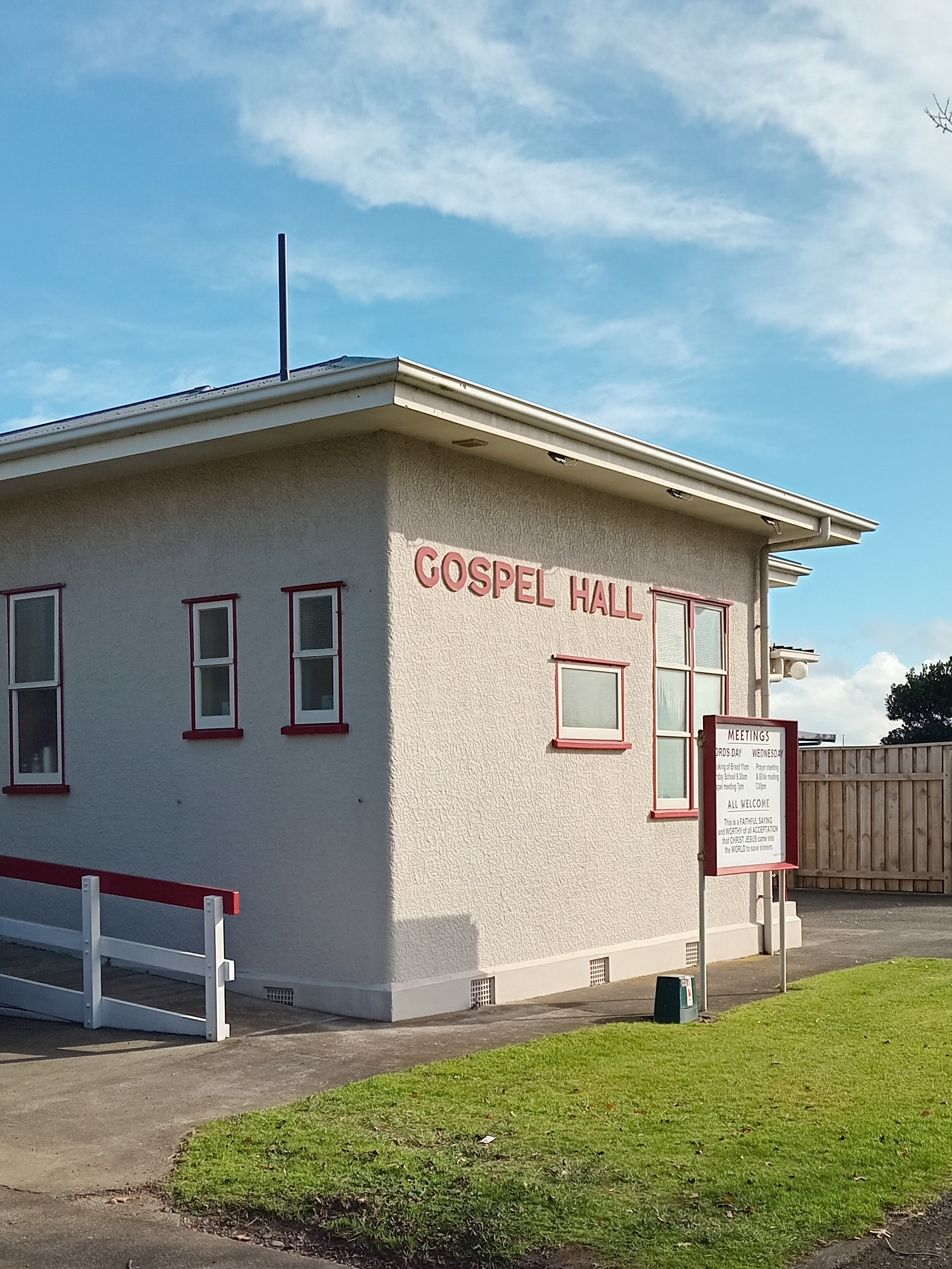
A Gospel Hall in Palmerston North, New Zealand

According to the Evangelical publication, Operation World, there are 320 Brethren congregations in Australia and 202 in New Zealand, with 46,176 affiliates in the former and 16,164 in the latter. Some Brethren sources claim the latter number to be underestimated, with internal sources indicating as many as 38,000 adults and children attending Brethren assemblies — almost one percent of New Zealand's population.

The Brethren in both countries have diversified greatly in the last generation. "Gospel Chapels" tend to be conservative; "Gospel Halls" even more so. "Bible Chapels" include both conservative and progressive assemblies, while "Community Churches" (often similar to the Brethren-affiliated "Evangelical Churches" of the United Kingdom) tend to be at the progressive end of the spectrum, often with salaried pastors, women taking an audible part in worship — and sometimes in leadership, and varying degrees of openness to the Charismatic movement. "Bible Churches" tend to embrace many progressive trends, but generally retain a male-only leadership and continue to disassociate themselves from the Charismatic movement.

Although Brethren leaders throughout New Zealand unanimously rejected the Charismatic movement in 1964, attitudes today are much more diverse. Complete rejection, and uncritical acceptance, of this movement are both minority positions among New Zealand Brethren today.

It is worth nothing that although many "Community Churches" and "Bible Churches" in New Zealand are part of the Open Brethren movement, others — such as Mairangi Bay Community Church and Auckland Bible Church — are not. This is often seen as one of many signs that the line of demarcation between Brethren assemblies and other independent Evangelical churches is becoming blurred — a situation that some Brethren welcome, and some do not.

The Brethren movement in Australia, too, has diversified, with the more progressive assemblies generally growing and the more conservative ones declining.

In both Australia and New Zealand, Open Brethren have been embarrassed by negative publicity surrounding the Plymouth Brethren Christian Church, a hardline branch of the Exclusive Brethren (and the only Exclusive group to exist in significant numbers in either country), which some defectors have accused of being a cult. In Australia, the Open Brethren network has rebranded itself as the Christian Community Churches of Australia, partly because of public confusion between their own movement and the Exclusives.

== Influence ==
The influence of the Plymouth Brethren upon evangelical Christianity exceeds their relatively small numerical proportion. The movement today has many congregations around the world.

Christian Missions in Many Lands (CMML), in the United States, Missionary Service Committee (MSC), in Canada, and Echoes of Service, in the United Kingdom, serve as support agencies for Brethren missionaries, helping with logistics and material support. These agencies help to equip and support those sent from local churches. Hudson Taylor, the founder of the China Inland Mission, kept strong ties with the Open Brethren, even though he was raised a Methodist and later was a member of a Baptist Church. The concept of "Faith Missions" can be traced back through Hudson Taylor, to the example of the early Brethren missionary, Anthony Norris Groves.

J.N. Darby, one of the original members and perhaps the best known of the movement, wrote over 50 books including a translation of the New Testament and is often credited with the development of the theology of "dispensationalism" and "pretribulationism" which have been widely adopted in evangelical churches outside of the brethren movement. In the early twentieth century, J.N. Darby's writings have the greatest influence on the Little Flock or Church Assembly Hall of Watchman Nee and Witness Lee.

Many leaders of the contemporary evangelical movement came from Brethren backgrounds. These include England-born Dr. D. Stuart Briscoe, author, international speaker and former senior pastor of Elmbrook Church (one of the 50 largest churches in the U.S.), in Brookfield, Wisconsin; Dr. Geoff Tunnicliffe, CEO of the World Evangelical Alliance; the late British scholar F. F. Bruce; 1956 Auca missionary martyrs Ed McCully, Jim Elliot and Peter Fleming; Walter Liefeld, NT professor at Trinity Evangelical Divinity School; the late preacher Dr. Harry A. Ironside, who wrote the Historical Sketch of the Brethren Movement. Radio personality Garrison Keillor was raised among the Plymouth Brethren, whom he sometimes refers to as the "sanctified brethren" in his News from "Lake Wobegon" monologues. Peter Maiden, the most recent previous leader of Operation Mobilisation, also came from the Brethren. Tony Evans, the widely syndicated radio broadcaster and pastor of Oak Cliff Bible Fellowship in Dallas, Texas comes from the Brethren assemblies. William MacDonald, the popular author and Bible commentator was also with the Open Brethren group. In Asia, Dr G D James (1920-2003), known for his widespread evangelistic ministry and the founder of Asia Evangelistic Fellowship (AEF) was associated with the Brethren movement.

=== Political influence ===
Some of the more conservative assemblies discourage political involvement, sometimes to the extent of judging anyone in fellowship who opts to exercise their voting rights in democratic, free elections. This teaching is based on the premise that the Bible teaches that Christians are citizens of heaven, only sojourners here on earth, and therefore ought not to become involved in activities which could be deemed as being too worldly. Some have claimed that the movement, with its upper-class roots, lacks compassion for the plight of the underprivileged, alleging, example, that it was left to non-Brethren like William Wilberforce, Lord Shaftesbury, and other politically active Christians to work toward the abolition of slavery and toward improving the welfare of factory children in the nineteenth century. Many Brethren, however, see this as unfair criticism and point to George Müller's ministry caring for homeless orphans and also to the sacrifices of its missionaries such as Anthony Norris Groves. It is more reasonable, they claim, to state that the Brethren are more concerned with people's spiritual needs than with their physical condition. However, where physical help is given, it tends to be given directly and not through secular organisations.

In some parts of the world, this aversion to political involvement is no longer widely held. At least two members of the New Zealand Parliament have belonged to the Open Brethren: Owen Jennings, an elder of the Karamea assembly (for the ACT New Zealand Party), and Joe Hawke (for the New Zealand Labour Party). Both served from 1996 to 2002. In Canada, Cam Guthrie, a member of Lakeside Church, a Brethren-rooted megachurch, was elected Mayor of Guelph, Ontario, in 2014. Frank Valeriote, the Liberal Party Member of Parliament for the riding of Guelph, also attends Lakeside Church, even though he identifies as Roman Catholic.

== Notable Brethren ==
N.B. This is a list of individuals who were part of the Open Brethren movement for at least a part of their lives. For a list of individuals involved in the Brethren movement before the 1848 schism, see the Plymouth Brethren article.

- John Bodkin Adams — General practitioner and suspected serial killer (tried for one murder but controversially acquitted)
- Cecil J. Allen - leading railways expert and writer on trains.
- Audrey Assad] — American singer-songwriter and recording artist
- Thomas John Barnardo — Took in destitute male and female street children; founded Barnardo's.
- Patricia Beer — Poet.
- Stuart Briscoe — author, international speaker and Minister-At-large at Elmbrook Church, was raised Plymouth Brethren, in England
- Edmund Hamer Broadbent — Missionary. First published in 1931 and still in print, his book, The Pilgrim Church is an alternative history of the church emphasizing historical precedents for the church "pattern" seen in Scripture by the Brethren (and related) movements.
- F. F. Bruce — twentieth-century British Bible scholar and Christian apologist.
- Geoffrey Bull — Missionary to Tibet in the early 1950s
- Wilson Carlile — British evangelist who founded Church Army and prebendary of St Paul's Cathedral
- William Coltman VC - most decorated stretcher bearer of WW1
- Henry Craik — Worked with George Mûller in Bristol at Gideon and Bethesda Chapels from 1832
- Sir William Dobbie — associated with the Second Boer War, World War I and World War II and rose to become a lieutenant-general in the British military
- Jim Elliot — Missionary killed by Waodani Indians along the Curaray River, in Ecuador.
- H. L. Ellison - twentieth-century British missionary, scholar, professor, and author.
- Tony Evans — Radio Bible Teacher and Pastor of Oakcliff Bible Fellowship in Dallas, Texas
- Peter Fleming — Missionary killed by the Waodani Indians along the Curaray River, in Ecuador
- Roger T. Forster — Author, theologian and leader of Ichthus Christian Fellowship
- David Willoughby Gooding — Professor Emeritus of Old Testament Greek at Queen's University Belfast and Christian author
- Robert P. Gordon - Professor of Hebrew at the University of Cambridge
- Anthony Norris Groves — Missionary to Baghdad and India
- Cam Guthrie — Mayor of Guelph, Ontario, Canada.
- Paul Harvey — Conservative American radio broadcaster for the ABC Radio Networks.
- Zane Hodges — Professor of New Testament Greek at Dallas Theological Seminary and co-author of the Greek New Testament according to the Majority Text
- John Eliot Howard — Chemist and quinologist
- Luke Howard — Chemist and meteorologist, the 'namer of clouds'
- Joe Hawke — New Zealand MP (New Zealand Labour Party, 1996–2002)
- Harry Ironside — Bible teacher, preacher and author; Pastor of the Moody Church in Chicago (1930-1948).
- Gordon Jackson (politician) — Scottish politician and Queen's Counsel
- Owen Jennings, New Zealand MP (ACT New Zealand Party, 1996–2002)
- Kenneth Kitchen - Professor of Egyptology at the University of Liverpool
- Maurice Koechlin — Structural Engineer. Chief Engineer in the construction of the Eiffel Tower
- J. Laurence Kulp — twentieth-century geologist. Critic of Young Earth creationism
- John Lennox — Mathematician, bioethicist, and Christian apologist, Professor Emeritus at the University of Oxford.
- G. H. Lang (November 20, 1874 – October 20, 1958), was a noted Bible teacher, prolific author, and biblical scholar of his time.
- Erich Sauer — (December 31, 1898 – February 25, 1959) A German Bible scholar, theologian, and principal of the Wiedenest Bible School in Germany for many years
- Sir John William Laing (1879–1978). — British entrepreneur in the construction industry
- William MacDonald — Christian author and scholar, author of well known Believer's Bible Commentary
- Peter Maiden — International Director Emeritus of Operation Mobilisation, Minister at Large of Keswick Ministries
- Jim McCotter — Was a part of Brethren in early life. Left and was the founder of Great Commission Churches
- Ed McCully — Studying to be a lawyer at Marquette University, McCully became a missionary instead and was killed by the Waodani Indians along the Curaray River, in Ecuador
- Brian D. McLaren — Prominent and controversial voice in the Emerging Church movement. Raised in a Brethren family.
- Alan Millard - Professor of Hebrew and Ancient Semitic languages at the University of Liverpool
- George Müller — Founder of the Bristol Orphanage and a stated teacher in Bethesda Chapel, Bristol
- Thomas Newberry — Translator of the Newberry Reference Bible, which uses a system of symbols to explain verb tenses
- Dessie O'Hare — Irish Republican terrorist.
- Camillo Pace — Italian evangelist (1862-1948).
- Frederick Handley Page — Pioneer in the design and manufacture of aircraft
- Luis Palau — Argentinian-American evangelist, raised in the Plymouth Brethren.
- John Parnell, 2nd Baron Congleton — Missionary to Mesopotamia
- G. H. Pember — An English theologian who lived in the nineteenth century and also wrote the book Earth's earliest ages.
- Joseph M. Scriven — Writer of the words to the hymn, "What A Friend We Have In Jesus".
- Arthur Rendle Short — Professor of surgery at Bristol University and author
- William Gibson Sloan — Scottish missionary to the Faroe Islands
- Samuel Prideaux Tregelles — English biblical scholar and theologian
- Elsie Tu, then Elsie Elliott — A Plymouth Brethren missionary in China before leaving the movement and becoming a prominent political figure in Hong Kong
- William Edwy Vine — Author of, Vine's Expository Dictionary of Old and New Testament Words, and numerous commentaries
- Arthur Wallis — Founder of the British New Church Movement, formerly in the Plymouth Brethren.
- Jim Wallis — Founder and editor of Sojourners magazine, raised in a Brethren family.
- Charles Gidley Wheeler– Author of The Believer, and A Good Boy Tomorrow: Memoirs of a Fundamentalist Upbringing – Fleet Air Arm pilot, TV dramatist, novelist and philosopher – was raised in the Plymouth Brethren before breaking away at the age of 16.
- Smith Wigglesworth — Pentecostal preacher. Testified that he had received his grounding in Bible teaching within the Plymouth Brethren
- Hugh G.M. Williamson - Professor of Hebrew at the University of Oxford
- Orde Wingate — British Major General, advisor to Hagana units during the 1930s

== Major collection of literature ==
The largest Christian Brethren Archive in the world is housed at the John Rylands University Library in Oxford Road, Manchester. It contains a large collection of materials, including books and manuscripts, relating to assemblies or meetings of Christians often called Plymouth Brethren, with particular reference to the British Isles.

The second largest collection of Brethren material in the world, as well as being the largest in North America is found at the library of Emmaus Bible College in Dubuque, Iowa.

== See also ==
- Elder
