= P. C. John =

Indian missionary

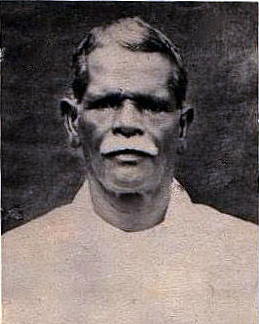
P.C.John

Paddinjattedathu Chacko John (1875–1943) was an evangelist and Bible teacher from the Indian State of Kerala. Raised among the Saint Thomas Christians, he joined the Plymouth Brethren as an adult, and is regarded today as one of the pioneers of the Kerala Brethren.
