= Dispensation =

Dispensation may refer to:

- Dispensation (Catholic canon law), the suspension, by competent authority, of general rules of law in particular cases in the Catholic Church
- Dispensation (theology), a period in history according to various religions
- Dispensation (album), an album by Jimsaku

== See also ==
- Dispensation of the fulness of times, a concept in Mormon doctrine
- Dispensationalism
- Classification of Pharmaco-Therapeutic Referrals
- Dispenser (disambiguation)
- Dispensing (disambiguation)
