= Bakht Singh =

Indian Christian Evangelist (1903–2000)

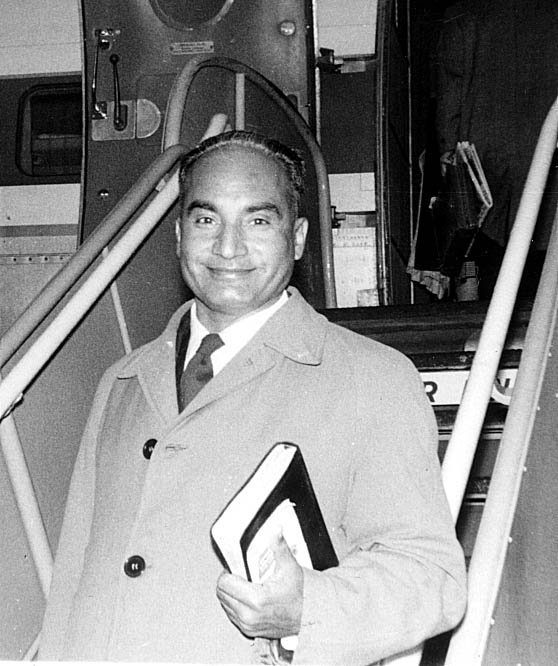
- Born: Bakht Singh Chabra; 6 June 1903; Sargodha District, Punjab, British India
- Died: 17 September 2000 (aged 97); Hyderabad, India
- Burial place: Narayanaguda Burial Ground, Hyderabad, India
- Other name: Bro. Bakht Singh
- Citizenship: Indian
- Occupations: Evangelist, Author, pastor
- Years active: 1926 - 2000
- Known for: Hebron Ministries
- Parents: Lal Jawahar Mal (father); Lakshmi Bai Joya (mother)

Bakht Singh Chabra also known as Brother Bakht Singh (6 June 1903 – 17 September 2000) was a Christian evangelist in India. He is often regarded as one of the most well-known Bible teachers and preachers and pioneers of the Indian Church movement and Gospel contextualization. According to Indian traditions, he is also known as 'Elijah of 21st Century' in Christendom. According to his autobiography, Bakht Singh became a Christian when he was an engineering student in Canada in 1929, even though previously he had torn up the Bible and was strongly opposed to Christianity. He was Colonial India's foremost evangelist, preacher and indigenous church planter who founded churches and established Hebron Ministries. He began a worldwide indigenous church-planting movement in India that grew to more than 10,000 local churches. Bakht Singh died on 17 September 2000, in Hyderabad, India.

== Early life ==
Bakht Singh was born during the British Raj in India to religious Sikh parents Shri. Lal Jawahar Mal and Smt. Lakshmi Bai Joya in 1903 in Joiya village, Sargodha District of the Punjab, British India. He studied in a Christian missionary school. He was actively involved in social work through the Sikh temple. He was married to Rama Bai at the age of 12, on 6 June 1915. After graduating from Punjab University he went to England for higher studies in 1926 and studied Agricultural Engineering. His parents were not in favor of him going to England; they were concerned that he would be influenced by Christians. Bakht Singh promised his parents that he would not be converted.

== Life in England and Canada ==
In England, he enjoyed the freedom of, and was greatly influenced by, the British lifestyle. He quickly adapted to this lifestyle, started smoking and drinking, travelled around Europe, and indulged in all kinds of fun and entertainment. He shaved his long hair, breaking kesh, or the practice of Sikhism to allow one's hair to grow naturally out of respect for the perfection of the creation of Waheguru. Years later he went to Kings College in London, and in 1929, Bakht Singh went to Canada and continued his studies in agricultural engineering at the University of Manitoba in Winnipeg, Manitoba. He was befriended by John and Edith Hayward, local residents and devout Christians, who invited him to live with them. The Haywards always read the Bible at every supper; they also gave him a Bible. He liked their company and he visited church and started reading the Bible. After seeking for some time, he became Christian and was baptized on 4 February 1932 in Vancouver, British Columbia.

== Christian work in India ==
Bakht Singh returned to India in 1933 and met his parents in Bombay. He had earlier informed his parents about his conversion by a letter. Reluctantly, they accepted him but requested him to keep it a secret for the sake of the family's honor. Upon his refusal, they left him. Suddenly, he was homeless. But he started preaching in the streets of Bombay. Soon he started attracting large crowds.

Bakht Singh began speaking as a fiery itinerant preacher and revivalist throughout colonial India, gaining a large following. He at first preached as an Anglican evangelist before becoming independent. "Singh's role in the 1937 revival that swept the Martinbur United Presbyterian Church inaugurated one of the most notable movements in the history of the church in the Indian subcontinent," stated Jonathan Bonk in Biographical Dictionary of Christian Missions published by Simon & Schuster Macmillan in 1998.

He started thoroughly contextualized local assemblies patterned on New Testament principles after spending a night in prayer on a mountaintop at Pallavaram, Chennai in 1941. He held his first "Holy Convocation", based on Leviticus 23, in Madras in 1941. After this, the convocations were held annually in Madras and Hyderabad in the south, and in Ahmedabad and Kalimpong in the north. The one in Hyderabad was always the largest, drawing up to 25,000 participants. They would eat and sleep in huge tents, and meet under a large thatched pandal for hours-long prayer, praise and teaching meetings that began at dawn and ended late at night. The care and feeding of guests was handled by volunteers. Expenses for the meetings were given by voluntary offerings; no appeals were issued.

Bro Bakht Singh expounded on believer-priesthood. All believers are equal in the sight of God.

== Testimonies ==
J. Edwin Orr, a British Church historian: "Brother Bakht Singh is an Indian equivalent of the greater Western evangelists, as skillful as Finney and as direct as Dwight L. Moody. He is a first-class Bible teacher of the order of G. Campbell Morgan or Graham Scroggie."

Dave Hunt, an apologetics writer: "The arrival of Bakht Singh turned the churches of Madras upside down. . . . Crowds gathered in the open air, as many as 12,000 on one occasion to hear this man of God. Many seriously ill were healed when Bakht Singh prayed for them, even deaf and dumb began to hear and speak."

Bob Finley, President of Christian Aid Mission: "I have never seen a man who has a greater knowledge and understanding of the Bible than Bakht Singh. All our Western preachers and teachers seem to be children before this great man of God."

Norman Grubb missionary statesman, author and teacher: "In all my missionary experience I think these churches on their New Testament foundations are the nearest I have seen to a replica of the early church and a pattern for the birth and growth of the young churches in all the countries which we used to talk about as mission fields."

Jonathan Bonk: "Singh's role in the 1937 revival that swept the Martinbur United Presbyterian Church inaugurated one of the most notable movements in the history of the church in the Indian subcontinent."

T. E. Koshy, has published biographies of Bhakt Singh which is widely popular, stressing on how impactful Singh was on missionaries such as him.

== Death ==
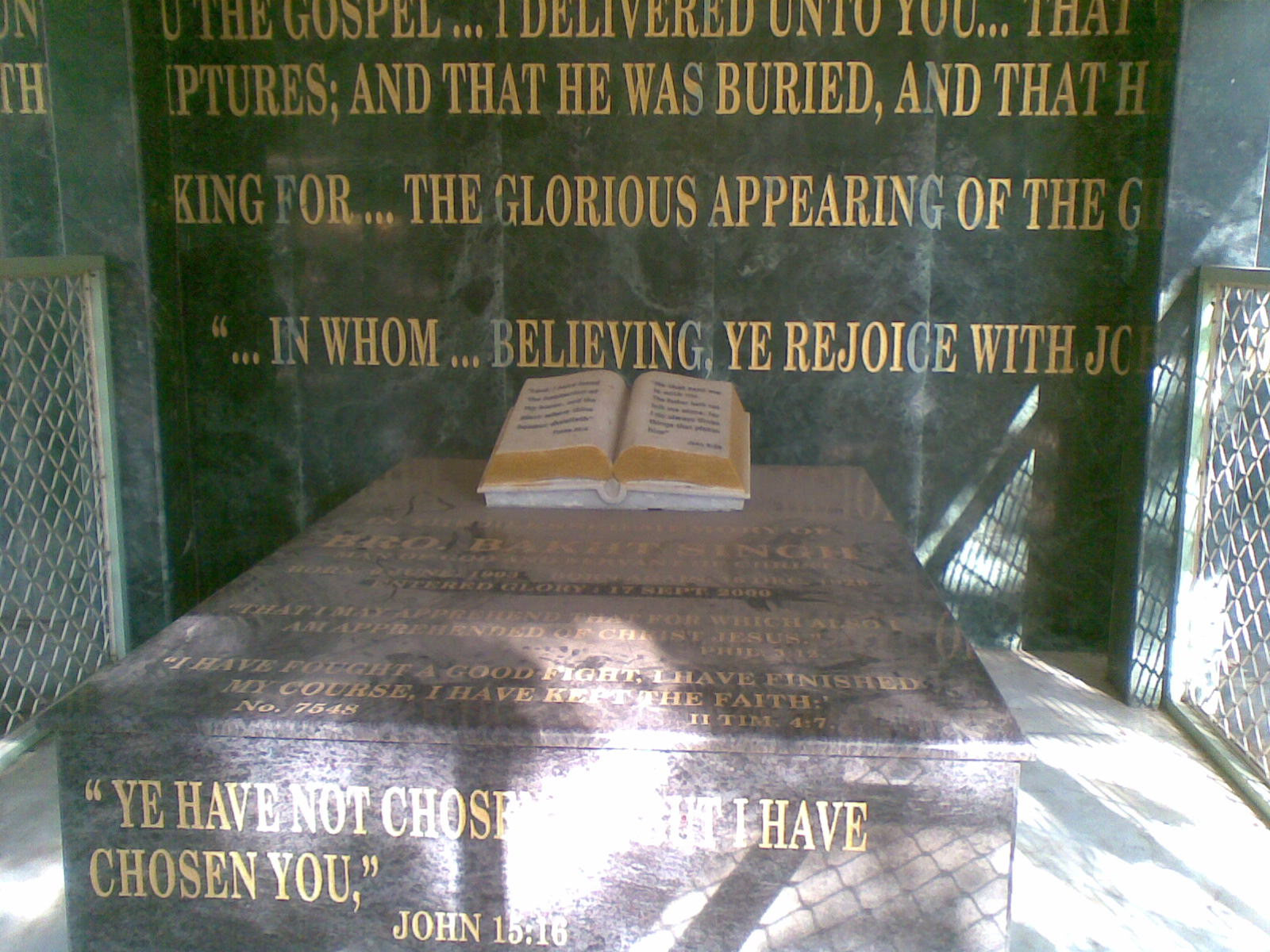
Grave of Bakht singh

On 17 September 2000, Singh died in his sleep and was buried at Christian Cemetery, Narayanguda. The funeral was attended by nearly 250,000 people.

== Books ==
- Bethany (1971)
- God's Dwelling Place (1973)
- The Return of God's Glory (1973)
- The Skill of Loving Hands (1978)
- The Joy of the Lord (1984)
- Forty mountain peaks, a study of Isaiah chapters 24-66 (1971)
- David Recovered all (1967)
- The true salt (1973)
- My Chosen (1964)
- The Overcomer's Secret
- The Voice of the Lord (1970)
- The Holy Spirit His Works and significance (1974)
- Walk Before Me Studies in the life of Abraham (1975)
- Fullness of God
- Much Business (1977)
- The Greatest secret: Power of His resurrection
- Salt and Light (1964)
- A Word In Season To The Weary

== See also ==
- Sadhu Sundar Singh
- Pandita Ramabai
