= Tiruvalla Medical Mission Hospital =

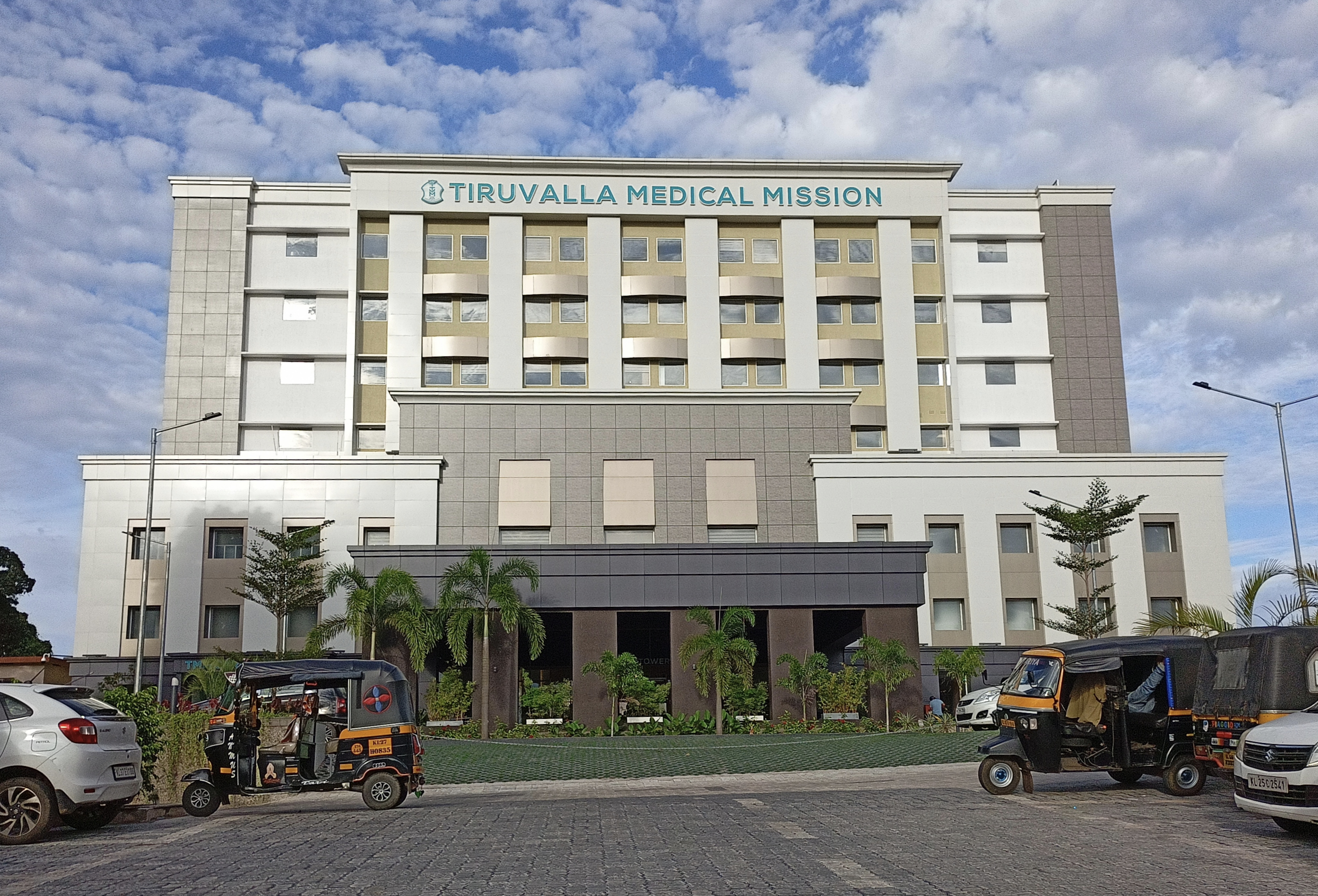
- The main hospital building of Tiruvalla Medical Mission.

Geography
- Location: Tiruvalla, Kerala, India

Organisation
- Type: General, Teaching
- Affiliated university: TMM College of Nursing

Links
- Website: tmmhospital.org

Tiruvalla Medical Mission (TMM) Hospital is a major hospital and a nursing education institution located in Tiruvalla, Kerala, India. It is managed by The Dewan Bahadur Dr. V. Verghese Hospital Trust Association.

== History ==
The hospital was founded in 1935 by Dewan Bahadur Dr. V. Verghese, the former personal physician to the Maharaja of Cochin. He established a small hospital on a wooded hillock near the Tiruvalla railway station.

In 1940, Dr. Verghese constituted a charitable trust and handed over the hospital to medical missionaries of the Brethren persuasion. The trust is registered as a charitable society under the Travancore Cochin Literary, Scientific and Charitable Societies Registration Act, 1955.

A nurses training course was started at the hospital in 1943, marking the beginning of the TMM School of Nursing. The school was recognized by the Indian Nursing Council in 1950. The institution expanded its education by founding the TMM College of Nursing in 2004.

== Services and governance ==
TMM Hospital offers services across various medical specialties and operates a busy emergency department. The trust also runs community outreach programs.

The hospital is governed by the aforementioned charitable trust. As of 2019, the institution's chief executive officer was Mr. George Koshy.

== Legacy ==
The institution celebrated 90 years of service in 2025. The School of Nursing, established in 1943, is noted as one of the earliest private nursing institutions in Central Travancore.

== See also ==
- Thiruvalla
- List of hospitals in India
