= Oelrichs =

Oelrichs may refer to:

- Oelrichs, South Dakota, U.S., a community

== People ==
- Blanche Oelrichs (1890–1950), known as Michael Strange, American poet, playwright and actress
- Charles May Oelrichs (1858–1932), American broker and clubman
- Hermann Oelrichs (1850–1906), American businessman, or his son (1891–1948)
- Marjorie Oelrichs (1908–1937), American socialite and wife of bandleader Eddy Duchin
- Peter Andresen Oelrichs (1781–1869), German sailor and author
- Theresa Fair Oelrichs (1871–1926), American socialite, wife of the elder Hermann Oelrichs

== See also ==
- Oelrich, a surname
