= Paul Frederick =

Paul Frederick may refer to:

- Paul Jones (wrestler) (1942–2018), né Paul Frederick, American professional wrestler and wrestling manager
- Paul Frederick, Grand Duke of Mecklenburg-Schwerin (1800–1842)
- Duke Paul Frederick of Mecklenburg (1852–1923)
- Duke Paul Frederick of Mecklenburg (1882–1904)
