= Marie of Mecklenburg =

Marie of Mecklenburg or Marie of Mecklenburg-Schwerin may refer to:

- Duchess Maria of Mecklenburg-Schwerin (1363/1367-1402), duchess of Pomerania
- Duchess Marie of Mecklenburg (1878–1948), daughter of Adolf Friedrich V, Grand Duke of Mecklenburg-Strelitz and Princess Elisabeth of Anhalt
- Duchess Marie Antoinette of Mecklenburg (1884–1944), daughter of Duke Paul Frederick of Mecklenburg and Princess Marie of Windisch-Graetz
- Duchess Marie of Mecklenburg-Schwerin (1854–1920), daughter of Grand Duke Frederick Francis II of Mecklenburg-Schwerin and Princess Augusta of Reuss-Köstritz
- Duchess Marie Louise of Mecklenburg-Schwerin (1803–1862), daughter of Frederick Louis, Hereditary Grand Duke of Mecklenburg-Schwerin and consort of Georg, Duke of Saxe-Altenburg
