= Marie Norton Harriman =

American art collector (1903–1970)

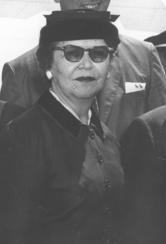
- Harriman in 1956

First Lady of New York
- In role January 1, 1955 – December 31, 1958
- Governor: W. Averell Harriman
- Preceded by: Frances Dewey
- Succeeded by: Mary Rockefeller

Personal details
- Born: Marie Norton; April 12, 1903 New York City, NY, U.S.
- Died: September 26, 1970 (aged 67) Washington D.C., U.S.
- Spouses: Cornelius Vanderbilt Whitney (m. 1923; div. 1929) W. Averell Harriman (m. 1930)
- Children: 2
- Education: Miss Spence's School

Marie Harriman (née Norton, formerly Whitney; April 12, 1903 – September 26, 1970) was an American art collector and First Lady of New York from 1955 to 1958. She was the second wife of former New York Governor and diplomat Averell Harriman. Harriman operated a prominent New York City art gallery for more than a decade.

== Early life ==
She was born Marie Norton on April 12, 1903, in New York to Sheridan Shook Norton, an attorney, and Beulah Sanfield Einstein, who wed in 1901. Her maternal grandparents were Rosanna Cullen and Benjamin Franklin Einstein, attorney to the New York Times and a shareholder in several advertising companies. B.J. Einstein and Cullen were Jewish by birth and conversion, respectively. She attended Miss Spence's School, graduating in 1922.

== Career ==
From 1930 to 1942, she owned and operated an art gallery on 57th Street in Manhattan, the Marie Harriman Gallery. She later said: "It was all Ave's idea. He said I should be doing something." Henri Matisse attended the glittering opening of the gallery on October 3, 1930, which featured important works of Derain, Gauguin, Van Gogh, and Matisse. In 1936, she bought and exhibited one of Gauguin's last works, D'où Venons Nous / Que Sommes Nous / Où Allons Nous. The gallery's exhibitions took many forms and included a show dedicated to a single canvas, Henri Rousseau's La Noce; solo shows devoted to such comparatively unknown figures as Josselin Bodley (1893–1974), Sir Francis Rose, and Emile Branchard; group shows of French modernists, the Paris Fauves of 1905, and American primitives ("They Taught Themselves"); and others with a particular focus like "Chardin and the Modern Still Life" and 19th-century French primitives.

In the 1930s, she also undertook major projects for her husband's business ventures, designing the interiors of the first streamlined passenger cars for the Union Pacific Railroad and decorating the public rooms and accommodations of a resort he developed in Sun Valley, Idaho.

In 1937, she took on responsibility for raising Peter Duchin, son of bandleader Eddy Duchin and his wife Marjorie, a close friend of Marie's who had died from complications during childbirth.

During World War II, she worked as a volunteer with the Ship Service Committee that managed welfare and recreation programs for navy personnel of the Allied forces whose ships docked in New York. She also sheltered two English girls sent overseas to escape the London blitz.

=== First Lady of New York ===
During her husband's years as Governor of New York from 1955 to 1958, she served as his Albany hostess and redecorated the governor's residence with art that ranged from colonial to contemporary: Gilbert Stuart, Copley, Whistler, and Walter Kuhn.

== Personal life ==
1923 news clipping of her then-forthcoming nuptials to Cornelius Vanderbilt Whitney

On March 5, 1923, she married Cornelius Vanderbilt Whitney (1899–1992) in Paris, the first of his eventual four wives. Whitney was the son of Harry Payne Whitney and Gertrude Vanderbilt. Before their Reno divorce, on grounds of incompatibility, in 1929, they had two children:

- Harry Payne Whitney II (1924–1985), who married Alexandra Ewing (1927–2014), the daughter of Gifford Cochran Ewing and Frances Riker. and later Andrea R. Whitney
- Nancy Marie Whitney (1926–2006), who married four times and divorced three times:
  - in 1949 to Edwin Denison Morgan III (1921–2001), by whom she had two children:
    - Alida Morgan
    - Pamela Morgan
  - on August 26, 1957, to (Charles) Russell Hurd
  - on July 1, 1958, to his older widowed brother, Edward Augustus Hurd Jr.
  - and finally, to well known water colorist Pierre Lutz (1923–1991).

In 1930, Marie remarried, to W. Averell Harriman (1891–1986), a businessman and son of railroad baron Edward H. Harriman and Mary Williamson Averell. He was the brother of E. Roland Harriman and Mary Harriman Rumsey. Harriman's father was a close friend of Hall Roosevelt, the brother of Eleanor Roosevelt. Harriman had previously been married to Kitty Lanier Lawrence until 1929, with whom he had two daughters: (1) Mary Averell Harriman (1917–1996), who married Dr. Shirley C. Fisk and (2) Kathleen Lanier Harriman (1917–2011), who married Stanley Grafton Mortimer Jr. (1913–1999), who had previously been married to socialite Babe Paley (1915–1978).

On their honeymoon in Europe, the Harrimans purchased oil paintings by Van Gogh, Degas, Cézanne, Picasso, and Renoir. They later donated many of the works she bought and collected, including those of the artist Walt Kuhn, to the National Gallery of Art in Washington, D.C. In 1971, after her death in 1970, Harriman married Pamela Beryl Digby Churchill Hayward, the former wife of Winston Churchill's son Randolph, and widow of Broadway producer Leland Hayward.

=== Philanthropy and death ===
In the years before her death, she concentrated her charitable work on the New York Association for the Blind and the Robert F. Kennedy Memorial Foundation.

Harriman died of a heart attack on September 26, 1970, at George Washington University Hospital in Washington, D.C.
