= Henry May (American politician) =

American politician from Maryland (1816–1866)

Member of the U.S. House of Representatives from Maryland's 5th district
- In office March 4, 1853 – March 3, 1855
- Preceded by: Alexander Evans
- Succeeded by: Henry William Hoffman

Member of the U.S. House of Representatives from Maryland's 4th district
- In office March 4, 1861 – March 3, 1863
- Preceded by: Henry Winter Davis
- Succeeded by: Francis Thomas

Personal details
- Born: February 13, 1816 Washington, D.C., U.S.
- Died: September 25, 1866 (aged 50) Baltimore, Maryland, U.S.
- Resting place: Cathedral Cemetery; Baltimore, Maryland, U.S.
- Party: Democratic
- Relations: Hermann Oelrichs (nephew); Charles May Oelrichs (nephew)

Henry May (February 13, 1816 – September 25, 1866) was a U.S. representative from Maryland.

== Early life ==
May was born in Washington, D.C., on February 13, 1816. He was a son of Dr. Frederick May and Juliana Mathilda (née Slacum) May. His siblings included John Frederick May, William May, Julia Matilda (née May) Oelrichs (mother of Hermann Oelrichs, Charles May Oelrichs and Lucie Oelrichs Jay), Laura (née May) Wise (the wife of Gen. George D. Wise), and Julian S. May. His father, who was born in Boston, was a medical doctor who spent nearly the last fifty years of his life practicing in Washington.

His paternal grandparents were Abigail (née May) May and Col. John May, who participated in the Boston Tea Party and became a prominent soldier in the American Revolutionary War.

He attended Columbian College (later George Washington University), also in Washington, D.C. He studied law, was admitted to the bar in 1840, and commenced practice.

== Career ==
In 1850, May was sent by President Franklin Pierce to Mexico to investigate claims under the United States' treaty of peace with Mexico. He moved to Baltimore, Maryland. In 1852, May was elected as a Democrat to the Thirty-third Congress, serving one term from March 4, 1853 to March 3, 1855. He was an unsuccessful candidate for reelection in 1854 to the Thirty-fourth Congress, but was elected as a Unionist to the Thirty-seventh Congress, serving from March 4, 1861 to March 3, 1863.

May sat in the special session of Congress held in summer 1861 after the outbreak of the Civil War. In September 1861 May was arrested without charges or recourse to habeas corpus on suspicion of treason and held in Fort Lafayette. (Lincoln had unilaterally suspended habeas in Maryland in spring 1861, a move ruled unconstitutional without Congressional authorization in June 1861 by Supreme Court Chief Justice Roger Taney in ex parte Merryman, a disputed ruling which Lincoln disregarded.) May was eventually released—no charges were ever brought or evidence produced—and returned to his seat in Congress in December 1861. In March 1862 he introduced a bill requiring the federal government to either indict by grand jury or release all other "political prisoners" held indefinitely without recourse to habeas. The provisions of May's bill were included in the March 1863 Habeas Corpus Act in which Congress finally authorized Lincoln to suspend habeas corpus, but required actual indictments for suspected traitors. The "political prisoners" affected included Baltimore newspaper editor, and vocal Lincoln critic, Frank Key Howard, who had been a co-prisoner with May, and was also a grand-nephew of Chief Justice Taney's wife Anne Key, (Francis Scott Key's sister).

In 1862, Henry May and Ohio Congressman Clement Vallandigham, an anti-war Democrat, led an investigation into telegraphic censorship of the press instituted by Lincoln's Secretary of State William H. Seward in certain cities.

== Personal life ==
On November 29, 1845 May was married to Henrietta de Courcy (1820–1919) in Chester, Maryland. She was the daughter of William Henry de Courcy and Eliza Bond (née Rozier) de Courcy. Together, they were the parents of:

- Frederick DeCourcy May (1846–1893), a surgeon who served in the Franco-Prussian War and, later, as president of the New York Shipbuilding Corporation; he married Cecilia Coleman.
- Rosalie May (1848–1922), who married John Sterett Gittings, the Treasurer of Maryland, in 1877.
- Henry May (1854–1936), who married Isabel Theresa Coleman of New Jersey in 1881.
- George May (1855–1931), who became a prominent Baltimore banker with Alex. Brown & Sons.
- Julia May (1859–1954), who married George Albert Bech, a son of Edward Bech, in 1887. After Bech's death in 1890, she married William Babcock and moved to California.
- Lilian Marie May (1863–1958), who married William Bagot, 4th Baron Bagot, the Aide-de-Camp to the Governor General of Canada, in 1903.

He died on September 25, 1866, in Baltimore, and is interred in Cathedral Cemetery. His widow died in Hove, Sussex in 1919.

U.S. House of Representatives
Preceded by Alexander Evans	Member of the U.S. House of Representatives from Maryland's 5th congressional district 1853–1855	Succeeded by Henry William Hoffman
Preceded by Henry Winter Davis	Member of the U.S. House of Representatives from Maryland's 4th congressional district 1861–1863	Succeeded by Francis Thomas
