= Rosecliff =

Historic house museum in Rhode Island, US

- U.S. National Register of Historic Places
- U.S. National Historic Landmark District – Contributing property
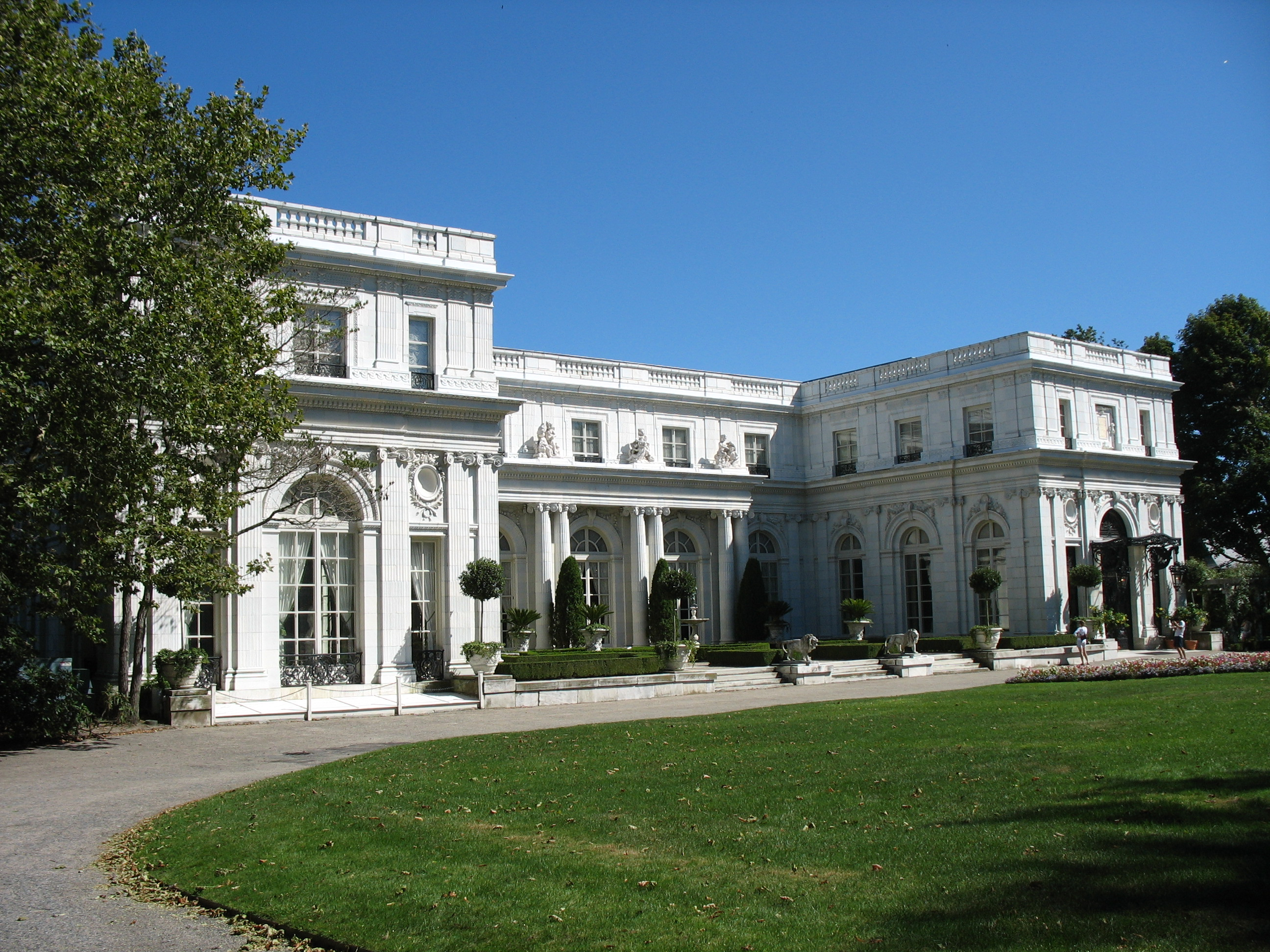

- Location within Rhode Island Location within the United States
- Location: 548 Bellevue Ave., Newport, Rhode Island
- Coordinates: 41°27′55″N 71°18′20″W
- Area: 6.5 acres (2.6 ha)
- Built: 1898-1902
- Architect: Stanford White McKim, Mead & White
- Architectural style: French Baroque Revival
- Part of: Bellevue Avenue Historic District (ID72000023)
- NRHP reference No.: 73000059

Significant dates
- Added to NRHP: February 6, 1973
- Designated NHLDCP: December 8, 1972

Rosecliff is a Gilded Age mansion of Newport, Rhode Island, now open to the public as a historic house museum. The house has also been known as the Hermann Oelrichs House or the J. Edgar Monroe House.

It was built 1898–1902 by Theresa Fair Oelrichs, a silver heiress from Nevada, whose father James Graham Fair was one of the four partners in the Comstock Lode. She was the wife of Hermann Oelrichs, American agent for Norddeutscher Lloyd steamship line. She and her husband, together with her sister, Virginia Fair, bought the land in 1891 from the estate of George Bancroft and commissioned the architectural firm of McKim, Mead, and White to design a summer home suitable for entertaining on a grand scale. With little other pursuits to follow, she "threw herself into the social scene with tremendous gusto, becoming, with Mrs. Stuyvesant Fish and Mrs. O.H.P. Belmont (of nearby Belcourt), one of the three great hostesses of Newport."

The principal architect, Stanford White, modeled the mansion after the Grand Trianon of Versailles, but smaller and reduced to a basic "H" shape, while keeping Mansart's scheme of a glazed arcade of arched windows and paired Ionic pilasters, which increase to columns across the central loggia. White's Rosecliff adds to the Grand Trianon a second storey with a balustraded roofline that conceals the set-back third storey, containing twenty small servants' rooms and the pressing room for the laundry.

== Construction and interiors ==
The commission was given to McKim, Mead, and White in 1898, and the New York branch of Jules Allard and Sons were engaged as interior decorators. Construction started in 1899, but the sharp winter slowed construction; Mrs. Oelrichs' sister had married William K. Vanderbilt II that winter season, and the house was required for parties in the following Newport season; the eager Mrs. Oelrichs moved in July 1900, sending the workmen out in order to give a first party in August, a dinner for one hundred and twelve to outdo Mrs. Stuyvesant Fish's Harvest Festival Ball at Crossways. Ferns and floral arrangements concealed the unfinished areas. The house was not completed until 1902.

Rosecliff's brick construction is clad in white architectural terracotta tiles. Stanford White's spatial planning offered views en filade through aligned doorways centered on monumental fireplaces with projecting overmantels.

The central corps de logis is entirely taken up with the ballroom as it appeared on White's plans which, with the Louis XIV furniture removed, could serve as Newport's largest ballroom at 40 by 80 feet (12 by 24 m). Its scheme of single and paired Corinthian pilasters alternating with arch-headed windows and recessed doorways echoes the articulation of the exterior. This is reached through the French doors on either side, to a plain terrace dropping by broad stairs to the lawn facing the ocean, or to a planted terrace garden with a central fountain.

In the northernmost of the wings that project from both sides of the central block, is a dining room and a billiard room separated by a marble anteroom backed, on the service side, by a butler's pantry with two dumbwaiters. These communicate with the all-but-subterranean kitchens below which were lit, invisibly, from the sunken service yard on the north side of the house. The main entrance, on the opposite south wing, is through a vestibule where the exterior Ionic order is carried inside, now suitably enriched, under an emphatic cornice that divides the height 2:3.

The vestibule is separated, by a tripartite screen with an arched central opening flanked above the cornice by bull's-eye openings in which baroque vases stand, from a grand Stair Hall. The Stair Hall projects from the south block to accommodate a grand staircase that sweeps forward through a heart-shaped opening into the floor space. This divides at a landing to return in matched recurving flights to the upper floor.

Beyond the Stair Hall is the Salon with the same proportions as the Dining Room (3:4, or 30 by 40 feet) and like it, originally hung with tapestry. Its ceiling is coffered. Its overscaled Gothic fireplace of Caen stone is the one eclectic anomaly in Rosecliff's interiors.

Upstairs, three grand bedrooms of equal importance and guest bedrooms of graduated sizes may be linked by opened doors or isolated by locked ones, in a flexible arrangement of rooms or suites, all with baths, and all separated from the wide corridor by intervening dressing closets for hermetic privacy from the staff, who moved up and down stairs by means of two small service stairs contrived in spaces smaller than the master bedrooms' walk-in closets.

The most famous of Mrs. Oelrich's parties was the "Bal blanc" of 19 August 1904 to celebrate the Astor Cup Races, in which everything was white and silver.

Mrs. Oelrich died at Newport on November 22, 1926. The funeral took place in the "beautiful blue and gold tapestry room" at Rosecliff.

=== Monroe family ===
Hermann Oelrichs, Jr. kept Rosecliff in the family until 1941, then the estate went through several changes of ownership before being bought by Mr & Mrs J. Edgar Monroe of New Orleans in 1947. Mr. Monroe, a southern gentleman who had made his fortune in the ship building industry, came to Newport with his wife Louise every summer to escape the summer heat of the Deep South. The two became well known for the large parties they threw at Rosecliff; many of which had a mardi gras theme, as the Monroes loved dressing up in fancy costumes for these parties. Unlike Mrs. Oelrichs' parties, which were stiff and formal, the Monroes' parties were relaxed and easygoing.

Hermann Oelrichs Jr. sold off all the furnishings in 1941. In 1971, Mr. and Mrs. Monroe donated the entire estate with its contents and a $2 million operating endowment to the Preservation Society of Newport County, who opened it to the public for tours. Mr. Monroe often would come back to the estate for charity events up until his death in 1991.

The American Beauty Rose was developed by earlier owner of the property George Bancroft and his gardener.

== In television and film ==
The ballroom was used to film scenes for the 1974 version of The Great Gatsby and for The Betsy, High Society, True Lies, and Amistad.

Footage for three episodes of the PBS television series Antiques Roadshow was shot inside and on the grounds of Rosecliff on September 19, 2017, with 3,000 people attending to have their antiques appraised. It was the first time in its 22 seasons on the air that any of the show's episodes included appraisals filmed outdoors, although plans for all the appraisals to take place outdoors were spoiled by rain generated by Hurricane Jose offshore, and most of the appraisals took place inside the mansion or in tents erected on its grounds. The three episodes premiered on PBS in May 2018.

The ballroom’s iconic ceiling appears in the opening credits of the HBO costume drama, The Gilded Age, and the mansion’s façade was transposed to a New York City street in season 1.

== See also ==
- Peter Duchin
- Baroque Revival architecture
- List of Gilded Age mansions
- National Register of Historic Places listings in Newport County, Rhode Island
