= Charles May Oelrichs =

American broker and clubman (1858–1932)

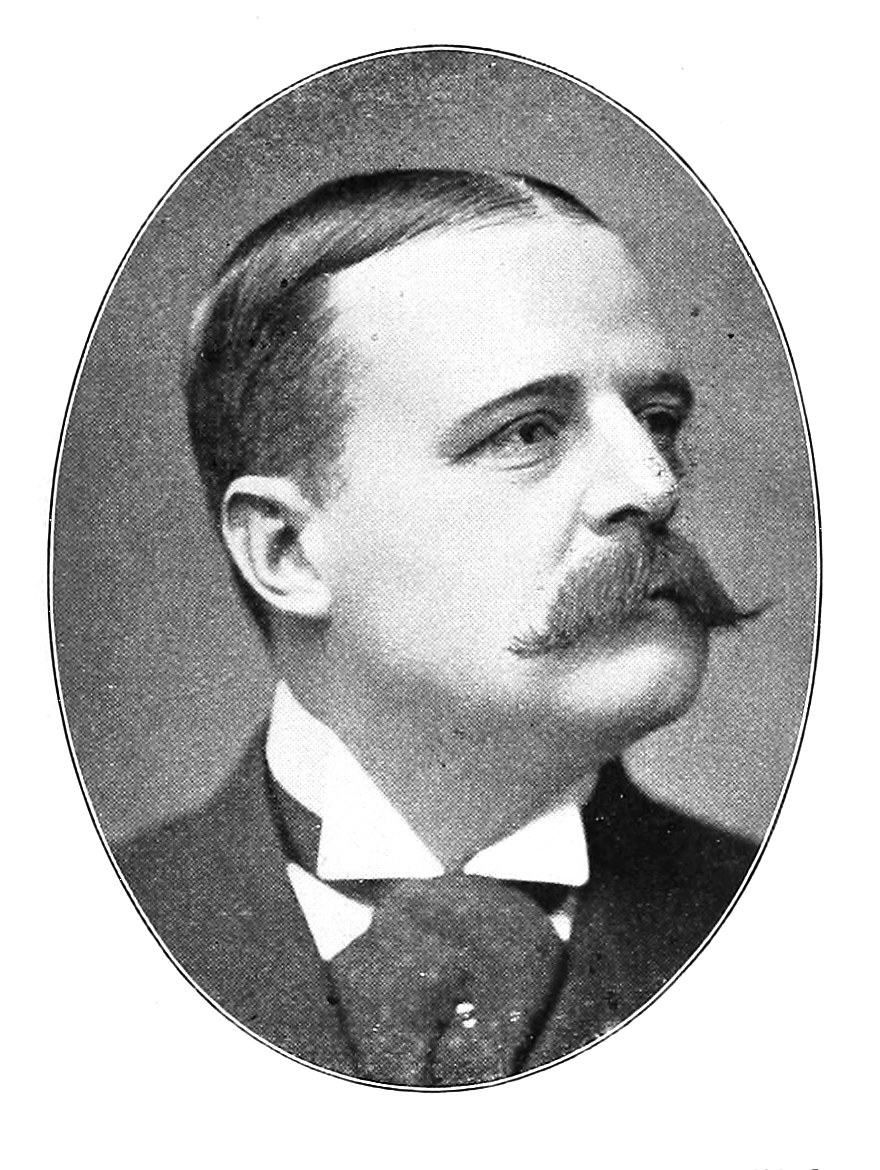
- Born: August 27, 1858; Baltimore, Maryland, U.S.
- Died: January 15, 1932 (aged 73); Newport, Rhode Island, U.S.
- Spouse: Blanche de Loosey (1880–1932)
- Children: 4, including Blanche
- Parent(s): Henry Ferdinand Oelrichs; Julia Matilda May
- Relatives: Diana Barrymore (granddaughter); William Jay (brother-in-law)

Charles May Oelrichs (August 27, 1858 – January 15, 1932) was an American broker and clubman who was prominent in New York society during the Gilded Age.

== Early life ==
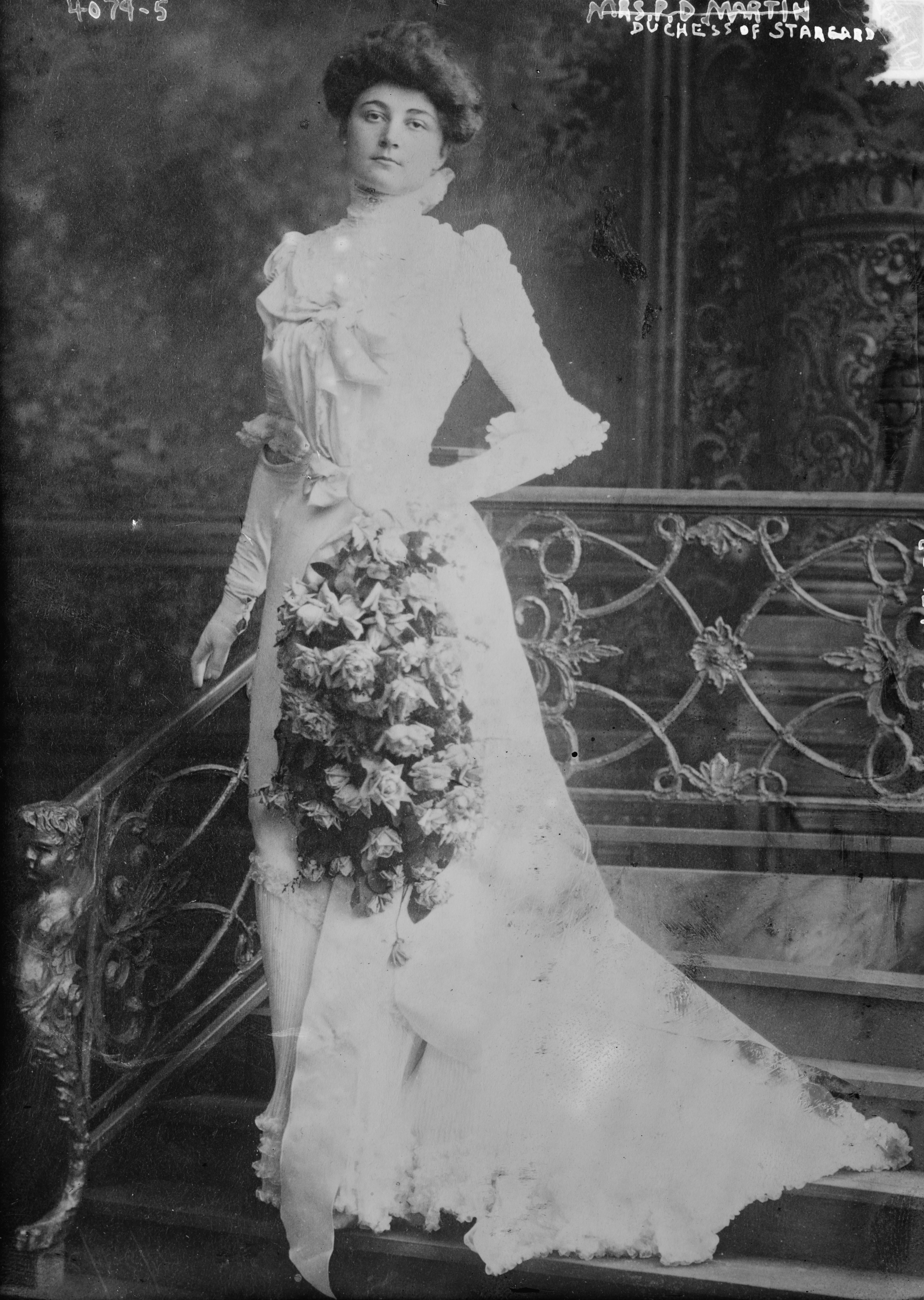
Oelrichs' eldest daughter Lily, who married Henry Borwin, Duke of Mecklenburg

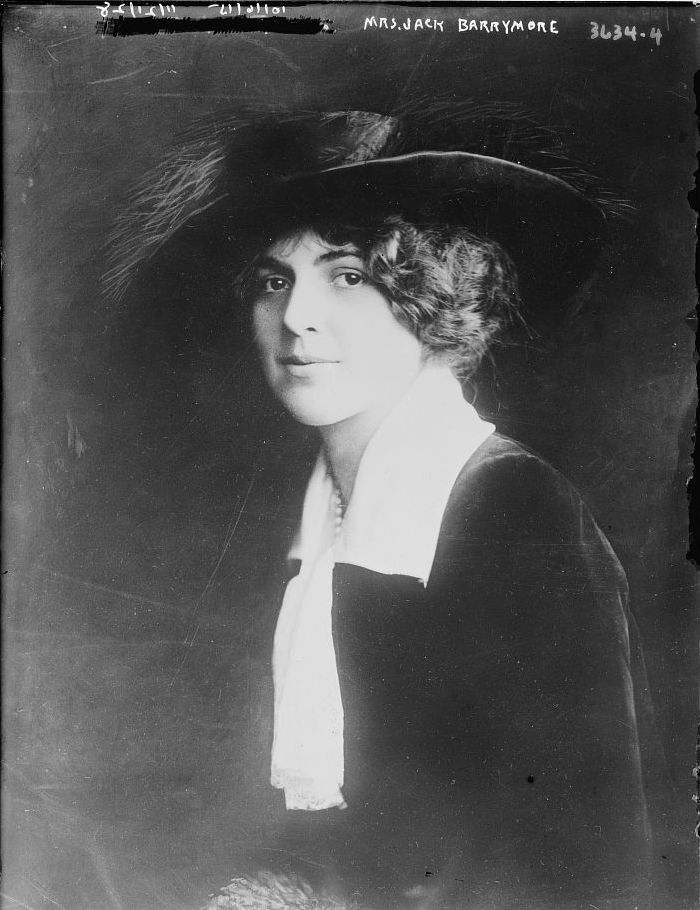
Oelrichs' daughter Blanche (Michael Strange)

Oelrichs was born on August 27, 1858, in Baltimore, Maryland. He was the son of German-born Henry Ferdinand Oelrichs (1810–1875), a senior partner in the firm of Oelrichs & Lurman, and Julia Matilda (née May) Oelrichs (1819–1879), who was born in Washington, D.C. His siblings included Hermann Oelrichs, an agent of Norddeutsche Lloyd shipping who married Theresa Alice Fair, daughter of United States Senator and Comstock Lode millionaire James Graham Fair; and Henry Oelrichs (1856–1902). Upon his older brother's death in 1906, Charles inherited the bulk of his estate.

Oelrichs was the grandson of Gesche Catharina (née Holler) Oelrichs and Johann Gerhard Oelrichs, a German merchant in Bremen. The Oelrichs came to America from Bremen around 1830. His grandfather later married a daughter of statesman Harrison Gray Otis. His maternal grandparents were Julia Matilda (née Slacum) May and Frederick May, who was a member of the May family, prominent in Virginia and Maryland during the American Revolutionary War.

== Career ==
In his youth, Charles was an amateur cowboy on a ranch near Cheyenne, Wyoming, where "he 'punched' cows, 'broke' bronchos, and lassoed bulls."

Oelrichs then entered business, becoming a member of the New York Stock Exchange with the firm E. C. Potter Co. The firm was later known as C. M. Oelrichs & Co., which was in business for sixteen years until his retirement in 1912.

=== Society life ===
In 1892, Oelrichs and his wife Blanche were included in Ward McAllister's "Four Hundred", purported to be an index of New York's best families, published in The New York Times. Conveniently, 400 was the number of people that could fit into Mrs. Astor's ballroom. Oelrichs was a member of the Union Club of the City of New York.

The family spent summers in Newport, Rhode Island, at their residence on Kay Street, amidst the Astors, the Vanderbilts, and numerous other wealthy elites of American society during the Gilded Age. The Oelrichs' were known for their lavish entertaining, including costume balls and dressing up in the "full regalia, including war paint and tomahawk".

== Personal life ==
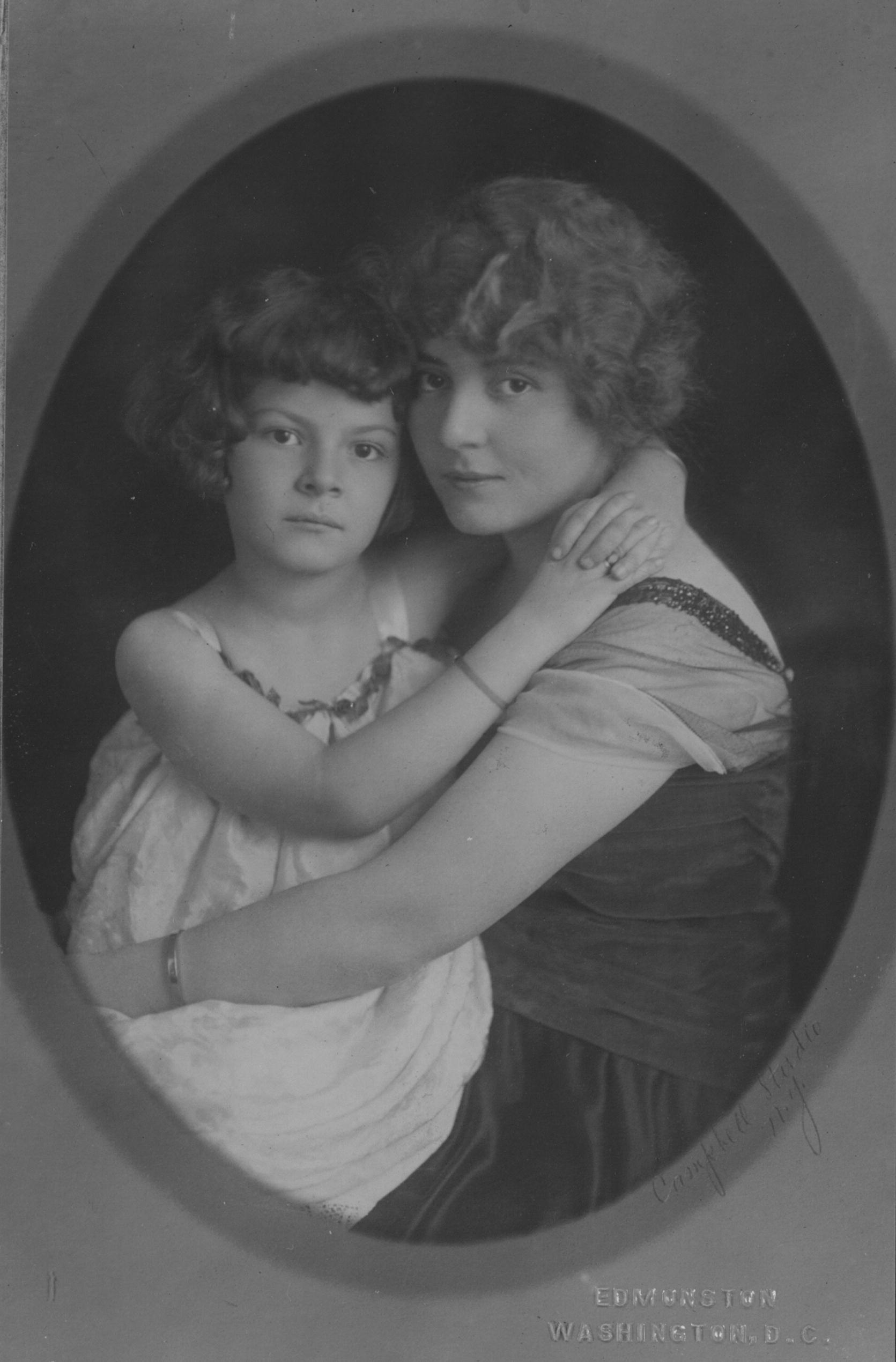
Daughter-in-law Marjorie Ramely Oelrichs and granddaughter Marjorie.

Oelrichs was married to Blanche de Loosey (1857–1932), the daughter of Chevalier Charles F. de Loosey, the Austrian Consul to New York. Blanche was also the sister of Emilie de Loosey, who was married to Theodore Havemeyer, a co-founder of the Newport Country Club. Together, the family lived in a town house on Madison Square and their summer cottage in Newport. Charles and Blanche were the parents of four children:

- Natalie "Lily" Oelrichs (1880–1931), who married polo player Peter D. Martin of San Francisco. After his death, she married Heinrich Borwin Duke of Mecklenburg (1885–1942), the son of Duke Paul Frederick of Mecklenburg and Princess Marie of Windisch-Graetz, in 1915. They divorced in 1921.
- Charles de Loosey Oelrichs (1882–1973), who married Marjorie Ramely Turnbull (1883–1952), sister of suffragist Alison Turnbull Hopkins.
- Henry Edmond Oelrichs (1883–1944), who married Esther Moreland (1890–1941).
- Blanche Marie Louise Oelrichs (1890–1950), the poet and playwright who married, and divorced, three times, to Leonard Moorhead Thomas, John Barrymore and Harrison Tweed. She also had a ten-year affair with Margaret Wise Brown.

Oelrichs died in Newport on January 15, 1932. He was buried at Woodlawn Cemetery in the Bronx. His widow died later that year.

=== Descendants ===
Through his eldest daughter, he was the grandfather of Charles Oelrichs Martin, who was disinherited by his mother after her death.

Through his son Charles, he was the grandfather of socialite Marjorie Oelrichs (1908–1937), who was married to band leader Eddy Duchin. Marjorie died six days after the 1937 birth of the couple's son, pianist and band leader Peter Oelrichs Duchin.

Through his daughter Blanche, he was the grandfather of three, including Diana Blanche Barrymore (1921–1960), who married three times (including to actors Bramwell Fletcher and Robert Wilcox) before her death which was attributed to a drug overdose.
