= Theresa Fair Oelrichs =

American socialite (1871–1926)

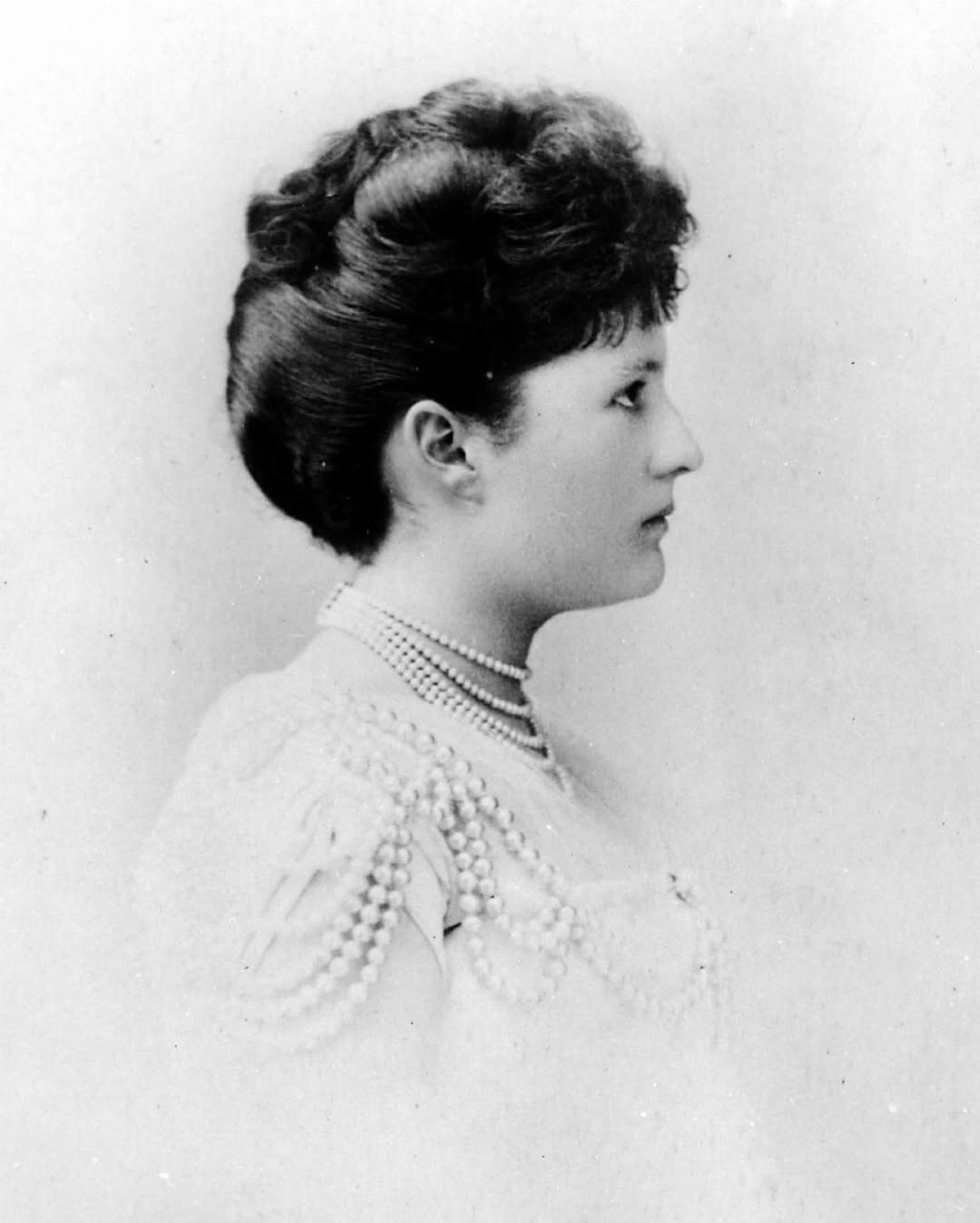
- Born: Theresa Alice Fair; June 30, 1871; Virginia City, Nevada, U.S.
- Died: November 22, 1926 (aged 55); Newport, Rhode Island, U.S.
- Spouse: Hermann Oelrichs (m. 1890; died 1906)
- Children: 1
- Parent(s): James Graham Fair; Theresa Rooney
- Relatives: Virginia Fair Vanderbilt (sister)

Theresa Alice "Tessie" Fair (June 30, 1871 – November 22, 1926) was an American socialite. She went from being the daughter of a hard-scrabble California miner to become heiress to a fortune in Comstock Lode gold and silver, the wife of steamship magnate Hermann Oelrichs, mistress of the Rosecliff estate in Newport, Rhode Island, and a member of the elite "Triumvirate" of American society."

== Early life ==
Tessie was born on June 30, 1871, in Virginia City, Nevada. Her father, James Graham Fair, was born in Clogher, County Tyrone, and immigrated to the United States from Belfast, Ireland in 1843 at age twelve. He worked the California mines until 1860, when he moved to Nevada to work the newly-discovered traces there. He met Theresa Rooney, an innkeeper's daughter, and they wed in 1861. Tessie grew up in mining camps as her father prospected for gold and was the eldest of four children born to her parents, including Virginia (nicknamed "Birdie"), Charles and James, Jr.

In 1873, her father and three partners, (Note: The four partners were John William Mackay, James Graham Fair, James C. Flood and William S. O'Brien, who were collectively known as the Bonanza Kings.) discovered the "Big Bonanza" in Virginia City, Nevada, which became the largest single deposit of gold and silver ever found. More than $100 million worth of gold ($3.9 billion in today's currency) was extracted from that mine before it was exhausted in 1898. Fair used his share to expand into railroads and real estate, generating a fortune of $50 million. Money led to a dissolute life of affairs and drinking for him, and in 1883 his wife filed for divorce, getting custody of Tessie and Virginia.

== Personal life ==
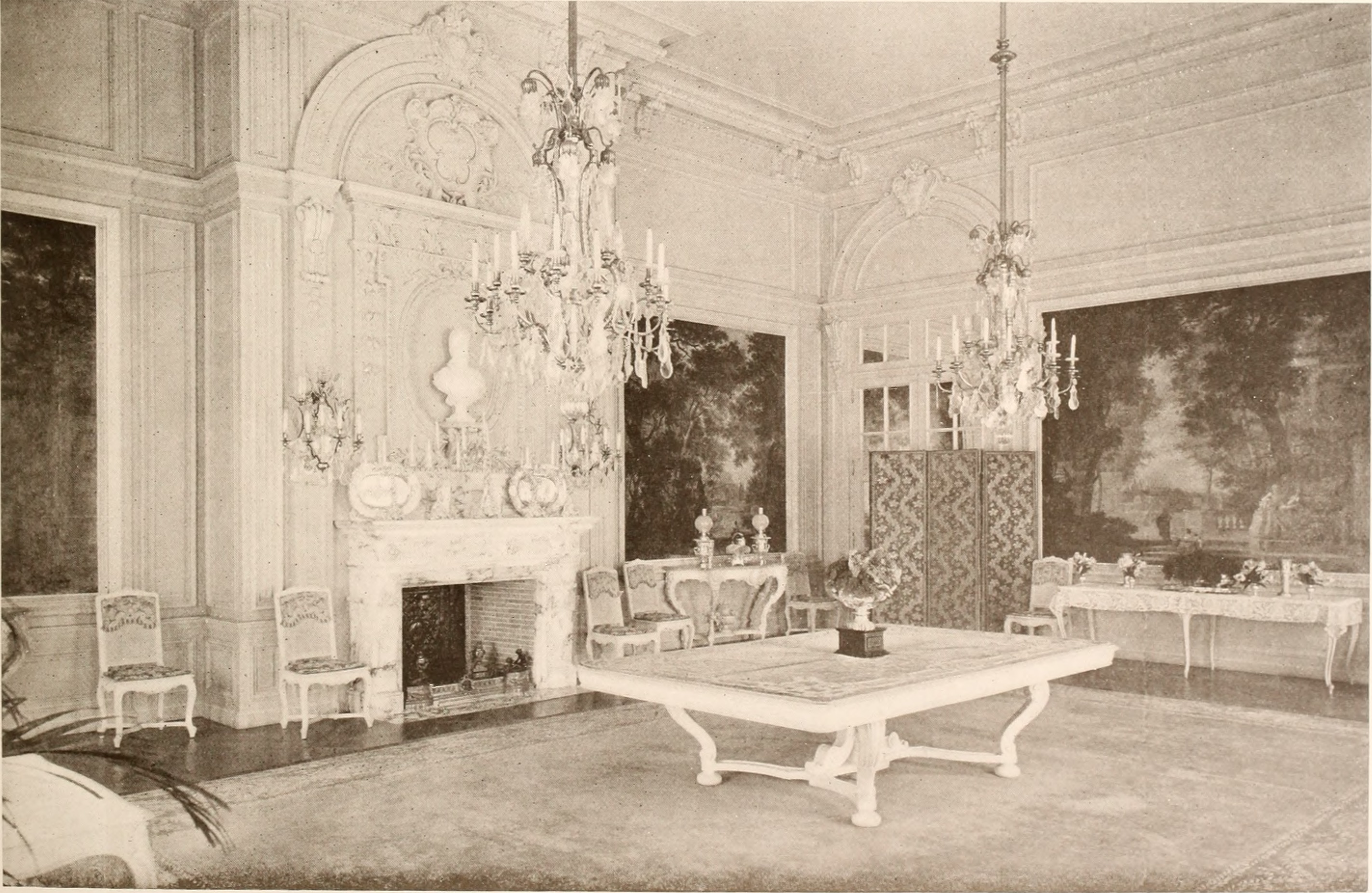
Rosecliff's dining room in the Louis XVI style, 1905.

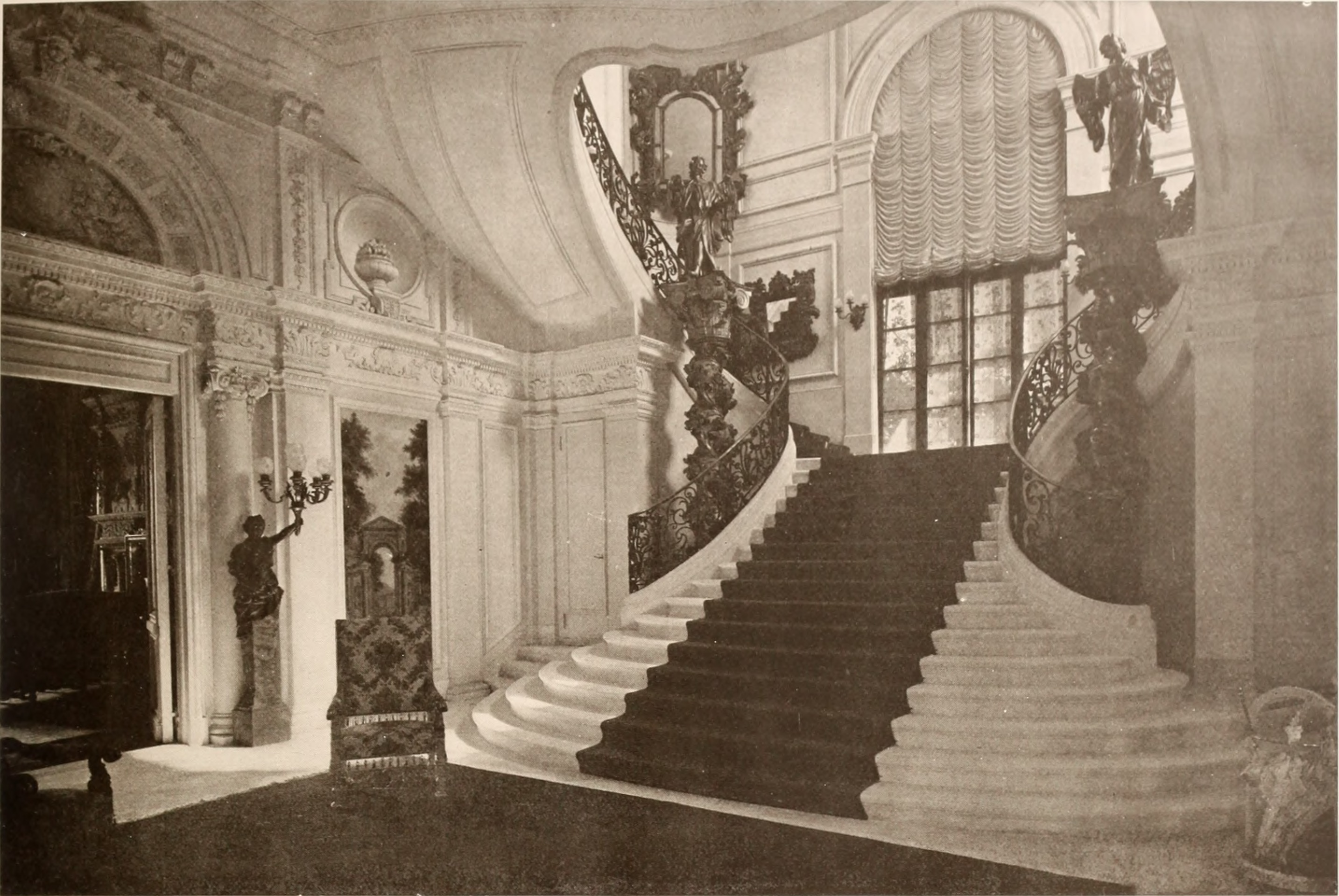
Rosecliff's staircase, 1905.

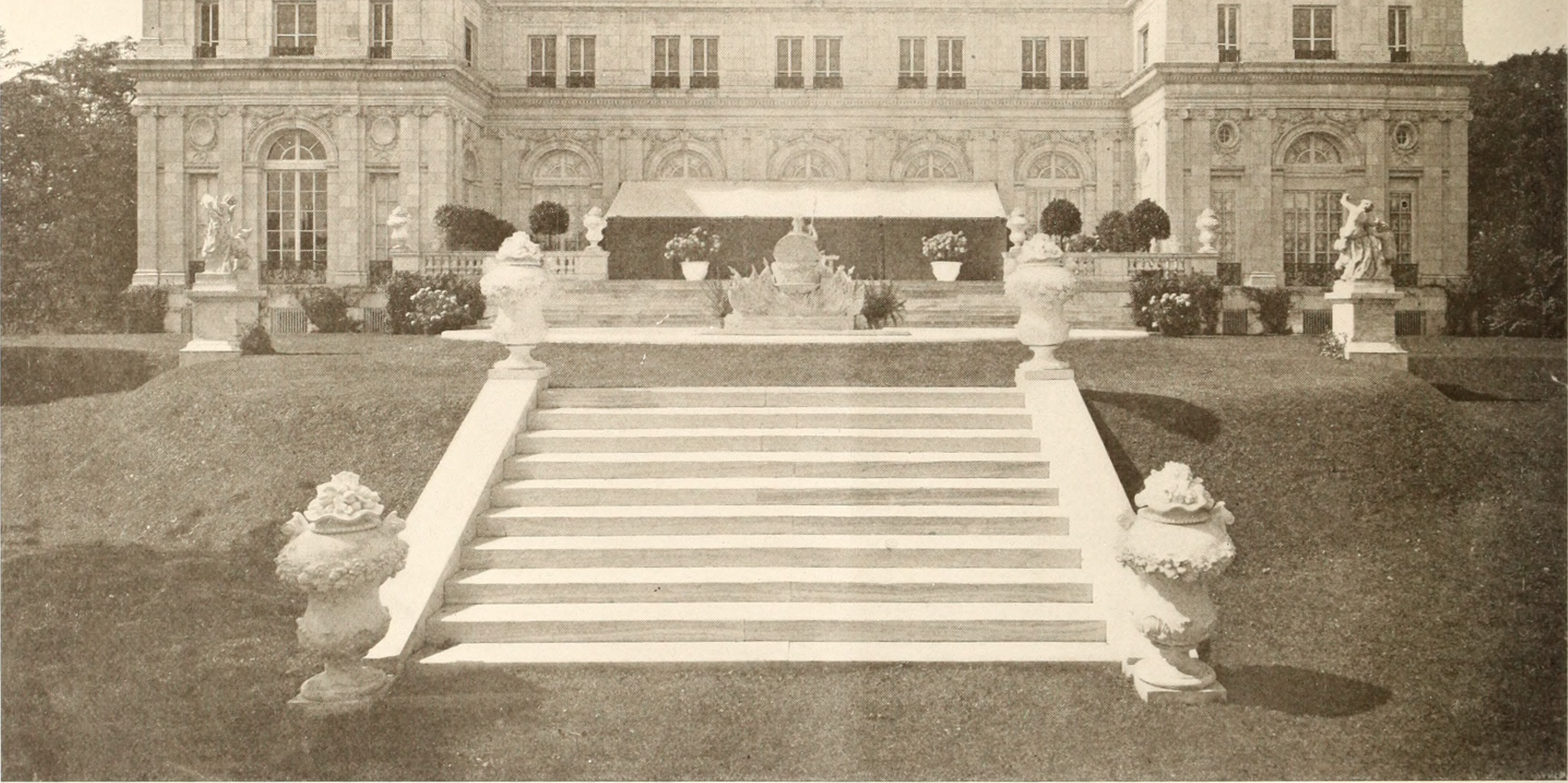
Rosecliff's rear steps.

In 1889, in Newport, Tessie met steamship tycoon Hermann Oelrichs, whom she wed the following year on June 3, 1890. The lavish wedding was held in San Francisco. James Fair's gift to his daughter was one million dollars, but even so he was not invited to the wedding. Now a wealthy heiress, Tessie moved east permanently to join the social circles of New York, Newport and Europe. Tessie later gave birth to her only child, Hermann Oelrichs, Jr. (1891–1948), who married Dorothy Haydel (1893–1961) in 1925. After his death, she married Prince Ferdinand of Liechtenstein (1901–1981) in 1950.

In New York, Hermann and Tessie Oelrichs lived at 1 East 57th Street in "the big house at the northeast corner of Fifth Avenue and Fifth-seventh Street," which was later occupied by the New York Trust Company. Tessie Oelrichs then lived at 1 East 72nd Street.

She publicly acted as a devoted and happy wife, but privately, she and Hermann were estranged. When news reached her that he survived the massive San Francisco earthquake of 1906, she hoped for a reconciliation. Hermann returned east, so she prepared a lavish supper for them together. When he did not attend, she was enraged. Unreconciled, Hermann later died of a heart attack. He left his full estate to his brother Charles May Oelrichs, thinking that Tessie would be content with her own fortune, but Tessie contested the will. Eventually, they settled the dispute and she received half of the estate.

Oelrichs died at Newport on November 22, 1926. After a funeral in the "beautiful blue and gold tapestry room" at Rosecliff, which was attended by Charles M. Oelrichs and his wife among others, she was buried at Woodlawn Cemetery, The Bronx, New York City. (Note: Her sister, Virginia Fair Vanderbilt, was buried beside her at Woodlawn after her death in 1935.) Her son inherited the vast majority of her estate with the provision that should he die without issue, her sister Virginia would be the residuary legatee. Her son later sold her stately home in 1941, and today, Rosecliff stands open to the public.

=== Society life ===
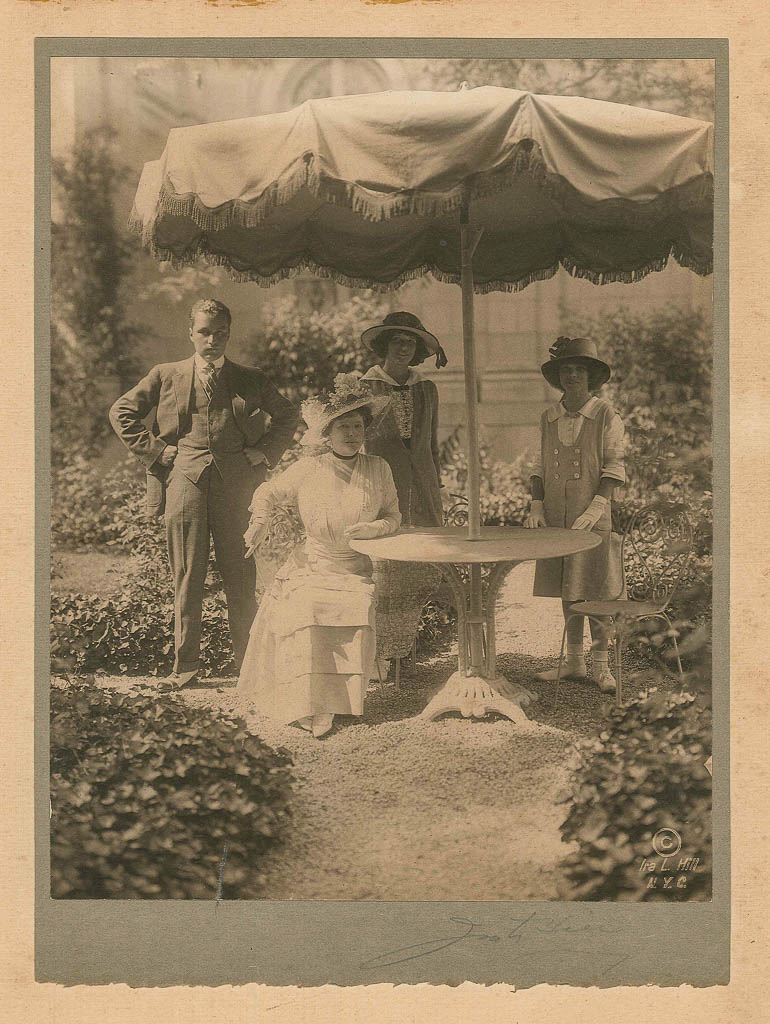
Oelrichs (seated) with her son standing on left, in 1912

Tessie's social peers, Alva Vanderbilt and Grace Vanderbilt, already had expensive mansions in Newport, which were called "summer cottages" by the elite of the day. Tessie set her sights on being mistress of her own grand estate, so she commissioned architect Stanford White to renovate their recently purchased Rosecliff on Bellevue Avenue. Begun in 1899, and purchased from the estate of George Bancroft, Rosecliff was modeled after the Grand Trianon at Versailles, and was completed in 1902 with a final cost of $2.5 million. In 1899, Tessie orchestrated a coup for the family by marrying her younger sister Birdie off to William K. Vanderbilt II, son of Alva and William K. Vanderbilt and brother of Consuelo Vanderbilt, Duchess of Marlborough, in a wedding that was extensively covered in the society pages.

After the "retirement" of Caroline Schermerhorn Astor (the "Mrs. Astor"), Tessie ruled American society as one of the so-called Triumvirate, made up of herself, Mamie Fish and Alva Belmont. Where Alva was the extravagant hostess and Mamie threw exotic and often raucous parties, Tessie was known as the martinet, the drill sergeant, of the three, enforcing the rules of polite society. Hermann's niece Blanche once described her as "strongly addicted to Society as business."
