= Duchess Marie Antoinette of Mecklenburg =

German princess from the House of Mecklenburg

Duchess Marie Antoinette
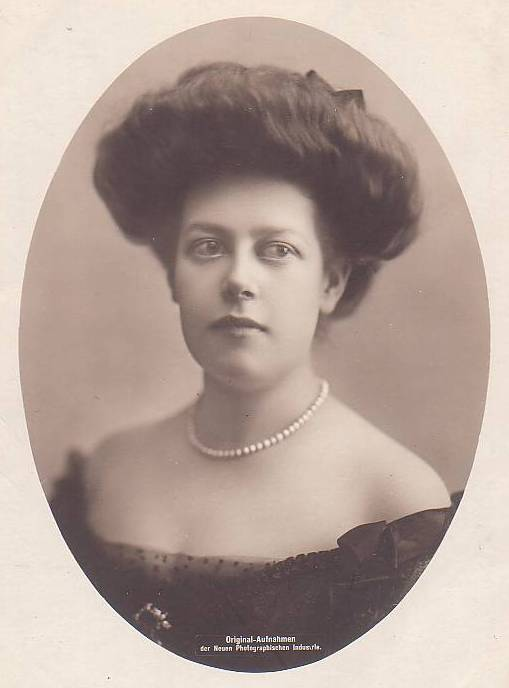
- Duchess Marie Antoinette, c. 1910
- Born: 28 May 1884; Venice, Kingdom of Italy
- Died: 26 October 1944 (aged 60); Bled, Kingdom of Yugoslavia
Names
- Marie Antoinette Margarethe Mathilde
- House: Mecklenburg-Schwerin
- Father: Duke Paul Frederick of Mecklenburg
- Mother: Princess Marie of Windisch-Graetz

Duchess Marie Antoinette of Mecklenburg-Schwerin, also Manette (Marie Antoinette Margarethe Mathilde; 28 May 1884 – 26 October 1944) was a Duchess of Mecklenburg-Schwerin by birth and potential bride for King Alfonso XIII of Spain.

== Early life ==
Marie Antoinette was born in Venice, into the House of Mecklenburg, as the third child and the second daughter of Duke Paul Frederick of Mecklenburg and Princess Marie of Windisch-Graetz. Her brothers and sisters were Duke Paul Friedrich of Mecklenburg, Duchess Maria Luise of Mecklenburg-Schwerin (1883–1883), Duke Heinrich Borwin of Mecklenburg-Schwerin (1885–1942), and Duke Joseph of Mecklenburg-Schwerin (1889–1889).

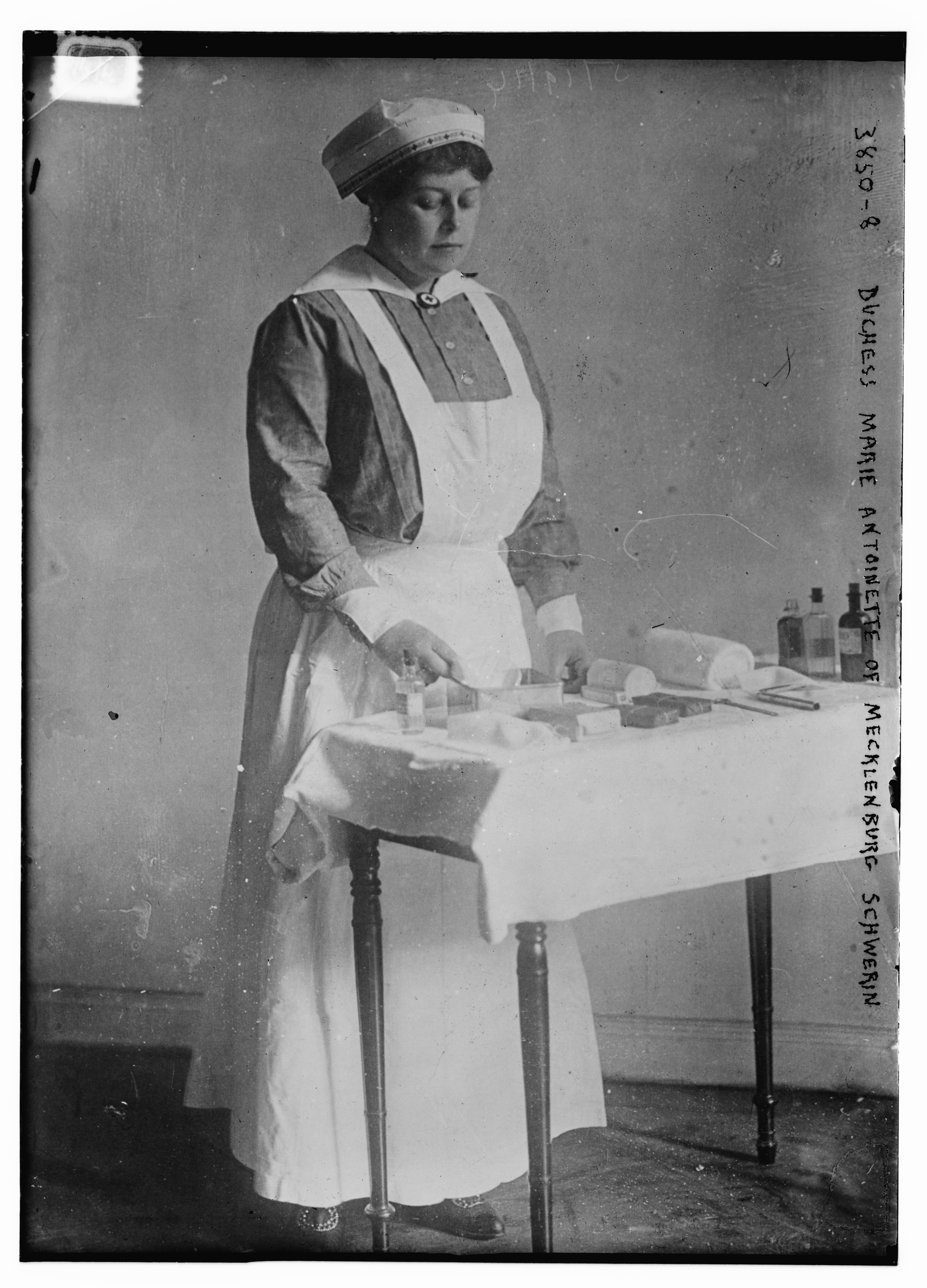
Duchess Marie Antoinette as a nurse

== Biography ==
She had a difficult relationship with her cousin Frederick Francis IV, Grand Duke of Mecklenburg-Schwerin, who regularly had to amortize her debts. So, Marie Antoinette regularly had to sell archaeological artifacts belonging to her mother, excavated in Austria and Carniola, including Hallstatt Archaeological Site in Vače. Some of these objects are still today in Harvard, Oxford and Berlin.She regularly remained in Bled with her lady in waiting Baroness Antonia Pilars de Pilar. During World War I from 1914 to 1918 they both served in several military hospitals as red cross ladies.

== Potential bride for the King of Spain ==
She was German Kaiser Wilhelm II's candidate for a bride for King Alfonso XIII of Spain although he would marry the Kaiser's maternal first cousin, Princess Victoria Eugenie, niece of British King Edward VII.

== Death ==
She died on 26 October 1944 in Bled, Yugoslavia, aged 60. She was the last of her siblings to die.

== Honours ==
- Mecklenburg: Dame's Decoration of the House Order of the Wendish Crown, in Diamonds

== Ancestry ==
Ancestors of Duchess Marie Antoinette of Mecklenburg

8. Paul Frederick, Grand Duke of Mecklenburg
4. Frederick Francis II, Grand Duke of Mecklenburg
9. Princess Alexandrine of Prussia
2. Duke Paul Frederick of Mecklenburg
10. Prince Heinrich LXIII of Reuss-Köstritz
5. Princess Augusta Reuss of Köstritz
11. Countess Eleonore of Stolberg-Wernigerode
1. Duchess Marie Antoinette of Mecklenburg
12. Weriand, Prince of Windisch-Grätz
6. Hugo, Prince of Windisch-Grätz
13. Princess Eleonore of Lobkowicz
3. Princess Marie of Windisch-Grätz
14. Paul Frederick, Grand Duke of Mecklenburg = 8
7. Duchess Luise of Mecklenburg-Schwerin
15. Princess Alexandrine of Prussia = 9
