= Oelrich =

Oelrich is a surname. Notable people with the surname include:

- Mann Oelrich (born 1938), South African politician
- Steve Oelrich (1945–2024), American law enforcement officer and politician

== See also ==
- Oelrichs (disambiguation), another surname
