= Yvonne Thomas =

American artist

- Born: 1913; Nice, France
- Died: August 7, 2009 (aged 95–96); Aspen, Colorado
- Education: Cooper Union, 1940; Art Students League, 1940; Ozenfant School of Art, 1942; Subject of the Artist School, 1948-1949
- Known for: Painting
- Movement: Abstract Expressionism

Yvonne Thomas (1913 Nice – August 7, 2009 Aspen, Colorado) was an American abstract artist.

== Education ==
She enrolled at the Art Students League in 1938, where she studied with Vaclav Vytlacil and Dmitri Romanovsky. She attended the Ozenfant School of Fine Art and studied with the French Cubist, Amandé Ozenfant. In 1948, Thomas attended the Subject of the Artists School. There she interacted with William Baziotes, David Hare, Willem de Kooning, Arshile Gorky, Adolph Gottlieb, Hans Hofmann, Lee Krasner, Robert Motherwell, Barnett Newman, Jackson Pollock, Richard Pousette-Dart, Mark Rothko, and Clyfford Still.

In 1950, Thomas studied with Hofmann at his school in Provincetown, Massachusetts. She was a member of the exclusive Artist's Club, which was only for male artists when it began in 1949.

== Exhibitions ==
In 1951, Thomas took part in the Ninth Street Exhibition of Paintings and Sculpture. Thomas was one of the few women artists to be included in all five Ninth Street shows.

Thomas' first solo exhibition occurred in 1954 at Hendler Gallery, Philadelphia. Sam Feinstein noted that Thomas seemed, "not at all concerned with the opposition of horizontals and verticals,” but instead created works consisting of “soft, curvilinear brushings harmonized into a pictorial lyricism.”

In 1955, Thomas was one of eleven artists represented in a show at the Riverside Museum, New York. She exhibited alongside Franz Kline, Milton Avery, Kenzo Okada, and Leon Polk Smith. In Howard Devree's review of the exhibition, he gave recognition to Thomas', "personal color harmonies."

In 1956, Thomas had her first solo show at Tanager Gallery. Art News commented that the works exhibited demonstrated “deliberately selected forms.”

In 1960, Thomas had her second New York show, which was held at the Esther Stuttman Gallery in New York. When Thomas had another solo exhibition in 1961, held at Galerie Agnes Lefort in Montreal. In 1962 through 1964, Thomas was featured in one-artist shows in New York; Aspen, Colorado; and East Hampton, New York. By the time her work was featured at the Rose Fried Gallery in May 1965, she had developed the more geometric and structural approach of the art in the current exhibition.

Thomas continued to paint and actively exhibit her art until the end of her life.

In 2016, she was one of the artists included in Women of Abstract Expressionism exhibition catalogue, a traveling exhibition organized by the Denver Art Museum. The accompanying catalogue, consisting of essays by several scholars, celebrated “the special contributions of women to Abstract Expressionism,” providing an “essential corrective” to what has been the “unequal accounting of women’s contributions” to the movement.

In 2023 her work was included in the exhibition Action, Gesture, Paint: Women Artists and Global Abstraction 1940-1970 at the Whitechapel Gallery in London.

Her work is in the Corcoran Gallery of Art, Fonds national d’Art Contemporain, National Gallery of Art, Washington, DC, and the Riverside Museum, New York City. Her papers are held at the Archives of American Art.

== Personal History ==
She married Leonard Thomas Jr. whose mother was the poet Blanche Oelrichs and half-sister Diana Barrymore; they had two daughters.

== Selected Collections ==
- National Gallery of Art, Washington DC
- Riverside Museum, New York
- Seattle Art Museum, Washington
