= Durelle Alexander =

American singer (1918–1994)

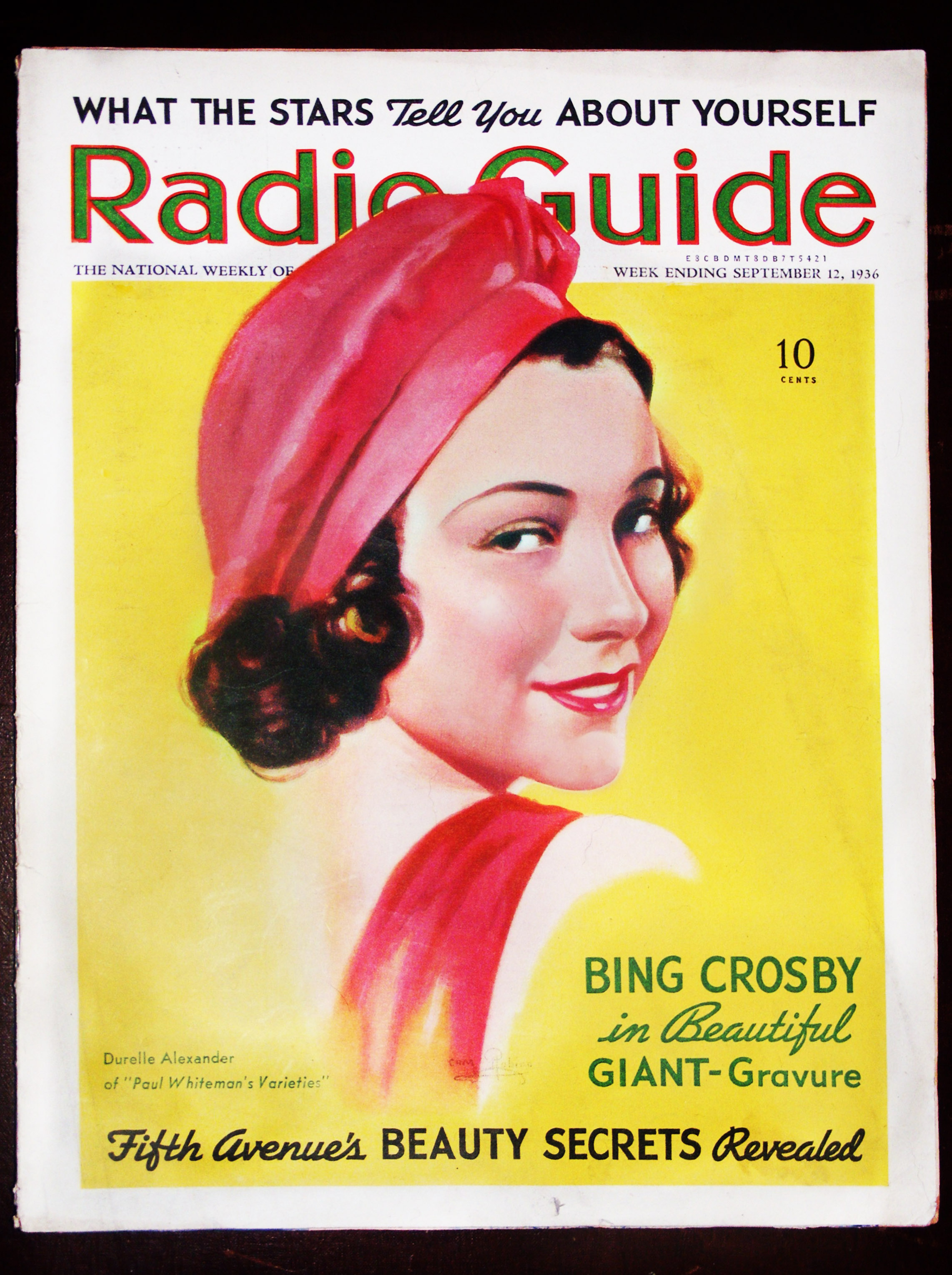
- Durelle on a 1936 Radio Guide cover
- Born: Frances Durelle Alexander; March 30, 1918; Greenville, Texas
- Died: May 21, 1994, age 76
- Spouse: Edmund Van Zandt

Durelle Alexander (March 30, 1918 - May 21, 1994) was a child performer who appeared in "Hollywood Junior Follies" and several silent "Our Gang" comedies throughout the 1920s. As an adult, she had a singing career with several big bands on radio and on tour.

== Early life ==
Alexander was born Frances Durelle Alexander in Greenville, Texas. In 1924 at the age of 6, she went with her mother to Hollywood, CA, and made appearances in several silent 'Our Gang' comedies and "Hollywood Junior Follies". She made her stage debut at age 3. A few years later, when she was 12, she moved with her mother to New York City and began singing with orchestras. By the age of 14, she signed a contract with Paul Whiteman. (Note: Don Rayno's book, Paul Whiteman: Pioneer in American Music, 1930-1967 says that Whiteman hired Alexander in 1935, which would have made her 16 or 17, depending on the time of year when she was hired.)

Alexander attended North Dallas High School.

== Career ==
By 1935, Alexander was appearing as a featured vocalist on Whiteman's radio show Paul Whiteman's Musical Varieties and Kraft Music Hall on NBC. Throughout this period, she would appear in several Radio Guide magazine articles. By September 1936, she made the cover. She later toured with the prominent big bands of Paul Whiteman, Eddy Duchin, Smith Ballew, and Archie Bleyer.

The first known recording with Alexander singing was "Animal Crackers In My Soup" with Smith Ballew and his Orchestra, recorded in July 1935. In 1936, she toured with Paul Whiteman in Billy Roses' Annual Texas Centennial.

== Marriage ==
While appearing with Whiteman in "Billy Rose's Casa Manana", a centennial celebration of Fort Worth, Texas, she met Edmund Van Zandt, grandson of the city's founders.

Alexander and Van Zandt were married in 1939, and during their 33 years of marriage, (until his death in 1972), they reared three children and lived in Venezuela, London, England, Dallas and Fort Worth, Texas.

Alexander continued to perform and moderate public affairs television programs. In 1975, she married a widowed family friend, Col. Harry Taylor Eidson, and they moved to Austin to be near their children and grandchildren.

After she began traveling with her husband on overseas trips, Alexander became interested in painting. Her works in oil and watercolors were displayed at an exhibit in Dallas, Texas, in 1965, and in 1966 she had a one-woman show in Fort Worth, Texas.

== Death ==
In May 1994, Alexander died. Memorial services were held on Memorial Day in Austin, Texas.

== Known recordings ==
- "Animal Crackers In My Soup" w/Smith Ballew and his Orch. Recorded 1935
- "When I Grow Up" from the film "Curly Top", Rex 8715 - B
- "Sugar Plum" w/Paul Whiteman and his Orch. Recorded 1935.
- "No Strings" w/Paul Whiteman and his Orch. Recorded 1935
- "I've Got A Feelin' You're Foolin'" w/Archie Bleyer and his Orch. Recorded 1935
- "On A Sunday Afternoon" w/Archie Bleyer and his Orch. Recorded 1935
- "And Then Some" w/Paul Whiteman and his Orch. Recorded 1935
- "Wah-Hoo!" w/Paul Whiteman and his Orch. Recorded 1936
- "There's A Small Hotel" w/Paul Whiteman and his Orch. Recorded 1936
- "Comes Love" w/Eddy Duchin and his Orch. Recorded 1939
- "I Must Have One More Kiss, Kiss, Kiss" w/Eddy Duchin and his Orch. Recorded 1939
