= Jimmy Maxwell (bandleader) =

American musician and bandleader (1953–2024)

- Born: August 30, 1953; New Orleans, Louisiana, U.S.
- Died: February 29, 2024 (aged 70) New Orleans, Louisiana, U.S.
- Genres: Jazz; R&B; funk
- Occupations: Musician, band leader
- Instruments: Drums, percussion, piano
- Years active: 1970s–2024
- Website: www.jimmymaxwell.com

James Maxwell (August 30, 1953 – February 29, 2024) was an American musician and bandleader who performed and conducted across the United States. He led bands at top social functions in New Orleans from 1981. From 1985 to 1989, he was partners with Peter Duchin, the famed society bandleader from New York City, and together they produced events involving sound, lighting, staging and decor.

== Early life and education ==
Maxwell was born in New Orleans, son of Edward Maxwell, who played drums with the Rene Louapre Society Orchestra from 1950 up until joining Jimmy in 1981. His mother was a professional singer. Maxwell was taken as a youngster to hear many jazz, pop and classical artists at local clubs and concert halls.

He began by studying drums and percussion at the age of 8 in the school band. By the age 12, Maxwell was studying piano with Guy Bernard, a music professor at Loyola University New Orleans. Later in his teenage years he was "band boy" for Rene' Louapre's Society Orchestra and would set the music stands, lights, and arrangements for the orchestra on a nightly basis. As well as acting as bartender for the band, he occasionally subbed on drums or piano to relieve fellow musicians.

== Career ==
By his late 20s, Maxwell had learned the business side of the music business and was leading his own band. From 1985 to 1989 he was partners with Peter Duchin, a society band leader from New York City; together they produced events involving sound, lighting, staging and decor. He appeared at the 1988 Republican National Convention, and was pictured on the front page of the New York Times with Nancy and Ronald Reagan. President George H. W. Bush later invited him to play for the first anniversary inaugural ball at the Kennedy Center with Harry Connick Jr., Tony Bennett, and Chubby Checker.

Maxwell incorporated elements of New Orleans jazz in his orchestra, but also included other styles, including R&B, "stride piano", New Orleans funk and the essence of the New Orleans groove. The band's repertoire included popular dance music from the 1900s into the 21st century.

He performed with or for Rita Moreno, Joel Grey, The 5th Dimension, The Neville Brothers, Harry Connick Sr., Hanson, Peter Duchin, Rich Little, Lou Rawls, Reba McEntire, Al Hirt, The Drifters, Pete Fountain, Diane Schuur, The Vienna Boys' Choir, Alex Donner, Presidents Ronald Reagan, George H. W. Bush, and Bill Clinton, members of Great Britain’s Royal Family (Prince & Princess Michael of York; Princess Margaret, and Prince Andrew), Bill Gates, Major Ronald Ferguson, Henry Kissinger, Colin Powell, former Supreme Court Justice Sandra Day O'Connor, Anne Rice, two-time Heavyweight Boxing Champion George Foreman and the Chicago Bulls.

== Death ==
Maxwell died in New Orleans on February 29, 2026, at the age of 70.
