= Josselin Bodley =

British artist

Josselin Reginald Courtenay Bodley (1893–1974) was an English painter who lived in France after World War I military service in Belgium, where he was wounded at the Battle of Ypres in 1915. He left the army at the rank of Captain and was awarded the Military Cross. Educated at Eton and considered one of the most promising painters of the interwar period, he was the younger son of the English civil servant, political writer, and historian John Edward Courtenay Bodley (1853–1925) and Evelyn Frances Bell, and through her a cousin of the British Arabist Gertrude Bell. Josselin's grandfather Edward Fisher Bodley (1815–1881) was a successful businessman, nonconformist minister, and justice of the peace who founded E. F. Bodley & Co., a well known Staffordshire pottery firm. His older brother Ronald Victor Courtenay Bodley, MC, (1892–1970) was a World War I hero, adventurer and journalist. His younger sister Ava Anderson, Viscountess Waverley was a well known London political and social hostess. The family descends from relatives of the 16th century English scholar and diplomat Sir Thomas Bodley, founder of the Bodleian Library at Oxford University.

Bodley painted architectural and landscape subjects and war scenes. His work combined tradition, modernism, and realism, but resisted the avantgarde trends of the time. His work was displayed at the Bernheim-Jeune Gallery, the Leicester Galleries in London, the New York gallery of Marie Norton Harriman, the Berlin gallery of Alfred Flechtheim, and the Cheltenham Art Gallery and Museum.

Later in the life, the French government made him a Chevalier of the Legion of Honor for his artistic achievements.
