= Michael Strange =

American actress and writer (1890–1950)

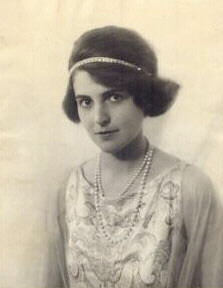
- Born: Blanche Marie Louise Oelrichs; October 1, 1890; Newport, Rhode Island, U.S.
- Died: November 5, 1950 (aged 60); Boston, Massachusetts, U.S.
- Spouses: Leonard M. Thomas (m. 1910; div. 1919) John Barrymore (m. 1920; div. 1925) Harrison Tweed (m. 1929; div. 1942)
- Partner: Margaret Wise Brown (1940- 1950)
- Children: 3, including Diana Barrymore
- Family: Barrymore

Blanche Marie Louise Oelrichs (October 1, 1890 – November 5, 1950) was an American poet, playwright, and theatre actress. Oelrichs first used the masculine pen name Michael Strange to publish her poetry in order to distance her society reputation from its sometimes erotic content, but it soon became the name under which she presented herself for the remainder of her life.

== Early life ==
Born to Charles May Oelrichs and Blanche de Loosey, Blanche Oelrichs was the youngest of four children. Her mother was Austrian, was the sister of Emilie de Loosey, who married golfer and businessman Theodore Havemeyer. The family spent summers in Newport, Rhode Island, amidst the Astors, the Vanderbilts, and numerous other wealthy elites of American society during the Gilded Age.

Her sister Natalie, always known as Lily, married polo player Peter D. Martin of San Francisco. After his premature death, Lily married and then divorced Heinrich Borwin, Duke of Mecklenburg (son of Duke Paul Frederick of Mecklenburg).

Her brother, Charles de Loosey Oelrichs, married Marjorie Ramely Turnbull, who was the sister of the suffragette Alison Turnbull Hopkins. Their daughter, Marjorie Oelrichs married bandleader Eddy Duchin.

== Life and career ==
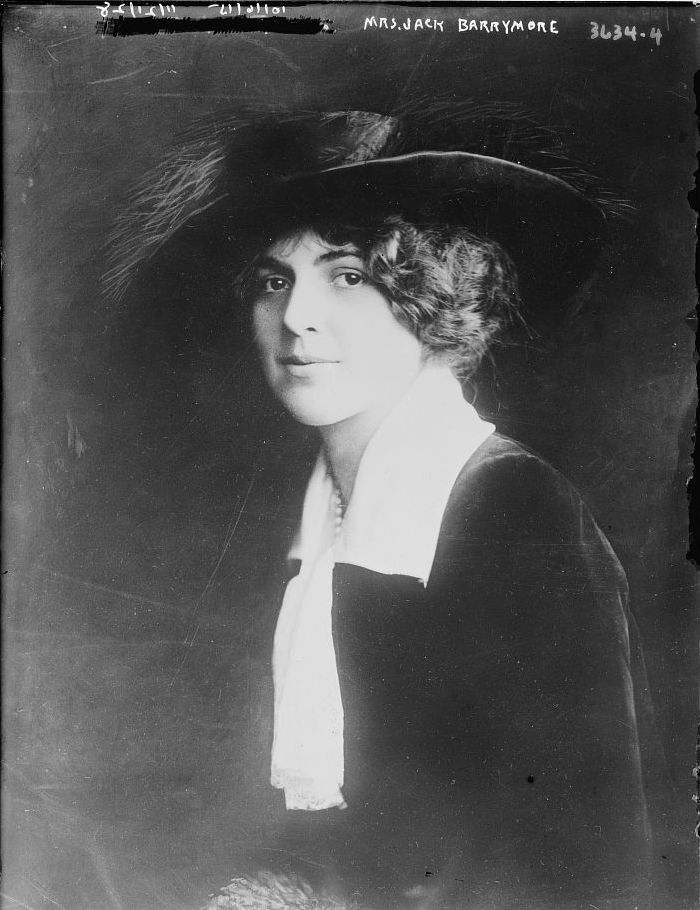
Blanche Oelrichs, between 1910 and 1915

Oelrichs was a writer and an involved activist for women's suffrage. French portrait artist Paul Helleu described Strange as the "most beautiful woman in America."

In 1910, Oelrichs married her first husband, Leonard Moorhead Thomas, the son of a prominent Philadelphia banker, with whom she had two sons, Leonard Jr. (1911–1968) and Robin May Thomas (1915–1944). Leonard Moorhead Thomas was a Yale University graduate who had worked in the diplomatic service in Rome and Madrid and served with the United States Army in Europe during World War I, earning the Croix de Guerre. Blanche Oelrichs developed a "literary urge" in 1914 when she began creating works of poetry and theatrical plays. Her first collection of poems was published in 1916 under the pen name Michael Strange. Her interests caused a rift with her husband and they divorced in 1919.

Through her social activities, Strange met popular actor, John Barrymore. They were introduced by actress Cathleen Nesbitt, Barrymore's leading woman in the 1916 production of the play Justice. She continued seeing him for four years; and, after divorcing Thomas, she married Barrymore on August 5, 1920. She was already pregnant with their only child, Diana Blanche Barrymore, who was born on March 3, 1921.

With drawings provided by John Barrymore, Strange published a book in 1921 titled Resurrecting Life. Her pseudonym was intended to separate her society family from the erotic content of the volume and its connection to her affair from Barrymore, but instead the vast popularity of the volume led to greater fame and notoriety, and her adoption of the Strange name permanently. She then turned her writing skills to the creation of theatrical plays including a 1921 Broadway production titled Clair de lune. Based on L'Homme qui rit by Victor Hugo, her play starred her husband and his sister Ethel Barrymore. It was made into a 1932 movie of the same name in France by director Henri Diamant-Berger.

In 1921, Strange was among the first to join the Lucy Stone League, an organization that fought for women to preserve their maiden names after marriage.

Strange spent a great deal of time in Paris during the next few years while her husband performed abroad. After returning to live in New York, she began acting in live theatre. Her marriage to John Barrymore ended in May 1925. She then joined a summer stock company in Salem, Massachusetts, and appeared in two Broadway plays in 1926 and 1927.

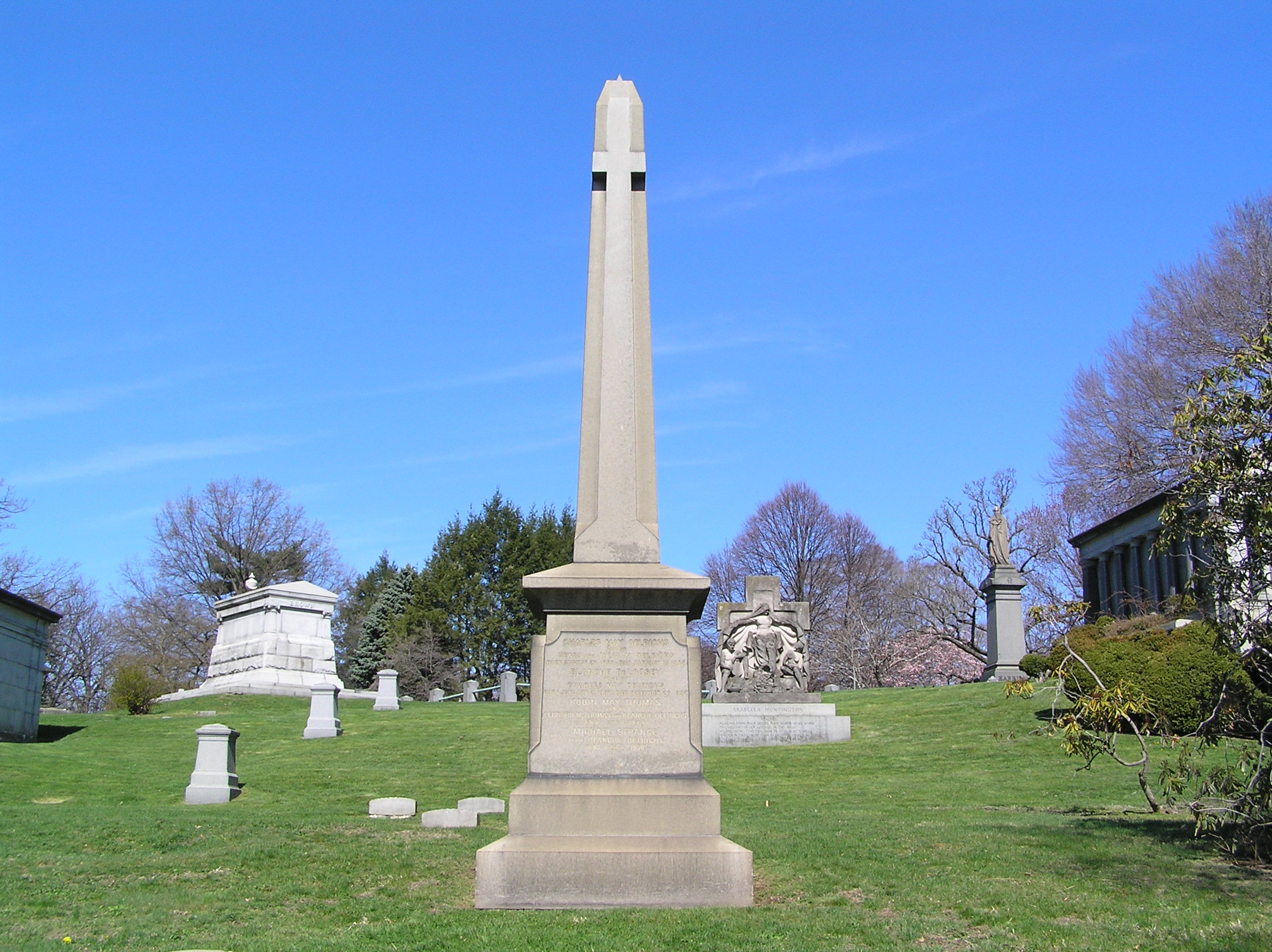
The monument of Blanche Oelrichs in Woodlawn Cemetery

Another book of Strange's poetry was published in 1928 under the title Selected poems, by Michael Strange and, the following year, she married a third time to the prominent New York attorney Harrison Tweed who later became Chairman of Sarah Lawrence College. During the second half of the 1930s, Strange hosted a poetry and music program on New York radio station WOR that gained a strong audience. In 1940, Strange published her autobiography, Who Tells Me True. In 1942, she and Harrison Tweed divorced, and in 1944, her son Robin died at the age of 29.

Starting in the summer of 1940 until her death, Strange was in a long-term relationship with Margaret Wise Brown, the author of many children's books. The relationship began as something of a mentoring one, but became a romantic relationship and they lived together at 10 Gracie Square in Manhattan beginning in 1943.

Strange was a registered communist and – until Hitler's June 1941 invasion of the Soviet Union – part of the America First Committee's weekly radio show.

Her final professional tour was Great Works with Great Music, a re-creation of a radio program she had done previously, in which she read great literature and classical works of music were played.

Michael Strange died in Boston in 1950 from leukemia. She was interred with her son Robin, who had died in 1944, in the Oelrichs family plot in Woodlawn Cemetery in The Bronx, New York. Robin had been buried in Indiana with his predeceased lover, but Strange's will asked for his body to be moved to be with the rest of the family.

Margaret Wise Brown was made Strange's literary executor. Upon Brown's death two years later, Strange's papers were delivered to Brown's sister, Roberta; she contacted Diana Barrymore, who instructed her to burn them.

== Legacy ==
In 1960, Strange's daughter, Diana Barrymore, died at age 38 after several years of drug and alcohol addiction. Her older son, Leonard, was married to painter Yvonne Thomas and they had two daughters together, the only grandchildren of Michael Strange.

In the 1950s, there was a Michael Strange Poetry Award.

== Broadway productions ==
- 1921 Clair de Lune
- 1926 Easter One Day More
- 1928 L'Aiglon

== Bibliography ==
- Miscellaneous poems by Michael Strange (1916)
- Poems, by Michael Strange (1919)
- Resurrecting Life (with drawings by John Barrymore) (1921)
- Selected poems, by Michael Strange (1928)
- Who Tells Me True (1940)
