= Hermann Oelrichs =

American businessman (1850–1906)

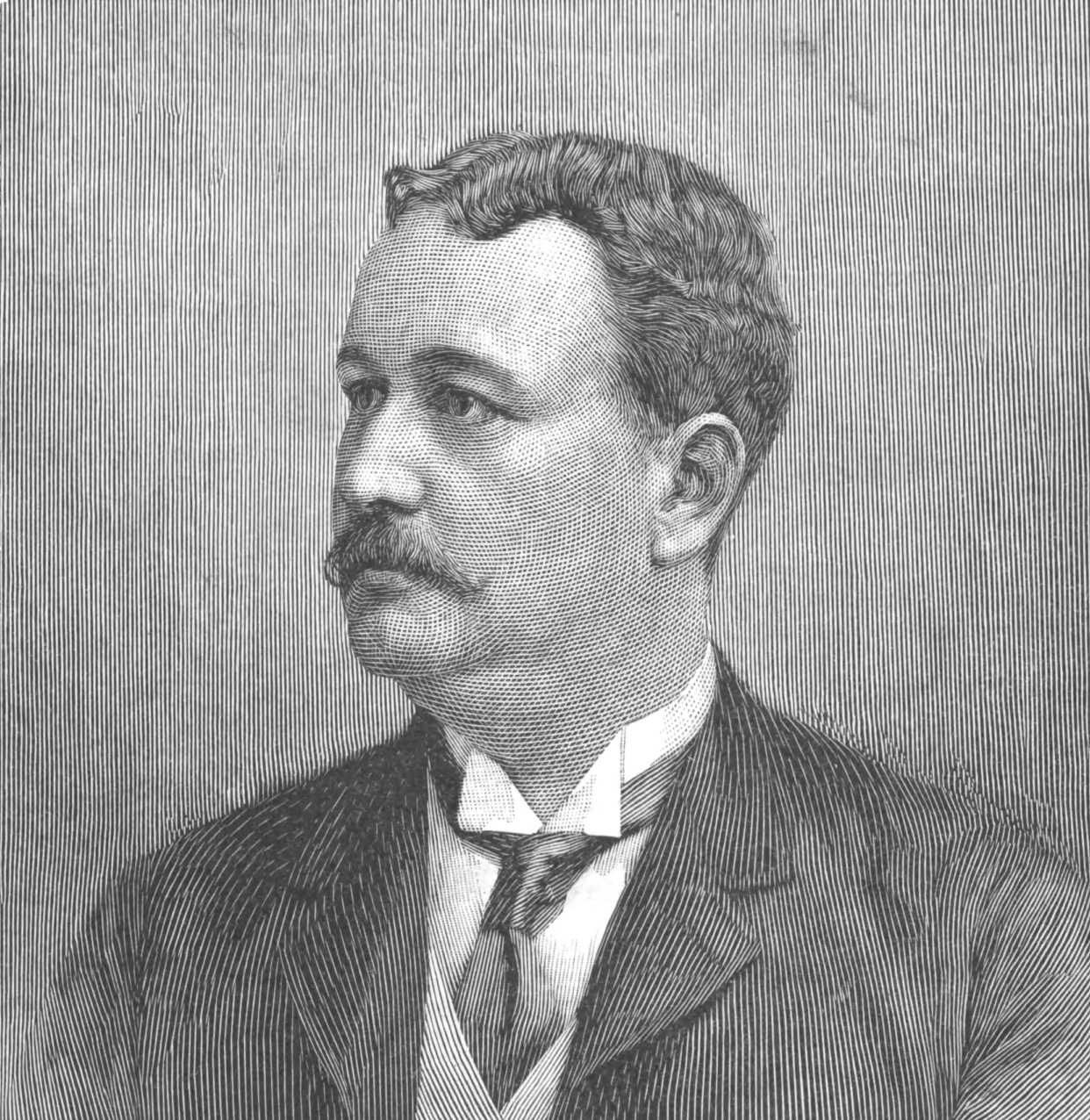
- Born: June 8, 1850; Baltimore, Maryland, U.S.
- Died: September 1, 1906 (aged 56); Aboard SS Kaiser Wilhelm der Grosse, Atlantic Ocean
- Education: Yale University
- Spouse: Theresa Alice Fair (m. 1890)
- Children: 1
- Relatives: Charles May Oelrichs (brother)

Hermann Oelrichs (June 8, 1850 – September 1, 1906) was an American businessman, multimillionaire, and worked for Norddeutsche Lloyd shipping.

== Early life ==
Oelrichs was born on June 8, 1850, in Baltimore, Maryland. He was the son of German-born Henry Ferdinand Oelrichs (1810–1875), a senior partner in the firm of Oelrichs & Lurman, and Julia Matilda (née May) Oelrichs (1819–1879), who was born in Washington, D.C. His siblings included Charles May Oelrichs (1858–1932), Henry Oelrichs (1856–1902), and Lucie Oelrichs Jay (1854–1931), wife of William Jay.

Oelrichs was the grandson of Gesche Catharina (née Holler) Oelrichs and Johann Gerhard Oelrichs, a German merchant in Bremen. The Oelrichs came to America from Bremen around 1830. His grandfather later married a daughter of statesman Harrison Gray Otis. His maternal grandparents were Julia Matilda (née Slacum) May and Frederick May, who was a member of the May family, prominent in Virginia and Maryland during the American Revolutionary War. His uncle, Henry May, was a U.S. representative from Maryland, and the father of Lilian May, who married William Bagot, 4th Baron Bagot in 1903.

He graduated from Yale University, where he was on the rowing team.

== Career ==
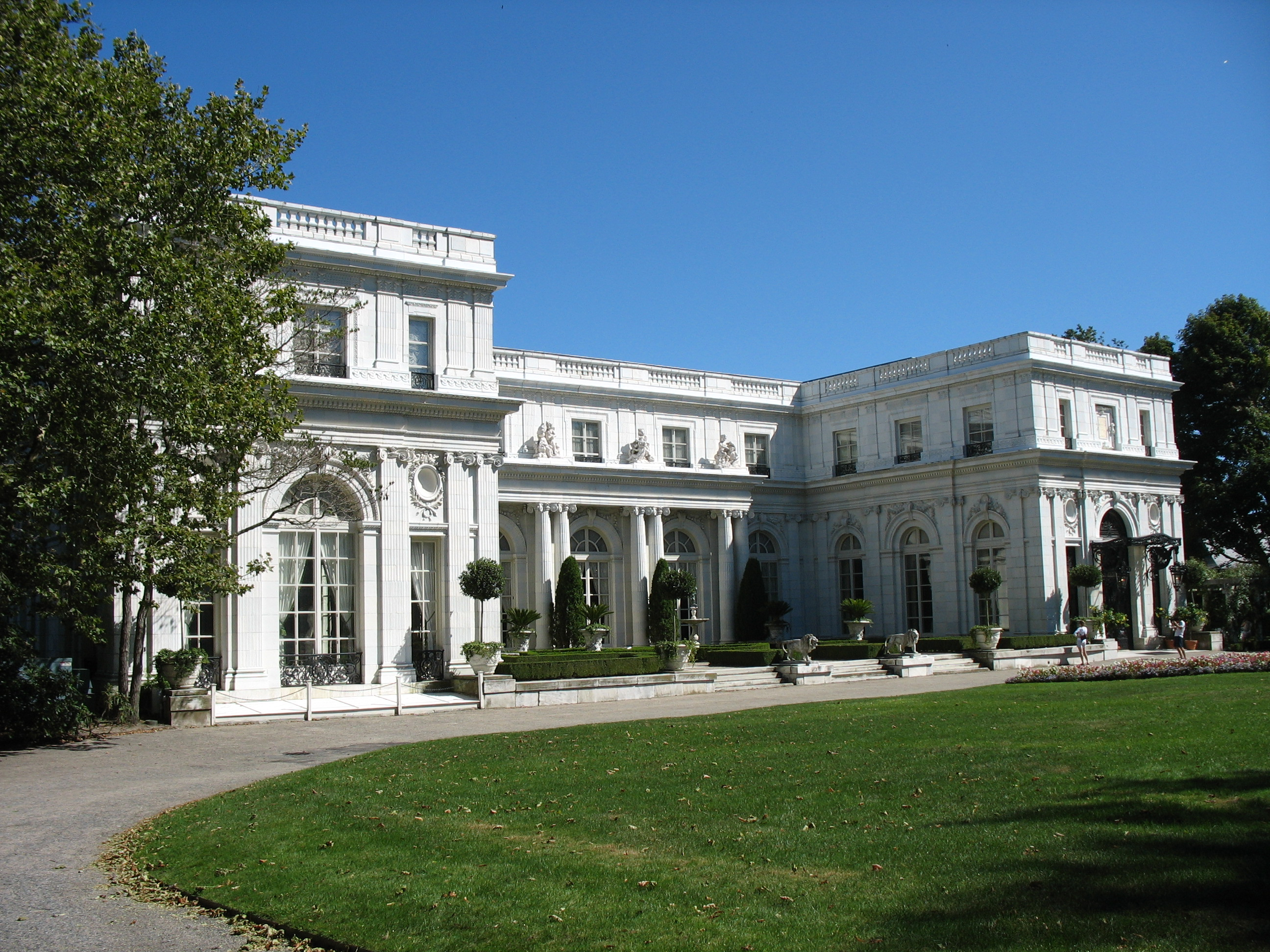
The Oelrichs' Newport estate, Rosecliff.

His firm, Oelrichs & Co., became the U.S. agent of the Norddeutsche Lloyd ("North German") shipping company.

Oelrichs was also a member of the Democratic Party and active in New York City politics, even declining to run for Mayor of New York City, before moving to San Francisco, California. The Oelrichses played a role in the rebuilding of San Francisco following the 1906 earthquake as part of the Committee of Fifty.

In the 1890s, the Oelrich's purchased Rose Cliff on Bellevue Avenue in Newport, Rhode Island, from the estate of George Bancroft and his wife commissioned architect Stanford White to build them a new residence. The resulting Rosecliff was modeled after the Grand Trianon at Versailles, and was completed in 1902 with a final cost of $2.5 million.

== Personal life ==
In 1889, the almost forty year old Oelrichs met Theresa Alice Fair ("Tessie"), daughter of United States senator and Comstock Lode millionaire James Graham Fair, while playing tennis at the Newport Casino. They married a year later in 1890. Her younger sister Birdie was married to William K. Vanderbilt II, son of Alva and William K. Vanderbilt and brother of Consuelo Vanderbilt, Duchess of Marlborough, in a wedding that was extensively covered in the society pages. In New York, they lived at 1 East 57th Street in "the big house at the northeast corner of Fifth Avenue and Fifth-seventh Street," which was later occupied by the New York Trust Company. Together, they were the parents of one child:

- Hermann Oelrichs Jr. (1891–1948), who married Dorothy Haydel (1893–1961) in 1925. After his death, she married Prince Ferdinand of Liechtenstein (1901–1981) in 1950. He served as a lieutenant (junior grade) in the U.S. Navy during the First World War.

Oelrichs died on September 1, 1906, aboard SS Kaiser Wilhelm der Grosse while sailing across the Atlantic Ocean. After his body was returned to the United States, his remains were interred in Woodlawn Cemetery in New York City. He left his full estate to his brother Charles May Oelrichs, thinking that Tessie would be content with her own fortune, but Tessie contested the will. Eventually, they settled the dispute and she received half of the estate. His widow died in Newport on November 22, 1926.

=== Sportsman ===
Oelrichs, an avid sportsman, loved polo and has been credited as "the man who brought the first mallets, polo balls and shirts into the United States." He was also the first president of the U.S. Lacrosse Association, and a director of the New York Athletic Club.
