= Duke Paul Frederick of Mecklenburg =

German royal (1852–1923)

Duke Paul Frederick
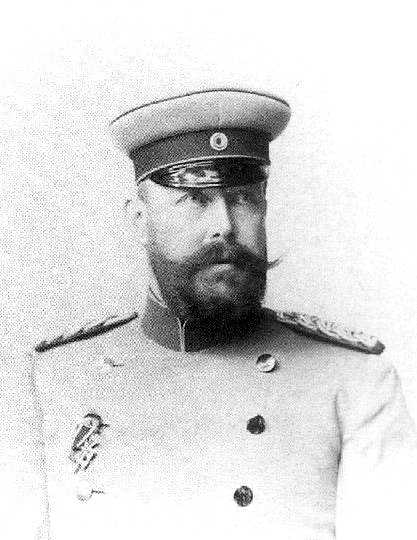
- Born: 19 September 1852; Ludwigslust
- Died: 17 May 1923 (aged 70); Ludwigslust
- Spouse: Princess Marie of Windisch-Graetz (m. 1881)
- Issue: Duke Paul Friedrich; Duchess Marie Louise; Duchess Marie Antoinette; Duke Henry Borwin; Duke Joseph
- House: House of Mecklenburg-Schwerin
- Father: Frederick Francis II, Grand Duke of Mecklenburg-Schwerin
- Mother: Princess Augusta Reuss of Köstritz
- Religion: Lutheranism, after 1897 Roman Catholicism

Duke Paul Frederick of Mecklenburg (German: Herzog Paul Friedrich zu Mecklenburg; 19 September 1852 – 17 May 1923) was a member of the House of Mecklenburg-Schwerin and general of the Mecklenburg cavalry.

== Life ==
Duke Paul Frederick was born in Ludwigslust Castle as the second eldest son of Frederick Francis II, Grand Duke of Mecklenburg-Schwerin and his first wife Princess Augusta Reuss of Köstritz, the daughter of Prince Henry LXIII Reuss of Köstritz.

Duke Paul Frederick married in Schwerin on 5 May 1881 his cousin, the Austrian born Princess Marie of Windisch-Graetz, the daughter of Prince Hugo of Windisch-Graetz and his wife Duchess Louise of Mecklenburg-Schwerin. The couple who had five children who were all raised Roman Catholic, the religion of Princess Marie, lived a quiet life in Venice. While in Venice the family befriended Cardinal Sarto (later Pope Pius X) who often visited the family and acted as a spiritual advisor for them.

On 21 April 1884 Duke Paul Frederick renounced his and his sons rights of succession to Mecklenburg-Schwerin in favour of his younger brothers and their sons, so they would take precedence over him and his. In 1887, Duke Paul Fredrick, raised a Lutheran, decided to convert to Roman Catholicism the religion of his wife and children.

In 1906 after upsetting his nephew Frederick Francis IV, Grand Duke of Mecklenburg-Schwerin, over the amount of money that he was spending Duke Paul Frederick and his wife were ordered to submit to the controller of the royal household.

Duke Paul Frederick died in Ludwigslust, where he and his wife are both buried in the Louisenkapelle.

== Issue ==
- HH Duke Paul Friedrich of Mecklenburg (1882–1904)
- HH Duchess Maria Luise of Mecklenburg (1883–1883)
- HH Duchess Marie Antoinette of Mecklenburg (1884–1944) married to Pavel Rafailovich Bermondt-Avalov, the marriage is childless.
- HH Duke Henry Borwin of Mecklenburg (1885–1942). Although his father had renounced his dynastic obligations, his right to marry a spouse of his choice (or a commoner) was not recognized and his two first marriages were unlawful (with no right to share his title) in Mecklenburg and the last one considered morganatic:
  - 1. Elizabeth Tibbits Pratt (1860–1928), widow of Amédée De Gasquet-James of New Orleans; married in Dover, on 15 June 1911 and divorced in April 1913;
  - 2. Natalie Oelrichs (1880–1931), widow of polo player Peter D. Martin of San Francisco, daughter of Charles May Oelrichs and sister of Blanche Oelrichs; married in 1915 and divorced in 1921. She was also known as the Duchess of Stargard.
  - 3. Carola von Alers (1882–1974), daughter of Wilhelm von Alers and Adelaide von Chamisso de Boncourt; married in 1921.
- HH Duke Joseph of Mecklenburg (1889–1889)

== Title, style and honours ==
=== Title & style ===
- 19 September 1852 – 17 May 1923: His Highness Duke Paul Frederick of Mecklenburg

=== Honours ===
German decorations

- Mecklenburg:
  - Grand Cross of the Wendish Crown, with Collar and Crown in Ore
  - Grand Cross of the Griffon
  - Memorial Medal for Grand Duke Frederick Francis III
  - Military Merit Cross (Schwerin)
  - Cross for Distinction in War (Strelitz)
- Bavaria: Knight of St. Hubert, 1912
- (Saxe-Coburg and Gotha) (Duchy of Saxe-Altenburg) (Saxe-Meiningen) Ernestine duchies: Grand Cross of the Saxe-Ernestine House Order, with Swords
- Hesse-Darmstadt: Grand Cross of the Ludwig Order, 12 October 1864
- Oldenburg: Grand Cross of the Order of Duke Peter Friedrich Ludwig, with Collar and Golden Crown
- Saxe-Weimar-Eisenach: Grand Cross of the White Falcon, 1876
- Prussia:
  - Knight of the Black Eagle, 29 August 1879; with Collar, 1880
  - Grand Cross of the Red Eagle
  - Iron Cross, 2nd Class
  - Commemorative Medal for 1863
  - German War Memorial Medal for 1870/71
- Saxony: Knight of the Rue Crown
- Schaumburg-Lippe: Military Merit Medal

Foreign decorations

- Austria-Hungary: Grand Cross of St. Stephen, 1915
- Denmark: Knight of the Elephant, 3 August 1904
- Principality of Montenegro: Grand Cross of the Order of Prince Danilo I
- Ottoman Empire:
  - Grand Cordon of the Order of Glory
  - Order of Osmanieh, 1st Class
- Kingdom of Portugal: Grand Cross of the Tower and Sword, with Collar
- Russian Empire:
  - Knight of St. Andrew
  - Knight of St. Alexander Nevsky
  - Knight of the White Eagle
  - Knight of St. Anna, 1st Class
  - Knight of St. Stanislaus, 1st Class
  - Knight of St. George, 4th Class

== Ancestry ==
Ancestors of Duke Paul Frederick of Mecklenburg

8. Friedrich Ludwig, Hereditary Grand Duke of Mecklenburg-Schwerin
4. Paul Frederick, Grand Duke of Mecklenburg
9. Grand Duchess Elena Pavlovna of Russia
2. Frederick Francis II, Grand Duke of Mecklenburg
10. Frederick William III of Prussia
5. Princess Alexandrine of Prussia
11. Louise of Mecklenburg-Strelitz
1. Duke Paul Fredrick of Mecklenburg
12. Prince Heinrich XLIV Reuss of Köstritz
6. Prince Heinrich LXIII Reuss of Köstritz
13. Baroness Wilhelmine of Geuder genannt Rabensteiner
3. Princess Augusta Reuss of Köstritz
14. Count Heinrich of Stolberg-Wernigerode
7. Countess Eleonore of Stolberg-Wernigerode
15. Princess Jenny of Schonburg-Waldenburg
