= Marjorie Oelrichs =

American socialite (1908–1937)

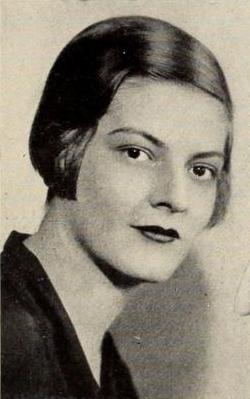
- Oelrichs in the 1930s
- Born: Marjorie de Loosey Oelrichs; June 23, 1908
- Died: August 3, 1937 (aged 29); New York City, U.S.
- Other name: "Bubbles"
- Spouse: Eddy Duchin (m. 1935)
- Children: Peter Duchin
- Relatives: Charles May Oelrichs (paternal grandfather); Alison Turnbull Hopkins (maternal aunt); Michael Strange (paternal aunt)

Marjorie de Loosey Oelrichs Duchin (June 23, 1908 – August 3, 1937) was an American socialite.

== Early life ==
Born on June 23, 1908, she was the daughter of Marjorie Ramely Oelrichs (née Turnbull; 1883–1952) and Charles de Loosey Oelrichs (1882–1973). After her parents divorce, her father remarried to Madeleine Lucienne Meyer, a daughter of Millius Pierre Meyer, in 1926.

Her paternal grandparents were the former Blanche de Loosey and Charles May Oelrichs, a wealthy broker who was prominent in New York society during the Gilded Age. Her maternal grandparents were Lt. Commander Frank Turnbull, a retired naval officer, and his wife, the former Marion Louise Bates, descendant of William Bradford, a governor of Plymouth Colony in the 17th century. A maternal aunt was suffragist Alison Turnbull Hopkins. Her paternal aunt was poet and playwright Michael Strange.

== Professional life and marriage ==
A well-known New York and Newport beauty, she was described by Vogue as having "waxen skin and eyebrows like butterflies." An Edward Steichen photograph of Oelrichs was included in an advertisement for Pond's cold cream in a 1926 copy of Ladies' Home Journal.

She became the wife of dance bandleader Eddy Duchin after the two met at the Waldorf-Astoria; they married at her mother's apartment at the Hotel Pierre on June 5, 1935, officiated by Judge Vincent Lippe. When she was removed from the New York Social Register for marrying Duchin because he was Jewish, her reaction was reportedly "Who cares? It's just a phone book."

Oelrichs died on August 3, 1937, in the Harbor Sanitarium at 667 Madison Avenue, just six days after the birth of the couple's son, Peter Oelrichs Duchin. After his father's death in 1951, Peter Duchin was raised by close family friends: statesman W. Averell Harriman and his wife, Marie Norton Harriman.

== In popular culture ==
Kim Novak portrayed Oelrichs in the 1956 biopic The Eddy Duchin Story with Tyrone Power as Duchin.
