= Duke Paul Frederick of Mecklenburg (1882–1904) =

German soldier and sailor

Duke Paul Frederick
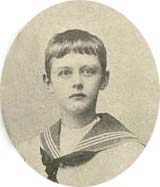
- Photo of Duke Paul Frederick of Mecklenburg-Schwerin
- Born: 12 May 1882; Schwerin, German Empire
- Died: 21 May 1904 (aged 22); Kiel, German Empire
Names
- Paul Frederick Charles Alexander Michael Hugh
- House: Mecklenburg-Schwerin
- Father: Duke Paul Frederick of Mecklenburg
- Mother: Princess Marie of Windisch-Graetz

Duke Paul Frederick of Mecklenburg (German: Herzog Paul Friedrich zu Mecklenburg; given names: Paul Frederick Charles Alexander Michael Hugh; 12 May 1882 – 21 May 1904) was a member of the House of Mecklenburg-Schwerin and a German soldier and sailor. He was styled His Highness Duke Paul Frederick of Mecklenburg.

== German soldier and sailor ==
Duke Paul Frederick Charles Alexander Michael Hugh of Mecklenburg was born in Schwerin, the eldest child of Duke Paul Frederick of Mecklenburg and his Austrian wife, Princess Marie of Windisch-Graetz. Duke Paul Frederick was a grandson of Frederick Francis II, Grand Duke of Mecklenburg. Shortly after his birth he became the youngest soldier in the world when he was admitted as a soldier into the German Imperial Army and assigned to the 15th Mecklenburg Dragoons by Emperor William I. Duke Paul Frederick and his siblings were raised as Roman Catholics and were brought up in Venice, where his family became friends with Cardinal Sarto (later Pope Pius X), who was a regular visitor to the family.

On 21 April 1884 Duke Paul Frederick's place in the line of succession to the throne of Mecklenburg-Schwerin was superseded by his uncles after his father renounced his own and his descendants' rights of succession. However, in the event of his uncles' families becoming extinct, Duke Paul Frederick's line could succeed, as long as the successor converted from Roman Catholicism to Protestantism.

Despite being put into the Army shortly after his birth, Duke Paul Frederick eventually pursued a career in the German Imperial Navy. He rose to the rank of lieutenant and in 1902, while serving on the training ship SMS Charlotte, crossed the Atlantic to visit the United States of America and cruise in the Southern waters of the country.

== Death ==
Duke Paul Frederick of Mecklenburg died unmarried in Kiel at the age of 22. He had hanged himself in his bedroom, naked while wearing a blonde wig. It is unknown if his death was accidental, or intentional.

== Ancestry ==
Ancestors of Duke Paul Frederick of Mecklenburg (1882–1904)

16. Frederick Louis, Hereditary Grand Duke of Mecklenburg-Schwerin
8. Paul Frederick, Grand Duke of Mecklenburg
17. Grand Duchess Elena Pavlovna of Russia
4. Frederick Francis II, Grand Duke of Mecklenburg
18. Frederick William III of Prussia
9. Princess Alexandrine of Prussia
19. Louise of Mecklenburg-Strelitz
2. Duke Paul Frederick of Mecklenburg
20. Prince Heinrich XLIV Reuss of Köstritz
10. Prince Heinrich LXIII of Reuss-Köstritz
21. Baroness Wilhelmine of Geuder genannt Rabensteiner
5. Princess Augusta Reuss of Köstritz
22. Count Heinrich of Stolberg-Wernigerode
11. Countess Eleonore of Stolberg-Wernigerode
23. Princess Jenny of Schönburg-Waldenburg
1. Duke Paul Frederick of Mecklenburg
24. Joseph, Count of Windisch-Grätz
12. Weriand, Prince of Windisch-Grätz
25. Princess Léopoldine of Arenberg
6. Hugo, Prince of Windisch-Grätz
26. Joseph, Prince of Lobkowicz
13. Princess Eleonore of Lobkowicz
27. Princess Caroline of Schwarzenberg
3. Princess Marie of Windisch-Grätz
28. Frederick Louis, Hereditary Grand Duke of Mecklenburg-Schwerin = 16
14. Paul Frederick, Grand Duke of Mecklenburg = 8
29. Grand Duchess Elena Pavlovna of Russia = 17
7. Duchess Luise of Mecklenburg-Schwerin
30. Frederick William III of Prussia = 18
15. Princess Alexandrine of Prussia = 9
31. Louise of Mecklenburg-Strelitz = 19
