= Peter Duchin =

American pianist and band leader

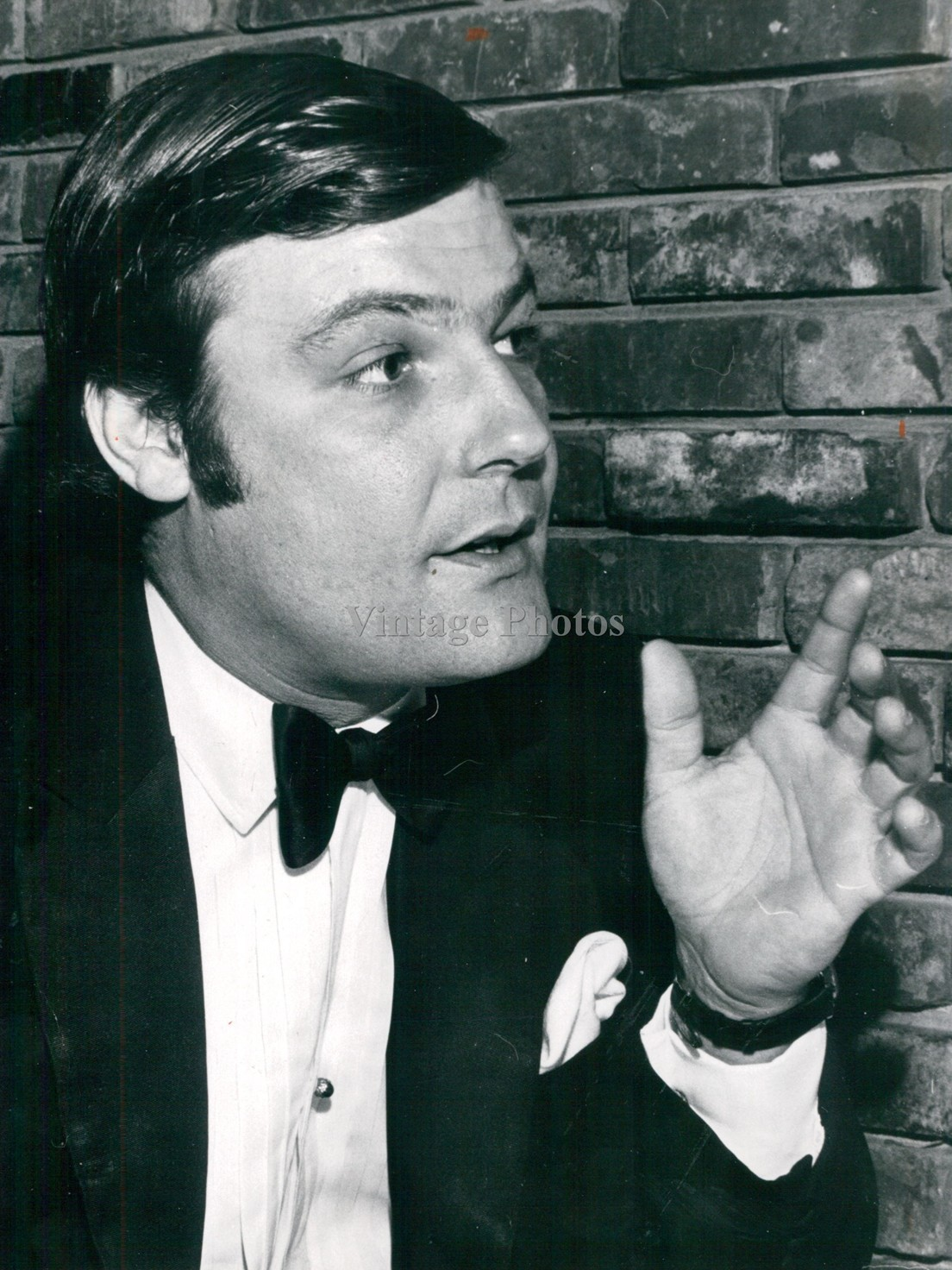
- Duchin in 1971
- Born: Peter Oelrichs Duchin; July 28, 1937 (age 88); New York City, NY, U.S.
- Occupations: Pianist, band leader
- Years active: 1963–present
- Spouses: Cheray Georgea Zauderer (m. 1964; div. 1982) Brooke Hayward (m. 1985; div. 2011) Virginia Coleman (m. 2012)
- Children: 3
- Parent(s): Eddy Duchin; Marjorie Oelrichs

Peter Oelrichs Duchin (born July 28, 1937) is an American pianist and band leader.

== Early life and education ==
Duchin was born in New York City, the son of pianist and band leader Eddy Duchin. His mother was Marjorie Oelrichs, a Newport, Rhode Island and New York City socialite who died unexpectedly when he was just five days old. She had been removed from the New York Social Register for marrying Duchin's father because Eddy Duchin was Jewish; her reaction was reportedly "Who cares? It's just a phone book." After the death of both of his parents he was raised by close family friends, statesman W. Averell Harriman and his wife, Marie Norton Harriman.

Duchin was educated at Eaglebrook School (where he studied piano with Carrie Barbour Swift) and The Hotchkiss School prep schools in New England. He spent time in Paris, France and studied at the Sorbonne before returning home and graduating from Yale University.

== Career ==
Duchin formed his first professional band, which played the St. Regis Hotel in New York City, in 1962 thanks in part to his family name and the networking it had made possible. The band's style and genres have been described as "a musical approach that incorporates big bands, swing and Broadway songs (and nowadays, old-fashioned rock 'n' roll)."

Duchin's music was much heard on middle of the road radio in the late 1960s and early 1970s from albums and singles released on the Decca, Bell and Capitol labels. His single "Star Dust" reached No. 143 in the Cashbox survey, 1964.

Also in 1964, Duchin made his acting debut in the film The World of Henry Orient, which also featured Peter Sellers, Angela Lansbury, Tom Bosley, and Phyllis Thaxter, among others.

From 1985 to 1989, Duchin had a professional partnership with Jimmy Maxwell, leader of the traditional society jazz band in New Orleans.

By 2009, Duchin's band had played at an estimated 6,000 performances.

Duchin is an honorary member and former Vice-Chairman of the New York State Council on the Arts. He has served on the boards of American Ballet Theatre, Carnegie Hall, Spoleto Festival USA, The Chamber Music Society of Lincoln Center, the board of Trustees for the Glimmerglass Opera of Cooperstown, New York, the Advisory Council for the American Russian Youth Orchestra, the National Jazz Service Organization, the World Policy Institute, and the Citizens Committee For New York City.

He was also a board member for The Center for Arts Education.

== Recordings ==
Duchin recorded for the following recording companies: Decca Records, Bell Records and Capitol Records.

== Personal life ==
In 1964, he married Cheray Zauderer, a divorced Manhattan socialite with whom he eventually had three children. As a wedding gift, her father gave them a Thoroughbred yearling named Mr. Right. The colt became one of only four racehorses to win both the U.S. West Coast's Santa Anita Handicap and the East Coast's Woodward Stakes.

After his divorce from Zauderer, in 1985 Duchin married Brooke Hayward, with whom he had been living since 1981. The couple maintained a loft in New York City and a house in Washington, Connecticut in Litchfield County, Connecticut. In 1996 he published his memoir, Ghost of a Chance. In 2008 Hayward and Duchin announced their separation, and they eventually divorced.

Duchin married Virginia Coleman over the 2012 Memorial Day weekend in East Hampton.

== Bibliography ==
- Duchin, Peter, Ghost of a Chance: A Memoir (1996), Random House, ISBN 978-0-679-41418-6
- Duchin, Peter; Beard, Patricia Face the Music: A Memoir (2021), Doubleday Books, ISBN 9780385545877
