= Alison Turnbull Hopkins =

American suffrage activist (1880–1951)

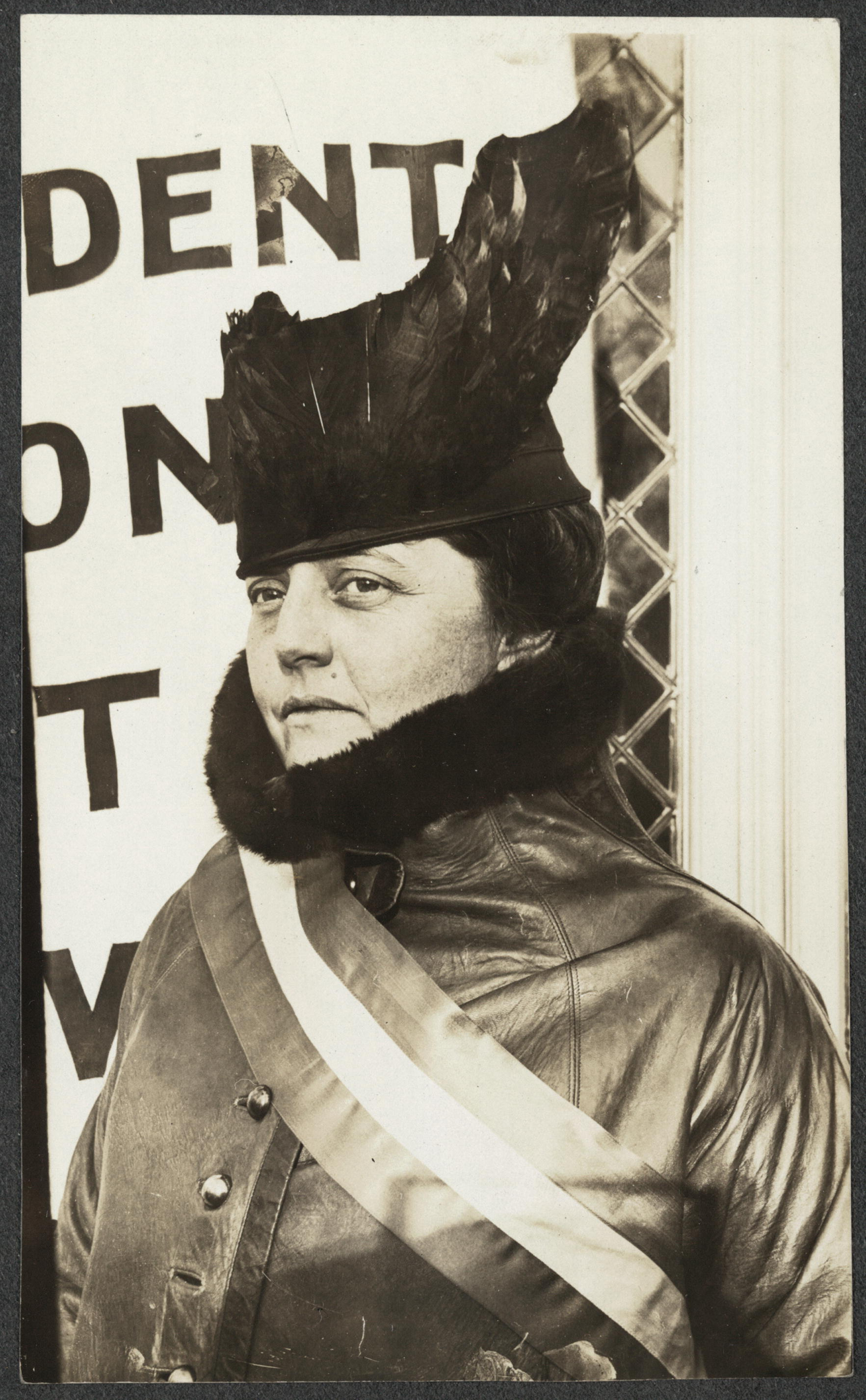
- Alison Turnbull Hopkins, picketing at the White House
- Born: Alison Low Turnbull; May 20, 1880; Morristown, New Jersey
- Died: March 18, 1951 (aged 70)
- Occupation: Suffragist
- Spouse: John Appleton Haven Hopkins (m. 1901; div. 1927)
- Children: 3

Alison Turnbull Hopkins (May 20, 1880 – March 18, 1951) was an American suffrage activist, known as one of the Silent Sentinels for her protests at the White House.

== Personal life ==
Alison Low Turnbull was born in 1880 in Morristown, New Jersey, to Lt Commander Frank Turnbull, a retired naval officer, and his wife, the former Marion Louise Bates, descendant of William Bradford, governor of Plymouth Colony in the 17th century. The couple had three children, Alison the oldest. She was raised on the family estate, "Feather Leigh Farms", where she was educated by private tutors. She left Morristown following her marriage to John Appleton Haven Hopkins a New York insurance executive, in 1901, returning in 1908, with her husband and three children, to make the estate their family home. The couple had three children, all born in New York City—John Milton (born 1903), Marion Louise (born 1904), and Douglas (born 1908).

During her marriage she was active in a number of civic and charitable organizations. She served as president of the Summer Shelter of Morristown, an organization that brought poor children out of the heat of New York City to Morristown, for a few weeks at a time, during the summer months. She was a member of the executive committee of the Morris County branch of the State Charities Aid Society and on the board of managers of the Speedwell Society, which placed convalescent children in foster homes for care and recuperation. Locally, she was a member of the Executive Committee of the Women's Town Improvement Committee, chair of the Ladies House Committee of the Morristown Field Club, a member of the Whipping River and Morristown Garden Clubs, and a member of the Morris County Corn Growing and Industrial Contests, which established educational initiatives in schools to promote industrial work in schools, as a way to help encourage children to stay in school. These initiatives developed school gardens and corn growing contests, later expanding to flower and vegetable gardens.

== Activism ==
Alison Turnbull Hopkins was a member of Heterodoxy, a women's debating club based in New York City. In 1914, she became active in the suffrage movement, stating that, due to her civic and charitable work, she had realized that women would need political power in order to achieve reform. She was elected to the executive committee of the Congressional Union for Women Suffrage and later became the New Jersey state chair for the National Woman's Party.

In 1915, she actively campaigned to pass referendums on woman suffrage in both New Jersey and New York; both were defeated, as were similar referendums in Massachusetts and Pennsylvania. At this point, suffragists decided to work together to focus on the passage of a federal amendment. Although Woodrow Wilson, a Democrat from New Jersey, had supported the referendum in his home state, in his bid for presidential reelection in 1916, he did not support a federal suffrage amendment.

John A. H. Hopkins, previously a member of the Progressive Party, headed the election campaign for Wilson in the state of New Jersey, while his wife, a Woman's Party leader, actively campaigned against the president. Among her notable political stunts was a speaking tour through Illinois in a car bearing the slogan "Don't Vote for Wilson," following William Jennings Bryan on his lecture tour.

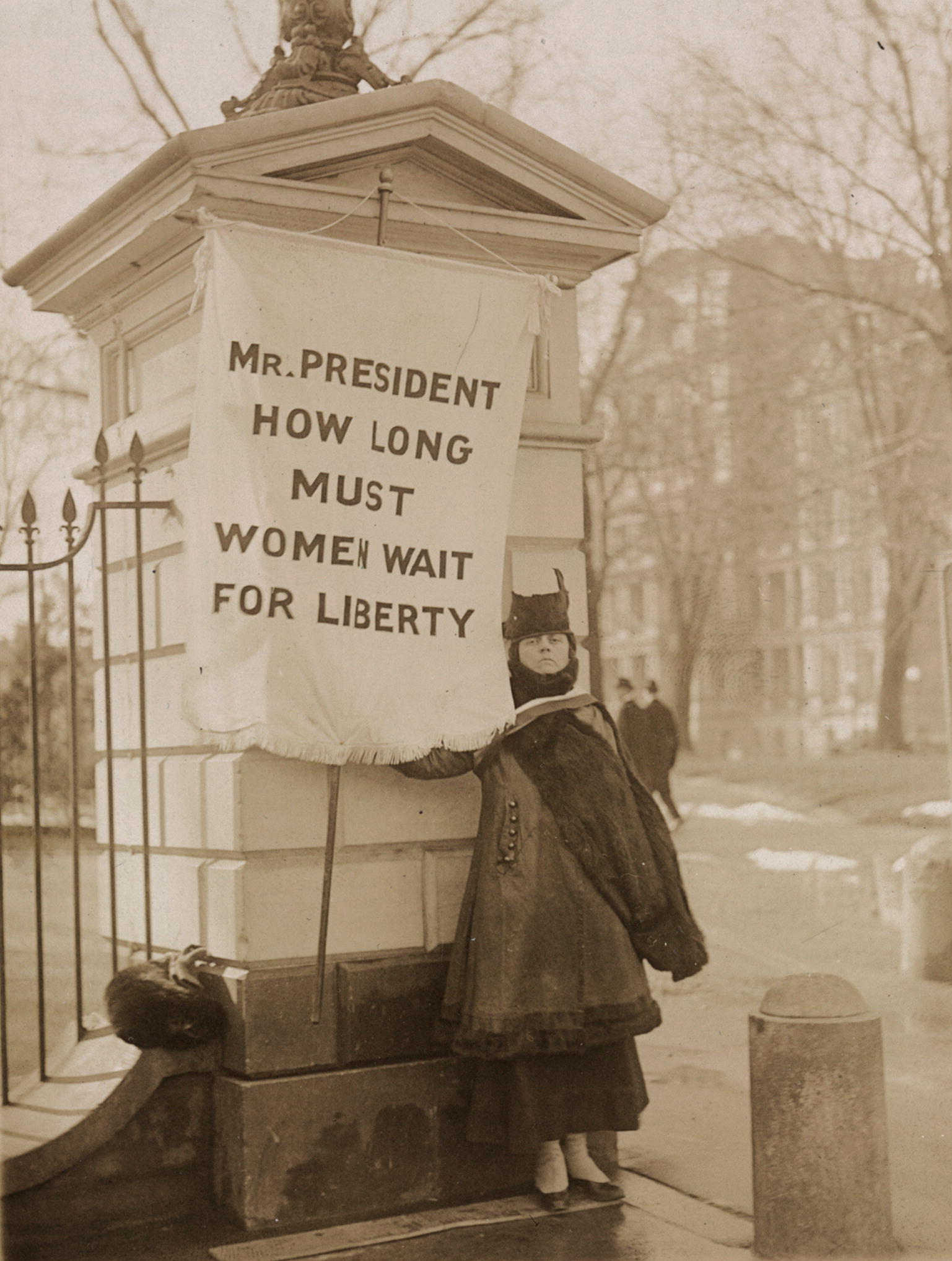
Hopkins demonstrating at the White House, 1917

In 1916, Hopkins was elected president of the New Jersey branch of the Congressional Union (NJCU). The Congressional Union merged with the Woman's Party to form the National Women's Party and in January, 1917, the NJCU became the New Jersey branch of the National Women's Party. Also in early 1917, the suffragists had begun picketing in front of the White House, calling themselves the Silent Sentinel.

In early March, Hopkins was among a large group of suffragists who paraded to the White House from the NWP headquarters. They hoped to be able to speak to Wilson, with the intent of gaining his support for a federal amendment. When they arrived, they found the gates locked and the White House grounds surrounded by police. Hopkins and several other leaders of the NWP remained at the front gate, while the remainder of the group paraded around the grounds. When Wilson, accompanied by his wife, rode through the gate in his limousine, he did not acknowledge their presence and the suffragists returned to the NWP headquarters.

At first, the Sentinels were ignored and then tolerated. After the United States entered World War I, animosity toward the protests increased, at times becoming violent. In late June, the police began arresting those women who participated in the picketing. They were charged with obstructing traffic and later dismissed on their own recognizance, but never brought to trial. After several days, the authorities saw that simple arrests were not stopping the demonstrations and on June 26, 1917, six women were tried, found guilty and sentenced to a $25 fine or three days in jail. Since they felt that by paying a fine they would be admitting guilt, all six were jailed.

On July 14, 1917, sixteen women, including Hopkins, paraded in front of the White House, with a new banner designed in commemoration of the anniversary of Bastille Day, which stated, "Liberty, Equality, Fraternity, July 14, 1789". The women were arrested. Charged with unlawful assembly and obstructing traffic, on July 17, they were sentenced to be jailed at Occoquan Workhouse for a period of sixty days. After their arrival at the workhouse, they were forced to dress in prison uniforms and jailed with other prisoners. John A. H. Hopkins visited his wife at Occoquan and then reported to President Wilson the deplorable conditions at the jail. The women were pardoned after three days by Wilson

Suffragettes used the pardon to help advance their cause stating that they had not asked for it and did not feel they should be pardoned, as they were not guilty of any crime. The morning following her release, Hopkins returned alone to the White House gates, displaying signs that read "We ask not pardon for ourselves but justice for all American women" and "Mr. President How long must women wait for liberty." She also wrote a letter to Wilson, stating that, by pardoning her, he had denied her the right to appeal her arrest. She also accused him of signing the pardon in order to prevent any political embarrassment. Copies of this letter were distributed to members of the press. Alison Turnbull Hopkins was not arrested again.

Having spent any time at all in Occoquan Workhouse was a matter of pride among American suffragists; Mrs. Hopkins posed in her prison garb for publicity photos, lectured on the experience, and received honors as an imprisoned picket for several years after the event.

== Later life ==
After suffrage was won, Alison Turnbull Hopkins opened a dress shop in New York City, called Marjane Ltd. The Hopkinses divorced in 1927. Alison Turnbull Hopkins died in 1951, age 70. Her niece was socialite Marjorie Oelrichs.
