= Eddy Duchin =

American jazz pianist and bandleader (1909–1951)

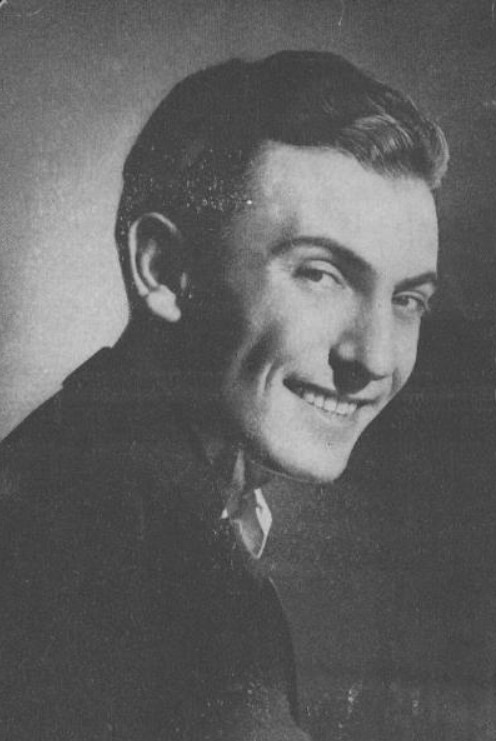
- Eddy Duchin in a 1942 advertisement

Background information
- Born: Edwin Frank Duchin; April 1, 1909; Cambridge, Massachusetts, U.S.
- Died: February 9, 1951 (aged 41) Manhattan, New York City, NY, U.S.
- Genres: Traditional pop, sweet jazz
- Occupations: Musician, bandleader
- Instrument: Piano
- Years active: 1930–1951
- Labels: Columbia, Brunswick
- Spouse: Marjorie Oelrichs (m. 1935)

Edwin Frank Duchin (April 1, 1909 – February 9, 1951), commonly known as Eddy Duchin or alternatively Eddie Duchin, was an American popular music pianist and bandleader during the 1930s and 1940s.

== Early career ==
Duchin was born on April 1, 1909, in Cambridge, Massachusetts, United States, to Bessarabian Jewish immigrants Tillie (née Baron; 1885 – March 21, 1962) and Frank Duchin (June 2, 1885 – May 15, 1957).

After graduating from Beverly High School, he attended the Massachusetts College of Pharmacy and was originally a pharmacist before turning full-time to music and beginning his new career with Leo Reisman's orchestra at the Central Park Casino in New York, an elegant nightclub where he became popular in his own right, causing strife between him and Reisman. By 1932, Reisman's contract with the Central Park Casino was being terminated, leaving violinist Leo Kahn as the interim leader of the orchestra. After 6 weeks, Duchin had assumed Kahn's place as the orchestra's leader. He became widely popular thanks to regular radio broadcasts that boosted his record sales, and he was one of the earliest pianists to lead a commercially successful large band.

== Musical style ==
Playing what later came to be called "sweet" music rather than jazz, Duchin opened a new gate for similarly styled, piano-playing sweet bandleaders such as Henry King, Joe Reichman, Nat Brandwynne, Dick Gasparre, Little Jack Little, and particularly Carmen Cavallaro (who acknowledged Duchin's influence) to compete with the large jazz bands for radio time and record sales.

Duchin had no formal music training—which was said to frustrate his musicians at times—but he developed a style rooted in classical music that some saw as the forerunner of Liberace's ornate, gaudy approach. Still, there were understatements in Duchin's music. By no means was Duchin a perfect pianist, but he was easy to listen to without being rote or entirely predictable. He was a pleasing stage presence whose favourite technique was to play his piano cross-handed, using only one finger on the lower hand, and he was respectful to his audiences and to his classical influences.

Duchin often used beautiful, soft-voiced singers such as Durelle Alexander and Lew Sherwood to accommodate his sweet and romantic songs, giving them extra appeal and making them more interesting.

He had a 1940 hit with the song "So You're the One" written for him by Hy Zaret, Alex Kramer and Joan Whitney.

== Late career ==
Duchin entered the U.S. Navy during World War II, serving as a combat officer in a destroyer squadron in the Mediterranean and Pacific. He attained the rank of lieutenant commander (O4). Duchin's military awards included the Navy Commendation ribbon with Combat "V", Combat Action ribbon, American Area Campaign medal, the European-Africa-Middle Eastern Area Campaign medal, the Asiatic-Pacific Area Campaign medal, and the World War II Victory medal. After his discharge from the military, Duchin was unable to reclaim his former stardom in spite of a stab at a new radio show in 1949.

== Personal life ==
Duchin met his future wife, the socialite Marjorie Oelrichs, at the Waldorf in New York City, and wed at Oelrichs' mother's apartment at the Hotel Pierre on June 5, 1935, officiated by Judge Vincent Lippe. They had one son, Peter Duchin, born July 28, 1937. Tragically, Marjorie died just six days after the birth. Duchin had a second child, born August 15, 1938, with model Marguerite O'Malley; and a third, Annette Kalten, born April 26, 1940, with Millie Yammarino. In 1947, he married a second time to Spanish-Filipina Maria Teresa "Chiquita" Parke-Smith (1912-1980), daughter of Teresa Parke-Smith Bertran de Lis y Pastor.

On February 9, 1951, Eddy Duchin died at age 41 at Memorial Hospital in Manhattan of acute myelogenous leukemia. He was cremated, and his ashes were scattered in the Atlantic Ocean.

In the 1996 memoir Ghost of a Chance, his son Peter wrote of the factual discrepancies in the film The Eddy Duchin Story.

The Duchin Lounge in the Sun Valley Lodge was reportedly named after Marjorie Duchin by W. Averell Harriman, who raised Eddy Duchin's son Peter as his own after both of his parents had died.

== Legacy ==
By the mid-1950s, Columbia Pictures, having enjoyed success with musical biographies, mounted a feature film based on the bandleader's life. The Eddy Duchin Story (1956) is a fictionalized tearjerker, with Tyrone Power in the title role, and piano dubbed by Carmen Cavallaro. The film did well in theaters.

Dancing with Duchin, an anthology of some of Duchin's recordings, was released in 2002.
