= Bodley =

Bodley may refer to:

== Surname ==
- Edward Fisher Bodley (1815–1881), English businessman
- George Frederick Bodley (1827–1907), English architect
- John Edward Courtenay Bodley (1853–1925), English civil servant and historian
- Josias Bodley (1550–1618), English soldier notable for his service in Ireland
- Mick Bodley (born 1967), English footballer
- R. V. C. Bodley (1892–1970), English author and military officer
- Rachel Bodley (1831–1888), American professor and university leader
- Robert Bodley (1878–1956), South African Olympic rifle shooter
- Seóirse Bodley (1933–2023), Irish composer
- Thomas Bodley (1545–1613), English diplomat and founder of the Bodleian Library

== Given name ==
- Bodley Scott (disambiguation), several people

== Other ==
- The Bodley Head, publishing imprint founded in 1887
- Bodley Medal, literary award
- Bodley Gallery, New York
- Bodley, Devon, English village
- Bodley Survey, a study of Ireland undertaken in 1609
- Codex Bodley, Mixtec pictographic manuscript

== See also ==
- Bodleian Library, University of Oxford
