= Satellite Award for Best Supporting Actor – Series, Miniseries or Television Film =

Annual television award

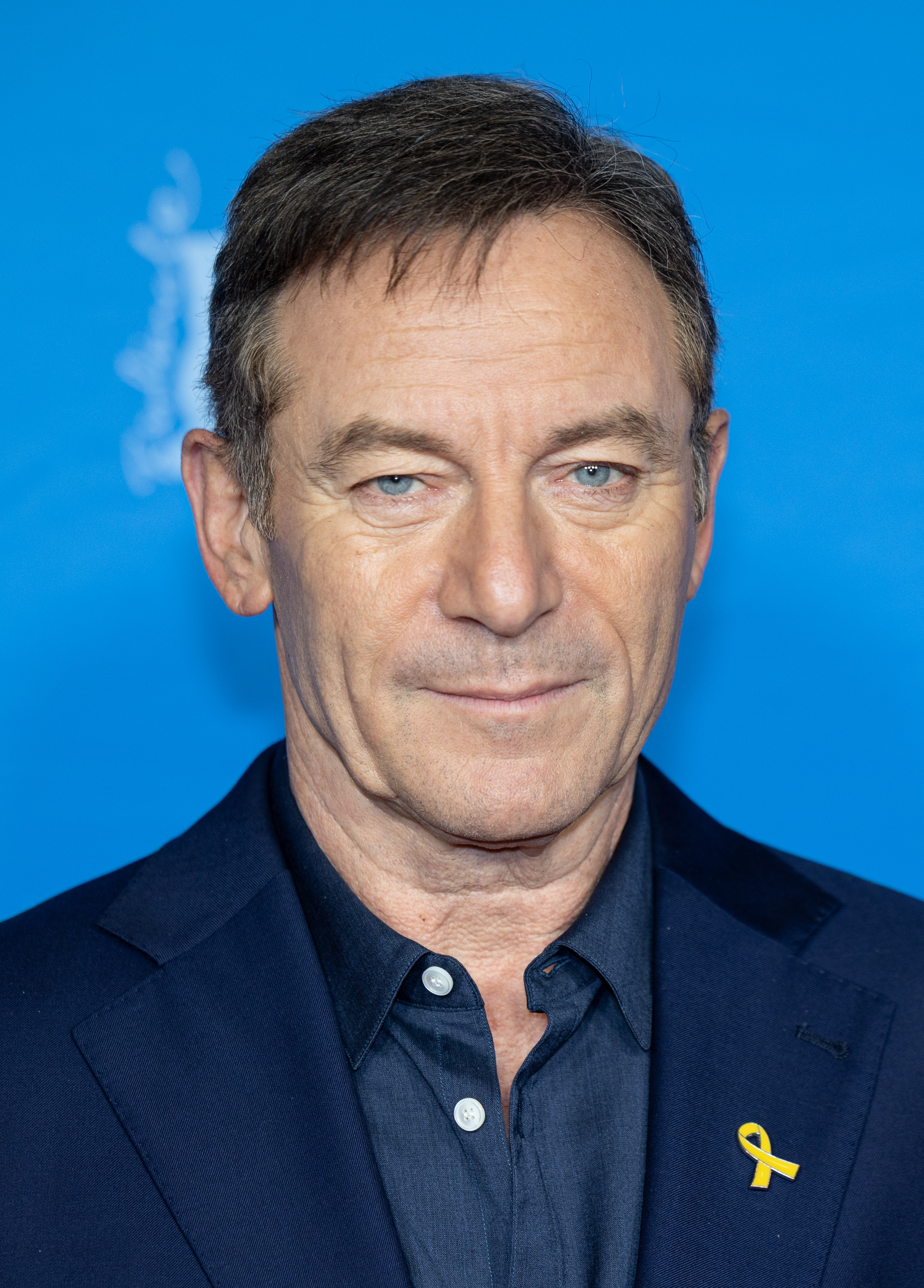
- The 2025 recipient: Jason Isaacs
- Awarded for: Best Supporting Actor in a Series, Miniseries or Television Film
- Country: United States
- Presented by: International Press Academy
- First award: 1996
- Currently held by: Jason Isaacs – The White Lotus (2025)

The Satellite Award for Best Supporting Actor in a Series, Miniseries, or Television Film is one of the annual Satellite Awards given by the International Press Academy.

== Winners and nominees ==
=== 1990s ===
Year	Actor	Series	Role	Network
1996	Stanley Tucci	Murder One	Richard Cross	ABC
1996	Ian McKellen	Rasputin: Dark Servant of Destiny	Tsar Nicholas II	HBO
1996	Anthony Quinn	Gotti	Aniello Dellacroce	HBO
1996	Treat Williams	The Late Shift	Michael Ovitz	HBO
1996	Brian Dennehy	A Season in Purgatory	Gerald Bradley	CBS
1997	Vondie Curtis-Hall	Don King: Only in America	Lloyd Price	HBO
1997	Jason Alexander	Cinderella	Lionel	ABC
1997	Joe Don Baker	George Wallace	Big Jim Folsom	TNT
1997	Ossie Davis	Miss Evers' Boys	Mr. Evers	HBO
1997	Michael Caine	Mandela and de Klerk	F. W. de Klerk	Showtime
1998	David Clennon	From the Earth to the Moon	Leon Silver	HBO
1998	Brian Dennehy	Thanks of a Grateful Nation	Senator Riegle	Showtime
1998	Lance Henriksen	The Day Lincoln Was Shot	Abraham Lincoln	TNT
1998	Martin Short	Merlin	Frik	NBC
1998	Daniel Williams	Always Outnumbered	Darryl	HBO
1999	Not presented			

=== 2000s ===
Year	Actor	Series	Role	Network
2000	Not presented			
2001	David Schwimmer	Band of Brothers	Captain Herbert Sobel	HBO
2001	Billy Campbell	Further Tales of the City	Dr. Jon Fielding	Showtime
2001	Colin Firth	Conspiracy	Wilhelm Stuckart	HBO
2001	Stanley Tucci	Conspiracy	Adolf Eichmann	HBO
2001	Cary Elwes	Uprising	Dr. Fritz Hippler	NBC
2002	Linus Roache	The Gathering Storm	Ralph Wigram	HBO
2002	Roy Scheider	King of Texas	Henry Westover	TNT
2002	Jim Broadbent	The Gathering Storm	Desmond Morton	HBO
2002	Jeremy Davies	The Laramie Project	Jedadiah Schultz	HBO
2002	Terry Kinney	The Laramie Project	Dennis Shepard	HBO
2003	Justin Kirk	Angels in America	Prior Walter / Leatherman in park	HBO
2003	Shawn Hatosy	Soldier's Girl	Justin Fisher	Showtime
2003	Patrick Wilson	Angels in America	Joe Pitt	HBO
2003	Jeffrey Wright	Angels in America	Mr. Lies / Norman "Belize" Arriaga / Homeless man / The Angel Europa	HBO
2003	Chris Cooper	My House in Umbria	Thomas Riversmith	HBO
2003	Eion Bailey	And Starring Pancho Villa as Himself	Frank N. Thayer	HBO
2004	Bill Nighy	The Lost Prince	Arthur Bigge, 1st Baron Stamfordham	BBC One
2004	Brad Dourif	Deadwood	Dr. Amos "Doc" Cochran	HBO
2004	Balthazar Getty	Traffic	Ben Edmonds	USA Network
2004	William H. Macy	Stealing Sinatra	John Irwin	Showtime
2004	Keith McErlean	The Blackwater Lightship	Declan Breen	CBS
2005	Randy Quaid	Elvis	Colonel Tom Parker	CBS
2005	Brian Dennehy	Our Fathers	Father Dominic Spagnolia	Showtime
2005	Ruben Santiago-Hudson	Their Eyes Were Watching God	Joe Starks	ABC
2005	William Shatner	Boston Legal	Denny Crane	ABC
2005	Tim Blake Nelson	Warm Springs	Tom Loyless	HBO
2005	Paul Newman	Empire Falls	Max Roby	HBO
2006	Tony Plana	Ugly Betty	Ignacio Suarez	ABC
2006	Philip Baker Hall	The Loop	Russ McDonald	Fox
2006	Robert Knepper	Prison Break	Theodore "T-Bag" Bagwell	Fox
2006	Michael Emerson	Lost	Ben Linus	ABC
2006	Jeremy Piven	Entourage	Ari Gold	HBO
2006	Forest Whitaker	The Shield	Lieutenant Jon Kavanaugh	FX
2007	David Zayas	Dexter	Angel Batista	Showtime
2007	Harry Dean Stanton	Big Love	Roman Grant	HBO
2007	Andy Serkis	Longford	Ian Brady	HBO
2007	Michael Emerson	Lost	Ben Linus	ABC
2007	T. R. Knight	Grey's Anatomy	George O'Malley	ABC
2007	Justin Kirk	Weeds	Andy Botwin	Showtime
2007	Masi Oka	Heroes	Hiro Nakamura	NBC
2008	Nelsan Ellis	True Blood	Lafayette Reynolds	HBO
2008	Željko Ivanek	Damages	Ray Fiske	FX
2008	Harvey Keitel	Life on Mars	Gene Hunt	ABC
2008	Jimmy Smits	Dexter	Miguel Prado	Showtime
2008	John Noble	Fringe	Dr Walter Bishop	Fox
2008	John Slattery	Mad Men	Roger Sterling	AMC
2009	John Lithgow	Dexter	Arthur Mitchell	Showtime
2009	Tom Courtenay	Little Dorrit	William Dorrit	PBS
2009	Neil Patrick Harris	How I Met Your Mother	Barney Stinson	CBS
2009	John Noble	Fringe	Dr Walter Bishop	Fox
2009	Chris Colfer	Glee	Kurt Hummel	Fox
2009	Harry Dean Stanton	Big Love	Roman Grant	HBO

=== 2010s ===
Year	Actor	Series	Role	Network
2010	David Strathairn	Temple Grandin	Dr. Carlock	HBO
2010	Ty Burrell	Modern Family	Phil Dunphy	ABC
2010	Bruce Campbell	Burn Notice	Sam Axe	USA Network
2010	Chris Colfer	Glee	Kurt Hummel	Fox
2010	Alan Cumming	The Good Wife	Eli Gold	CBS
2010	Neil Patrick Harris	How I Met Your Mother	Barney Stinson	CBS
2010	Aaron Paul	Breaking Bad	Jesse Pinkman	AMC
2010	Martin Short	Damages	Leonard Winstone	FX
2010	Rainn Wilson	The Office	Dwight Schrute	NBC
2011	Peter Dinklage	Game of Thrones	Tyrion Lannister	HBO
2011	Ryan Hurst	Sons of Anarchy	Harry "Opie" Winston	FX
2011	Ty Burrell	Modern Family	Phil Dunphy	ABC
2011	Donald Glover	Community	Troy Barnes	NBC
2011	Walton Goggins	Justified	Boyd Crowder	FX
2011	Neil Patrick Harris	How I Met Your Mother	Barney Stinson	CBS
2011	Guy Pearce	Mildred Pierce	Monty Beragon	HBO
2011	James Woods	Too Big to Fail	Richard S. Fuld Jr.	HBO
2012	Neal McDonough	Justified	Robert Quarles	FX
2012	Powers Boothe	Nashville	Lamar Wyatt	ABC
2012	Jim Carter	Downton Abbey	Charles "Charlie" Carson	PBS
2012	Peter Dinklage	Game of Thrones	Tyrion Lannister	HBO
2012	Giancarlo Esposito	Breaking Bad	Gus Fring	AMC
2012	Evan Peters	American Horror Story: Asylum	Kit Walker	FX
2013	Aaron Paul	Breaking Bad	Jesse Pinkman	AMC
2013	Nikolaj Coster-Waldau	Game of Thrones	Jaime Lannister	HBO
2013	William Hurt	Bonnie & Clyde	Frank Hamer	Lifetime
2013	James Wolk	Mad Men	Bob Benson	AMC
2013	Peter Sarsgaard	The Killing	Ray Seward	AMC
2013	Jimmy Smits	Sons of Anarchy	Nero Padilla	FX
2013	Corey Stoll	House of Cards	Peter Russo	Netflix
2014	Rory Kinnear	Penny Dreadful	The Creature	Showtime
2014	Peter Dinklage	Game of Thrones	Tyrion Lannister	HBO
2014	Matt Bomer	The Normal Heart	Felix Turner	HBO
2014	Christopher Eccleston	The Leftovers	Matt Jamison	HBO
2014	Andre Holland	The Knick	Dr. Algernon C. Edwards	Cinemax
2014	Jimmy Smits	Sons of Anarchy	Nero Padilla	FX
2015	Christian Slater	Mr. Robot	Mr. Robot	USA Network
2015	Jonathan Banks	Better Call Saul	Mike Ehrmantraut	AMC
2015	Peter Dinklage	Game of Thrones	Tyrion Lannister	HBO
2015	Michael K. Williams	Bessie	Jack Gee	HBO
2015	Elvis Nolasco	American Crime	Carter Nix	ABC
2016	Ben Mendelsohn	Bloodline	Danny Rayburn	Netflix
2016	Jonathan Banks	Better Call Saul	Mike Ehrmantraut	AMC
2016	Hugh Laurie	The Night Manager	Richard "Dicky" Onslow Roper	AMC
2016	Andre Braugher	Brooklyn Nine-Nine	Raymond Holt	Fox
2016	Michael Kelly	House of Cards	Douglas "Doug" Stamper	Netflix
2016	Jared Harris	The Crown	King George VI	Netflix
2017	Michael McKean	Better Call Saul	Chuck McGill	AMC
2017	Louie Anderson	Baskets	Christine Baskets	FX
2017	Stanley Tucci	Feud: Bette and Joan	Jack L. Warner	FX
2017	Christopher Eccleston	The Leftovers	Matt Jamison	HBO
2017	Alexander Skarsgård	Big Little Lies	Perry Wright	HBO
2017	Lakeith Stanfield	War Machine	Corporal Billy Cole	Netflix
2018	Hugo Weaving	Patrick Melrose	David Melrose	Showtime
2018	Mark Duplass	Goliath	Tom Wyatt	Prime Video
2018	Ben Whishaw	A Very English Scandal	Norman Josiffe/Norman Scott	Prime Video
2018	John Macmillan	King Lear	Edmund	BBC Two
2018	Édgar Ramírez	The Assassination of Gianni Versace: American Crime Story	Gianni Versace	FX
2018	Paul Ready	The Terror	Assistant Surgeon Harry Goodsir	AMC
2019	Jeremy Strong	Succession	Kendall Roy	HBO
2019	Alan Arkin	The Kominsky Method	Norman Newlander	Netflix
2019	Stellan Skarsgård	Chernobyl	Boris Shcherbina	HBO
2019	Walton Goggins	The Righteous Gemstones	"Baby" Billy Freeman	HBO
2019	Dennis Quaid	Goliath	Wade Blackwood	Prime Video
2019	Andrew Scott	Fleabag	The Priest	Prime Video
2019	Tony Shalhoub	The Marvelous Mrs. Maisel	Abraham "Abe" Weissman	Prime Video

=== 2020s ===
Year	Actor	Series	Role	Network
2020	Jeff Wilbusch	Unorthodox	Moishe Lefkovitch	Netflix
2020	Joshua Caleb Johnson	The Good Lord Bird	Henry "Onion" Shackleford	Showtime
2020	Josh O'Connor	The Crown	Charles, Prince of Wales	Netflix
2020	Tom Pelphrey	Ozark	Ben Davis	Netflix
2020	Donald Sutherland	The Undoing	Franklin Reinhardt	HBO
2020	Ben Whishaw	Fargo	Rabbi Milligan	FX
2021	Evan Peters	Mare of Easttown	Detective Colin Zabel	HBO
2021	Bobby Cannavale	Nine Perfect Strangers	Tony Hogburn	Hulu
2021	John Carroll Lynch	Big Sky	Rick Legarski	ABC
2021	Paul Reiser	The Kominsky Method	Martin	Netflix
2021	Michael Shannon	Nine Perfect Strangers	Napoleon Marconi	Hulu
2022	John Lithgow	The Old Man	Harold Harper	FX
2022	Giancarlo Esposito	Better Call Saul	Gus Fring	AMC
2022	Walton Goggins	The Righteous Gemstones	Baby Billy Freeman	HBO
2022	Richard Jenkins	Dahmer – Monster: The Jeffrey Dahmer Story	Lionel Dahmer	Netflix
2022	Shea Whigham	Gaslit	G. Gordon Liddy	Starz
2022	Sam Worthington	Under the Banner of Heaven	Ron Lafferty	Hulu
2023	Jonathan Bailey	Fellow Travelers	Tim Laughlin	Showtime
2023	Khalid Abdalla	The Crown	Dodi Fayed	Netflix
2023	Murray Bartlett	The Last of Us	Frank	HBO
2023	James Cromwell	Succession	Ewan Roy	HBO
2023	Jon Gries	The White Lotus	Greg Hunt	HBO
2023	Lamar Johnson	The Last of Us	Henry Burrell	HBO
2024	Robert Downey Jr.	The Sympathizer	Claude/Nicos Damianos/Professor Hammer/Ned Godwin/Priest	HBO
2024	Tadanobu Asano	Shōgun	Kashigi Yabushige	FX Network/Hulu
2024	Walton Goggins	Fallout	Ghoul (Cooper Howard)	Amazon Prime Video
2024	Ebon Moss-Bachrach	The Bear	Richard "Richie" Jerimovich	FX Network/Hulu
2024	Chris Perfetti	Abbott Elementary	Jacob Hill	ABC
2024	Benny Safdie	The Curse	Dougie Schecter	Paramount+
2025	Jason Isaacs	The White Lotus	Timothy Ratliff	HBO
2025	Owen Cooper	Adolescence	Jamie Miller	Netflix
2025	Billy Crudup	The Morning Show	Cory Ellison	Apple TV
2025	Walton Goggins	The White Lotus	Rick Hatchett	HBO
2025	Ebon Moss-Bachrach	The Bear	Richard "Richie" Jerimovich	FX on Hulu
2025	Chris Perfetti	Abbott Elementary	Jacob Hill	ABC
2025	Tramell Tillman	Severance	Seth Milchick / Mr. Milchick	Apple TV
