= Paul Freeman (actor) =

English actor (born 1943)

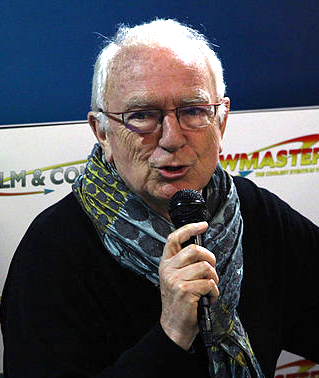
- Freeman in 2016
- Born: 18 January 1943 (age 83); Barnet, Hertfordshire, England
- Occupation: Actor
- Years active: 1967–present
- Spouse(s): Judy Matheson (m. 1967; div.); Maggie Scott
- Children: 1

Paul Freeman (born 18 January 1943) is an English actor who has appeared in theatre, television and film. Internationally, he is known for playing the rival archaeologist René Belloq in Raiders of the Lost Ark (1981), evil wine baron Gustav Riebmann on season 4 of the soap opera Falcon Crest (1984–85), and supervillain Ivan Ooze in Mighty Morphin Power Rangers: The Movie (1995). His other credits include Morlang (2001), When I'm 64 (2004), Hot Fuzz (2007) and Hard Boiled Sweets (2012). In the UK, he had a leading role in the television series Yesterday's Dreams (1987) as Martin Daniels.

Referring to Freeman's extensive theatre work, in 1995 the Los Angeles Times described him as "one of Britain's best-regarded actors, classically trained, with stints at the Royal Shakespeare Company and the National Theatre".

== Early life ==
Freeman was born in Barnet, Hertfordshire, on 18 January 1943.

== Career ==
Freeman began his career in advertising and teaching, and gained small roles in the theatre, appearing in productions of A Midsummer Night's Dream and Hamlet. He had roles at the National Theatre and the Royal Shakespeare Company.

Freeman made his television debut in 1978 in the serial Will Shakespeare (1978). He also acted in the docudrama Death of a Princess, a film about the execution of Misha'al bint Fahd al Saud of Saudi Arabia. Freeman began his feature film career in 1980 when he appeared in The Long Good Friday and The Dogs of War. In 1981, he played Ralph Wigram in the television series Winston Churchill: The Wilderness Years.

In the same year, Steven Spielberg and George Lucas chose Freeman to play archaeologist René Belloq, the archrival to Indiana Jones, in the adventure film Raiders of the Lost Ark, opposite Harrison Ford. The film led to Freeman becoming typecast in villainous roles, especially Nazis. He played the head of the Cartel and masqueraded as a conniving wine baron Gustav Riebmann in the fourth season of Falcon Crest, airing in 1984–1985.

Freeman starred as Martin Daniels in the series Yesterday's Dreams in 1987.

In 1988, Freeman played Professor Moriarty in comedy film Without a Clue, which starred Michael Caine as a mini-brained Sherlock Holmes and Ben Kingsley as Watson, who is secretly the real crime-solving genius. In 1995, Freeman was cast as the villain Ivan Ooze in Mighty Morphin Power Rangers: The Movie.

Freeman guest-starred in television shows such as Monarch of the Glen, ER, Falcon Crest, and The Young Indiana Jones Chronicles. He also played in several mini-series, including Murderers Among Us: The Simon Wiesenthal Story (1989), and The Final Cut (1995). In 2004, Freeman played Angus, Bobby Jones' caddie, in Bobby Jones: A Stroke of Genius. During 2006 and 2007, he played Laurence Scammel QC in the drama New Street Law. Also in 2007, he played Rev. Philip Shooter of Sandford in the action comedy film Hot Fuzz.

Among his television work, Freeman has appeared in an episode of Midsomer Murders, titled "Down Among the Dead Men". He also appeared in Waking the Dead in the episode "Straw Dog", and played Adam Kingsley in the BBC adaptation of Minette Walters' The Dark Room. He appeared in Agatha Christie's Poirot in the episode "Appointment with Death", playing Colonel Carbury.

Freeman appeared as George Aaranow in the 2008 London revival of David Mamet's Glengarry Glen Ross.

In 2012, Freeman played Thomas Erpingham in the BBC adaptation of William Shakespeare's Henry V from The Hollow Crown series.

== Personal life ==
Freeman is married to Maggie Scott, who was his co-star in the 1980 film The Dogs of War. They have one daughter.

Freeman and Scott are both co-founders of the charity UK Friends of Healing Focus (UKHF), which works in partnership with Uganda NGO, Healing Focus Orphanage Centre. Freeman is a regular visitor to the orphanage.

== Filmography ==
=== Film ===
| Year | Title | Role | Notes |
|---|---|---|---|
| 1974 | Feelings | Paul Martin | |
| 1980 | The Long Good Friday | Colin | |
| 1980 | The Dogs of War | Derek Godwin | |
| 1981 | Raiders of the Lost Ark | René Emile Belloq | Nominated – Saturn Award for Best Supporting Actor |
| 1982 | An Unsuitable Job for a Woman | James Calendar | |
| 1982 | Who Dares Wins | Sir Richard | |
| 1982 | The Sender | Dr. Joseph Denman | |
| 1983 | Si elle dit oui... je ne dis pas non | Nick | |
| 1984 | Flight to Berlin | Nicholas | |
| 1986 | Shanghai Surprise | Walter Faraday | |
| 1988 | Prisoner of Rio | Ronald Biggs | |
| 1988 | A World Apart | Kruger | |
| 1988 | Without a Clue | Professor Moriarty | |
| 1990 | The Last Island | Sean | |
| 1990 | Eminent Domain | Ben | |
| 1992 | Aces: Iron Eagle III | Gustav Kleiss | |
| 1992 | Just Like a Woman | Miles Millichamp | |
| 1993 | Piccolo grande amore | Count Otto Von Dix | Also known as: Pretty Princess |
| 1995 | Mighty Morphin Power Rangers: The Movie | Ivan Ooze | |
| 1995 | The Horseman on the Roof | Laurent de Theus | |
| 1996 | Squillo | Marco | Also known as: Call Girl |
| 1997 | Double Team | Alex Goldsmythe | |
| 2000 | The 3 Kings | Melchior | |
| 2001 | Morlang | Julius Morlang | Cairo International Film Festival Award for Best Actor |
| 2002 | Mrs Caldicot's Cabbage War | Jenkins | |
| 2002 | And Now... Ladies and Gentlemen | English customer | |
| 2002 | The Elephant and the Snail | Narrator | Animated short film. English version |
| 2002 | Haker | President of MIT | |
| 2004 | George and the Dragon | Sir Robert | |
| 2004 | Bobby Jones: Stroke of Genius | Angus | |
| 2005 | The Feast of the Goat | Agustin Cabral | Also known as: La fiesta del Chivo |
| 2007 | Hot Fuzz | Rev. Philip Shooter | |
| 2007 | A Girl and a Gun | Eddie | Video short |
| 2010 | Centurion | Governor Agricola | |
| 2011 | Viral | Salvo | Short film |
| 2012 | Hard Boiled Sweets | Shrewd Eddie | |
| 2012 | A Fantastic Fear of Everything | Dr. Friedkin | |
| 2012 | After Death | The Inventor | |
| 2013 | Trimming Pablo | Pablo Picasso | Short film |
| 2013 | Getaway | The Man | |
| 2013 | Bad Day at the Office | Narrator | Short film |
| 2014 | Promakhos | Callum | Also known as: The First Line |
| 2015 | A Private Man | Old Man | Short film |
| 2016 | High Strung | Kramrovsky | |
| 2016 | The Gatehouse | Evelyn Eldritch | |
| 2018 | Viking Destiny | Tarburn | Also known as: Of Gods and Warriors |
| 2022 | Darkheart Manor | James Jones | |
| 2022 | The Man from Rome | Father Príamo Ferro | |
| 2025 | Whispers of Freedom | Erich Honecker | Short film |
| 2025 | The Thursday Murder Club | John Grey | |
| 2026 | Gorky Resort | Coachman | |

=== Television ===
| Year | Title | Role | Notes |
|---|---|---|---|
| 1967 | Champion House | Elwyn | Episode: "The Saddest Words" |
| 1972 | The Last of the Baskets | Bernard Rage | Episode: "Since Then I Have Used No Other" |
| 1972 | Jason King | Male Revolutionary | Episode: "Zenia" |
| 1972 | The Protectors | Mechanic | Episode: "A Kind of Wild Justice" |
| 1973 | Coronation Street | Terry Slade | 2 episodes |
| 1973 | ITV Sunday Night Theatre | Keith | Episode: "Katapult" |
| 1974 | Crown Court | Leonard Tyler | Episodes: "Good and Faithful Friends: Parts 1–3" |
| 1974 | Childhood | Lockwood | Episode: "Baa Baa Black Sheep" |
| 1976 | Couples | Douglas Broom | 3 episodes |
| 1976 | The XYY Man | Ray Lynch | 3 episodes |
| 1978 | Scorpion Tales | Oliver Benthall | Episode: "The Great Albert" |
| 1978 | Crown Court | John Barnard | Episodes: "The Song Not the Singer: Parts 1–3" |
| 1978 | Will Shakespeare | Dick Burbage | Miniseries; 6 episodes |
| 1978 | The Sweeney | 1st Detective | Episode: "Hearts and Minds" |
| 1979 | Play of the Month | Kravchenko | Episode: "Marya" |
| 1980 | Death of a Princess | Christopher Ryder | Television film |
| 1980 | Play for Today | Alexander Kutsov | Episode: "A Walk in the Forest" |
| 1981 | Winston Churchill: The Wilderness Years | Ralph Wigram | Miniseries; 3 episodes |
| 1981 | Play for Today | Doctor | Episode: "No Visible Scar" |
| 1982 | BBC2 Playhouse | Max | Episode: "The Workshop" |
| 1982 | Play for Today | Willie | Episode: "Willie's Last Stand" |
| 1982 | Q.E.D. | Professor Vincent Rep | Episode: "4:10 to Zurich" |
| 1982 | Crown Court | Henry Lytton QC | Episodes: "Face Value: Parts 1–3" |
| 1982 | Gavilan | Mr. Snow | Episode: "Sarah and the Buzz" |
| 1983 | Enemies of the State | Julius Tomin | Television film |
| 1984 | Cagney & Lacey | Yves Benoit | Episode: "Victimless Crime" |
| 1984 | Sakharov | Pavel Leontiev | Television film |
| 1984 | Mitch | Harry Warren | Episode: "Postman's Knock" |
| 1984–1985 | Falcon Crest | Gustav Riebmann | Season 4; 19 episodes |
| 1985 | A.D. | Cornelius the Centurion | Miniseries; 3 episodes |
| 1986 | Sins | Mueller | Miniseries; 3 episodes |
| 1986 | Worlds Beyond | Richard Wentworth | Episode: "Guardian of the Past" |
| 1987 | Yesterday's Dreams | Martin Daniels | 7 episodes |
| 1987 | The Index Has Gone Fishing | Johnny Rowden | Television film |
| 1988 | Boon | Ronnie Hains | Episode: "The Devil You Know" |
| 1989 | Twist of Fate | SS-Oberfuhrer Mittendorf | Miniseries; 2 episodes. Also known as: Pursuit |
| 1989 | Magic Moments | Brian Swann | Television film |
| 1989 | Murderers Among Us: The Simon Wiesenthal Story | Josef | Television film |
| 1990 | Perry Mason: The Case of the Desperate Deception | Carl Meyerhoff | Television film |
| 1990 | May Wine | Tom | Television film. Also known as: Les belles Américaines |
| 1991 | Under Cover | Col. Kalganin | Episode: "War Game" |
| 1992 | Van der Valk | Michael Tromp | Episode: "Proof of Life" |
| 1992 | Double Edge | Ferese | Television film |
| 1992 | A Dangerous Man: Lawrence After Arabia | Dumont | Television film |
| 1992 | Boon | Edward Cameron | Episode: "Minder" |
| 1992–1993 | The Young Indiana Jones Chronicles | Frederick Selous | 2 episodes |
| 1993 | Full Stretch | Freddie Reid | Episode: "Deals on Wheels" |
| 1993 | In Suspicious Circumstances | Sir Patrick Hasings | Episode: #3.1. Segment: "Laugh Baby Laugh" |
| 1993 | Between the Lines | Nicholas Shaw | Episode: "Honourable Man" |
| 1994 | Viper | Dr. Samuels | Episode: "Once a Thief" |
| 1994 | Lie Down with Lions | Dubois | Television film. Also known as: Red Eagle |
| 1994 | Grushko | Bosenko | 2 episodes |
| 1995 | The Final Cut | Tom Makepeace | Miniseries; 4 episodes |
| 1996 | Tales from the Crypt | Alistair Touchstone | Episode: "Smoke Wrings" |
| 1996 | Samson and Delilah | Manoah | Miniseries; 2 episodes |
| 1996 | Circles of Deceit | Armitage | Miniseries; episode: "Sleeping Dogs" |
| 1997 | The Ruth Rendell Mysteries | Julius Sorensen | Episodes: "Bribery & Corruption: Parts One & Two" |
| 1998 | Only Love | Dallesandro | Television film |
| 1998–2002 | ER | Dr. Charles Corday | 3 episodes |
| 1999 | The Devil's Arithmetic | Rabbi | Television film |
| 1999 | The Dark Room | Adam Kingsley | 2 episodes |
| 2000 | Rough Treatment | Mr. Masters | Television film |
| 2000 | Inspector Morse | Frank Harrison | Episode: "The Remorseful Day" |
| 2002 | Fields of Gold | Sir James Ferneyhough | 2-part conspiracy thriller |
| 2002–2003 | Monarch of the Glen | Andrew Booth | Series 4 & 5; 11 episodes |
| 2004 | When I'm 64 | Ray | Television film |
| 2005 | Waking the Dead | Dr. Charles Hoyle | Episodes: "Straw Dog: Parts 1 & 2" |
| 2006 | Midsomer Murders | Sir John Waverley | Episode: "Down Among the Dead Men" |
| 2006 | A Ghost Story for Christmas: Number 13 | Mr. Harrington, Cathedral Archivist | Television film. Adaptation of the M. R. James short story |
| 2006–2007 | New Street Law | Laurence Scammel QC | Series 1 & 2; 14 episodes |
| 2007 | Diamond Geezer | Sergey | Miniseries; episode: "Old Gold" |
| 2007 | The Whistleblowers | Joseph Cole | Episodes: "Fit for Purpose" & "Environment" |
| 2007 | Hotel Babylon | Sir Christopher Price | Episode: #3.1 |
| 2008 | Agatha Christie's Poirot | Col. Carbury | Episode: "Appointment with Death" |
| 2009 | Lark Rise to Candleford | Old Edmund | Episode: #2.8 |
| 2009 | The Courageous Heart of Irena Sendler | Monsignor Godlewski | Television film |
| 2009 | Spanish Flu: The Forgotten Fallen | Sir Arthur Newsholme | Television film |
| 2010 | Spooks | Levi Cohen | Episode: #9.5 |
| 2012 | The Hollow Crown | Thomas Erpingham | Episode: "Henry V, Part 1" |
| 2012 | Strike Back | Peter Evans | Episodes: "Vengeance: Parts 5 & 6" |
| 2013 | The Bible | Samuel | Miniseries; episodes: "Homeland" & "Kingdom" |
| 2013 | Countdown to Murder | Tommy Cressman | Episode: "The Duchess, the Killer and Her Lover" |
| 2013 | Lucan | John Pearson | Miniseries; episode 1 |
| 2015 | Da Vinci's Demons | The Architect | Series 3; 4 episodes |
| 2016 | Tokyo Trial | William Donald Patrick, Lord Patrick | Miniseries; 4 episodes |
| 2017–2020 | Absentia | Warren Byrne | Seasons 1–3; 30 episodes |
| 2018 | A Very English Scandal | Sir Joseph Cantley | Miniseries; episode 3 |
| 2022 | The Man Who Fell to Earth | Gregory Papel | Episode: "Unwashed and Somewhat Slightly Dazed" |
| 2023 | Paris Christmas Waltz | Henry Fontaine | Television film |
| 2026 | Gone | Malcolm Sleighthome | Episode: #1.4 |
