= Winston Churchill: The Wilderness Years =

- DVD cover art
- Genre: Drama
- Written by: Ferdinand Fairfax, William Humble
- Directed by: Ferdinand Fairfax
- Starring: Robert Hardy; Siân Phillips; Nigel Havers; Tim Pigott-Smith; Eric Porter
- Country of origin: United Kingdom
- Original language: English
- No. of series: 1
- No. of episodes: 8

Production
- Executive producer: Mark Shivas
- Producer: Richard Broke
- Production company: Southern Television

Original release
- Network: ITV
- Release: 6 September – 25 October 1981

Winston Churchill: The Wilderness Years is an eight-part 1981 drama serial based on Winston Churchill's years in enforced exile from political position during the 1920s and 1930s. It was made by Southern Television on a budget of £3¼ million and originally broadcast on ITV on Sunday nights at 10 pm. It was written and directed by Ferdinand Fairfax, with historian Martin Gilbert as co-writer. Churchill was played by Robert Hardy, who earned a BAFTA nomination for Best Actor and went on to play him in several other productions.

== Plot summary ==
The series focuses on the decade from 1929 to 1939 during which Winston Churchill was out of power and out of favour. During that time he attempted to make his colleagues and countrymen aware of Nazi Germany's threat to Britain. He comes up against much resistance from fellow politicians Stanley Baldwin, Samuel Hoare and the appeasement policies of Neville Chamberlain. He faces problems not only in politics but at home as well.

== Episodes ==
No.	Title	Original release date
1	"Down and Out"	6 September 1981
Churchill resigns as Chancellor of the Exchequer after the Conservative Party under the leadership of Stanley Baldwin loses the 1929 election. He travels to the United States in an attempt to make some money. He meets with William Randolph Hearst and Bernard Baruch. He loses his earnings, however, in the Wall Street crash of 1929. Meanwhile, back at home, the Prime Minister and Baldwin plan to introduce democracy to India.
2	"Politics Are Foul"	13 September 1981
Baldwin sends for Churchill asking for his support in giving India dominion status, something Churchill is against. Churchill attacks Ramsay MacDonald in parliament and resigns from the shadow cabinet. The division in the Conservative party leads Baldwin to make a political deal with MacDonald. A general election is called for a national government and Churchill is not offered office. While in New York, he suffers an accident.
3	"In High Places"	20 September 1981
While in Germany, Churchill hopes to meet with Hitler. Samuel Hoare and Lord Derby become the centres of intrigue regarding a report from the cotton industry related to the India question. A witness seeks out Churchill. Brendan Bracken and Churchill have a falling-out.
4	"A Menace in The House"	27 September 1981
Armed with papers as evidence of Hoare's tampering with the cotton industry's report to parliament, the investigation begins and ends. Churchill is incensed with the result and suffers for it in the house. In France, Churchill is approached by Ralph Wigram with information about German re-armament.
5	"The Flying Peril"	4 October 1981
Churchill warns of Germany's re-arming and their air superiority over Britain. The MacDonald government falls. Churchill is again denied a cabinet position when the Conservatives return to power. He also must contend with troubles at home.
6	"His Own Funeral"	11 October 1981
King George dies and trouble looms with the new King's relationship with a divorced woman. Churchill loses popularity due to his support. Hitler occupies the Rhineland and Baldwin's cabinet continues to dawdle in any war preparations.
7	"The Long Tide of Surrender"	18 October 1981
Baldwin retires and Neville Chamberlain becomes Prime Minister. With Sir Horace Wilson as an aide, appeasement and reduction of defence spending is his policy. Chamberlain flies to the Munich Conference to meet with Hitler on Czechoslovakia.
8	"What Price Churchill"	25 October 1981
Hitler invades Czechoslovakia and then Poland. Chamberlain initially refuses to believe it is war but finally relents under pressure. He offers Churchill a place in the government.

== Cast ==
- Robert Hardy as Winston Churchill
- Siân Phillips as Clementine Churchill
- Katharine Levy as Mary Churchill
- Nigel Havers as Randolph Churchill
- Tim Pigott-Smith as Brendan Bracken
- David Swift as Professor Lindemann
- Sherrie Hewson as Mrs. Pearman
- Moray Watson as Major Desmond Morton
- Paul Freeman as Ralph Wigram
- Frank Middlemass as Lord Derby
- Sam Wanamaker as Bernard Baruch
- Peter Barkworth as Stanley Baldwin
- Eric Porter as Neville Chamberlain
- Edward Woodward as Sir Samuel Hoare
- Peter Vaughan as Sir Thomas Inskip
- Robert James as Ramsay MacDonald
- Tony Mathews as Anthony Eden
- Ian Collier as Harold Macmillan
- Marcella Markham as Nancy Astor
- Walter Gotell as Lord Swinton
- Richard Murdoch as Lord Halifax
- Clive Swift as Sir Horace Wilson
- Phil Brown as Lord Beaverbrook
- Diane Fletcher as Ava Wigram
- Geoffrey Toone as Sir Louis Kershaw
- Norman Jones as Clement Attlee
- Geoffrey Chater as Lord Hailsham
- Stratford Johns as Lord Rothermere
- Norman Bird as Sir Maurice Hankey
- Roger Bizley as Ernst Hanfstaengl
- James Cossins as Lord Lothian
- Guy Deghy as King George V
- Stephen Elliott as William Randolph Hearst
- Günter Meisner as Adolf Hitler
- Frederick Jaeger as Joachim von Ribbentrop
- David Langton as Lord Londonderry
- Preston Lockwood as Austen Chamberlain
- David Markham as the Duke of Marlborough
- Richard Marner as Ewald von Kleist-Schmenzin
- Llewellyn Rees as Lord Salisbury
- Terence Rigby as Thomas Barlow
- Margaret Courtenay as Maxine Elliott
- Merrie Lynn Ross as Marion Davies
- Nigel Stock as Admiral Domvile
- Paul McDowell as Butler at Chartwell

== Reception ==
Writing for The New York Times, Walter Goodman noted Hardy "gives a remarkable impersonation of Churchill", but wrote "Unfortunately, the impersonation does not quite rise to full characterization; at moments the mannerisms bury the human being beneath them." He summarized: "... drama-heightening liberties are the indispensable grease to this kind of vehicle; eight hours of speeches about the national peril and the shortage of aircraft could prove wearing even to Churchill buffs. Events and personalities are strained and strained again through the historian, the dramatist, the director, the actors. If the result works as well as it does here, if it does not distort events out of recognizable shape, if it brings the dead to a semblance of life, that is an accomplishment."

People magazine panned the series premiere as "an aimless and excruciatingly dull premiere of an eight-part miniseries... the production remains mired in a dramatic desert."

However, in 2016 Mark Lawson was far more favourable in The Guardian, ranking Hardy's portrayal as the second most memorable television representation of Churchill, beaten only by Albert Finney in The Gathering Storm. Lawson wrote: "With an acting style that tends towards the large, loud and posh, Hardy was destined to be one of those actors who seems to have spent almost as much of his life being Churchill as the man himself did. Among Hardy's armful of portrayals, this TV drama musically explores the politician's unusual rhetorical range from whisper to shout." An even more positive appraisal soon followed from Churchill biographer Andrew Roberts in The Spectator, who described Hardy's performance as "still the best depiction of Churchill on a screen." Hardy's intensive research into Churchill, Roberts concluded, "helped make the series the success it was, and set the standard for everything that followed."

It is said that while filming took place, Robert Hardy was so immersed portraying Churchill that, out of habit, he continued showing Churchillian gestures and mannerisms after work on the series had ended.

== Awards ==
Hardy's performance as Churchill won a BAFTA nomination in 1982. Eric Porter as Neville Chamberlain also received praise. The series was nominated for a total of 8 BAFTA awards, namely:

- Best Actor (Robert Hardy)
- Best Costume Design (Evangeline Harrison)
- Best Design (Roger Murray-Leach)
- Best Drama Series (Richard Broke/Ferdinand Fairfax)
- Best Film Cameraman (Norman G. Langley)
- Best Film Editor (Lesley Walker)
- Best Make Up (Christine Beveridge/Mary Hillman)
- Best Original Television Music (Carl Davis)

== Reprises ==
Hardy also portrayed Churchill in The Sittaford Mystery, Bomber Harris and War and Remembrance. At the 50th anniversary celebrations of the end of World War II in 1995, he quoted a number of Churchill's wartime speeches in character.
