= Desmond Morton =

Desmond Morton may refer to:

- Desmond Morton (civil servant) (1891–1971), British military officer and government official
- Desmond Morton (historian) (1937–2019), Canadian historian
