= The Life and Adventures of Nicholas Nickleby (2001 film) =

2001 television film directed by Stephen Whittaker

- DVD container
- Based on: Nicholas Nickleby by Charles Dickens
- Screenplay by: Martyn Hesford
- Directed by: Stephen Whittaker
- Starring: James D'Arcy; Sophia Myles; Diana Kent; Charles Dance; George Innes; Lee Ingleby; Gregor Fisher
- Music by: Colin Towns
- Country of origin: United Kingdom
- Original language: English

Production
- Producer: Nicolas Brown
- Cinematography: Sean Bobbitt
- Editor: Beverley Mills
- Production companies: Company Television; Nickleby TV Ltd.

Original release
- Release: 8 April 2001

The Life and Adventures of Nicholas Nickleby (a.k.a. Nicholas Nickleby) is a British TV film which aired in 2001, directed by Stephen Whittaker, based on the 1839 novel Nicholas Nickleby by Charles Dickens.

== Cast ==
- James D'Arcy as Nicholas Nickleby
- Sophia Myles as Kate Nickleby
- Diana Kent as Mrs. Nickleby
- Charles Dance as Ralph Nickleby
- George Innes as Newman Noggs
- Lee Ingleby as Smike
- Donald Sumpter as Mr. Brooker
- Gregor Fisher as Wackford Squeers
- Pam Ferris as Mrs. Squeers
- Debbie Chazen as Fanny Squeers
- Chris Roebuck as Wackford Squeers Junior
- Hannah Storey as Tilda Price
- Tom Ellis as John Browdie
- Berwick Kaler as Mr. Snawley
- Abigail McKern as Miss La Creevy
- Tom Hollander as Alfred Mantalini
- Marian McLoughlin as Madame Mantalini
- Rosalind March as Miss Knag
- Dominic West as Sir Mulberry Hawk
- Roderic Culver as Lord Verisopht
- Malcolm Tierney as Vincent Crummles
- Jacqueline Tong as Mrs. Crummles
- Ruth Chapman as Ninetta Crummles, The "Infant Phenomenon"
- Richard Katz as Mr. Lenville
- Jonathan Coy as Charles Cheeryble
- Simeon Andrews as Ned Cheeryble
- JJ Feild as Frank Cheeryble
- Frank Mills as Arthur Gride
- Liz Smith as Peg Sliderskew
- Katherine Holme as Madeleine Bray
- Philip Bond as Mr. Walter Bray
- Tom Hiddleston as Lord
- John Dallimore as Vicar

== Reviews ==
In Variety, "some striking performances" were noted from James D’Arcy with "just the right dashing look for a young romantic hero, and he can emit his character’s empathy without a single wasted expression. The phrase “lighting up the screen” comes to mind, which is rare"; Charles Dance made a contrast with the other, especially evil, "broadly played (and well done in that vein)" characters, showing Ralph's cruelty as "composed and real, enabling the final twists to take on a tragic, human quality". Gregor Fisher and Lee Ingleby were also praised.

In The Dickensian, the reviewer noted that the focus was concentrated on Ralph, "the centre of a maelstrom of intrigues, which swirl round all the characters", and that Charles Dance displayed "chilling, reptilian authority", with "a fine gang of rogues - a zestful, demonic Squeers (Gregor Fisher), a splendid Arthur Gride... (Frank Mills) and a bragging Mulberry Hawk (Dominic West)". He observed that Smike "was a very interesting creation [which] deftly steered the difficult course between pathos and mawkishness". He found that Stephen Whittaker "swept things along. Scene followed scene, and sequences flashed by as the drama was taken at a good rattling pace, appropriate to the high days of the stage coach", although he felt that "Climaxes might have been better prepared, relationships better established and some fine dialogue preserved".

== Awards ==
- Costume designer Barbara Kidd won a Royal Television Society Award in 2001, and a BAFTA in 2002 for her work on this film.
