= Diana Kent =

British actress

- Born: South Africa
- Occupation: Actress
- Years active: 1990–present
- Children: 2

Diana Kent is an English actress known for Heavenly Creatures (1994), How to Lose Friends & Alienate People (2008), One Day (2011) and for the ITV drama series Belgravia (2020).

== Career ==
=== Film ===
| Year | Title | Role | Notes |
|---|---|---|---|
| 1986 | The Happy Valley | Christmas Party Guest | TV movie |
| 1991 | Palmer | Miss Roberts | TV movie |
| 1994 | Heavenly Creatures | Hilda Hume | |
| 1997 | The Wings of the Dove | Merton's Party Companion | |
| 1999 | Runaway Bride | Hula Girl | |
| 2000 | Billy Elliot | Tutor 2 | |
| 2001 | Morlang | Ellen Morlang | |
| 2005 | Brothers of the Head | Laura Ashworth | |
| 2008 | How to Lose Friends & Alienate People | Rachel Petkoff | |
| 2009 | Margaret | Margaret King | |
| 2011 | One Day | Mrs Cope | |
| 2011 | Turnout | Sophie's Mother | |
| 2011 | The Awakening | Harriet Cathcart | |
| 2014 | A Long Way Down | Hope | |
| 2015 | Suite Française | Madame Michaud | |
| 2020 | The Voice of Sin | Sophie Morris | Japanese film |
| 2021 | The Last Letter from Your Lover | Older Jennifer | |

=== Television ===
| Year | Title | Role | Notes |
|---|---|---|---|
| 1989 - 1996 | Screen Two | Alison Hanratty / Night Nurse | TV series |
| 1990 | Capital City | Barbara | Episode: "A Wolf in Wolf's Clothing" |
| 1991 | Waterfront Beat | Hazel | Episode: "E.P.O.S. |
| 1991 | Bergerac | Diana | Episode: "Warriors" |
| 1991 | Agatha Christie's Poirot | Zoe Havering | Episode: "The Mystery of Hunter's Lodge" |
| 1991 | Paul Merton: The Series | | TV series |
| 1994 | Seaforth | Diana Stacey | TV mini-series, 6 episodes |
| 1995 | Goodnight Sweetheart | Jayne Mansfield | TV series |
| 1995 - 1996 | The Vet | Patrica Lennox | TV series |
| 1995 - 2010 | The Bill | Ruth Pearce / Sue Tolliver | TV series |
| 1997 | The Beggar Bride | Ffiona Ormerod | TV series |
| 1998 | Close Relations | Dierdra | TV series |
| 2000 | Jason and the Argonauts | Polymele | TV series |
| 2000 | Heartbeat | Jennifer Bennet | Episode: "Gabriel's Last Stand" |
| 2001 | Band of Brothers | Mrs. Lamb | Episode: "Carentan" |
| 2001 | The Life and Adventures of Nicholas Nickleby | Mrs. Nickleby | |
| 2004 | Murder City | Ellen Vasseur | Episode: "Big City Small World" |
| 2004 | Midsomer Murders | Anne Heldman | Episode: "The Fisher King" |
| 2004 - 2018 | Holby City | Blanche Valentine / Barbara Armstrong | TV series |
| 2005 | Elizabeth I | Lady Essex | TV mini series |
| 2007 | Silent Witness | Marie Williams | TV series |
| 2008 | Messiah: The Rapture | Helen Waite | TV mini series |
| 2011 | Casualty | Jennifer Mayer | TV series |
| 2011 | The Jury | Registrar | TV series |
| 2012 | World Without End | Rose | TV series |
| 2012 | Titanic | Eleanor Widener | TV mini series |
| 2014 | The Missing | Penny | TV series |
| 2013 | M.I.High | Margery / Jemima Thursday | TV mini series |
| 2013 | Whitechapel | Jacqui Brierley | TV mini series |
| 2014 | Undeniable | Isobel Hendrie | TV series |
| 2014 | The Missing | Penny | TV series |
| 2015 | Finding Jesus: Faith. Fact. Forgery | Helena | TV series documentary |
| 2018 | Father Brown | Lady Rose | Episode: "The Dance of Death" |
| 2019 | Mother Father Son | Charlotte | TV series |
| 2020 | Belgravia | The Duchess of Richmond | TV series |

=== Theatre ===
| Year | Title | Role | Writer | Director | Notes |
|---|---|---|---|---|---|
| 1991 | Les Liaisons Dangereuses | M. de Merteuil | Pierre Choderlos de Laclos | David Leveaux | Ambassadors Theatre, London |
| 1992 | An Inspector Calls | Sheila | J. B. Priestley | Stephen Daldry | Royal National Theatre, London |
| 1998 | Robert Zucco | Elegant Lady | Bernard-Marie Koltes | James McDonald | Royal Shakespeare Theatre, London |
| 1999 | Talk of the City | Daphne | Terry John-Bates | Stephen Poliakoff | Swan Theatre, Stratford-upon-Avon |
| 2000 | Arcadia | Hannah | Tom Stoppard | Rupert Goold | Salisbury Playhouse, Salisbury |
| 2001 | The Prisoner's Dilemma | Floss | David Edgar | Michael Attenborough | Royal Shakespeare Company, London |
| 2001 | Love in a Wood | Lady Flippant | William Wycherley | Tim Supple | Swan Theatre, Stratford-upon-Avon |
| 2003 | Caligula | Caesonia | Albert Camus | Michael Grandage | Donmar Warehouse, London |
| 2005 | Phaedra's Love | Phaedra | Sarah Kane | Anne Tipton | Bristol Old Vic, Bristol & Barbican Centre, London |
| 2007 | Lovely and Misfit | Miss Fenway | Tennessee Williams | Anna Ledwich | Fishwick Productions |
| 2008 | Breaking the Silence | Eugenia | Lorae Parry | Esther Richardson | Nottingham Playhouse, Nottingham |
| 2008 | Carousel | Miss Mullins | Rodgers and Hammerstein | Lindsey Posner | Stanhope Productions |
| 2009 | All My Sons | Kate Keller | Arthur Miller | Walter Meierjohann | Leicester Curve Theatre, Leicester |
| 2011 | The Heresy of Love | Madre Marguerita | Helen Edmundson | Nancy Meckler | Swan Theatre, Stratford-upon-Avon |
| 2014 | Long Day's Journey into Night | Mary Tyrone | Eugene O'Neill | Tony Cownie | Lyceum Theatre, Edinburgh |
| 2015 | Tomcat | Caroline | James Rushbrooke | Kate Hewitt | Southwark Playhouse, London |
