= Priest (1994 film) =

1994 film by Antonia Bird

- Theatrical release poster
- Directed by: Antonia Bird
- Written by: Jimmy McGovern
- Produced by: George Faber; Josephine Ward
- Starring: Linus Roache; Tom Wilkinson; Robert Carlyle; Cathy Tyson
- Cinematography: Fred Tammes
- Edited by: Susan Spivey
- Music by: Andy Roberts
- Production company: BBC Films
- Distributed by: Electric Pictures; PolyGram Filmed Entertainment
- Release dates: August 1994 (Edinburgh International Film Festival); 12 September 1994; Toronto International Film Festival
- Running time: 108 minutes (UK); 98 minutes (US)
- Country: United Kingdom
- Language: English
- Box office: $6 million (US/UK)

Priest is a 1994 British drama film directed by Antonia Bird. The screenplay by Jimmy McGovern concerns a Roman Catholic priest (Linus Roache) as he struggles with two difficulties that precipitate a crisis of faith. The film's release was controversial and received condemnation from the Church.

The film won the People's Choice Award at the 19th Toronto International Film Festival.

== Plot ==
Father Greg Pilkington, newly assigned to St Mary's parish in inner-city Liverpool, is startled to discover Father Matthew Thomas is engaged in a sexual relationship with rectory housekeeper Maria Kerrigan. Moreover, Father Thomas is a left-wing radical and an outspoken proponent of Liberation Theology, leading him to constant clashes and bickering with the Bishop—who nevertheless appreciates his abilities.

While the young protagonist's personal traditional conservatism and religious beliefs are offended by the older priest's blatant disregard for his vow of celibacy, he struggles with his homosexual urges, especially after he meets a man named Graham at a local gay hangout and the two embark on a physical relationship.

Meanwhile, student Lisa Unsworth has confided she is being sexually abused by her father, who confirms her story and displays no guilt nor any desire to stop. Both have revealed their secret in the confessional, however, so Father Greg is required to honour the sanctity of the Sacrament of Penance and not reveal what he has been told. He tries to warn her mother to keep a close watch on her, but the naive woman believes her daughter is safe while in the care of her husband.

When Mrs. Unsworth discovers her husband molesting Lisa and realises the priest knew what was happening, she lashes out at him. Adding to his torment is his arrest for having sex with Graham in a parked car. He pleads guilty to the charge, and the fact that he is a Catholic priest makes for a sensational news item. The story is headlined on the front page of the local newspaper and, unable to face his parishioners, Father Greg relocates to a remote rural parish headed by a disapproving and unforgiving priest. Father Matthew persuades him to return to St Mary's, and the two preside over a Mass that is disrupted by the loud protests of people opposed to Father Greg's presence at the altar. Father Matthew demands they leave the church. The two priests then begin to distribute the Eucharist, but the remaining parishioners ignore Father Greg and line up to receive communion from Father Matthew. Lisa finally approaches the younger priest, and the two fall into each other's arms, sobbing.

== Cast ==
- Linus Roache as Father Greg Pilkington
- Tom Wilkinson as Father Matthew Thomas
- Robert Carlyle as Graham
- Cathy Tyson as Maria Kerrigan
- Christine Tremarco as Lisa Unsworth
- Robert Pugh as Mr. Unsworth
- Lesley Sharp as Mrs. Unsworth

== Production ==
The film was shot on location in Blundellsands, Liverpool, London, and Manchester.

== Release ==
Priest premiered at the Toronto International Film Festival in September 1994 and was one of the most talked about films. Miramax acquired the US distribution rights for $1.75 million and spent a further $500,000 on prints and advertising. The film received very vocal condemnation from the Church, with the Catholic Church in Ireland in particular calling for a ban on theatrical distribution. This marked the first major disagreement between the Church and the Irish Film Censor Board, which decided to release it anyway. It went into general release in the UK on 17 March 1995 and limited release on 8 screens in the US the following week. Catholic organizations in the United States, including the Catholic League and the American Life League, were in an uproar over its planned nationwide release by Miramax during Easter weekend, calling the film "smut," "blasphemous" and "sacrilegious"; staged a national boycott over Miramax parent, Walt Disney Studios; demanded that the film be withdrawn and called for Disney president Michael Eisner to be fired. Exhibitors in New Jersey received threats, including bomb threats, and warning against screening the film.

== Reception ==
=== Critical reception ===
Rotten Tomatoes gave the film a 64% approval rating based on 25 critical responses, with an average rating of 7/10.

Roger Ebert of the Chicago Sun-Times rated the film one star out of a possible four, calling the screenplay "shallow and exploitative." He added, "The movie argues that the hidebound and outdated rules of the church are responsible for some people (priests) not having sex although they should, while others (incestuous parents) can keep on having it although they shouldn't. For this movie to be described as a moral statement about anything other than the filmmaker's prejudices is beyond belief."

Peter Stack of the San Francisco Chronicle called it "an exceptional movie," "powerful drama," and "a curiously inspiring statement about faith and morality." He added, "This film is extraordinary for the themes it explores—sometimes with delicious humor—beyond the obvious ... The movie becomes a fascinating glimpse at a vast subject—intolerance vs. understanding. There's some preachiness in Priest, and yet you go away feeling the embrace of something lovely and spiritual."

Gary Kamiya of The San Francisco Examiner observed, "After watching this film, you feel as if Martin Luther had hammered every one of his 95 theses onto various parts of your anatomy, using dull thumbtacks. And although Priest is not without intelligence, humor and pathos, in the end it's little more than a tendentious melodrama. One can sympathize with [its] progressive politics ... and still feel that director Antonia Bird and screenwriter Jimmy McGovern have made things much too easy for themselves ... Priest is less a work of art than an Op-ed piece; as such, whatever virtues it has existed in the sociological sphere, not the aesthetic."

Rita Kempley of The Washington Post said, "Part soap opera and part propaganda, this sometimes affecting drama presents a one-sided examination of the church's teachings on homosexuality and the celibacy of its clergy ... Roache, a veteran of British stage and television, gives a stirring performance, which crests in the film's transcendent finale. Beautifully sustained by the actors and well directed by Bird, this last scene is an emotional epiphany for both the characters and the audience, all bathed in the balm of forgiveness."

=== Box office ===
Opening on eight screens in the United States, it grossed $113,430 on its opening weekend, and eventually grossed $4,165,845 in the US and Canada. In the UK, the film grossed £1,047,215.

== Accolades ==
The film was nominated for the BAFTA Award for Best British Film but lost to Shallow Grave. It won the People's Choice Award at the 1994 Toronto International Film Festival, was named Best New British Feature at the 1994 Edinburgh International Film Festival, and won the Teddy Award at the 1995 Berlin International Film Festival.
