= Linus Roache =

British actor (born 1964)

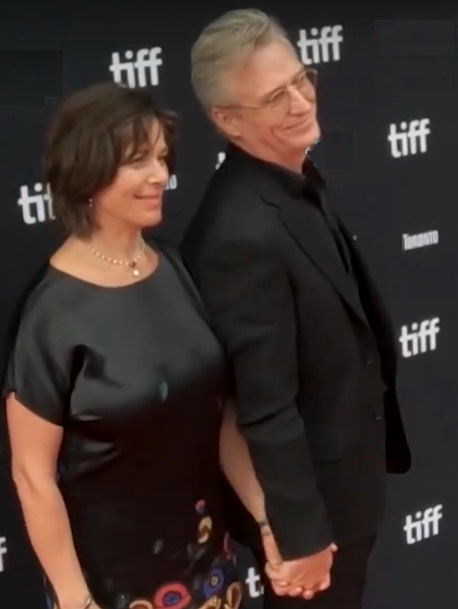
- Roache with his wife Rosalind Bennett at Tiff 2022
- Born: Linus William Roache; 1 February 1964 (age 62); Manchester, England
- Education: Royal Central School of Speech and Drama
- Occupation: Actor
- Years active: 1973–1976, 1985–present
- Spouse: Rosalind Bennett (m. 2002)
- Parents: William Roache (father); Anna Cropper (mother)
- Relatives: James Roache (half-brother)

Linus William Roache (born 1 February 1964) is a British actor. He is best known to American audiences as Executive ADA Michael Cutter in the NBC dramas Law & Order (2008–2010) and Law & Order: Special Victims Unit (2011–2012), and also played Ecbert, King of Wessex in Vikings from 2014 to 2017.

He was nominated for a Golden Globe Award for playing Robert F. Kennedy in RFK (2002), won a Peabody Award for his role as Senator Wesley Smith in Fellow Travelers (2023), and won a Satellite Award for Best Supporting Actor (TV) for his role as Ralph Wigram in The Gathering Storm (2002). His film appearances include Priest (1994), The Wings of the Dove (1997), Van Gogh (1991), Pandaemonium (2000), The Chronicles of Riddick (2004), Batman Begins (2005), Non-Stop (2014) and Mandy (2018). In 2018 and 2020, he had a recurring role in the final two seasons of Homeland.

== Early life ==
Roache was born in Manchester, England, the son of Coronation Street actor William Roache and actress Anna Cropper. Roache was educated at Bishop Luffa School in Chichester, West Sussex, and at Rydal School in Colwyn Bay in north Wales. He studied acting at the Central School of Speech and Drama.

== Career ==
From 1973 to 1975, Roache appeared in Coronation Street as Peter Barlow, the son of his father's character Ken Barlow. Roache is also a past member of the Royal Shakespeare Company.

In the 1990s, Roache began a career in films while remaining active in television and on stage. In 1994 he took a leading role in Antonia Bird's Priest. In 1997, he starred opposite Helena Bonham Carter in the film The Wings of the Dove. In 2001, he won the Evening Standard British Film Award for Best Actor, for his performance as Samuel Taylor Coleridge in the Julien Temple directed film Pandaemonium alongside Samantha Morton. In 2005, he played Thomas Wayne, father of Batman, in Batman Begins. On television, he played Executive Assistant District Attorney Michael Cutter in two American series: Law & Order (2008–2010), and Law & Order: Special Victims Unit (2011–2012).

In June 2010, it was announced that he would return to play Lawrence Cunningham, the other son of Ken, in Coronation Street. The following month, Roache was cast in the HBO pilot The Miraculous Year. In April 2011, Roache was cast as the lead in the ITV miniseries Titanic, airing in March and April 2012 to coincide with the 100th anniversary of the sinking of the ship. In February 2014, Roache debuted in season two of the TV series Vikings as Ecbert, King of Wessex. He starred in seasons seven and eight of the TV series Homeland as David Wellington in 2017–2019. Since then, he starred as Senator Wesley Smith on Showtime's Peabody Award-winning miniseries Fellow Travelers.

== Personal life ==
After appearing in 1994's Priest and Seaforth, Roache took a break from acting. He stayed in India for 18 months, where he discovered meditation. He married actress Rosalind Bennett in Malvern Hills, Worcestershire, in 2002.

== Filmography ==
=== Film ===
Year	Title	Role	Notes	Ref.
1985	No Surrender	Ulster Boy		
1986	Link	Unknown	Uncredited	
1994	Priest	Father Greg Pilkington		
1997	The Wings of the Dove	Merton Densher		
1999	Venice Project	Count Jacko/Count Giaccomo		
1999	Siam Sunset	Perry		
2000	Best	Denis Law		
2000	Pandaemonium	Samuel Taylor Coleridge	Evening Standard British Film Award for Best Actor	
2002	Hart's War	Capt. Peter A. Ross		
2003	Beyond Borders	Henry Bauford		
2003	Blind Flight	John McCarthy	Nominated—BAFTA Scotland Award for Best Actor in a Scottish Film	
2004	The Forgotten	Mr. Shineer, A Friendly Man		
2004	The Chronicles of Riddick	Purifier		
2005	12 and Holding	Mr. Carges		
2005	Batman Begins	Dr. Thomas Wayne		
2006	A Through M	The Voice of the Party		
2006	Find Me Guilty	Sean Kierney		
2006	The Namesake	Mr. Lawson		
2007	Broken Thread	Ram		
2008	Before the Rains	Henry Moores		
2008	Yonkers Joe	Teddy		
2009	Out Here in the Fields: The Field on Beach Lane	Narrator		
2012	$upercapitalist	Mark Patterson		
2013	Innocence	Miles Warner		
2014	Non-Stop	Captain David McMillan		
2016	ID2: Shadwell Army	Vinnie		
2016	Barry	Bill Baughman		
2017	Division 19	Charles Lynden		
2018	Mandy	Jeremiah Sand		
2019	The Last Full Measure	Whit Peters		
2019	A Call to Spy	Maurice Buckmaster		
2022	My Policeman	Older Tom Burgess		
2022	The Apology	Jack Kingsley		
2026	The Dresden Sun	Malik		

=== Television ===
Year	Title	Role	Notes	Ref.
1973–1975	Coronation Street	Peter Barlow	Recurring role	
1976	The Onedin Line	Boy	Episode "Quarantine"	
1990	Omnibus	Vincent van Gogh	Episode: "Van Gogh"	
1994	Seaforth	Bob Longman	9 episodes	
1998	Shot Through the Heart	Vlado Selimovic	Television film	
2002	RFK	Robert F. Kennedy	Television film Nominated—Golden Globe Award for Best Actor – Miniseries or Television Film	
2002	The Gathering Storm	Ralph Wigram	Television film Satellite Award for Best Supporting Actor – Series, Miniseries or Television Film	
2006	The Ten Commandments	Aaron	2 episodes	
2006–2007	Kidnapped	Andy Archer	13 episodes	
2008–2010	Law & Order	Executive ADA Michael Cutter	Main role (seasons 18–20); 63 episodes	
2010	Coronation Street	Lawrence Cunningham	4 episodes	
2011–2012	Law & Order: Special Victims Unit	Bureau Chief ADA Michael Cutter	4 episodes	
2012	Titanic	Hugh, Earl of Manton	4 episodes	
2012	The Making of a Lady	Lord Walderhurst	Television film	
2014	The Blacklist	The Kingmaker	Episode: "The Kingmaker"	
2014–2017	Vikings	King Ecbert of Wessex	26 episodes	
2017	Bancroft	Tim Fraser	2 episodes	
2017–2020	Homeland	David Wellington	23 episodes	
2019	Summer of Rockets	Richard Shaw MP	6 episodes	
2023	Fellow Travelers	Senator Wesley Smith	8 episodes	
2025	Doctor Who	Reginald Pye	Episode: "Lux"	

== Selected theatre ==
- Tom Wingfield in The Glass Menagerie by Tennessee Williams. Directed by Ian Hastings at the Royal Exchange, Manchester (1989)
- The title role in Richard II. Directed by James Macdonald at the Royal Exchange, Manchester (1993)

== Awards and nominations ==
Year	Award	Category	Nominated work	Result	Ref.
1996	Chlotrudis Society for Independent Films	Best Actor	Priest	Nominated	
2001	Evening Standard British Film Awards	Best Actor	Pandaemonium	Won	
2003	60th Golden Globe Awards	Best Performance in a Miniseries or Television Film	RFK	Nominated	
2003	7th Golden Satellite Awards	Satellite Award for Best Supporting Actor – Series, Miniseries or Television Film	The Gathering Storm	Won	
2004	BAFTA Awards, Scotland	Best Actor in a Scottish Film	Blind Flight	Nominated	
2018	Fright Meter Awards	Best Supporting Actor	Mandy	Nominated	
2019	Fangoria Chainsaw Awards	Best Supporting Actor	Mandy	Nominated	
2019	CinEuphoria Awards	Best Supporting Actor - International	Mandy	Won	
2023	Peabody Awards	Chronicling LGBTQ+ History Over 50 Years	Fellow Travelers	Won	
