= Squillo (film) =

- Directed by: Carlo Vanzina
- Written by: Carlo Vanzina; Enrico Vanzina; Franco Ferrini
- Produced by: Giovanni Di Clemente
- Starring: Raz Degan; Jennifer Driver; Paul Freeman
- Cinematography: Luigi Kuveiller
- Edited by: Sergio Montanari
- Music by: Pino Donaggio
- Release date: 25 October 1996
- Running time: 90 minutes
- Country: Italy
- Language: Italian

Squillo (also known as Call Girl) is a 1996 Italian giallo film directed by Carlo Vanzina.

== Cast ==
- Raz Degan as Inspector Tony Messina
- Jennifer Driver as Maria
- Paul Freeman as Marco
- Bianca Koedam as Eva
- Antonio Ballerio as Fabio
- Alessandra Chiti as Sonja Rassimov
- Pia Klover as Barbara
- Luigi Montini as Superintendent Simoni
- Yanai Degan as Salvatore
- Caterina Rebracca as Rita
- Cyrus Elias as the Hotel receptionist
