= Ava Anderson, Viscountess Waverley =

20th-century English political and social hostess

Ava Anderson
- Viscountess Waverly
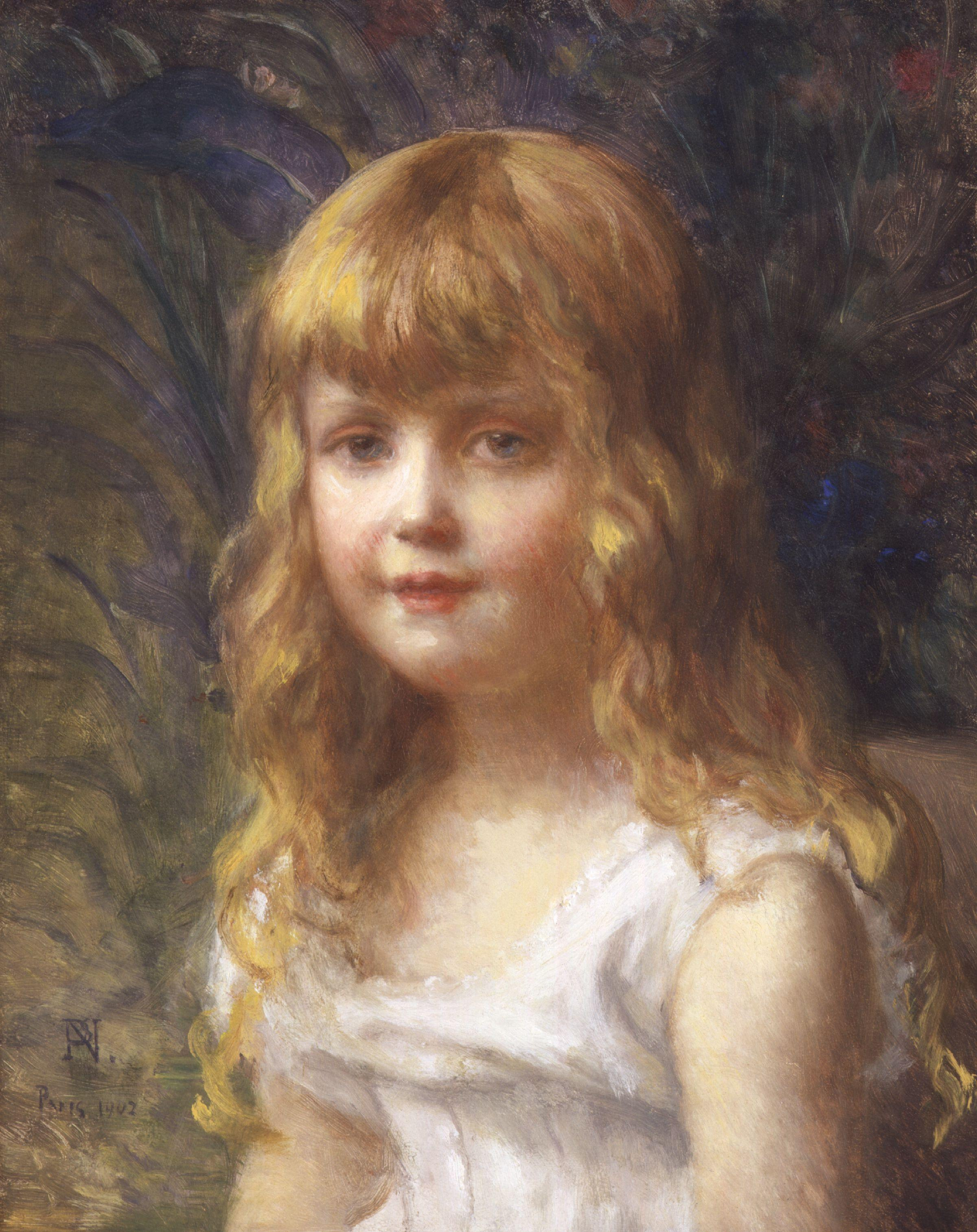
- by Napoleone Parisani in 1902
- Born: Alix Yveline Ava Courtenay Bodley; 12 December 1895; France
- Died: 22 December 1974 (aged 79); Seaford
- Spouses: Ralph Wigram; John Anderson, 1st Viscount Waverley
- Issue: Charles Edward Thomas Bodley Wigram
- Father: John Edward Courtenay Bodley
- Mother: Evelyn Frances Bell

Ava Anderson, Viscountess Waverley (formerly Wigram, née Bodley; 12 December 1895 – 22 December 1974), styled as Lady Anderson from 1941 until 1952, was an English political and social hostess at the centre of government during the Second World War. Winston Churchill noted "her contact with gt. affairs". It was said that she had "more indirect influence than any woman of her generation".

== Life ==
Waverley was born in France to Evelyn Frances (born Bell) and John Edward Courtenay Bodley. Her grandfather was John Bell and her cousin was the adventurer Gertrude Bell. Her brother was the writer R. V. C. Bodley and another brother was the artist Josselin Reginald Courtenay Bodley. She was painted in 1902 and that painting is in London's National Portrait Gallery. She was brought up in France where her father was based. She met talented diplomat Ralph Wigram in Algiers where he was on holiday from his position of First Secretary at the British Embassy in Paris. They married in 1925 and his career was advanced by her communication and entertaining skills.

Her life became focused on her husband after he contracted polio in 1927 and two years later she gave birth to a son who had significant disabilities. She continued to care for both of them and Winston Churchill later wrote that she "kept him alive" and that he "was her contact with gt. affairs". Her husband is credited by some with leaking key information to Churchill before he returned to power enabling Churchill to be aware of Hitler's rearmament.

When her husband died in 1936 she continued to entertain and network. It was said that she was welcome at any of the London embassies as well as at great houses like Arundel Castle and Belvoir Castle. Within two years she had found a new admirer in quiet Sir John Anderson. She was the socialite and he was stand-offish but entranced by Ava. He was at the centre of government during the Second World War and when they married in 1941 he was one of the top four politicians in the country. She had the empathetic skills that her husband lacked, and Churchill noted that he found her useful. Some referred to her husband as the "Home Prime Minister" and his jobs included leading the Home Office and being the Chancellor of the Exchequer. The Anderson shelter was named after him.

In 1946 her husband was involved with the opera and the reconstruction of the London Docks. She served on a few committees but her talent for entertaining was more important. Her husband helped to care for her son who died in 1951. She became Viscountess Waverley when her husband became a Viscount the following year. He died in 1958.

Lady Waverley became a noted correspondent keeping up with events in France and Italy. She was a close and sympathetic friend to Harold Macmillan.

Waverley died in Seaford in 1974 and was buried with her son. The Times said that she "probably exercise[d] more indirect influence than any woman of her generation". She left many letters, unlike her second husband who was noted for writing very little.

She was portrayed by Diane Fletcher in Winston Churchill: The Wilderness Years and by Lena Headey in The Gathering Storm.
