= Morlang =

2001 English-language Dutch drama film

- Theatrical release poster
- Directed by: Tjebbo Penning
- Screenplay by: Tjebbo Penning; Ruud Schuurman; Matthew Faulk; Mark Skeet
- Produced by: Petra Goedings
- Starring: Paul Freeman; Diana Kent; Susan Lynch
- Cinematography: Han Wennink
- Edited by: J.P. Luijsterburg
- Music by: Han Otten; Wiebe de Boer
- Production company: Phanta Vision Film International
- Distributed by: Buena Vista International
- Release date: 20 September 2001
- Running time: 93 minutes
- Country: Netherlands
- Language: English

Morlang is a 2001 English-language Dutch drama film directed by Tjebbo Penning, starring Paul Freeman, Diana Kent and Susan Lynch.

The film was released on 20 September 2001 by Buena Vista International.

== Cast ==
- Paul Freeman as Julius Morlang
- Diana Kent as Ellen
- Susan Lynch as Ann
- Eric van der Donk as Wim Giel
- Marcel Faber as Robert Jansen
- Huib Broos as Peter
- Porgy Franssen as Doctor

== Release ==
=== Home media ===
The film was released on DVD and VHS on 20 November 2002 by Buena Vista Home Entertainment though the Hollywood Pictures Home Video label.

=== Accolades ===
Accolades received by Morlang
Year	Award	Category	Recipient(s)	Result	Ref.
2001	Netherlands Film Festival	Golden Calf for Best Script	Ruud Schuurman; Tjebbo Penning	Nominated	
