= R. V. C. Bodley =

British Army officer (1892–1970)

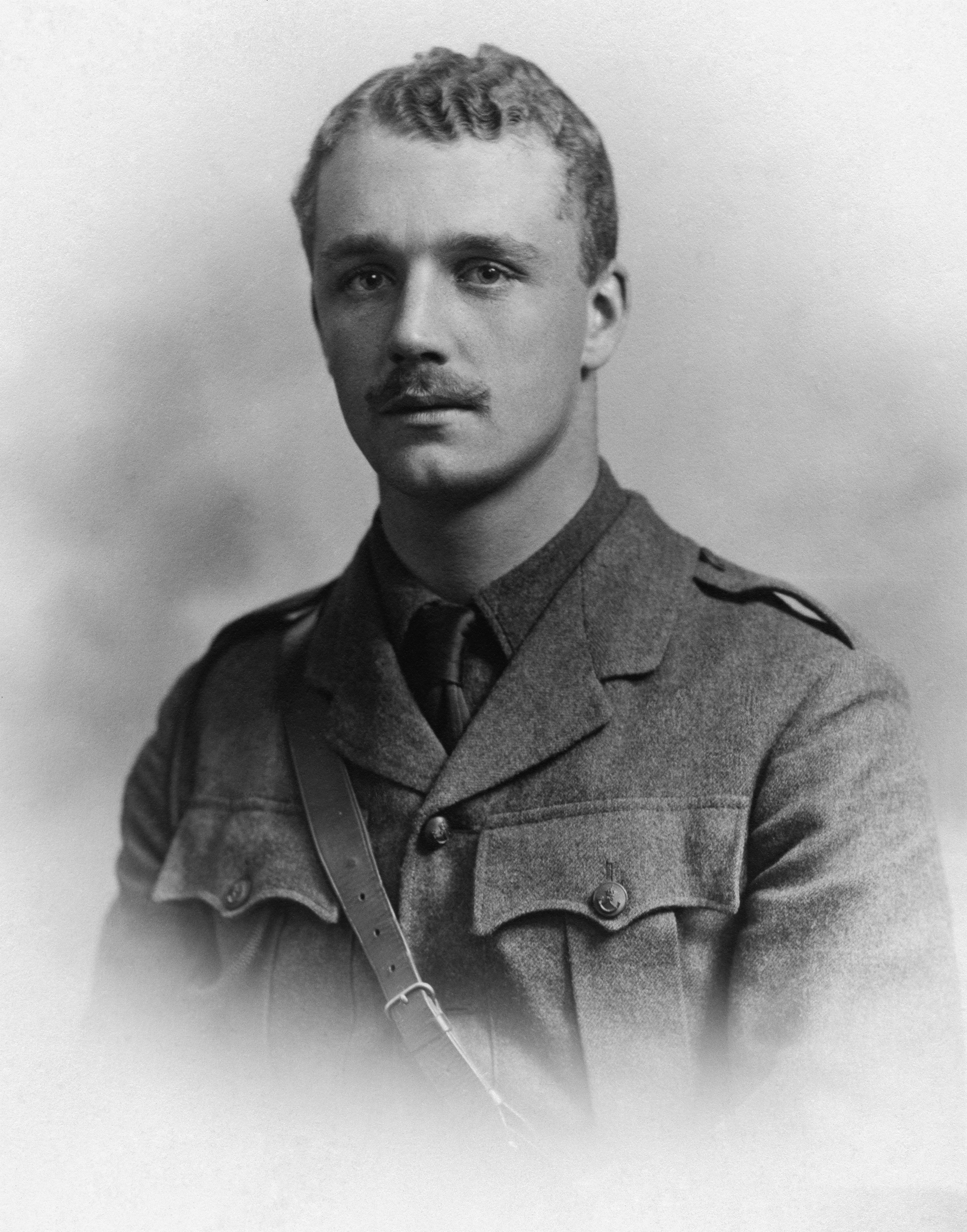
- R. V. C. Bodley, c. 1914
- Born: Ronald Victor Courtenay Bodley; 3 March 1892; Paris, France
- Died: 26 May 1970 (aged 78); Bramley, Surrey, England
- Relatives: John Edward Courtenay Bodley (father)
- Military career
- Allegiance: United Kingdom
- Branch: United Kingdom
- Service years: 1911–1919; 1939–1943
- Rank: Major
- Conflicts: First World War; Second World War
- Awards: Military Cross; Legion of Honour (France); Order of the Black Star (France); Order of the Crown (Romania); Order of Wen-Hu (China)
- Other work: Author, screenwriter

Ronald Victor Courtenay Bodley, MC (3 March 1892 – 26 May 1970) was a British Army officer, author and journalist. Born to English parents in Paris, he lived in France until he was nine, before attending Eton College and then the Royal Military College, Sandhurst. He was commissioned in the King's Royal Rifle Corps and served with them during the First World War. After the war he spent seven years in the Sahara desert, and then travelled through Asia. Bodley wrote several books about his travels. He was considered among the most distinguished British writers on the Sahara, as well as one of the main western sources of information on the South Seas Mandate.

Bodley moved to the United States in 1935, where he worked as a screenwriter. He rejoined the British Army at the outbreak of the Second World War and was sent to Paris to work for the Ministry of Information. He later immigrated to the United States, where he continued to work as a writer and also as an advisor to the United States Office of War Information.

== Early life and First World War ==
Bodley was born in Paris on 3 March 1892 to civil servant and writer John Edward Courtenay Bodley and Evelyn Frances Bodley (née Bell). He was the oldest of three children; his brother Josselin and sister Ava were born in 1893 and 1896 respectively. His parents divorced in 1908. Bodley was a descendant of diplomat and scholar Sir Thomas Bodley, founder of the Bodleian Library, and was, through his mother, a cousin of Gertrude Bell, a writer and archaeologist who helped establish the Hashemite dynasties. He lived in France with his parents until he was nine. His grandfather owned a Turkish palace in Algiers, which Bodley often visited as a child.

Bodley was educated at a Lycée in Paris before he was sent to Eton College and then to the Royal Military College, Sandhurst. Bodley showed interest as a writer; he wrote poetry at Eton and for a cadet magazine at Sandhurst. From Sandhurst he was commissioned in the King's Royal Rifle Corps as a second lieutenant in September 1911. He spent three years serving in a regiment in British India where he began to write and stage plays. His commanding officer once remarked "The plays are amusing. You're a credit to the regiment and all that, but did you join the army to become a soldier or a comedian?" Shortly thereafter the First World War broke out, and Bodley was sent to the Western Front for four years. He was wounded several times, including by poison gas. At the age of 26 he was given the rank of lieutenant colonel and command of a battalion. He was appointed assistant military attaché to Paris on 15 August 1918, and attended the 1919 Paris Peace Conference. What he heard there reportedly made him feel that he and the millions of other soldiers had fought for nothing; he wrote later that "selfish politicians [were] laying the groundwork for the Second World War – each country grabbing all it could for itself, creating national antagonisms, and reviving the intrigues of secret." Disillusioned with the military, Bodley considered a career in politics on the advice of the Prime Minister, David Lloyd George.

Gertrude Bell introduced Bodley to T. E. Lawrence. Bodley met Lawrence one day outside the Paris Peace Conference and told him of his intent to move into politics. Lawrence responded furiously, calling him a moron and a traitor. When he replied that he had no other prospects now that the war was over and asked what he should do, Lawrence suggested: "Go live with the Arabs." Bodley said his conversation with Lawrence, which lasted "less than 200 seconds", proved to be life-changing. He promptly sorted his affairs, and with a total of £300 and no prospects of further income, went to live in the Sahara. His bemused friends held him a farewell party. They all agreed he would be back in six weeks; he stayed in the Sahara for seven years.

== Travels through the Sahara and Asia ==
Bodley spent his seven years in the Sahara Desert living with a nomad Bedouin tribe. He purchased a herd of sheep and goats and used them as a source of income, hiring 10 shepherds to care for his flock. He wore Arab dress, spoke Arabic, practised the Muslim faith and abstained from alcohol; Bodley continued to be a non-drinker after leaving the Sahara. He left the tribe on the advice of its chief, who told him there was no use in continuing to pretend to be an Arab. In 1927 he wrote Algeria from Within, after being encouraged to do so by publisher Michael Joseph. The book is based on his experiences living in French Algeria. The book's success greatly exceeded his expectations, prompting him to continue writing. His first novel, Yasmina, was published later that year; it sold well and was reprinted. His next novel, Opal Fire, published the following year, was a commercial failure, but this did not discourage him from continuing to write. Bodley regarded his time in the Sahara as "the most peaceful and contented years" of his life. He was considered among the most distinguished British writers on the Sahara.

"One of the strongest impressions I had when I lived with the Arabs, was the 'everyday-ness' of God. He ruled their eating, their travelling, their business, their loving. He was their hourly thought, their closest friend, in a way impossible to people whose God is separated from them by the rites of formal worship."

— Ronald Bodley, commenting on life in the Sahara

After leaving the Sahara, Bodley spent three months in Java working on a tea plantation, before travelling to China and Japan. The success of Algeria from Within made it easy for him to obtain work as a journalist in Asia. He became a foreign correspondent for The Sphere in London and The Advertiser in Australia. Bodley was one of several westerners to be granted access to the South Seas Mandate by Japan in the 1930s, and he has been cited as one of the main sources of information on the area at the time. The South Seas Mandate consisted of islands in the north Pacific Ocean that had been within the German colonial empire until occupied by Japan during World War I; Japan governed the islands under a League of Nations mandate. Like other westerners allowed to visit the region, he reported that there was no evidence that Japan was militarising the area. Bodley's movements were "carefully choreographed" by the Japanese Foreign Ministry. He wrote about his experiences and findings in his 1934 book The Drama in the Pacific, saying that "having visited practically every island … I am convinced that nothing has been done to convert any place into a naval base". In his 1998 book Nan'yo: the Rise and Fall of the Japanese in Micronesia, 1885–1945, Mark Peattie stated that while it is easy to accuse Bodley and the other writers of naivety, the militarisation of the area was complex and occurred in several stages. Bodley was a passenger aboard the ship Shizuoka Maru when it was wrecked on a reef north of Yap in April 1933. The vessel was lost, though there were no injuries. Bodley was offered a job teaching English at Keio University, and did so for nine months; he wrote about the experience in his 1933 book A Japanese Omelette. Bodley and Keio professor Eishiro Hori provided voluminous notes in the 1934 Japanese textbook version of Round the Red Lamp by Arthur Conan Doyle, and in 1935 Bodley published a biography of Tōgō Heihachirō.

== Later life ==
In 1935 Bodley moved to the United States to work as a screenwriter, leaving Japan aboard the Chichibu Maru. In October 1936 Bodley was hired by Charlie Chaplin to adapt the D. L. Murray novel Regency into a feature film. It was the first time Chaplin had hired someone to write a script; he had previously written his own scripts. Bodley had a rough draft ready by January 1937, and completed his work in March, but Chaplin abandoned the script in late May, in favour of another project he was working on. Bodley also worked on the script for the 1938 film A Yank at Oxford. In the United States, Bodley was known to his friends as "Ronnie" and was often referred to in the press as Bodley of Arabia.

When the Second World War commenced, Bodley immediately rejoined the King's Royal Rifle Corps and was given the rank of major. Regarded as too old for active service in the infantry, he was sent to work for the Ministry of Information in Paris. He was in Paris when the German army invaded in May 1940. According to the back cover of his book The Soundless Sahara, after the fall of Paris he went to work behind the German lines until he came under suspicion of the Gestapo, then escaped across the Pyrenees on foot. A 2013 biographical journal article on Bodley by William Snell of Keio University made no mention of this work or escape, instead saying that Bodley stayed with his mother and stepfather near Bayonne after the invasion. According to Snell, after his mother and stepfather refused to leave, Bodley and three other Britons entered Spain via car, with the aid of a friend of Bodley's who worked at the British embassy in Madrid. Snell concluded his article by saying that while Bodley's life was adventurous, he did tend to dramatise it at times. Bodley returned to the United States via Portugal. Upon his return he focused on a career in writing and lecturing. Bodley would go into complete isolation in order to write a book, spending about ten weeks to complete his work. He wrote several of his books in York Harbor, Maine. Bodley frequently gave lectures while travelling the United States, speaking in almost every state and referring to himself as "Colonel" or "Major". Having reached the mandatory age for retirement, he ceased to be a member of the British Army on 3 March 1943. By 1944 he had become a US citizen and was an advisor to the Arabic desk of the US Office of War Information.

In 1944 Bodley published Wind in the Sahara. By 1949 the book was in its seventh edition and had been translated into eight different languages. In 1945 he wrote the satirical novel The Gay Deserters, which was inspired by his flight from the German army. It was not well received; Robert Pick from the Saturday Review wrote "it isn't even humorous at all". Bodley later said that his talents as a writer lay in non-fiction, adding that of "the many novels (...) and several plays [he] had written, four were published and two produced, and all failed to arouse any interest." He wrote an essay entitled I Lived in the Garden of Allah, which was included in Dale Carnegie's 1948 self-help book How to Stop Worrying and Start Living. In 1953 he wrote The Warrior Saint, a biography on Charles de Foucauld. John Cogley from The New York Times said Bodley had "written a clean, poetic and frankly admiring account" of Foucauld's life. In 1955 he wrote the partly-autobiographical self-help book In Search of Serenity. Elsie Robinson from The Index-Journal and Phyllis Battle from the Tipton Tribune gave favourable reviews, with Robinson calling it "a must for every rasped spirit". His next and final book, The Soundless Sahara, was published in 1968; according to the book's back cover he spent part of his years living in Massachusetts, and the rest in either England or France. He provided information for the book The Secret Lives of Lawrence of Arabia, by Phillip Knightley and Colin Simpson, which was published by Thomas Nelson in 1969. He died on 26 May 1970 in a nursing home in Bramley, Surrey.

== Personal life ==
Bodley married Ruth Mary Elizabeth Stapleton-Bretherton on 30 April 1917 while on extended leave. They had one son, Mark Courtenay Bodley, born 22 May 1918. His wife filed for divorce because Bodley was adulterous and drank excessively. He did not contest the petition and the divorce was finalised on 8 June 1926. In his 1931 memoir Indiscretions of a Young Man, Bodley said the marriage was an "unfortunate action" which "proved the folly of very young people ignoring the advice of their parents." In 1927 he married Australian Beatrice Claire Lamb, whom he met while travelling in North Africa. She filed for divorce around 1939. Bodley's son, who became a lieutenant in the Royal Armoured Corps, was killed in action in Libya in 1942; Wind in the Sahara is dedicated to him. In November 1949 Bodley married American divorcee Harriet Moseley; according to The Soundless Sahara, published in 1968, they were still married. According to William Snell, there is very little information on his last years, but he believed that Bodley's marriage to Moseley ended in divorce no later than 1969.

== Awards ==
Bodley was awarded the Military Cross in the 1916 Birthday Honours. He was awarded the Croix de Chevalier of the Legion d'Honneur by the President of France in 1919, and appointed Officer of the Ordre de l'Étoile Noire in 1920, Knight Officer of The Order of the Crown by Ferdinand of Romania in 1920, and the Order of Wen-Hu (4th Class) by the Republic of China in 1921.

== Publications ==
Bodley published 18 books during his career:

- Algeria from Within (1927)
- Yasmina: A Story of Algeria (1927)
- Opal Fire (1928)
- Indiscretions of a Young Man (1931)
- The Lilac Troll (1932)
- A Japanese Omelette (1933)
- Indiscreet travels East (Java, China and Japan) (1934)
- The Drama of the Pacific (1934)
- Admiral Togo (1935)
- Gertrude Bell (1940) with Lorna Hearst
- Flight into Portugal (1941)
- Wind in the Sahara (1944)
- The Gay Deserters (1945)
- The Messenger (1946)
- The Quest (1947)
- The Warrior Saint (1953)
- In Search of Serenity (1955)
- The Soundless Sahara (1968)
