= The Gathering Storm (2002 film) =

Biopic about Winston Churchill

- Genre: Drama
- Teleplay by: Hugh Whitemore
- Story by: Larry Ramin; Hugh Whitemore
- Directed by: Richard Loncraine
- Starring: Albert Finney; Vanessa Redgrave
- Music by: Howard Goodall
- Countries of origin: United Kingdom; United States
- Original language: English

Production
- Executive producers: Ridley Scott; Tony Scott; Julie Payne; Tracey Scoffield
- Producers: Frank Doelger; David M. Thompson
- Cinematography: Peter Hannan
- Editor: Jim Clark
- Running time: 96 minutes
- Production companies: HBO Films; BBC Films; Scott Free Productions

Original release
- Network: HBO
- Release: 27 April 2002
- Network: BBC
- Release: 12 July 2002

Related
- Into the Storm

The Gathering Storm is a BBC–HBO co-produced television biographical film about Winston Churchill in the years just prior to World War II. The title of the film is that of the first volume of Churchill's largely autobiographical six-volume history of the war, which covered the period from 1919 to 3 September 1939, the day he became First Lord of the Admiralty.

The film, directed by Richard Loncraine and written by Larry Ramin and Hugh Whitemore, stars Albert Finney as Churchill and Vanessa Redgrave as his wife Clementine Churchill ("Clemmie"). The film also features a supporting cast of British actors such as Derek Jacobi, Ronnie Barker (his first role since retiring in 1988), Jim Broadbent, Tom Wilkinson, Celia Imrie, Linus Roache and Hugh Bonneville, and is notable for an early appearance by a young Tom Hiddleston. Lena Headey, Simon Williams, and Edward Hardwicke all make brief appearances amongst the supporting cast. Among the film's executive producers were Ridley Scott and Tony Scott. Originally the film was named The Lonely War.

Finney gained many accolades for his performance, winning both a BAFTA Award for Best Actor and an Emmy for Outstanding Lead Actor. Ramin and Whitemore won the Emmy for Outstanding Writing. It won a Peabody Award in 2002 for being "a portrait of a 20th Century hero’s return from political obscurity to direct the destiny of a nation." In 2016, Mark Lawson of The Guardian ranked it as the most memorable television portrayal of Churchill. A 2009 sequel, Into the Storm, with Churchill portrayed by Brendan Gleeson, focuses on the prime minister's days in office during World War II.

== Plot ==
In 1934, Winston Churchill is deep in his wilderness years, and struggling to complete his biography of his ancestor the Duke of Marlborough, which he hopes will revive his fortunes. Winston is chided by his wife Clemmie for their lack of money and is aware that as a 'man of destiny' his moment may have passed. At the same time he struggles in the House of Commons as a backbencher to get a hearing for his concerns about German re-armament under Hitler and the policy of appeasement. Churchill is also disappointed by the behaviour of his son Randolph Churchill (Tom Hiddleston), which leads to further arguments with Clemmie, who announces she is leaving to go on an extended overseas trip. Churchill is devastated and throws himself into his pet activities: painting, and building walls around the family country house Chartwell. Clemmie eventually returns, and the couple are reconciled.

A young official in the government, Ralph Wigram (Linus Roache) has become concerned about the growth of the German Luftwaffe (air force), and is convinced by his wife to leak information about it to Churchill. Shortly afterwards, Churchill uses Wigram's information to launch an attack on the appeasement policies of Prime Minister Stanley Baldwin (Derek Jacobi). In 1936, Wigram is found dead. Even though his death is thought to be suspicious, his death certificate records the cause as a pulmonary haemorrhage.

With Churchill's fortunes restored, by September 1939, with the declaration of war against Germany at the start of World War II, it is announced that Churchill will be taking over command of the Royal Navy again as First Lord of the Admiralty. An impatient Churchill bids farewell to the staff at the country house, and travels to London. Arriving in the middle of the night at the Admiralty, Churchill is met by a Royal Marine corporal who informs him the fleet have already been signalled that "Winston is Back", to which Churchill triumphantly replies, "And so he bloody well is!"

== Cast ==
- Albert Finney as Winston Churchill
- Vanessa Redgrave as Clementine "Clemmie" Churchill
- Jim Broadbent as Desmond Morton
- Linus Roache as Ralph Wigram
- Lena Headey as Ava Wigram
- Derek Jacobi as Stanley Baldwin
- Ronnie Barker as David Inches
- Tom Wilkinson as Sir Robert Vansittart
- Celia Imrie as Violet Pearman, his chief secretary
- Hugh Bonneville as Ivo Pettifer
- Gottfried John as Friedrich von Schroder
- Anthony Brophy as Brendan Bracken
- Edward Hardwicke as Mr. Wood, bank manager
- Tom Hiddleston as Randolph Churchill
- Tim Bentinck as John Churchill, 1st Duke of Marlborough, Churchill's ancestor
- Dolly Wells as Sarah Churchill
- Emma Seigel as Mary Churchill
- Nancy Carroll as Diana Churchill
- John Standing as Lord Moyne
- Gerrard McArthur as Vic Oliver

== Locations ==
Churchill's real-life family home Chartwell was used for the scenes at his house and grounds. Indoor scenes were not filmed inside the house itself, but in replicas of its rooms built on Chartwell's lawn.

== Reception ==
In 2016, Mark Lawson of The Guardian chose The Gathering Storm as the most memorable television portrayal of Churchill. He wrote: "This BBC-HBO account of Churchill's return from exile to save his nation will always be the one to beat. Finney doesn’t take many roles, and his meticulous preparation is apparent: he uncannily walks and talks almost exactly as Churchill did, while also vividly suggesting – especially in a scene where the leader, nude in his bathroom, dictates a speech to a secretary – the character’s battles between body and mind."

The review aggregation website Rotten Tomatoes gave the film an 83% approval rating based on 6 reviews, with an average rating of 6.60/10.

== Awards and nominations ==
Year	Award	Category	Nominee(s)	Result	Ref.
2002	Online Film & Television Association Awards	Best Motion Picture Made for Television		Won	
2002	Online Film & Television Association Awards	Best Actor in a Motion Picture or Miniseries	Albert Finney	Won	
2002	Online Film & Television Association Awards	Best Actress in a Motion Picture or Miniseries	Vanessa Redgrave	Won	
2002	Online Film & Television Association Awards	Best Supporting Actor in a Motion Picture or Miniseries	Jim Broadbent	Won	
2002	Online Film & Television Association Awards	Best Supporting Actor in a Motion Picture or Miniseries	Tom Wilkinson	Nominated	
2002	Online Film & Television Association Awards	Best Direction of a Motion Picture or Miniseries		Nominated	
2002	Online Film & Television Association Awards	Best Writing of a Motion Picture or Miniseries		Won	
2002	Online Film & Television Association Awards	Best Ensemble in a Motion Picture or Miniseries		Nominated	
2002	Online Film & Television Association Awards	Best Costume Design in a Motion Picture or Miniseries		Nominated	
2002	Online Film & Television Association Awards	Best Lighting in a Motion Picture or Miniseries		Nominated	
2002	Online Film & Television Association Awards	Best Music in a Motion Picture or Miniseries		Nominated	
2002	Online Film & Television Association Awards	Best New Theme Song in a Motion Picture or Miniseries		Nominated	
2002	Online Film & Television Association Awards	Best New Titles Sequence in a Motion Picture or Miniseries		Nominated	
2002	Online Film & Television Association Awards	Best Sound in a Motion Picture or Miniseries		Nominated	
2002	Primetime Emmy Awards	Outstanding Made for Television Movie	Ridley Scott, Tony Scott, Julie Payne, Tracey Scoffield, Lisa Ellzey, Frank Doelger, and David M. Thompson	Won	
2002	Primetime Emmy Awards	Outstanding Lead Actor in a Miniseries or a Movie	Albert Finney	Won	
2002	Primetime Emmy Awards	Outstanding Lead Actress in a Miniseries or a Movie	Vanessa Redgrave	Nominated	
2002	Primetime Emmy Awards	Outstanding Supporting Actor in a Miniseries or a Movie	Jim Broadbent	Nominated	
2002	Primetime Emmy Awards	Outstanding Directing for a Miniseries, Movie or a Dramatic Special	Richard Loncraine	Nominated	
2002	Primetime Emmy Awards	Outstanding Writing for a Miniseries, Movie or a Dramatic Special	Larry Ramin and Hugh Whitemore	Won	
2002	Primetime Emmy Awards	Outstanding Casting for a Miniseries, Movie or a Special	Irene Lamb	Nominated	
2002	Primetime Emmy Awards	Outstanding Costumes for a Miniseries, Movie or a Special	Jenny Beavan, Anna Kot, and Clare Spragge	Nominated	
2002	Primetime Emmy Awards	Outstanding Single-Camera Sound Mixing for a Miniseries or a Movie	David Stephenson, Rick Ash, John Hayward, and Richard Pryke	Nominated	
2003	AARP Movies for Grownups Awards	Best Grownup Love Story	Albert Finney and Vanessa Redgrave	Won	
2003	American Film Institute Awards	Top 10 Television Programs		Won	
2003	British Academy Television Awards	Best Actor	Albert Finney	Won	
2003	British Academy Television Awards	Best Actress	Vanessa Redgrave	Nominated	
2003	British Academy Television Craft Awards	Best Costume Design	Jenny Beavan	Nominated	
2003	British Academy Television Craft Awards	Best Make-Up and Hair Design	Daniel Parker, Frances Hannon, and Stephen Rose	Won	
2003	British Academy Television Craft Awards	Best Original Television Music	Howard Goodall	Nominated	
2003	British Academy Television Craft Awards	Best Production Design	Luciana Arrighi	Won	
2003	Broadcasting Press Guild Awards	Best Single Drama		Won	
2003	Broadcasting Press Guild Awards	Best Actor	Albert Finney	Won	
2003	Broadcasting Press Guild Awards	Best Actress	Vanessa Redgrave	Won	
2003	Cinema Audio Society Awards	Outstanding Achievement in Sound Mixing for Television – Movies of the Week and Mini-Series	David Stephenson, Rick Ash, John Hayward, and Richard Pryke	Nominated	
2003	Directors Guild of America Awards	Outstanding Directorial Achievement in Movies for Television or Miniseries	Richard Loncraine	Nominated	
2003	Golden Globe Awards	Best Miniseries or Television Film		Won	
2003	Golden Globe Awards	Best Actor – Miniseries or Television Film	Albert Finney	Won	
2003	Golden Globe Awards	Best Actress – Miniseries or Television Film	Vanessa Redgrave	Nominated	
2003	Golden Globe Awards	Best Supporting Actor – Series, Miniseries or Television Film	Jim Broadbent	Nominated	
2003	Peabody Awards		Scott Free Productions, in association with HBO Films and BBC Films	Won	
2003	Producers Guild of America Awards	David L. Wolper Award for Outstanding Producer of Long-Form Television	Ridley Scott, Tony Scott, Julie Payne, and Frank Doelger	Nominated	
2003	Royal Television Society Awards	Actor (Male)	Albert Finney	Nominated	
2003	Satellite Awards	Best Motion Picture Made for Television		Nominated	
2003	Satellite Awards	Best Actor in a Miniseries or Motion Picture Made for Television	Albert Finney	Nominated	
2003	Satellite Awards	Best Actress in a Miniseries or Motion Picture Made for Television	Vanessa Redgrave	Nominated	
2003	Satellite Awards	Best Actor in a Supporting Role in a Series, Miniseries or Motion Picture Made for Television	Jim Broadbent	Nominated	
2003	Satellite Awards	Best Actor in a Supporting Role in a Series, Miniseries or Motion Picture Made for Television	Linus Roache	Won	
2003	Screen Actors Guild Awards	Outstanding Performance by a Male Actor in a Miniseries or Television Movie	Albert Finney	Nominated	
2003	Screen Actors Guild Awards	Outstanding Performance by a Female Actor in a Miniseries or Television Movie	Vanessa Redgrave	Nominated	
2003	Writers Guild of America Awards	Long Form – Original	Larry Ramin and Hugh Whitemore	Won	

== See also ==
- Into the Storm – 2009 sequel starring Brendan Gleeson
- The Gathering Storm – 1974 similar film starring Richard Burton
- Darkest Hour – 2017 film starring Gary Oldman
