= Bodley Survey =

17th century tax map

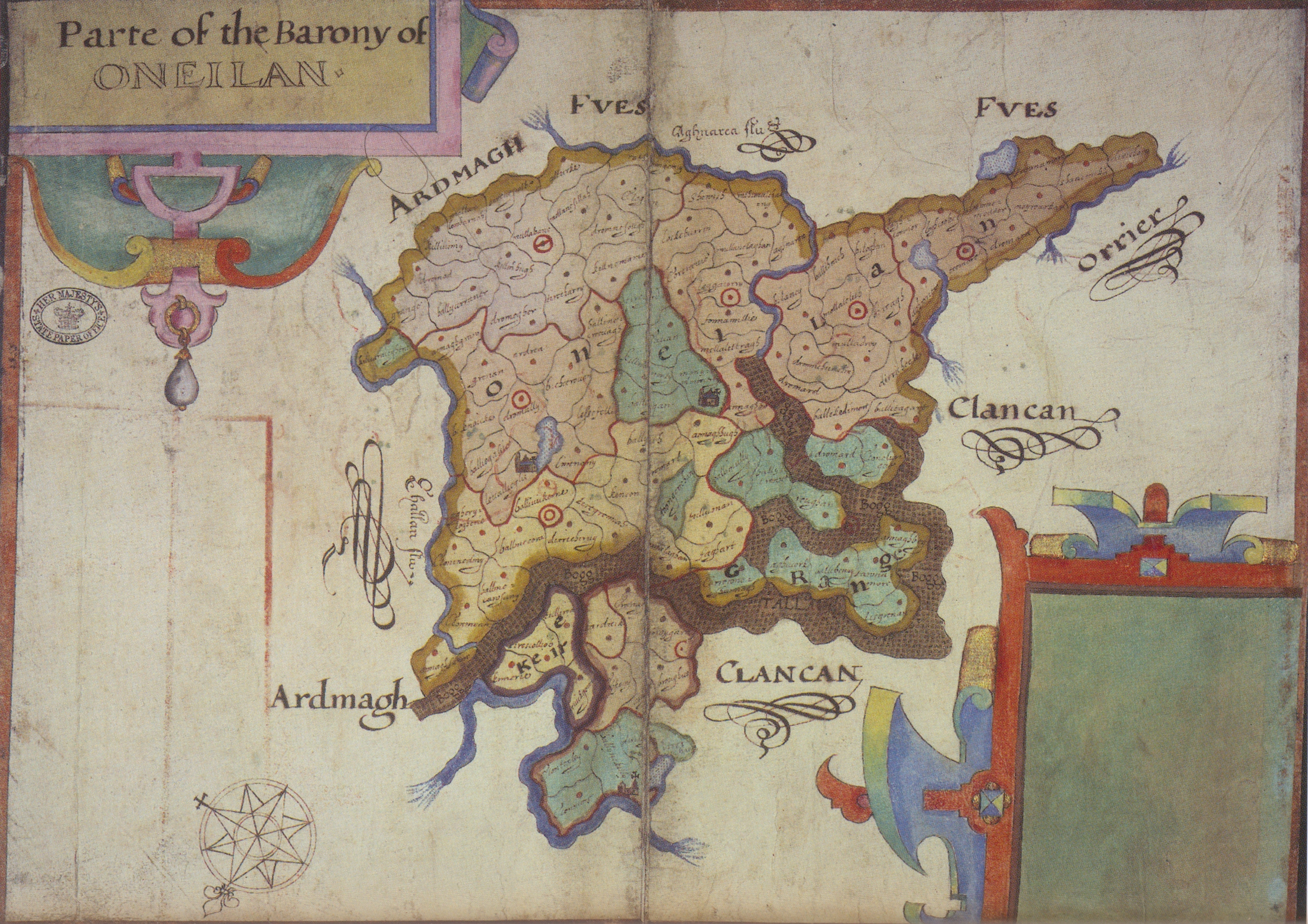
One of the maps drawn up during the Survey.

The Bodley Survey was a 1609 cadastral survey overseen by Josias Bodley which aimed to study the largely unmapped areas of Ulster in the Kingdom of Ireland. It is also referred to as the Ulster Survey of 1609.

The survey covered six counties Armagh, Cavan, Coleraine, Donegal, Fermanagh, and Tyrone. Following the Flight of the Earls, this was land which had been set aside for the Ulster Plantation to be granted to a mixture of English and Scottish settlers and Irish inhabitants. Bodley was a veteran of the Nine Years' War who now held the position of Inspector of Fortifications in Ireland. He had previously overseen a preliminary report of the Ulster terrain, but this was insufficient for the more formal requirements of the Plantation. The eight-man team led by Bodley included the cartographer Thomas Raven.

One of the problems the surveyors encountered was that Gaelic Ireland had used differing and sometimes irregular units of measurement. Areas were often defined by natural features such as hills or rivers or man-made constructions such as tower houses or burial mounds. Because of time constraints, the surveyors mostly had to calculate the landscape on the basis local knowledge. Only occasionally were they able to actually measure in person. The study generally received co-operation from the Gaelic inhabitants.

The survey was able to demarcate townlands and baronies which became the basis for later ownership. Some of the errors in the study led to land ownership disputes, and Bodley himself carried out later surveys to clarify the confusion. The survey was part of an increasing effort to use scientific methods to measure terrain in the seventeenth century. A much more comprehensive study of Ireland was undertaken in the 1650s known as the Down Survey.

== Bibliography ==
- Bardon, Jonathan. The Plantation of Ulster. Gill & MacMillan, 2012.
