= Josias Bodley =

English military engineer

- Born: 1550; Exeter, Devon, England
- Died: 1618 (aged 67–68); Ireland
- Occupations: Engineer, soldier

Sir Josias Bodley (1550-1618) was an English military engineer noted for his service in Ireland during the Nine Years' War. Following the end of the war he remained in Ireland where he oversaw the rebuilding of several major forts. In 1609 he was entrusted with the Bodley Survey which mapped out terrain for the Ulster Plantation.

== Early life ==
He was the son of John Bodley a merchant from Exeter, and the younger brother of the scholar Sir Thomas Bodley, known for his involvement in the Bodleian Library. Josias spent some of his youth abroad, where his Protestant father had gone as a Marian exile during reign of the Catholic Mary I. He attended Merton College, Oxford before travelling around Europe. He then joined the English forces fighting for the Dutch Republic against Spain in the Low Countries. By 1598, he had reached the rank of captain.

== Ireland ==
Bodley served during the Nine Years' War in Ireland, where Crown forces were battling against the rebellion of Hugh O'Neill, Earl of Tyrone. At the decisive Battle of Kinsale Bodley was appointed as "Trenchmaster" (chief engineer) of the Anglo-Irish troops under Lord Mountjoy besieging a Spanish expeditionary force. He later served in Ulster, taking part in the storming of one of Tyrone's great fortresses at Lough Lurcan (modern-day Moyrourkan Lough). He commanded the post of Armagh with 700 troops as a garrison. When the Treaty of Mellifont brought the war to an end he was given a command in the peacetime Irish Army like several other veterans. He was knighted in March 1604 and was subsequently appointed Inspector of Fortifications in Ireland. He was also made Governor of Duncannon Fort.

== Bodley Survey ==
Following the Flight of the Earls in 1607 and the subsequent O'Doherty's Rebellion, the lands of several rebel Gaelic lords were confiscated and plans were drawn up for the settling of British immigrants alongside those loyal Gaelic leaders who were to be granted land. Bodley carried out a preliminary study of the terrain as a guide for London when the Ulster Plantation was being drawn up by James I and his government. In 1609 he headed a more detailed survey which systematically catalogued the Ulster landscape for the first time. This became the basis for grants made under the Plantation. The King was impressed by the work and later commissioned Bodley to perform further studies of Ulster.

He died in 1618, and was buried in Ireland. He was succeeded in his post as Inspector of Fortifications by two replacements. He was later included in John Prince's book The Worthies of Devon.

== Bibliography ==
- Bardon, Jonathan. The Plantation of Ulster. Gill & MacMillan, 2012.
- McGurk, John. Sir Henry Docwra, 1564-1631: Derry's Second FounderFour Courts Press, 2006.
