= The Dark Room (Walters novel) =

1995 crime novel by Minette Walters

- First edition (UK)
- Author: Minette Walters
- Language: English
- Genre: Crime / Mystery novel
- Publisher: Macmillan Publishers (UK); St Martins Press (US); Allen & Unwin (Aus)
- Publication date: 13 October 1995
- Publication place: United Kingdom
- Media type: Print (Hardcover, Paperback) & Audio CD
- Pages: 416pp (hardback)
- ISBN: 0-333-64789-0
- OCLC: 60236341

The Dark Room is a 1995 crime novel by English writer Minette Walters. It was shortlisted for a CWA Gold Dagger.

In 1999, The Dark Room was adapted for television by the BBC. The cast featured Dervla Kirwan as Jane 'Jinx' Kingsley and James Wilby as Dr. Protheroe.
