= Bodley Scott =

Bodley Scott may refer to brothers:

- Mark Bodley Scott (1923–2013), English rower who competed in the 1948 Summer Olympics
- Ronald Bodley Scott (1906–1982), English haematologist and Royal physician
