= Ralph Wigram =

British Foreign Office senior official, pre-WWII (1890-1936)

Ralph Follett Wigram CMG (/reɪf ˈwɪɡrəm/ rayf WIG-rəm; 23 October 1890 – 31 December 1936) was a British government official in the Foreign Office. He helped raise the alarm about German rearmament under Hitler during the period prior to World War II.

In part, he did this by providing intelligence information about German rearmament to Winston Churchill, at a time when Churchill did not hold a position in the government of Stanley Baldwin. Churchill used the information to publicly attack the policies of Baldwin. Churchill's six-volume history of World War II, The Second World War, described Wigram as a "great unsung hero". The autobiography of Valentine Lawford, who worked under Wigram in the Central Department, describes him variously as "the authentic local deity" and "the departmental volcano".

Wigram's role was brought to public attention by the Southern Television drama serial Winston Churchill: The Wilderness Years (in which he was portrayed by Paul Freeman), and later by the biographical movie about Churchill, The Gathering Storm (in which he was portrayed by Linus Roache).

Winston Churchill wrote:

I had also formed a friendship with Ralph Wigram, then the rising star of the Foreign Office and in the centre of all its affairs. He had reached a level in that department which entitled him to express responsible opinions upon policy, and to use a wide discretion in his contacts, official and unofficial. He was a charming and fearless man, and his convictions, based upon profound knowledge and study, dominated his being.

He saw as clearly as I did, but with more certain information, the awful peril which was closing in upon us. This drew us together. Often we met at his little house on North Street, and he and Mrs. Wigram came to stay with us at Chartwell. Like other officials of high rank, he spoke to me with complete confidence. All this helped me to form and fortify my opinion about the Hitler movement. For my part, with the many connections I now had in France, in Germany, and other countries, I had been able to send him a certain amount of information which we examined together.

From 1933 onwards, Wigram became keenly distressed at the policy of the government and the course of events. While his official chiefs formed every day a higher opinion of his capacity, and while his influence in the Foreign Office grew, his thoughts turned repeatedly to resignation. He had so much force and grace in his conversation that all who had grave business with him, and many others, gave ever-increasing importance to his views.

== Early life and education ==
Wigram was the son of Eustace Rochester Wigram and Mary Grace Bradford-Atkinson, and had a younger sister, Isabel. He was the grandson of the Right Reverend Joseph Cotton Wigram, Bishop of Rochester, younger son of Sir Robert Wigram, 1st Baronet. He was a second cousin of Lord Wigram. He was educated at Eton and University College, Oxford.

== Career ==
Wigram joined the Foreign Office after graduation. He served as temporary secretary at the British Embassy in Washington, DC, from 1916 to 1919, as third secretary at the Foreign Office from 1919 to 1920, as second secretary at the Foreign Office from 1920 to 1921, as first secretary at the British Embassy in Paris from 1924 to 1933, and as counsellor at the Foreign Office and head of the Central Department from 1934 to 1936. He was appointed a Companion of the Order of St Michael and St George (CMG) in 1933.

== German rearmament and Churchill ==
Wigram's superior in the Foreign Office, Permanent Under-Secretary Sir Robert Vansittart had been quite alarmed about the German situation for several years, and when Wigram came on board, they soon came to share deep concern about the situation. Churchill's biographer William Manchester described one of Wigram's memoranda from this period as having "a sagacity and vision seldom matched in Britain's archives". In the beginning, they tried to raise the alarm with their political masters in the government, to no avail; in desperation, they then turned to other means.

Wigram did make at least one attempt at direct publicity – at the time of the occupation of the Rhineland in early 1936, he arranged a press conference for French Minister of Foreign Affairs Flandin, but it had little effect.

His efforts in another direction were far more successful. Wigram had begun passing information to Churchill in late 1934, apparently with the knowledge and support of Vansittart. The original path was via Major Desmond Morton, but from early 1935, Wigram began to interact directly with Churchill. From then on, Wigram and Churchill were in close contact. Starting on 7 April 1935, the Wigrams often spent weekends with Churchill at Chartwell, his country house, and Churchill also visited Wigram's London home. The information seems to have been primarily about the German air force, although more general material about German rearmament, and Hitler's character and likely aims, was included, as well.

Wigram was one of many people passing information to Churchill; Churchill's biographer, Martin Gilbert, estimated that more than 20 (although he credited Wigram as one of the three main players) were involved. The film Gathering Storm, however, focuses on Wigram; the film's director, Richard Loncraine, said, "in reality there were four 'Wigrams' – two Army officers and two civil servants. It would be cinematographically inept to have four people doing the same thing. What we did was leave out the other three characters".

Members of Parliament enjoy parliamentary privilege, including the right to say what they will and discuss what they will during proceedings in Parliament. Well aware of this, Churchill was able to criticise the UK government in the House of Commons without fear of comeback. The position of those who supplied him with data on Britain's defences, or the lack of them, can be explained by the fact that, as a privy councillor and former chancellor of the exchequer, Churchill had the highest level of security clearance and could, therefore, be assumed not to misuse the information passed to him. Baldwin's government certainly did not like the passing of information to Churchill; Walter Runciman, the president of the Board of Trade, was sent to see Wigram's wife Ava when Wigram was not at home to try to convince her to stop her husband from passing information to Churchill.

Wigram and Churchill did disagree over the Anglo-German Naval Agreement. Wigram supported it as a means to escape the strictures of disarmament, whereas Churchill felt it condoned German treaty-breaking. Nevertheless, Wigram remained a firm opponent of the policy of appeasement.

== Personal life ==
Wigram married Ava Bodley, daughter of the historian J. E. C. Bodley, on 28 February 1925; they had one child, Charles Edward Thomas Bodley Wigram (1929–1951) (who apparently suffered from some sort of birth defect, but sources disagree whether it was Down syndrome, cerebral palsy, or autism). Ava's letters to Churchill indicate that she supported Wigram's attempts to warn Churchill.

According to Churchill, the British government's failure in March 1936 to pledge any support to France in countering Germany's remilitarization of the Rhineland dealt a mortal blow to Wigram. He went home and told his wife: "War is now inevitable, and it will be the most terrible war there has ever been. I don't think I shall see it, but you will. Wait now for bombs on this little house... All my work these many years has been no use. I am a failure. I have failed to make the people here realise what is at stake".

Wigram's sudden death at the age of 46 is somewhat mysterious. Again, sources disagree on several points. For one, some say he was found dead at home, but a letter from Churchill says he died in Ava's arms. His death certificate recorded the cause of death as pulmonary haemorrhage, but a letter from Henry Pelling indicates he committed suicide while deeply depressed. The fact that his own parents did not attend his funeral in Sussex is cited as support for this theory, although Churchill and his family did attend, along with Robert Vansittart and Brendan Bracken, and his parents were attending a memorial service for him that morning in Devon, where Wigram was brought up and which was closer to many of his family's friends. Churchill's letters indicate (but only indirectly) that depression and suicide were the cause. Polio has also been put forward as a cause by some sources. He was buried in the churchyard at Cuckfield, Sussex. After Wigram's death, Ava stayed in close contact with Churchill, writing to him about her travels to Germany before the outbreak of war. She later married Sir John Anderson in 1941.
