= Desmond Morton (civil servant) =

British military officer and government official

Sir Desmond John Falkiner Morton KCB CMG MC
- Born: 13 November 1891
- Died: 31 July 1971 (aged 79)
- Military career
- Branch: Royal Artillery; MI6
- Rank: Major
- Conflicts: World War II
- Awards: Military Cross; Knighthood

Major Sir Desmond Morton KCB CMG MC (13 November 1891 – 31 July 1971) was a British military officer and government official. Morton played an important role in organizing opposition to appeasement of Germany under Adolf Hitler during the period prior to World War II by providing intelligence information about German re-armament to Winston Churchill. At this time Churchill did not have any position in the government. In 1940, Morton was Churchill's personal assistant when he became prime minister.

== Early years in military service ==
Morton joined the Royal Artillery in 1911. He saw action in World War I, and was shot in the lung at the Battle of Arras in 1917. However, he survived and recovered, serving again with the bullet still inside. He served as aide de camp to Sir Douglas Haig, commander of the British Expeditionary Force from 1917 to 1918. He looked after the Minister of Munitions on several trips to the front during the war.

== Civil Service ==
He was seconded to the Foreign Office in 1919 where he was head of the Secret Intelligence Service's Section V, dealing with counter-Bolshevism in the mid-1920s. In 1924 he was transferred by Churchill to the War Office and was Head of the Industrial Intelligence Centre of the Committee of Imperial Defence from 1929 to 1939, responsible for providing intelligence on the plans and capabilities for manufacturing munitions in other countries. From 1930 to 1939 he was also a member of the CID sub-committee on Economic Warfare. From 1929, as he "found himself idle much of the time" he assisted Churchill who was writing his history of the Great War, The World Crisis. During 1930s he leaked documents and material information to bolster Churchill's fight against the rise of fascism in Europe. Morton claimed that he had tacit approval by successive Prime Ministers, MacDonald, Baldwin and Chamberlain for this secret activity, but the evidence for this is unfounded because witness statements have not come forward. Morton lived only one mile away from Chartwell where he would walk across the fields to divulge his information to Churchill.

== World War Two and post war ==
In 1939, he became the Principal Assistant Secretary at the Ministry of Economic Warfare, and became Churchill's Personal Assistant at no.10 Downing Street in 1940. Morton used to handle Ultra codes from Bletchley Park, as important messages were sent directly to the Prime Minister's Office. Later in the war these informal arrangements fell away to be replaced by a more structured bureaucracy, and with it Morton's influence declined. He served on the UN's Economic Survey Mission for the Middle East in 1949, and served in the Ministry of Civil Aviation from 1950 to 1953.

== Honours and film portrayal ==
He was awarded the Military Cross in 1917, and a knighthood in 1945.

Morton was portrayed by Moray Watson in the 1981 mini-series Winston Churchill: The Wilderness Years, and by Jim Broadbent in the 2002 film The Gathering Storm.

== See also ==
- Zinoviev letter
- Ralph Wigram

== Sources ==
- Jenkins, Roy (2001). Churchill. pp. 479-80.
- Manchester, William (1988). The Last Lion. Winston Spencer Churchill: Alone 1932-1940. Little, Brown and Company. ISBN 0-316-54512-0.
