= Thomas Bodley =

English diplomat and scholar

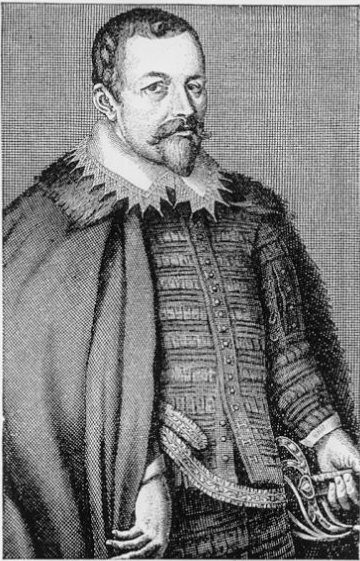
Sir Thomas Bodley

Sir Thomas Bodley (2 March 1545 – 28 January 1613) was an English diplomat and scholar who founded the Bodleian Library in Oxford.

== Origins ==
Thomas Bodley was born on 2 March 1545, in the second-to-last year of the reign of King Henry VIII, in the city of Exeter in Devon. He was one of the seven sons of John Bodley (d. 15 Oct. 1591) of Exeter, a Protestant merchant who chose foreign exile rather than staying in England under the Roman Catholic government of Queen Mary (r. 1553–1558). He was thereby involved in the publication of Sir Rowland Hill's Geneva Bible.

John's father, also John Bodley, was a younger son of the gentry family of Bodley of Dunscombe, near Crediton in Devon. Thomas's mother was Joan Hone, a daughter and co-heiress of Robert Hone of Ottery St Mary, Devon. Thomas's younger brother was Sir Josias Bodley, knighted in Ireland by the Earl of Devon.

== Childhood and education ==
The family, including Thomas' younger brother Josias Bodley (and the ten-year-old Nicholas Hilliard, who had been attached to the household by his parents, friends of Bodley), sought refuge in the Duchy of Cleves during the reign of Queen Mary (1553 1558). They stayed in the town of Wesel, then in the imperial free city of Frankfurt, before eventually settling in Geneva, home of Calvinism and a great centre of the Reformation. There, Thomas had the opportunity to study at John Calvin's newly erected Academy. He attended lectures in Divinity given by Theodore Beza and Calvin himself and attended services led by John Knox. He learned Greek from Mattheus Beroaldus and Hebrew from Antoine Chevallier. The study of these languages remained enduring passions for Bodley throughout his life.

After Mary's death in 1558 and the accession of Queen Elizabeth, the family returned to England, and Bodley entered Magdalen College, Oxford, to study under Lawrence Humphrey. In 1563 he took his B.A. degree, and was shortly thereafter, in 1564, admitted as a Fellow of Merton College.

Thomas Bodley was married to Ann Ball, a wealthy widow, and he left no children.

== Career ==
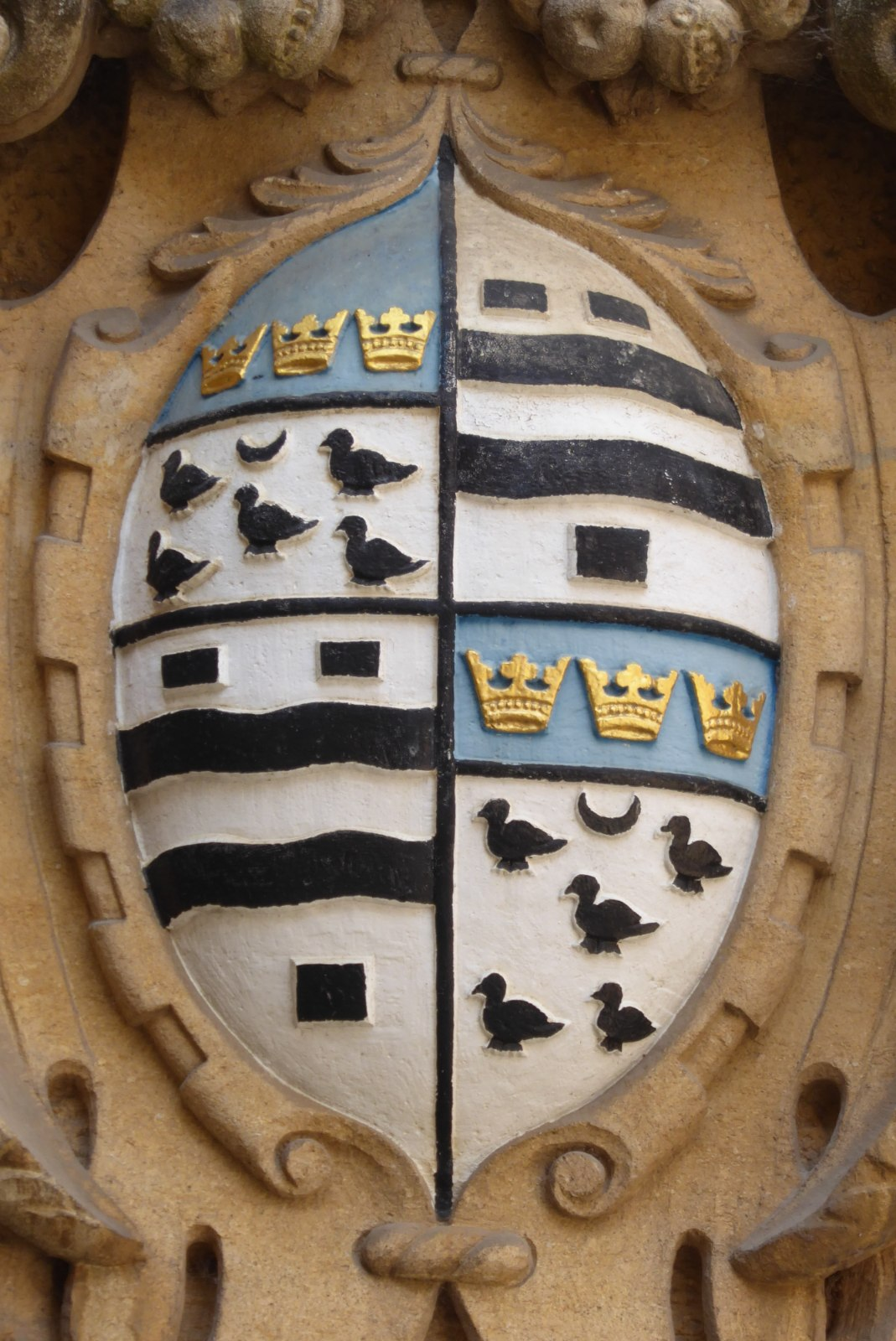
Arms of Sir Thomas above the entrance to the Bodleian

He began lecturing at Merton and in April 1565 was formally appointed as the college's first Lecturer in Ancient Greek, a post that was subsequently made permanent. He served in many college offices: in 1569 he was elected as one of the University's junior proctors and for some time after was deputy Public Orator. Leaving Oxford in 1576 with a license to study abroad and a grant from his college of ten marks (£6. 13s. 4d.), Bodley toured France, Italy, and the Holy Roman Empire, visiting scholars and adding French, Italian, and Spanish to his repertoire of languages.

It has been suggested that during his tour in Italy he was initiated in Forlì in some form of Pythagorean initiation in a platonic academy.

On his return to England Bodley was appointed a gentleman-usher to Queen Elizabeth, and in 1584 he entered the House of Commons as one of the members for Portsmouth. In 1585 he was entrusted with a mission to form a league between Frederick II of Denmark and certain German princes to assist Henry of Navarre, the future Henry IV of France. He was next dispatched on a secret mission to France. In 1586 he was elected to represent St Germans in parliament, and in 1588 he was sent to The Hague as minister, a post which demanded great diplomatic skill, for it was in the Netherlands that the power of Spain had to be fought. The essential difficulties of his mission were complicated by the intrigues of the queen's ministers at home, and Bodley repeatedly asked to be recalled. He was finally permitted to return to England in 1596, but finding his hoped-for promotion to Secretary of State obstructed by the competing interests of Burghley and Essex, he retired from public life and returned to Oxford.

When he married in 1587, he was obliged to resign his fellowship at Merton, but he retained many friends there and in the spring of 1598 the college gave a dinner in his honour. G. H. Martin speculates that the inspiration to restore the old Duke Humfrey's Library may have come from the renewal of Bodley's contact with Henry Savile and other former colleagues at this dinner. Once his proposal was accepted, he devoted the rest of his life to the library project. The former library had suffered from the overzealous commissioners of Edward VI who weeded the ancient collection. The subject was knighted on 18 April 1604.

== Marriage ==
In 1587 he married Ann Carew, the wealthy widow of Mr Ball, and the daughter of Mr Carew of Bristol in Somerset. His monument in Merton College Chapel displays the arms of Bodley impaling Carew (Or, three lions passant in pale sable), an ancient Devonshire family seated at Mohuns Ottery, descended from Nicholas Carew (d. 1311), feudal lord of Carew Castle in Pembrokeshire, feudal lord of Odrone (mod. Idrone, County Carlow) in Ireland and lord of the manor of Moulsford in Berkshire.

== Death and burial ==
He died on 28 January 1613, and was buried in the choir of Merton College Chapel. His monument survives on the western wall of the north transept of the chapel, formed of black and white marble with pillars representing books and allegories of learning.

== The Bodleian Library ==
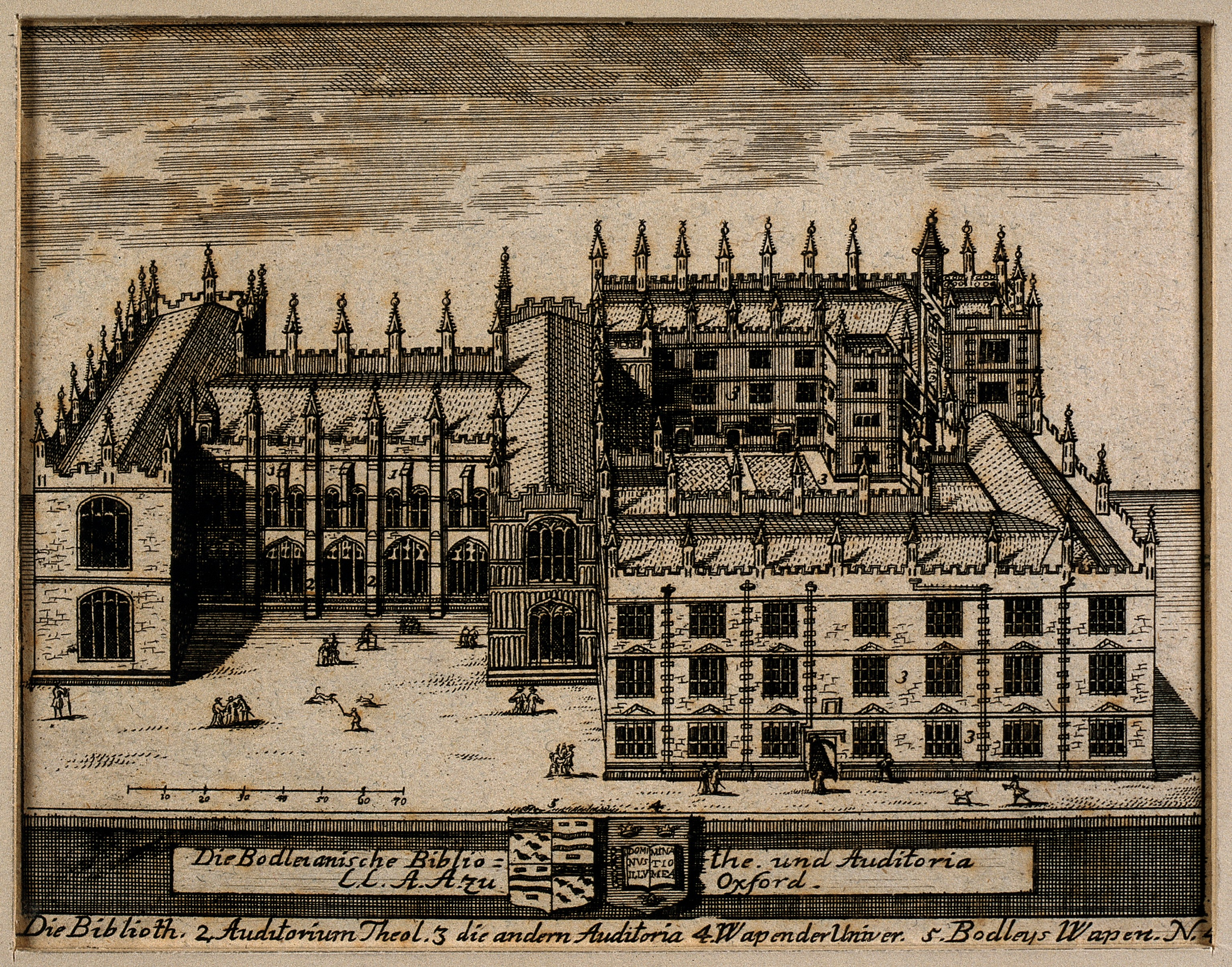
Engraving of the Bodleian showing Sir Thomas's arms alongside the arms of the university

Bodley's greatest achievement was the re-founding of the library at Oxford. In 1444, the existing university library was augmented by a gift of some 300 manuscripts from Humphrey, Duke of Gloucester, the youngest son of Henry IV; this prompted the university to build a new library above the Divinity School which was at that time under construction. However, during the Reformation of the 1550s, the library had been stripped and abandoned, remaining virtually untouched until the return of Bodley in 1598. The library was later named the Bodleian Library in his honour. He determined, he said, "to take his farewell of state employments and to set up his staff at the library door in Oxford." In February of 1598 his offer to restore the old library was accepted by the university. Bodley began his book collection effort in 1600, using the site of the former library above the Divinity School, which was in near ruin.

Although Bodley lived over 400 years ago, modern libraries benefit from some of his ideas and practices.

One important idea that Bodley implemented was the creation of a "Benefactors' Book" in 1602, which was bound and put on display in the library in 1604. While he did have funding through the wealth of his wife, Ann Ball, and the inheritance he received from his father, Bodley still needed gifts from his affluent friends and colleagues to build his library collection. Although not a completely original idea (as encouragement in 1412 the university chaplain was ordered to say mass for benefactors), Bodley recognized that having the contributor's name on permanent display was also inspiring. According to Louis B. Wright,

He had prepared a handsome Register of Donations, in vellum, in which the name of every benefactor should be written down in a large and fair hand so all might read. And he kept the Register prominently displayed so that no visitor to the library could escape seeing the generosity of Bodley's friends. The plan, as it deserved, was a success, for its originator found that, 'every man bethinks himself how by some good book or other he may be written in the scroll of the benefactors.'

For over four centuries, this innovative idea has continued to motivate friends of libraries everywhere.

Some remarkable donations to the Bodleian Library marked in the register of donations were fifty pounds from Sir Walter Raleigh in 1603, on the eve of his second jailing in the Tower of London, and a copy of Francis Bacon's new book The Advancement of Learning, presented by the author himself in 1605.

Another significant event related to Bodley was the agreement between the Bodleian Library and the Stationers' Company, in which "the Company agreed to send to the Library a copy of every book entered in their Register on condition that the books thus given might be borrowed if needed for reprinting, and that the books given to the Library by others might be examined, collated and copied by the Company."

This made the Bodleian the first legal deposit library. Today it is one of six such libraries in the United Kingdom and Ireland. In 2003, the Copyright Act 1911 was expanded to include information on CD-ROM and websites. This regulation is in place to ensure the collection and preservation of all published materials as an accurate, up-to-date historical record.

== Publications ==
Bodley wrote his autobiography up to the year 1609, which, with the first draft of the statutes drawn up for the library, and his letters to the librarian, Thomas James, was published by Thomas Hearne, under the title of Reliquiae Bodleianae, or Authentic Remains of Sir Thomas Bodley, (London, 1703, 8vo).
