= Wigram (surname) =

Wigram is a surname, and may refer to:

- Clive Wigram, 1st Baron Wigram (1873–1960), Private Secretary to the Sovereign
- Edmund Wigram (1911 – 1945) member of two of the early British Everest expeditions
- Edgar T. A. Wigram, that is Edgar Thomas Ainger Wigram (1864-1935), British painter
- George Wigram, that is George Vicesimus Wigram (1805–1879) English biblical scholar and theologian
- Sir Henry Wigram (1857–1934), New Zealand businessman for whom Wigram Aerodrome is named
- General Sir Kenneth Wigram (1875–1949), British Army officer
- Joseph Wigram (1798–1867), British churchman, archdeacon of Surrey, archdeacon of Winchester and bishop of Rochester
- Lionel Wigram (film producer) (born 1962), British film producer and screenplay writer
- Lionel Wigram (British Army officer) (1907–1944), British soldier
- Loftus Wigram (1803–1889), British barrister, businessman and Conservative politician
- Money Wigram ( 1790–1873), English shipbuilder and ship owner
- Neville Wigram, 2nd Baron Wigram (1915–2017), retired Lieutenant Colonel of the British Army
- Octavius Wigram (1794–1878), English business man and ship owner, a member of Lloyds and Governor of the Royal Exchange Assurance Corporation
- Ralph Wigram (1890–1936), British government official
- Sir Robert Wigram, 1st Baronet (1744–1830), British merchant shipbuilder and politician
- William Ainger Wigram (1872–1953), English Church of England priest and author
- Woolmore Wigram (1831–1907), English Church of England priest and campanologist
