= Robert Wigram =

Robert Wigram may refer to:

- Sir Robert Wigram, 1st Baronet (1744–1830), British shipbuilder and politician
- Sir Robert Fitzwygram, 2nd Baronet (1773–1843)
- Sir Robert Fitzwygram, 3rd Baronet (1813–1873), of the Wigram baronets
