= William Ainger Wigram =

English Anglican priest (1872–1953)

Rev. William Ainger Wigram (16 May 1872 – 16 January 1953) was an English Church of England priest and author, notable for his work with and writings on the Assyrian Church of the East.

== Biography ==
William Wigram, a younger son of Woolmore Wigram, was born at Furneaux Pelham, Hertfordshire in the vicarage of his father, also a Church of England priest. He was the grandson of Money Wigram, a director of the Bank of England, and great-grandson of Eleanor, Lady Wigram, a notable nineteenth century philanthropist and Robert Wigram, who was awarded a baronetcy in 1805 – an honour which eventually passed to William's brother Edgar, who became the 6th Baronet Wigram.

William Wigram was educated at King's School, Canterbury and Trinity Hall, Cambridge, graduating in 1893. He became a pupil of Brooke Foss Westcott, Bishop of Durham, was ordained in 1897, and was appointed a curate in the diocese.

In 1902 he joined the Archbishop of Canterbury's Mission to the Assyrian Christians on the invitation of O. H. Parry – later an author of a 1907 History of the Church, written in Assyrian. The mission concentrated on supporting the Patriarch, and the education of Assyrian clerics and laity, including the founding of a college for priests, and 45 schools in Mesopotamia. Wigram served as a teacher at a school in Van, eventually rising to lead the mission for the last five years of his service, ending in 1912. Wigram was awarded a Lambeth degree in 1910 by Archbishop Randall Davidson and in the same year published The Assyrian Church, 100–640 AD. His work with the church is reputed to have, to some extent, healed the divide between the Church of the East and the Anglican communion, in part as a result of his diplomatic exertions, and in part through his argument that the Nestorian tendency of the church was no more than nominal. In 1914, based on his mission-related travels, he published (with his brother Edgar) The Cradle of Mankind; Life in Eastern Kurdistan, an anecdotal progression through the region.

Wigram moved to Constantinople in 1912 to take up a chaplaincy position. During World War I he was interned; Turkey having allied itself with Germany. He was co-opted to advise on the resettlement of Assyrians after the war; following which he was appointed chaplain to the British Legation in Greece from 1922 to 1926, and as a canon in St Paul's Church from 1928 to 1936. He continued to lend support to the Church of the East, and in particular its new, 5-year-old Patriarch. However his views on Assyrian questions differed from those of Cosmo Gordon Lang, enthroned as Archbishop of Canterbury in December 1928, leading to Wigram's withdrawal from Assyrian affairs by 1938. Throughout this period, he continued to write, publishing a number of books on the Church of the East.

In about 1929 he returned to the UK, living in Wells, Somerset. He died on 16 January 1953 in Salisbury, Wiltshire.

== Publications ==
- The Doctrinal Position of the Assyrian or East Syrian Church, 1908
- An Introduction to the History of the Assyrian Church or The Church of the Sassanid Persian Empire 100-640 A.D. London: Society for Promoting Christian Knowledge. 1910. ISBN 9780837080789.
- The Cradle of Mankind; Life in Eastern Kurdistan, 1914; 2nd ed. 1922
- Intercommunion with the Assyrian Church, 1920
- Our Smallest Ally, 1920
- The Assyrian Settlement, 1922
- The Separation of the Monophysites and more, 1923
- The Assyrians and Their Neighbours. London: G. Bell & Sons. 1929.
- Hellenic Travel, 1947
