= Wigram (disambiguation) =

Wigram is a suburb of Christchurch, New Zealand.

Wigram may also refer to:

- Wigram (surname)
- Wigram (New Zealand electorate), an electorate of the New Zealand House of Representatives
- Wigram Aerodrome, a former Royal New Zealand Air Force base
- Wigram baronets, a title in the Baronetage of the United Kingdom
- Wigram Beer, a brewery in Wigram, New Zealand
- Wigram Museum, the Royal New Zealand Air Force Museum
- Baron Wigram, a title in the Peerage of the United Kingdom
