= Woolmore Wigram =

English clergyman and campanologist (1831–1907)

Woolmore Wigram (29 October 1831 – 19 January 1907) was a Church of England clergyman, a campanologist and a mountain-climber.

== Life ==
Wigram was born in 1831 at Devonshire Place, London the fifth son of ten children of Money Wigram (1790–1873) and Mary, daughter of Charles Hampden Turner. His father was elder brother of Sir James Wigram, Joseph Wigram and George Wigram. Of his brothers, Charles Hampden (1826–1903) was knighted in 1902, and Clifford (1828–1898) was director of the Bank of England. Wigram entered Rugby School in August 1844, and matriculated at Trinity College, Cambridge, in 1850, graduating B.A. in 1854 and proceeding M.A. in 1858. Among his friends at Cambridge was John Gott, afterwards Bishop of Truro.

Taking holy orders in 1855, he was curate of Hampstead (1855–1864), vicar of Brent Pelham with Furneaux Pelham, Hertfordshire (1864–1876), and rector of St. Andrew's with St. Nicholas and St. Mary's, Hertford (1876–1897). From 1877 to 1897 he was rural dean of Hertford, and in 1886 was made honorary canon of St Albans, where he lived from 1898 till his death, and was an active member of the chapter. A high churchman, Wigram was for many years a member of the English Church Union.

Wigram was an enthusiastic campanologist, and became an authority on the subject. A series of articles in Church Bells was published collectively in 1871 under the title Change-ringing Disentangled and Management of Towers (2nd edition 1880).

In his earlier days Wigram was an enthusiastic Alpine climber. He was a member of the Alpine Club from 1858 to 1868. His most memorable feat was the first successful ascent of La Dent Blanche on 18 July 1862, in the company of Thomas Stewart Kennedy, with Jean-Baptiste Croz and Josef Marie Krönig as guides (see his own account in Memoirs, 1908, pp. 81–95; T. S. Kennedy in Alpine Journal, 1864, i. 33–39: cf. Whymper's Scrambles amongst the Alps, chapter xiv.).

Wigram died from the effects of influenza at his home in Watling Street, St Albans, on 19 January 1907, and was buried in St Stephen's churchyard there. His wife survived him.

He married on 23 July 1863 Harriet Mary, daughter of the Reverend Thomas Ainger of Hampstead, and they had four sons, including William Ainger Wigram, and three daughters.

== See also ==
- Wigram baronets
