= Wigram baronets =

Baronetcy in the Baronetage of the United Kingdom

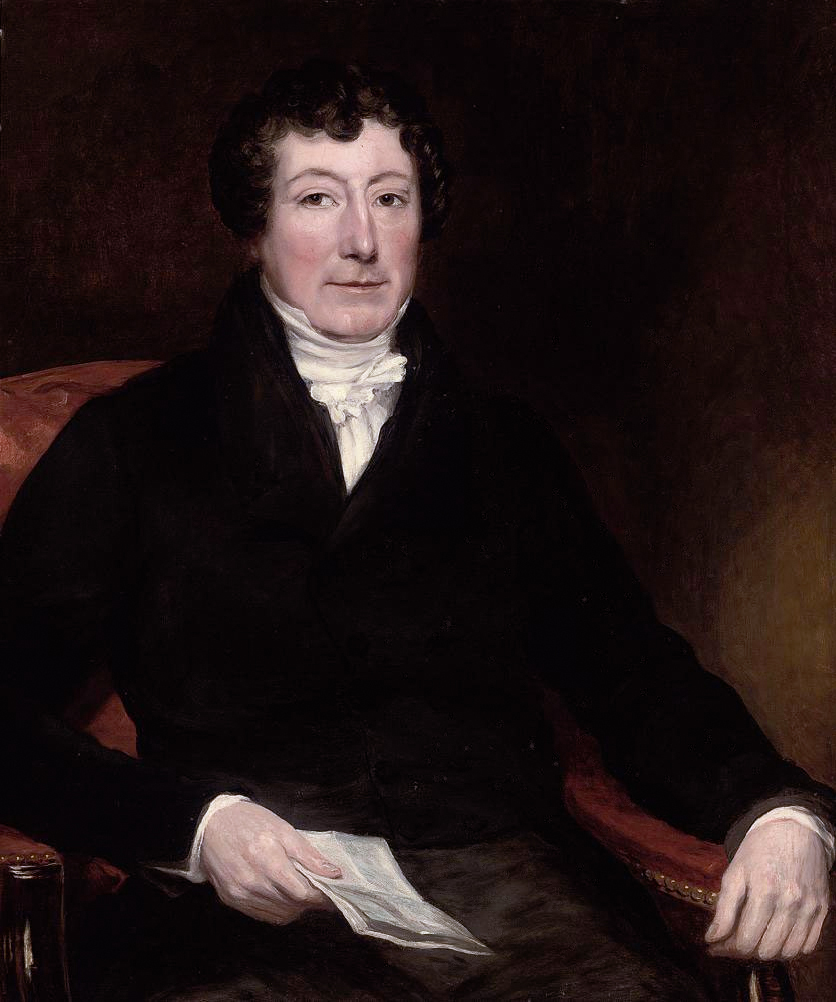
Sir Robert Fitzwygram, 2nd Baronet

The Wigram Baronetcy, of Walthamstow House in the County of Essex, is a title in the Baronetage of the United Kingdom. It was created on 30 October 1805 for Robert Wigram, a successful shipbuilding merchant and politician, representing Fowey and Wexford in the House of Commons. The second Baronet also represented Wexford in Parliament. He assumed in 1832 by Royal licence the surname of Fitzwygram. The fourth Baronet was a Lieutenant-General in the army and sat as a Conservative Member of Parliament for South Hampshire and Fareham.

Sir Joseph Wigram, James Wigram, Joseph Cotton Wigram, Loftus Wigram and George Wigram, younger sons of the first Baronet, all gained distinction. Civil servant and diplomat Ralph Wigram was the grandson of Joseph Cotton Wigram. Clive Wigram, 1st Baron Wigram, was the grandson of Reverend William Pitt Wigram, ninth and youngest son of the first Baronet.

== Wigram baronets, of Walthamstow (1805) ==
- Sir Robert Wigram, 1st Baronet (1743–1830)
- Sir Robert Fitzwygram, 2nd Baronet (1773–1843)
- Sir Robert Fitzwygram, 3rd Baronet (1813–1873)
- Sir Frederick Wellington John Fitzwygram, 4th Baronet (1823–1904)
- Sir Frederick Loftus Francis Fitzwygram, 5th Baronet (1884–1920)
- Sir Edgar Thomas Ainger Wigram, 6th Baronet (1864–1935)
- Sir Clifford Woolmore Wigram, 7th Baronet (1911–2000)
- Sir Edward Robert Woolmore Wigram, 8th Baronet (1913–2003)
- Sir John Woolmore Wigram, 9th Baronet (born 1957)

The heir apparent to the baronetcy is James Woolmore Wigram (born 1997), eldest son of the 9th Baronet.

== Arms ==
Coat of arms of Wigram baronets
Notes Granted 20 July 1807 by Sir Chichester Fortescue, Ulster King of Arms Crest On a mount Vert a hand in armour in fess couped at the wrist Proper charged with an escallop and holding a fleur-de-lis erect Or. Escutcheon Argent on a pale Gules three escallops Or over all a chevron engrailed counterchanged and on a chief waves of the sea thereon a ship representing an English vessel of war of the sixteenth century with four masts sails furled Proper colours flying Gules. Motto Dulcis Amor Patriae

== See also ==
- Baron Wigram

Baronetage of the United Kingdom
Preceded by Hartwell baronets	Wigram baronets of Walthamstow; 30 October 1805	Succeeded by Champion de Crespigny baronets
