= PS Ripon =

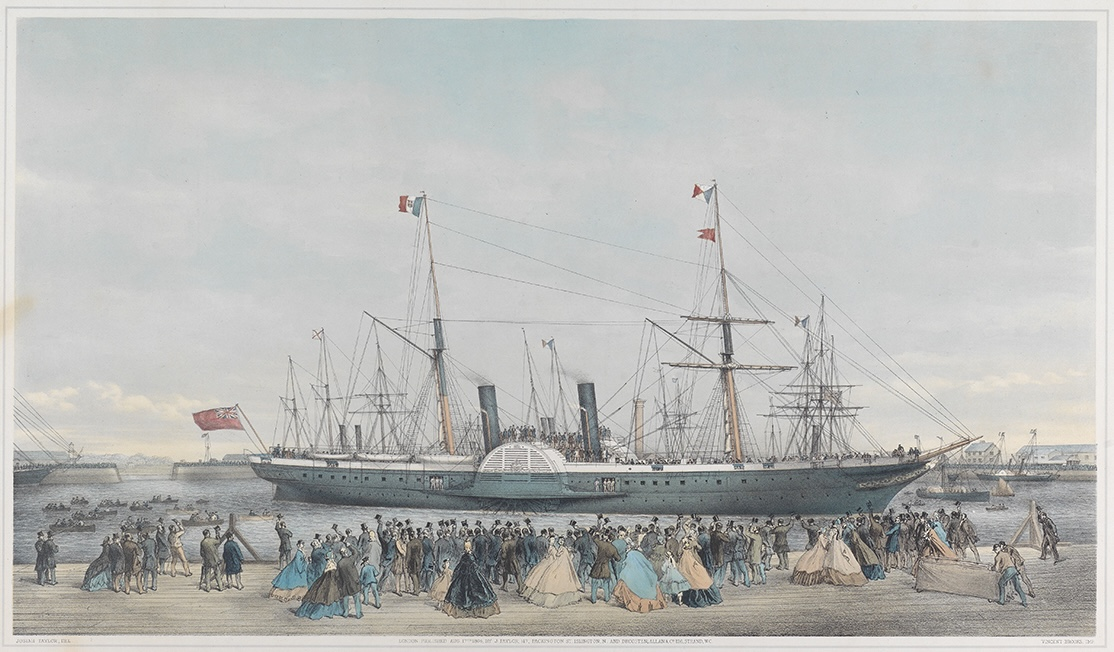

History

United Kingdom
- Name: PS Ripon
- Namesake: Ripon, a city in Yorkshire, England
- Owner: 1846-1870: P&O; 1870: Caird & Company; 1870-1871: Matthew Wilson and Joseph McLay; 1871-1880: George Turnbull and J. R. Greig; 1880: Gregory Turnbull
- Route: Mediterranean Sea to the UK
- Builder: Money Wigram, Blackwall
- Cost: £66,000
- Launched: 27 June 1846
- Home port: London
- Fate: Scuttled at sea off Port of Spain in 1880.

General characteristics
- Type: Paddlesteamer
- Tonnage: 1,508 GRT
- Length: 1846-1861: 217.3 ft (66.2 m); 1861-1870: 276.75 ft (84.35 m)
- Beam: 33.9 ft (10.3 m)
- Depth: 28.4 ft (8.7 m)
- Decks: 4
- Installed power: 1846-1861: 900 horsepower (670 kW); 1861-1870: 2,000 horsepower (1,500 kW); 1870-1880: engines removed
- Complement: 1st class passengers: 22; 2nd class passengers: 109; Troops: 1,000 on deck
- Crew: 60

The PS Ripon was a paddlesteamer built at Money Wigram's Blackwall Yard in 1846 for P&O.

== Operational history ==
On 12 October 1847, the maiden voyage of the Ripon to Malta and Alexandria was abandoned due to gale-force winds. The ship put into Torbay in order to repair damage it had sustained.

In 1850, Ripon brought Prime Minister Jung Bahadur Rana of Nepal and his entourage to the UK, docking at the Port of Southampton on 25 May 1850. A large collection of wild animals was also carried aboard the Ripon including the first hippopotamus seen in England since Roman times, which became known as the Regent's Park Hippo.

The Ripon was requisitioned in 1854 for use in the Crimean War along with 11 other Peninsular and Oriental ships. In 1857, it was reported in Scientific American that the Ripon was to be fitted with a propeller. In 1864 the PS Ripon brought Italian General Giuseppe Garibaldi to the United Kingdom for a meeting with Prime Minister Henry Palmerston. Three years later in 1870 the engines of the Ripon were sold and the vessel was converted into a brig for Caird & Company in Greenock.

In 1880, after serving as a hulk in Trinidad and Tobago, the Ripon was scuttled at sea near Port of Spain.
