= Port of Melbourne Authority v Anshun =

Judgement of the High Court of Australia

Port of Melbourne Authority v Anshun Pty Ltd
- Court: High Court of Australia
- Decided: 1 Sep 1981
- Citations: [1981] HCA 45, 147 CLR 589

Court membership
- Judges sitting: Gibbs CJ, Mason, Murphy, Aickin and Brennan JJ

Case opinions
- majority Gibbs CJ, Mason and Aickin JJ; Murphy J Brennan J

Port of Melbourne Authority v Anshun Pty Ltd (also known as 'Anshun') is a decision of the High Court of Australia.

The case is notable for originating the 'Anshun estoppel' doctrine in Australian civil proceedings. The rule estops parties from making novel legal claims, when those claims should have been pursued in an earlier legal proceeding.

Anshun is the 29th most cited High Court case as of January 2021.

== Facts ==
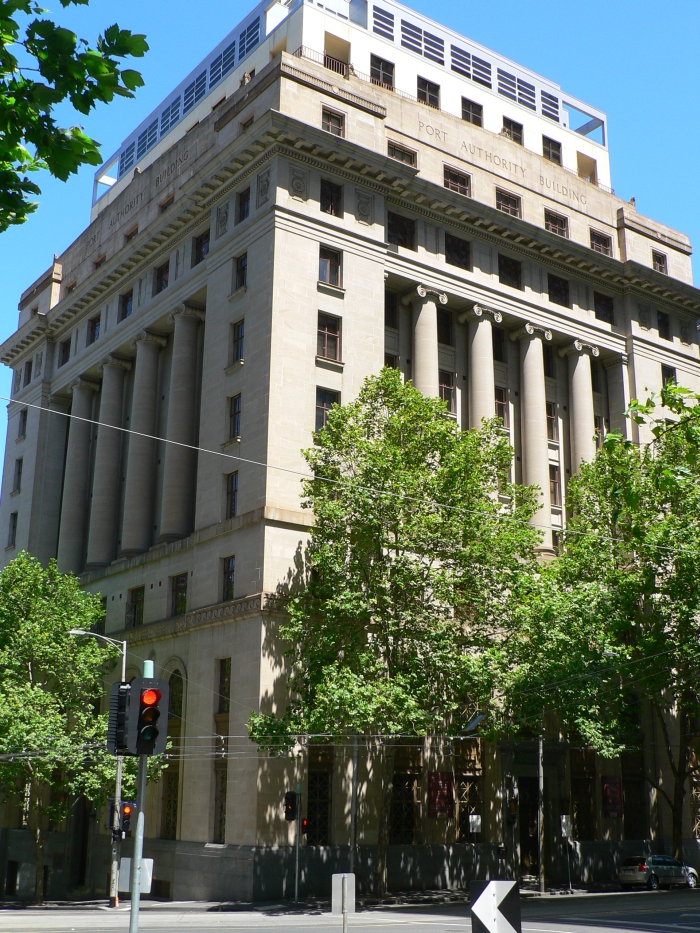
The former Melbourne Port Authority building

The appellant (the authority), lent a crane to Anshun Pty Ltd. While the crane was in use by Anshun, its load struck and severely injured a man named Soterales.

Soterales sued both Anshun and the Port Authority in negligence. The Authority and Anshun each claimed that the other had contributed to the tort alleged. These claims were contained within notices served under Victorian Supreme Court Rules. The notice of the Authority claimed contribution, but not an indemnity. This was despite Anshun having agreed in 1968 to indemnify the Authority in the crane hiring contract.

The negligence action resulted in a jury awarding ~$44,000 in damages for Soterales. No pleadings had been made regarding contribution. The jury had found both defendants jointly liable in negligence, also finding that the Authority would have to pay 90% of the damages, with Anshun paying 10%.

Subsequently, the Authority commenced an action against Anshun in the Supreme Court, claiming it ought to pay the Authority's share of the damages and legal costs. This was based upon the 1968 indemnity clause within the crane hiring contract.

Anshun's sole defence to this claim was in estoppel, claiming that the Authority could have raised its claim against Anshun during Soterales' original lawsuit against them both. Therefore, Anshun argued; the authority should be barred against seeking an indemnity.

The trial judge, O'Bryan J, dismissed Anshun's application for summary judgement. At the full heading, the primary judge held it was not a case of res judicata, or issue estoppel. However, he granted a perpetual stay on the grounds that the claim was on a matter which should have been raised in an earlier litigation, relying upon Henderson v Henderson. The Full Court agreed that while not an issue estoppel case, Henderson v Henderson applied. They held that as a reasonably diligent party would have raised the indemnity issue at the hearing; the Authority would be barred unless special circumstances existed. Finding none, they dismissed the appeal.

The Authority appealed to the High Court, submitting that the indemnity wasn't at issue in Soterales' action, and so shouldn't be prevented to litigate upon it now.

== Judgement ==
The majority decided that the case was not strictly one of issue estoppel, as the defence of indemnity hadn't been raised at trial. Discussing the UK line of authority regarding Henderson v Henderson, the court cast doubt on its precedential value. However, they accepted the 'powerful arguments based on considerations of convenience and justice which were associated with it'. The court also found that applying a legal test for abuse of process would not be helpful.

Regarding the reasonableness of raising the issue at a prior proceeding, the court said:

'There will be no estoppel unless it appears that the matter relied upon as a defence in the second action was so relevant to the subject matter of the first action that it would have been unreasonable not to rely on it. Generally speaking, it would be unreasonable not to plead a defence if, having regard to the nature of the plaintiff's claim, and its subject matter it would be expected that the defendant would raise the defence and thereby enable the relevant issues to be determined in the one proceeding. In this respect, we need to recall that there are a variety of circumstances, some referred to in the earlier cases, why a party may justifiably refrain from litigating an issue in one proceeding yet wish to litigate the issue in other proceedings e.g. expense, importance of the particular issue, motives extraneous to the actual litigation, to mention but a few ...

The test was then stated as being:

'... the likelihood that the omission to plead a defence will contribute to the existence of conflicting judgments is obviously an important factor to be taken into account in deciding whether the omission to plead can found an estoppel against the assertion of the same matter as a foundation for a cause of action in a second proceeding. By "conflicting" judgments we include judgments which are contradictory, though they may not be pronounced on the same cause of action. It is enough that they appear to declare rights which are inconsistent in respect of the same transaction.'

They then found against the plaintiff, writing:

It is for this reason that we regard the judgment that the Authority seeks to obtain as one which would conflict with the existing judgment, though the new judgment would be based on a different cause of action, a contractual indemnity'

== Significance ==
Anshun is significant for having forked Australian estoppel jurisprudence with that of England and other common law nations. The position in most common law jurisdictions (which follow England) is that if an issue is not barred by a finding of 'cause of action estoppel', or 'issue estoppel', the question then turns to whether an abuse of process can be established on the Henderson v Henderson line of authority.

Some commentators have characterised Australia's position as an extension of issue estoppel jurisprudence. Similar extensions exist in Canada.

The nature of Anshun estoppel as a doctrine has often been the subject of High Court proceedings. Complexities have arisen as to; the rule's application in group proceedings (such as class actions), and its relationship with abuse of process.
