= Holy Family Catholic School, Walthamstow =

Holy Family Catholic School
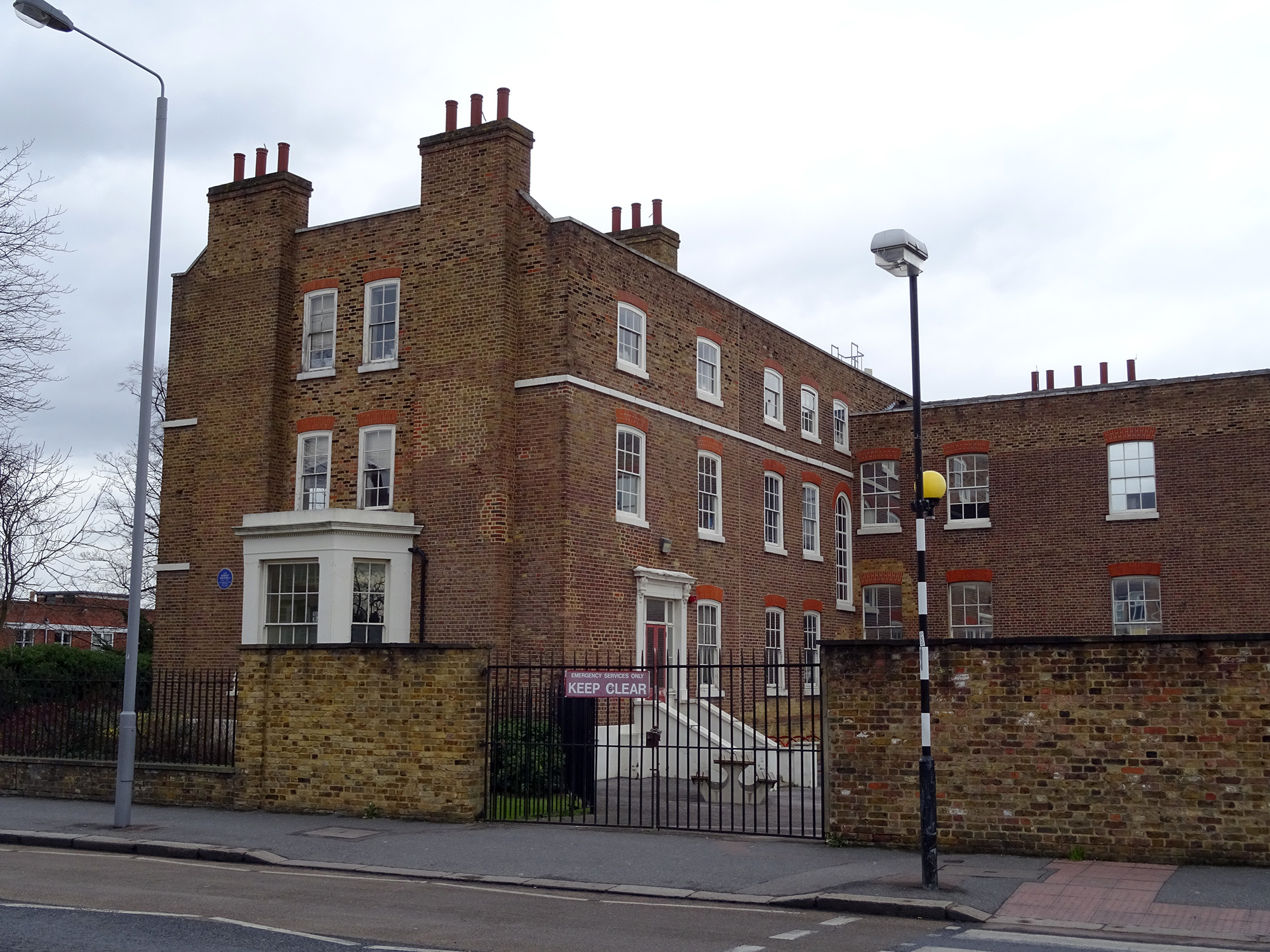

Location
- 1 Shernhall Street; Walthamstow, Greater London, E17 3EA; England; 51.58611°N 0.00847°W

Information
- Type: Voluntary aided school
- Religious affiliation: Roman Catholic
- Established: 1988
- Local authority: Waltham Forest
- Department for Education URN: 103106 Tables
- Ofsted: Reports
- Headteacher: Carolyn Laws
- Gender: Coeducational
- Age: 11 to 19
- Enrolment: 1,302 as of December 2022
- Website: www.holyfamily.waltham.sch.uk

Holy Family Catholic School (formerly Holy Family Technology College) is a coeducational Roman Catholic secondary school and sixth form in the Walthamstow area of East London, England.

== Description ==
First established in 1988, it is a voluntary aided school administered by Waltham Forest London Borough Council and the Roman Catholic Diocese of Brentwood. The school celebrated its silver jubilee throughout 2012 and 2013.

Holy Family Catholic School offers GCSEs as programmes of study for pupils, while students in the sixth form have the option to study a range of A Levels and BTECs. The school also has a specialism in Technology, and has dedicated resources to support the specialism.

== Walthamstow House ==
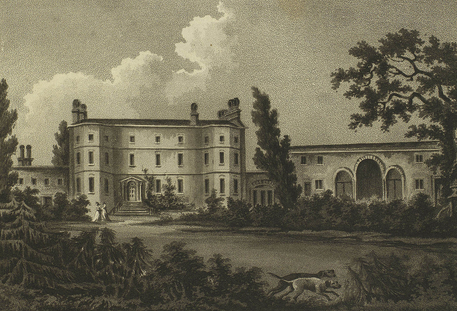
Walthamstow House home to Robert and Eleanor Wigram in 1802

The school's building Walthamstow House was bought by Sir Robert Wigram, 1st Baronet and he lived there with Lady Eleanor Wigram. She organised the first National School in Walthamstow. They were involved in a number of other organisations. Eleanor was into founding charities and Robert imported medicinal drugs and then, with Eleanor's advice, made some very successful investments. They had a huge family of children with a good number of over achievers.

== Notable students ==
- Lethal Bizzle - Rapper/ Grime artist
- Stephen Bear - Celebrity Big Brother winner 2016, Ex on the Beach Star
- Fleur East - X Factor, I'm a Celebrity...Get Me Out of Here!
- Lutalo Muhammad - British Taekwondo Athlete (Olympic Bronze and Silver Medalist)
