= Our Smallest Ally =

1920 book by William Ainger Wigram

Our Smallest Ally: a brief account of the Assyrian Nation in the Great War
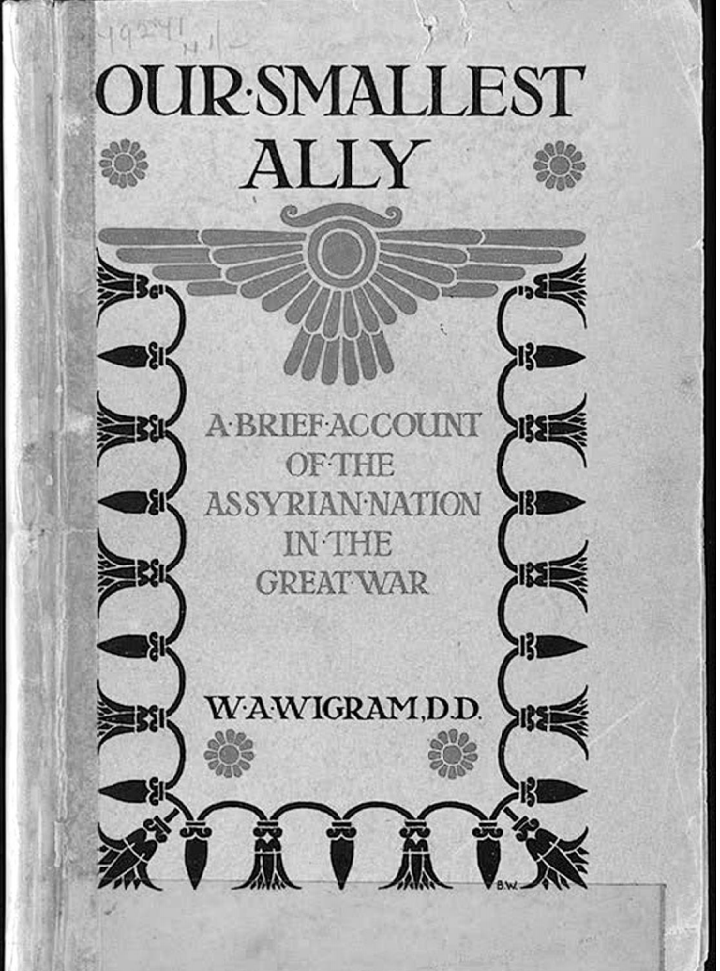
- Author: William Ainger Wigram
- Language: English
- Genre: Non-fiction
- Publication date: 1920
- Pages: 57

Our Smallest Ally: a brief account of the Assyrian Nation in the Great War is a pamphlet published in 1920 by William A. Wigram. Wigram, an Anglican priest part of the Archbishop of Canterbury's mission to the Assyrians, gives a first-hand account of contributions of the Assyrian volunteers during the Great War. He wrote: "Can Great Britain, now that she is responsible for order in the country, afford to neglect so valuable a military asset as this nation has proved itself to be?" He was an advocate for Assyrian independence.

Part of the book was republished in The Assyrian Star magazine in August 1977.

Scholar Heleen Murre-van den Berg wrote, "The pamphlet's frank criticism of British politics in Iraq made it an important source for contemporary and later anti-colonial Assyrian historiography, even if the pamphlet, like Wigram's other works, was firmly rooted in British imperial and colonial perceptions of the world."

== See also ==
- Assyrian people
- Middle Eastern theatre of World War I, Mesopotamian campaign and Persian campaign (World War I)
- Assyrian Levies in the British Mandate in Iraq
