= James Wigram =

The Right Honourable Sir James Wigram FRS
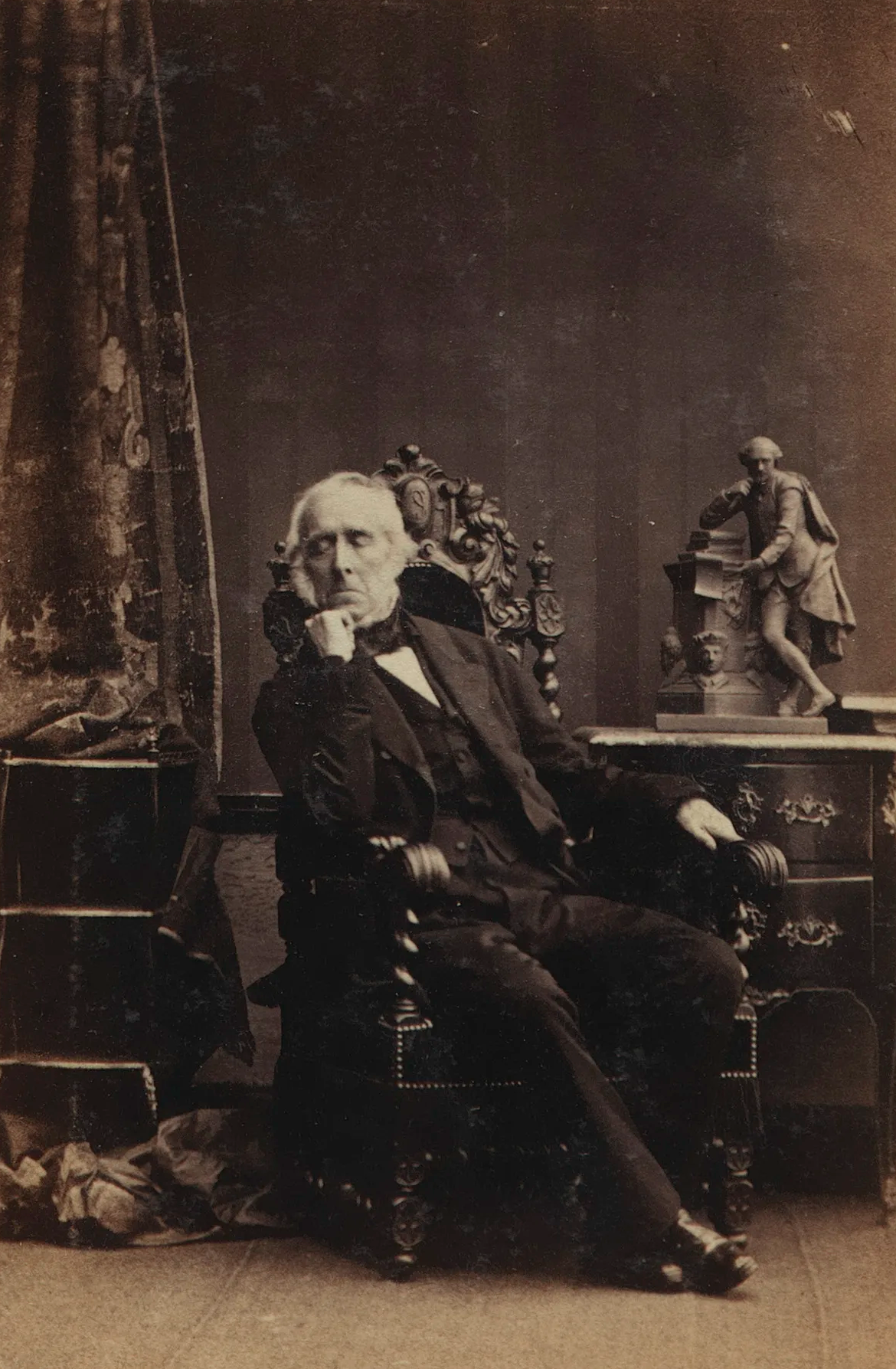
- Portrait by Camille Silvy, 1861

Vice-Chancellor of England
- In office 1841–1850

Personal details
- Parents: Sir Robert Wigram, 1st Baronet (father); Eleanor Watts (mother)
- Relatives: Sir Robert Fitzwygram, 2nd Baronet; Joseph Wigram; Octavius Wigram; Loftus Wigram; George Wigram (all brothers)
- Education: Trinity College, Cambridge
- Occupation: Judge
- Profession: Barrister

Sir James Wigram, FRS (1793–1866) was an English barrister, politician and judge.

== Life ==
He was the third son of Eleanor Wigram and Sir Robert Wigram, 1st Baronet, and younger brother name of Sir Robert Fitzwygram, 2nd Baronet in 1832; another brother was Joseph Cotton Wigram. Born at his father's residence, Walthamstow House, Essex, on 5 November 1793, James was educated privately and at Trinity College, Cambridge, where he graduated B.A. in 1815, gained a fellowship two years later, and proceeded M.A. in 1818. Admitted a student of Lincoln's Inn on 18 June 1813, he was called to the bar there on 18 November 1819.

In practice in the Court of Chancery, Wigram built up a career. In Michaelmas vacation 1834 he was made King's Counsel, and, in 1835 became a bencher of Lincoln's Inn. That year he also was elected a Fellow of the Royal Society.

Supported by his wife's family interest, Wigram fought an election for Leominster on Tory principles in 1837, but was defeated at the poll. He was, however, returned for the borough without opposition at the next general election, on 28 June 1841.

On 28 October 1841 Wigram was raised to the bench under the act for the better administration of justice (5 Vict. c. 5), which provided for the appointment of a second Vice-Chancellor of England. He was sworn a member of the Judicial Committee of the Privy Council on 15 January 1842, and received the customary knighthood the same month.

Wigram was compelled by ill-health, resulting in the total loss of sight, to retire from the bench in Trinity vacation 1850, when he was granted a pension of £3,500 a year. He died on 29 July 1866.

== Notable judicial decisions ==
Wigram's two most famous decisions were probably:

- Foss v Harbottle (1843) 2 Hare 461 (and the eponymous "rule in Foss v Harbottle"), and
- Henderson v Henderson (1843) 3 Hare 100

He was also the judge at first instance in Foley v Hill (1848) 2 HLC 28.

== Works ==
Wigram was the author of two legal works, Examination of the Rules of Law respecting the Admission of Extrinsic Evidence in aid of the Interpretation of Wills (1831, four editions), and Points in the Law of Discovery (1836). They led him into correspondence with Joseph Story.

== Family ==
On 28 October 1818 Wigram married Anne (d. 1844), daughter of Richard Arkwright of Willersley Castle, Derbyshire, and granddaughter of Sir Richard Arkwright. Her family owned property in the neighbourhood of Leominster in Herefordshire. He left a family of four sons and five daughters.

== Notes ==
Attribution

This article incorporates text from a publication now in the public domain: Lee, Sidney, ed. (1900). "Wigram, James". Dictionary of National Biography. Vol. 61. London: Smith, Elder & Co.

Parliament of the United Kingdom
Preceded by The Lord Hotham; Charles Greenaway	Member of Parliament for Leominster; June 1841 – October 1841; With: Charles Greenaway	Succeeded by George Arkwright; Charles Greenaway
