= Thorpe Coombe Hospital =

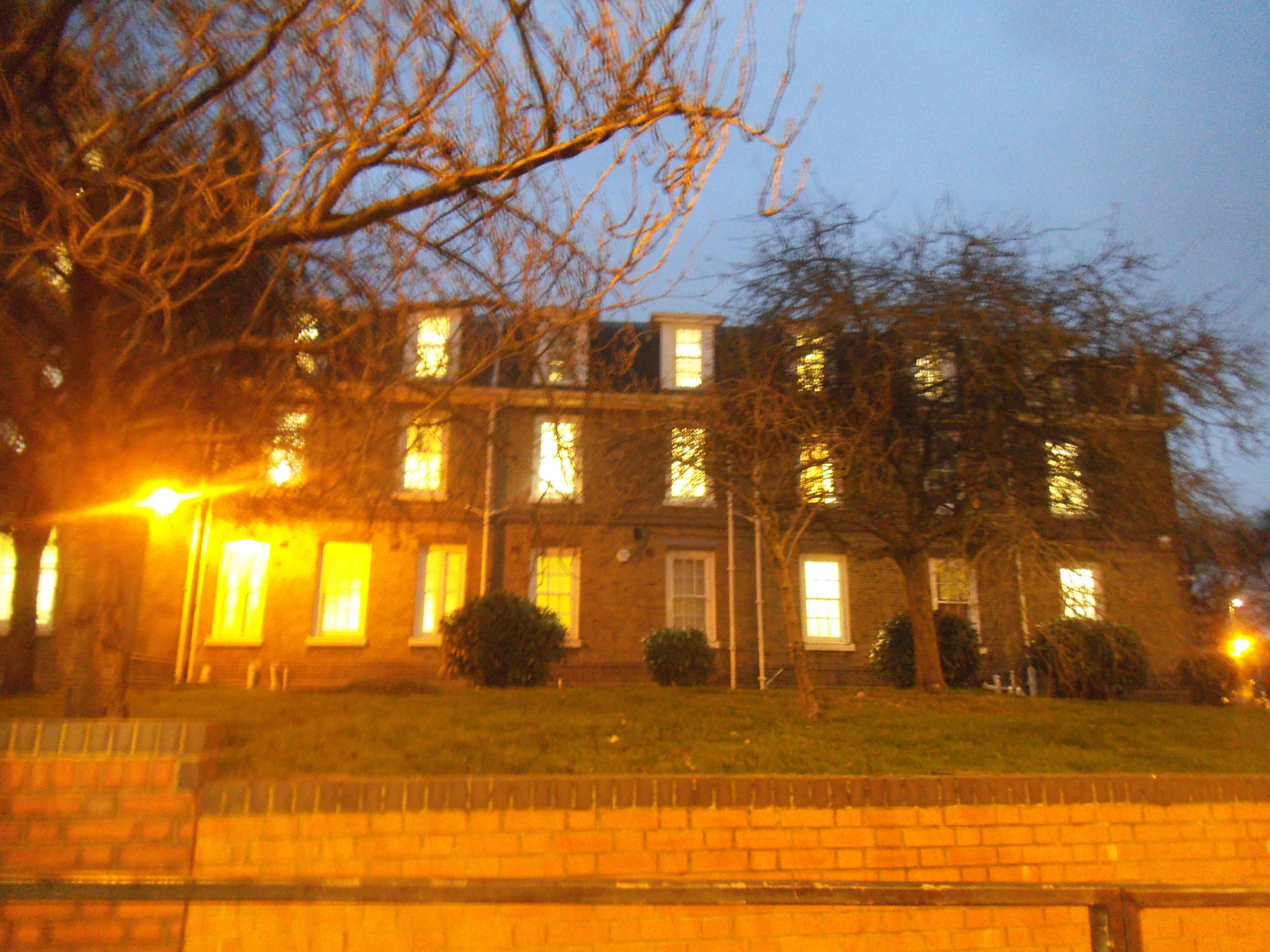
- Thorpe Coombe Hospital

- Location within Waltham Forest

Geography
- Location: Walthamstow, London, England, United Kingdom
- Coordinates: 51.5907°N 0.0079°W

Organisation
- Care system: National Health Service
- Type: Specialist

Services
- Emergency department: No
- Speciality: Psychiatry

History
- Founded: 1934

Thorpe Coombe Hospital was a psychiatric hospital and former maternity hospital in Walthamstow, London.

== History ==
Walthamstow Borough Council acquired a mansion called North Bank which had been owned by Octavius Wigram for the purposes of establishing a maternity hospital in 1929. The hospital was opened by Dame Janet Campbell, a leading physician, in April 1934. As a maternity hospital it had circa 70 beds. It joined the National Health Service in 1948. It ceased maternity facilities in 1973 and was subsequently used as a nurses' home, then a treatment centre for Alzheimer's disease patients and latterly as a mental health facility.

The hospital closed in 2017, and parts of the site were demolished to make way for a new health centre, known as the Jane Atkinson Health and Wellbeing Centre, which opened in November 2019.
