= Baron Wigram =

Barony in the Peerage of the United Kingdom

Baron Wigram, of Clewer in the county of Berkshire, is a title in the Peerage of the United Kingdom. It was created in 1935 for the soldier and court official Sir Clive Wigram, Private Secretary to King George V from 1931 to 1936. He was the grandson of Reverend William Pitt Wigram, ninth and youngest son of Sir Robert Wigram, 1st Baronet, of Walthamstow (see Wigram baronets for earlier history of the family). As of 2019 the title is held by his grandson, a former equerry to Prince Philip, Duke of Edinburgh, who succeeded in May 2017.

The first Baron's great-grandson, Captain Charles Malet of the Coldstream Guards, served as Assistant Equerry to Queen Elizabeth II in 2008. Captain Malet was commissioned in 2005 and has served in Afghanistan.

The family seat is Poulton Fields, near Cirencester, Gloucestershire.

== Barons Wigram (1935) ==
- Clive Wigram, 1st Baron Wigram (1873–1960)
- (George) Neville Clive Wigram, 2nd Baron Wigram (1915–2017)
- Andrew Francis Clive Wigram, 3rd Baron Wigram (b. 1949)

The heir apparent is the present holder's elder son, the Hon. Harry Richard Clive Wigram (b. 1977)

== See also ==
- Wigram baronets, of Walthamstow
