= Henderson v Henderson =

English court decision

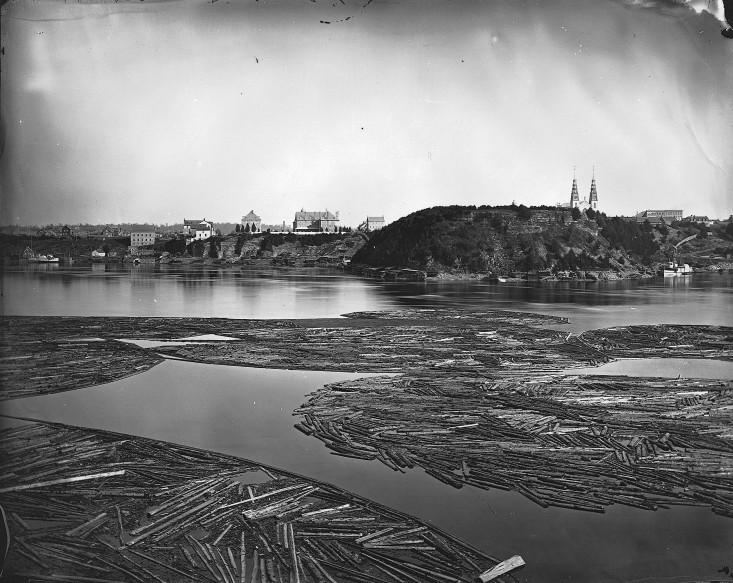
- Colonial Canada.
- Court: Court of Chancery
- Full case name: Bethel Henderson v Elizabeth Henderson and Others
- Decided: 20 July 1843
- Citations: (1843) 3 Hare 100, 67 ER 313 [1843] UKPC 6
- Transcript: CommonLII

Case history
- Prior action: Henderson v Henderson [1843] UKPC 6

Court membership
- Judges sitting: Sir James Wigram, VC

Keywords
- Issue estoppel

Henderson v Henderson (1843) 3 Hare 100, 67 ER 313 was a decision of the English Court of Chancery which confirmed that a party may not raise any claim in subsequent litigation which they ought properly to have raised in a previous action. The case remains good law, and is still cited as authority for the original principle today.

== Facts ==
In 1808 two brothers, Bethel and Jordan Henderson, became partners in their father's business which had operations in both Bristol and Newfoundland. In 1817 the father, William Henderson, left the business and subsequently (on a date not recorded in the case) died. Subsequently, in March 1830 Jordan Henderson also died, and he was survived by his widow, Elizabeth Henderson and their children, Joanna and William.

Jordan Henderson died intestate and his wife was appointed as his administrator. In 1832, Elizabeth Henderson brought legal proceedings in the Colonial Court in Newfoundland against her former brother-in-law, Bethel, alleging that he had not paid certain sums to her and her children which were due under the will of the older William Henderson. She also brought separate proceedings claiming he had failed to provide an account as executor of the will of the older William Henderson, and that he had failed to account for the interest in the partnership held by her late husband. In the end three sets of proceedings were joined, heard and determined by the courts in Newfoundland, and Bethel Henderson was ordered to pay the sum of £26,650 to his former sister-in-law and her family.

Elizabeth Henderson then brought subsequent proceedings in England to try and enforce the debt. In those proceedings Bethel Henderson sought to resist the claim, alleging that the decree of the Colonial Court was irregular. He further alleged that in fact it was the late Jordan Henderson who had drawn sums from the partnership in excess of his entitlement, and that accordingly it was Elizabeth Henderson who (as administrator of Jordan's estate) owed money to him. However, Bethel Henderson had not sought to advance any of these claims in the legal proceedings in Newfoundland.

== Judgment ==
The Vice Chancellor, Sir James Wigram, gave the judgment of the Court. He refused to allow Bethel Henderson to impugn the proceedings of the Colonial Court by seeking an injunction to restrain enforcement. He held that any action to challenge that judgment could only be made by way of appeal.

He also refused to allow the separate claim of Bethel Henderson against the widow. In a frequently cited passage, he held that:

where a given matter becomes the subject of litigation in, and of adjudication by, a Court of competent jurisdiction, the Court requires the parties to that litigation to bring forward their whole case, and will not (except under special circumstances) permit the same parties to open the same subject of litigation in respect of matter[s] which might have been brought forward as part of the subject in contest, but which was not brought forward, only because they have, from negligence, inadvertence, or even accident, omitted part of their case. The plea of res judicata applies, except in special cases, not only to points upon which the Court was actually required by the parties to form an opinion and pronounce a judgment, but to every point which properly belonged to the subject of litigation, and which the parties, exercising reasonable diligence, might have brought forward at the time.

== Subsequent decisions ==
The decision is still good law, and has been cited with approval numerous times, including:

- Johnson v Gore Wood & Co [2000] UKHL 65
- Virgin Atlantic Airways Limited v Zodiac Seats UK Limited [2013] UKSC 46
- Arnold v National Westminster Bank plc [1991] 2 AC 93
- Dexter v Vlieland-Boddy [2003] EWCA Civ 14
- Aldi Stores v WSP Group plc [2008] 1 WLR 748
- Henley v Bloom [2010] 1 WLR 1770
