= Neville Wigram, 2nd Baron Wigram =

British Army officer

The Right Honourable The Lord Wigram MC DL
- Born: George Neville Clive Wigram; 2 August 1915
- Died: 23 May 2017 (aged 101)
- Education: Magdalen College, Oxford
- Title: Baron Wigram
- Term: 1960–2017
- Predecessor: Clive Wigram
- Spouse: Margaret Helen Thorne (1941–1986)
- Children: Andrew Francis Clive Wigram; Margaret Cherry Wigram; Anne Celia Wigram
- Military career
- Allegiance: United Kingdom
- Branch: British Army
- Service years: 1934–1957
- Rank: Lieutenant colonel
- Service number: 66919
- Unit: Grenadier Guards
- Conflicts: Second World War: Dunkirk evacuation; Normandy landings
- Awards: Military Cross

George Neville Clive Wigram, 2nd Baron Wigram, MC, DL (2 August 1915 – 23 May 2017) was a British Army officer. He was a Member of the House of Lords before his exclusion in 1999, due to the House of Lords Act 1999 which excluded most members who inherited their seats. He sat as a Conservative.

He held the title of Baron Wigram, of Clewer in the County of Berkshire, from 1960 when his father Clive Wigram, 1st Baron Wigram died. His son, Major Andrew Francis Clive Wigram, 3rd Baron (born 1949), succeeded to the title on his death.

== Early life ==
Wigram was born on 2 August 1915 He was godson and a Page of Honour of George V. He resigned from the post in 1932.

He was educated at Sandroyd School, Winchester College and Magdalen College, Oxford. He was an Officer Cadet in the university's Officers Training Corps. He took a commission within the infantry contingent of the Oxford OTC on 7 February 1936, and became a second lieutenant with seniority from 7 August 1934.

== Military career ==
Wigram transferred from the Territorial Army, which he joined when he took a commission in the OTC, to the Grenadier Guards as a second lieutenant on 28 August 1937. He was given seniority from 30 January 1936.

During the Second World War, Wigram was involved in the Dunkirk evacuation in 1940. He was shot in the back, but was not aware of it at the time. He only found out later when he opened his backpack to find a bullet embedded in his soap-dish.

During a presentation he gave to a group of special needs school children at Coln House School, Fairford, Gloucestershire, Wigram described his experience at Dunkirk:

There was absolute chaos on the beach and a lot of the destroyers had been sunk. While we were there we were shot at from the Germans' aeroplanes but it was amazing how few casualties there were.

Wigram was promoted to captain on 30 January 1944, and returned to France during the Normandy landings that year. He then advanced through Europe with the Grenadier Guards. In April 1945, he was involved with the liberation of a concentration camp near Bremen, Germany. During the same presentation mentioned earlier, he described what they found at the camp:

This was a very small camp and it was occupied with prisoners of war and civilians. The civilians were mostly Frenchmen who had been deported from France and they were dying of typhus.

On 10 July 1945, (temporary) Major Wigram, Grenadier Guards, was gazetted as having been awarded the Military Cross "in recognition of gallant and distinguished services in North West Europe".

Wigram remained in the army after the war. From 1946 to 1949 he was posted in New Zealand as Military Secretary and Comptroller to the Governor-General, fellow Grenadier Sir Bernard Freyberg. He received promotions to major on 30 January 1949, and to lieutenant colonel on 9 May 1955. He retired from the British Army on 26 June 1957 as a lieutenant colonel on account of a disability.

== Later life ==
Upon the death of his father in 1960 Wigram became the second Baron Wigram, of Clewer in the County of Berkshire. On 8 October 1969 Wigram was announced as one of five deputy lieutenants commissioned that year by the Lord Lieutenant of the County of Gloucester. He turned 100 in August 2015.

== Death ==
Wigram died on 23 May 2017 at the age of 101. At the time of his death he was the longest lived person to have sat in the House of Lords.

== Personal life ==
In 1941, Wigram married Margaret Helen Thorne (1917–1986), daughter of General Sir Andrew Thorne. Together they had three children:

- Major Andrew Wigram, 3rd Baron Wigram (born 1949), who was married in 1974 to Gabrielle Diana Moore
- Margaret Cherry Wigram (born 1942), who, in 1972, married Lieutenant Colonel Greville John Wyndham Malet (they divorced in 1993)
- Anne Celia Wigram (born 1945), who, in 1973, married Major General Sir Evelyn Webb-Carter

Wigram had nine grandchildren.

== Styles ==
- George Neville Clive Wigram (1913–1935)
- The Hon. Neville Wigram (1935–1944)
- Captain The Hon. Neville Wigram (1944–1945)
- Captain The Hon. Neville Wigram MC (1945–1949)
- Major The Hon. Neville Wigram MC (1949–1955)
- Lieutenant Colonel The Hon. Neville Wigram MC (1955–1957)
- The Hon. Neville Wigram MC (1957–1960)
- The Rt Hon. The Lord Wigram MC (1960–1969)
- The Rt Hon. The Lord Wigram MC DL (1969–2017)

== Sources ==
- WIGRAM, 2nd Baron, Who's Who 2013, A & C Black, 2013; online edn, Oxford University Press, Dec 2012

Peerage of the United Kingdom
| Preceded by Clive Wigram | Baron Wigram; 1960–2017 | Succeeded by Andrew Wigram |
