= Loftus Wigram =

Loftus Tottenham Wigram QC (6 November 1803 – 19 September 1889) was a British barrister, businessman and Conservative politician.

== Life ==
Wigram was a younger son of Lady Eleanor and Sir Robert Wigram, 1st Baronet. His numerous brothers included Sir Robert Fitzwygram, 2nd Baronet (1773–1843), a Director of the Bank of England and a Tory Member of Parliament who changed his name from Wigram to Fitzwygram, Sir James Wigram, a judge, Octavius Wigram, Joseph Cotton Wigram, Bishop of Rochester, and George Wigram.

He was educated at Trinity College, Cambridge, matriculating in 1821, graduating B.A. (8th Wrangler) in 1825 (M.A. in 1828). He was admitted to Lincoln's Inn in 1824, and called to the bar in 1828.

He was a part-owner of Wigram and Green, shipbuilders.

In 1850, Wigram was returned to parliament as one of two representatives for Cambridge University, a seat he held until 1859. He was a regular contributor in the House of Commons, speaking 150 times during his nine-year stint in parliament.

Wigram married Lady Katherine Jane, daughter of Thomas Douglas, 5th Earl of Selkirk, in 1849. She died in September 1863. Wigram died in September 1889, aged 85.

Parliament of the United Kingdom
Preceded by Henry Goulburn; Hon. Charles Law	Member of Parliament for Cambridge University; 1850–1859; With: Henry Goulburn 1850–1856; Spencer Horatio Walpole 1856–1859	Succeeded by Spencer Horatio Walpole; Charles Jasper Selwyn
