= Eleanor Wigram =

British philanthropist

Eleanor, Lady Wigram
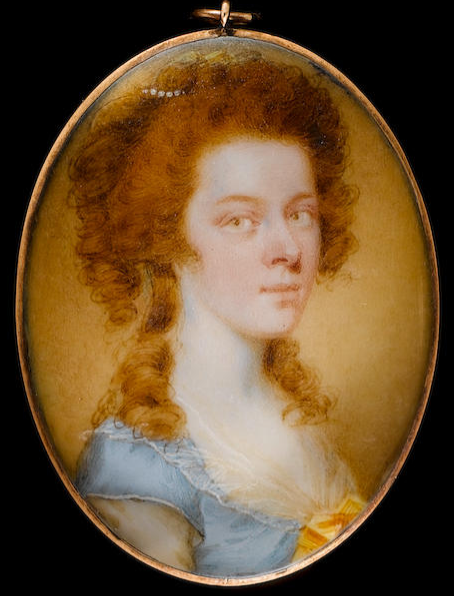
- by Charles Shirreff
- Born: Eleanor Watts; 1 April 1767
- Died: 23 January 1841 (aged 73); Walthamstow House
- Other names: Eleanor Agnew
- Occupation: Philanthropist
- Spouse(s): Captain Agnew, Sir Robert Wigram, 1st Baronet
- Children: 17 and six step children

Eleanor, Lady Wigram (née Watts, formerly Agnew; 1 April 1767 – 23 January 1841) was a British philanthropist based in Walthamstow, London.

== Life ==
Wigram was born in 1767. Her mother was Eleanor (born Wyatt) and her father was John Watts and he was the secretary to the victualling office of Southampton.

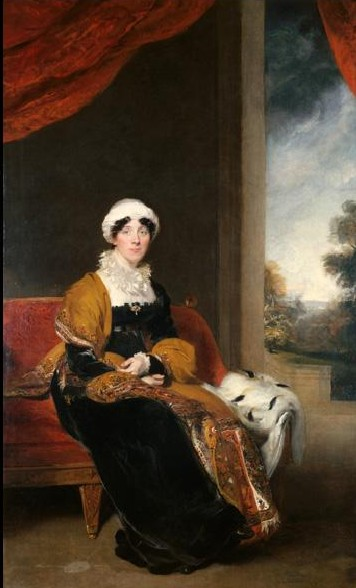
by Sir Thomas Lawrence

Her second husband was Robert Wigram. He already had six children and together they would have seventeen more. Despite this number of pregnancies Eleanor became a principal adviser to her husband concerning his investments and they did well. Her husband said, "I never did undertake any business of moment without consultation with my wife, and I can truly say it has much promoted my fortune."

In 1815 she was painted by Sir Thomas Lawrence who was knighted that year. Her portrait was exhibited in the Royal Academy and its composition is thought to reflect the contribution she had made towards her husband's success.

Eleanor was involved with local charities and the church in Walthamstow. In 1807 there was a workhouse and endowed grammar schools, but she created an Anglican school for a dozen children. The teacher of that school was trained in the Monitorial System where the cleverer students were encouraged to become teachers or helpers for less able students. In 1818 she suggested to several schools that they combine their resources to create Walthamstow's first National school.

The Walthamstow Female Benefit Society was her idea in 1815 and she became the patron. Via the church she was able to gather financial support of a guinea a year from the richer parishioners. This allowed others to pay a shilling a month and in return they were able to enjoy free medical assistance and advice. 1824 saw her start a local group for women to support the Church Missionary Society. Her husband died in 1830. In 1840 she was involved with the creation of a subscription library. Lady Wigram died in 1841 at Walthamstow House. Her house is still extant and it is now a school.

== Family ==
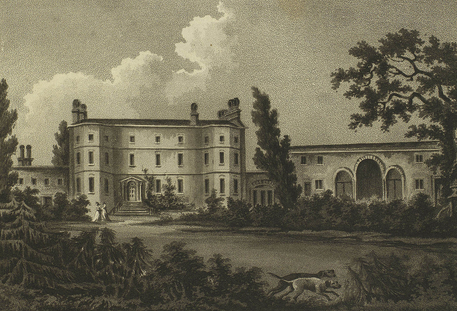
Walthamstow House in 1802

She first married Captain Agnew. Her second husband had married Catherine Broadhurst and they had six children. Following Catherine's death, in 1787, he married Eleanor. They had thirteen sons and four daughters. His children included:

- Sir Robert Fitzwygram, 2nd Baronet
- James Wigram
- Octavius Wigram
- Joseph Cotton Wigram
- Loftus Wigram
- George Wigram

Their son, Ely Duodecimus Wigram (1801–69), was a lt. colonel in the Coldstream Guards and compiled a scrapbook of the Crimean War, which contains a rare photograph of Mary Seacole.

Their son, Reverend William Pitt Wigram, was the grandfather of Clive Wigram, 1st Baron Wigram. Another notable descendant was Ralph Wigram, grandson of Joseph Cotton Wigram.

They had a daughter, also named Eleanor, who married H.N. Heathcote of Shephailbury in 1814.
