= Warley (East Indiaman) =

Two ships with the name Warley served the Honourable East India Company (HEIC) as East Indiamen between 1788 and 1816:

- HMS Calcutta was the East Indiaman Warley, built in 1788 and sold to the Royal Navy in 1795. She carried convicts to Australia in 1803. The French captured her in 1805, and she was destroyed in 1809 during the Battle of Basque Roads.
- Warley (1796 ship) was launched in 1795 at the same yard as her predecessor. She made nine voyages for the HEIC and participated in Nathaniel Dance's victory at the Battle of Pulo Aura while under the command of Captain Henry Wilson. She was sold for breaking up in 1816.
