= Sea Witch (1848 barque) =

History
- Name: Sea Witch
- Owner: Taylor & Co, London
- Port of registry: United Kingdom
- Launched: 1848
- Fate: Sold to Capt. R. McCully for the South America trade

General characteristics
- Class & type: Opium clipper
- Tons burthen: 401 tons
- Length: 121.5 ft
- Beam: 26.7 ft.
- Draught: 16 ft.
- Sail plan: Barque

The barque Sea Witch was an 1848 British Opium clipper and tea clipper. She sailed in the First Tea Race in 1850.

== Voyages and speed ==
Sea Witch sailed from Gravesend to Shanghai in 95 days.

== First Tea Race, 1850 ==
The First Tea Race from China to England took place in 1850. The first ship to load tea was "the barque Sea Witch, commanded by Captain Reynell of Waterwitch fame."

Astarte, an 1846 brig of 328 tons finished close behind the Oriental, which made a passage from Anjer to West India docks in 97 days. Reindeer, and Countess of Seafield both finished in less than 110 days, John Bunyan arrived in 99 days, from Shanghai.

"This the first of the international tea races, over-shadowed every other event in China in 1850; at the end of the sixties Taylor & Co sold the Sea Witch to Captain R. Mc Cully, who took her into the South American trade."
