= Sir Robert Fitzwygram, 2nd Baronet =

British politician and a director of the Bank of England (1773–1843)

Sir Robert Fitzwygram Bt FRS
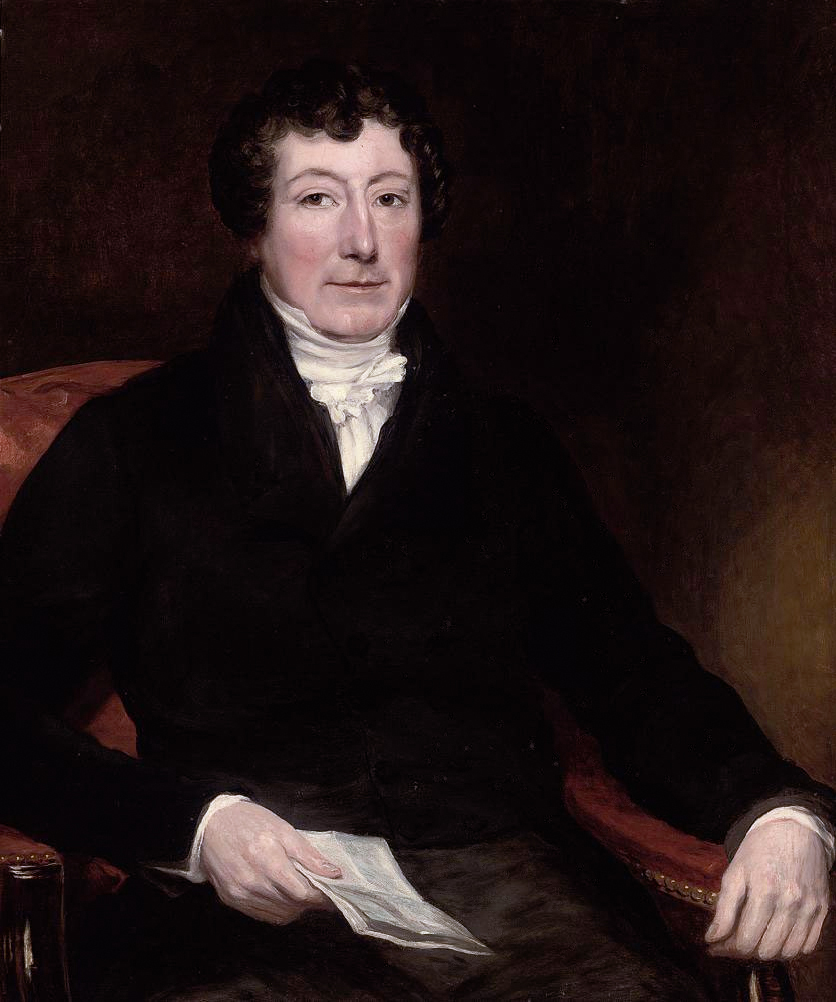

Member of Parliament for Wexford
- In office 1830–1831
- Preceded by: Sir Edward Dering, Bt
- Succeeded by: Sir Edward Dering, Bt
- In office 1829–1830
- Preceded by: Henry Evans
- Succeeded by: Sir Edward Dering, Bt

Member of Parliament for Fowey
- In office 1806–1818 Serving with Reginald Pole-Carew, William Rashleigh
- Preceded by: Reginald Pole-Carew; Robert Wigram
- Succeeded by: George Lucy; James Hamilton Stanhope

Personal details
- Born: Robert Wigram; 25 September 1773
- Died: 17 December 1843 (aged 70)
- Spouse: Selina Hayes (after 1812)
- Relations: Joseph Wigram (brother); Loftus Wigram (brother); George Wigram (brother); Octavius Wigram (brother)
- Parent(s): Eleanor Wigram; Sir Robert Wigram, 1st Baronet

Sir Robert Fitzwygram, 2nd Baronet, FRS (25 September 1773 – 17 December 1843), born Robert Wigram, was a Director of the Bank of England and a Tory politician.

== Early life ==
Fitzwygram was the eldest son of Lady Eleanor and Sir Robert Wigram, 1st Baronet, merchant and shipbuilder of Walthamstow. Among his numerous brothers were Joseph Cotton Wigram, Bishop of Rochester, Loftus Wigram, George Wigram, and Octavius Wigram, prominent in the City of London as a member of Lloyd's of London and as Governor of the Royal Exchange Assurance Company.

== Career ==
Fitzwygram owned a number of South Sea whaling ships in partnership with his father. Wigram was interested in the foundation of the London Institution in 1805.

=== Political career ===
He followed his father into Parliament in 1806 as Member of Parliament for Fowey. He was a Director of the Bank of England, and a Fellow of the Royal Society, and was knighted on 7 May 1818. In 1829 he was elected for the Wexford but was unseated on petition. He was re-elected in 1830, but was again unseated in petition in 1831. He inherited the Wigram Baronetcy on the death of his father in 1830. In 1832 by royal licence, he changed his surname to FitzWygram.

== Personal life ==
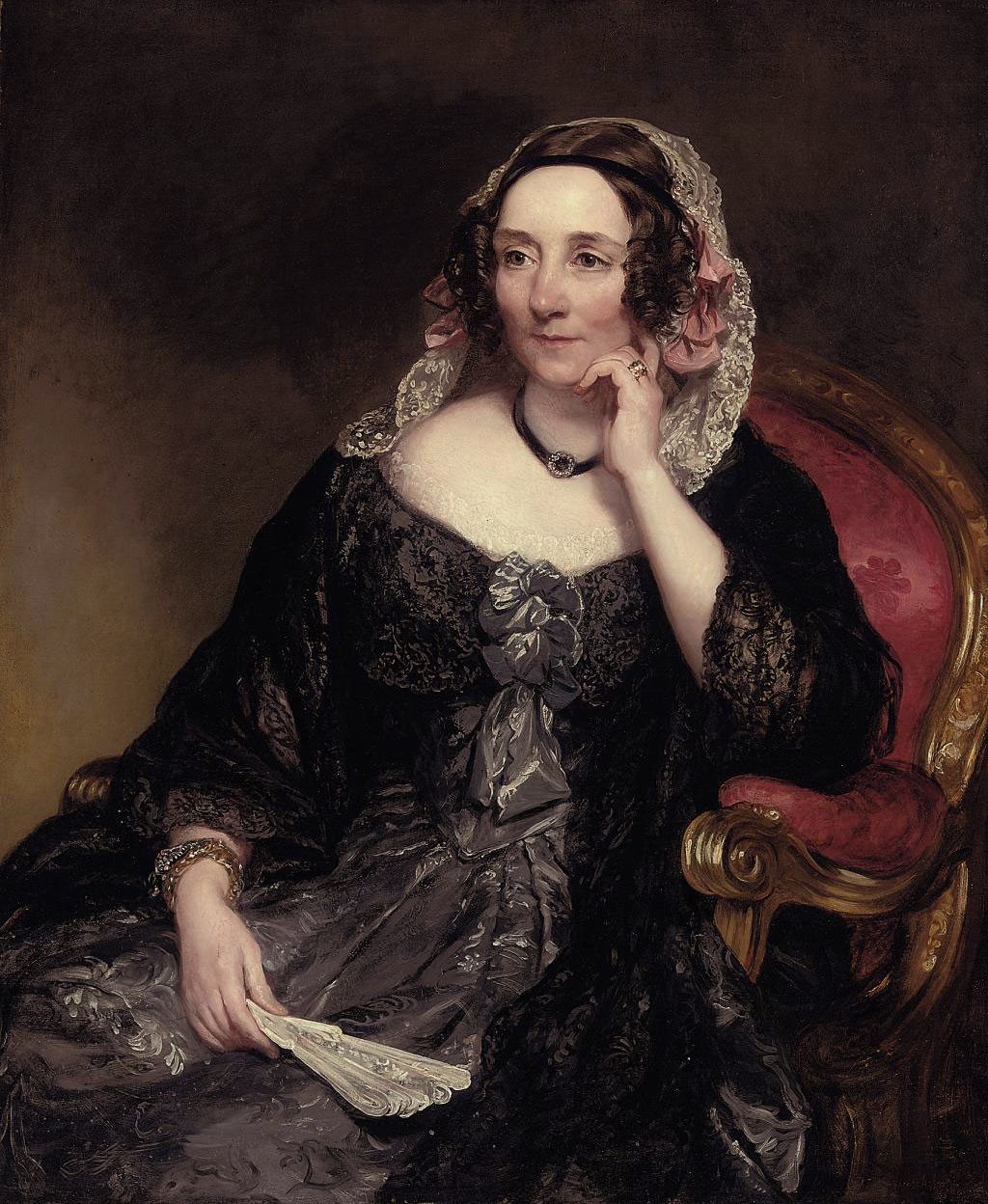
Selina, Lady Fitzwygram

In 1812, Wigram married Selina Hayes, youngest daughter of Sir John Macnamara Hayes Bt and Anne (née White) Hayes. (Note: Selina's maternal grandparents were wealthy New York City merchant Henry White and his wife Eve (née Van Cortlandt) White (a daughter of Frederick Van Cortlandt). She was a niece of Vice-Admiral Sir John Chambers White, General Frederick Van Cortlandt White, Henry White Jr. (wife of their cousin, Anna Van Cortlandt), Frances White (wife of Dr. Archibald Bruce), and Margaret White (wife of Peter Jay Munro).) Together, they were the parents of:

- Robert Fitzwygram Wigram (1813–1873), who inherited the baronetcy but died unmarried.
- Selina Frances Fitzwygram (1815–1890), who died unmarried.
- Eleanor Maria Fitzwygram (1816–1817), who died young.
- George Augustus Frederick Fitzwygram (1818–1841), who died unmarried.
- Augusta Catherine Fitzwygram (1819–1893), who married Sir George Baker, 3rd Baronet.
- Sophia Matilda Fitzwygram (1820–1824), who died young.
- Frederick Wellington John Fitzwygram (1823–1904), who married Angela Frances Mary Vaughan, daughter of Thomas Nugent Vaughan and a younger half-sister of George Forbes, 7th Earl of Granard, in 1882.
- William Harcourt Fitzwygram (1825–1832), who died young.
- John Fitzroy Fitzwygram (1827–1881), a Reverend who married Alice Ward, daughter of Sir Henry George Ward, in 1866.
- Cordelia Anne Fitzwygram (1829–1830), who died young.
- Loftus Adam Fitzwygram (1832–1904), who married Lady Frances Butler-Danvers, daughter of Hon. Charles Augustus Butler-Danvers and sister of John Butler, 6th Earl of Lanesborough, in 1866.

Upon his death, his eldest son Robert inherited the baronetcy but died without issue. The baronetcy then passed to Fitzwygram's third son, Frederick.

== Arms ==
Coat of arms of Sir Robert Fitzwygram, 2nd Baronet

Notes
Granted 20 July 1807 by Sir Chichester Fortescue, Ulster King of Arms
Crest
On a mount Vert a hand in armour in fess couped at the wrist Proper charged with an escallop and holding a fleur-de-lis erect Or.
Escutcheon
Argent on a pale Gules three escallops Or over all a chevron engrailed counterchanged and on a chief waves of the sea thereon a ship representing an English vessel of war of the sixteenth century with four masts sails furled Proper colours flying Gules.
Motto
Dulcis Amor Patriae

Parliament of the United Kingdom
Preceded by Reginald Pole-Carew; Robert Wigram (senior)	Member of Parliament for Fowey; 1806–1818; With: Reginald Pole-Carew 1806-12; William Rashleigh 1812-18	Succeeded by George Lucy; James Hamilton Stanhope
Preceded by Henry Evans	Member of Parliament for Wexford; 1829–1830	Succeeded by Sir Edward Dering, Bt
Preceded by Sir Edward Dering, Bt	Member of Parliament for Wexford; 1830–1831	Succeeded by Sir Edward Dering, Bt
Baronetage of the United Kingdom
Preceded by Robert Wigram	Baronet (of Walthamstow); 1830–1843	Succeeded by Robert Fitzwygram
