= Money Wigram =

English shipbuilder and ship owner (1790–1873)

Money Wigram (14 March 1790 – March 1873) was an English shipbuilder and ship owner, and a director of the Bank of England.

== Life ==
Wigram was born in Walthamstow in 1790, a son of Sir Robert Wigram, 1st Baronet and his wife Eleanor. From 1806 he worked at Blackwall Yard, a shipyard owned by his father since 1805. In 1813 he and his brother Henry Loftus Wigram each held an eighth share in the shipbuilder Wigram and Green. Sir Robert retired in 1819, selling his shares in the company to the other partners.

Wigram married in 1822 Mary Turner, daughter of Charles Hampden Turner, at Tandridge in Surrey. In 1823 he was elected a director of the Bank of England until 1824, holding the post again in later years. In 1832 he built the first ship on his own account, for trade to Australia; the Green family began to build a larger fleet of ships. The shipbuilding partnership Wigram and Green ended in 1843, and Money Wigram and Sons retained the western half of the shipyard, the eastern half being owned by Richard and Henry Green. Money Wigram and Sons were involved in trade to Australia; during the period of the Victorian gold rush they established a monthly service to Australia, and by about 1860 they had a fleet of thirty ships.

Money and Mary Wigram had eleven children, nine of whom reached adulthood. They included three sons who continued the business after his retirement: Charles Hampden, Clifford and Robert; and Woolmore Wigram, an Anglican priest.

In 1860 he bought Moor Place, a country house in Much Hadham, Hertfordshire, to which he added a south wing in 1861. He retired from the firm in 1862. He died in 1873, and was buried on 24 March in Hadham churchyard. Moor Place was sold after his widow's death in 1883.

Money Wigram and Sons built its last iron ship in 1876; the yard was bought by Midland Railway in 1877, and was developed as a coal dock. The shipping business continued until 1894, when its last ship was sold.
