= Octavius Wigram =

English businessman and ship owner

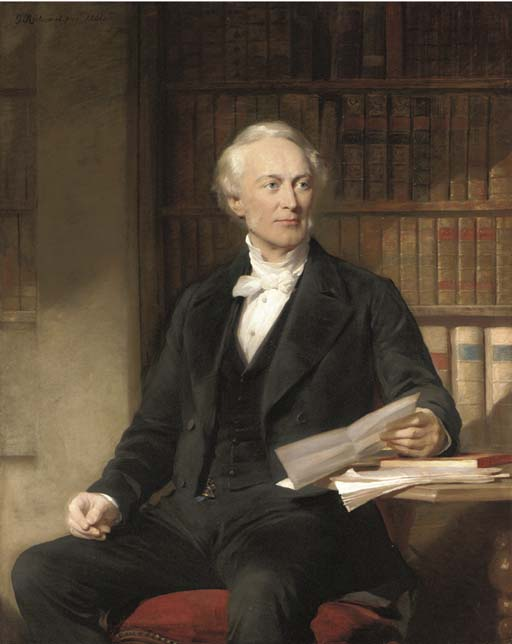
Wigram by George Richmond

Octavius Wigram (18 December 1794 – 20 May 1878) was an English businessman and ship owner in the City of London, a member of Lloyds and Governor of the Royal Exchange Assurance Corporation.

== Life ==
Born at Walthamstow House, Walthamstow, on 18 December 1794, despite his name Wigram was the twelfth child and seventh son of Lady Eleanor and Sir Robert Wigram, 1st Baronet (1744–1830) His father was a merchant shipbuilder and Tory politician who had a total of twenty-three children. He was educated privately at Shacklewell, and at the age of sixteen he entered his father's counting-house. In 1819 he became a director of the Royal Exchange Assurance Company, remaining with the company until his death.

Wigram joined the London and Westminster Light Horse (a Volunteer regiment) as a trooper. At the coronation of King George IV at Westminster Abbey in 1820, Wigram was on duty, guarding one of the doors of the Abbey, when the new king's estranged wife Queen Caroline tried unsuccessfully to enter the Abbey by force. She was turned away. In 1822 he was commissioned as a cornet in the same regiment.

From 1823 to 1831 Wigram is listed as the owner of two ships in the service of the East India Company. In 1824 he was elected a member of Lloyds, and on 24 March 1824 was married at St George's, Hanover Square, by William Knox, Bishop of Derry, to the bishop's daughter, Isabella Charlotte, who was a niece of Thomas Knox, 2nd Viscount Northland, later created Earl of Ranfurly. They had three sons and three daughters. Until 1830 the Wigrams lived at 36, Wimpole Street, Westminster. They then moved to Thorpe Combe House and in 1841 to Dulwich.

Wigram was a partner in Huldart's Patent Cables Company and Reid's Brewery Company, was on the Committee of Lloyd's Register of Shipping, and was a member of a Royal Commission of inquiry into the law governing pilots.

In 1870 he was still Governor of the Royal Exchange Assurance Company, and the next year the Company presented him with his portrait in oils by George Richmond. He died on 20 May 1878.

== Family ==
Wigram's eldest brother, Robert (1773–1843), was a Director of the Bank of England and a Tory Member of Parliament who in 1832 changed his name from Wigram to Fitzwygram. Their other brothers included Joseph Cotton Wigram (1798–1867), Bishop of Rochester, Loftus Tottenham Wigram QC (1803–89), a barrister and politician, and the theologian George Vicesimus Wigram (1805–79).

Wigram's eldest son, William Knox Wigram, born on 13 September 1825, became a barrister and married Mary Anne Pomeroy, the daughter of the 5th Viscount Harberton (1790–1862). Their sons Sir Henry Francis Wigram (1857–1934) and William Arthur Wigram were notable business men in New Zealand.
