= Joseph Wigram =

British churchman

The Right Reverend Joseph Wigram
- Bishop of Rochester
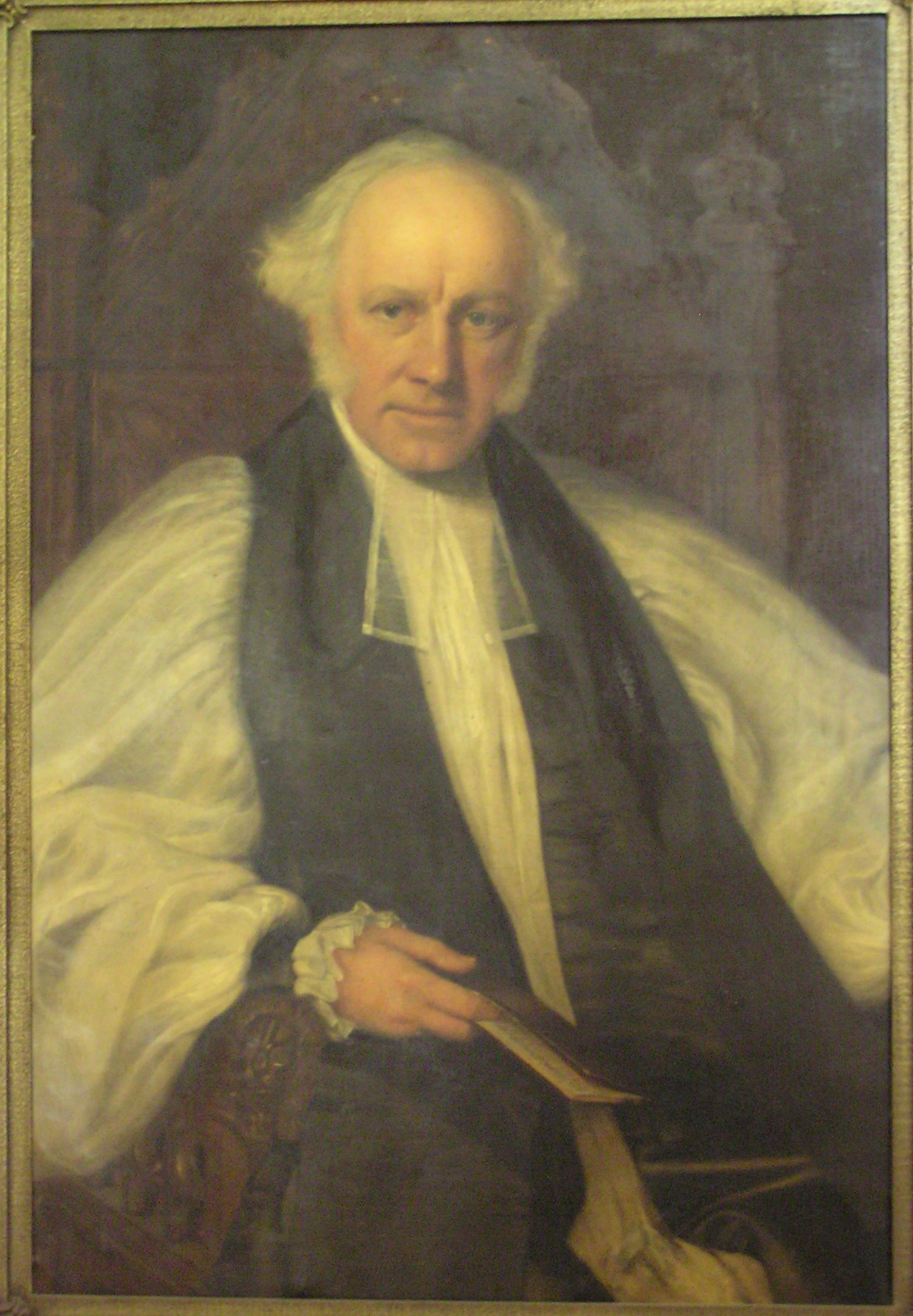
- Church: Church of England
- Diocese: Diocese of Rochester
- Elected: 1860
- Term ended: 1867 (death)
- Predecessor: George Murray
- Successor: Thomas Legh Claughton
- Other posts: Archdeacon of Winchester; 1847–1860

Orders
- Ordination: 1823 (priest)
- Consecration: 1860

Personal details
- Born: 26 December 1798 Walthamstow, London
- Died: 6 April 1867 (aged 68) 15A Grosvenor Square, London
- Buried: 12 April 1867, Latton, Essex
- Denomination: Anglican
- Parents: Sir Robert Wigram Bt
- Spouse: Susan Arkwright m. 1837; d. 1864
- Children: 6 sons; 3 daughters
- Profession: Author
- Education: Trinity College, Cambridge

Joseph Cotton Wigram (26 December 1798 – 6 April 1867) was a British churchman, Archdeacon of Winchester and bishop of Rochester.

== Life ==
Born at Walthamstow, Wigram was the child of Eleanor Wigram and Sir Robert Wigram, 1st Baronet (1744–1830). He was the brother of Sir Robert Fitzwygram, 2nd Baronet, Sir James Wigram, Octavius Wigram, Loftus Wigram, and George Wigram. He was educated by private tutors, and proceeded to Trinity College, Cambridge, graduating B.A. as sixth wrangler in 1820, M.A. in 1823, and D.D. in 1860.

He was ordained deacon in 1822, and priest in the year following, and in 1827 was appointed assistant preacher at St. James's, Westminster. In the same year he was also chosen secretary of the National Society for Promoting the Education of the Poor in the Principles of the Established Church, a post which he retained until 1839. On 28 March of that year he was appointed rector of East Tisted in Hampshire, and in 1850 removed to the rectory of St. Mary's, Southampton. On 16 November 1847 he was collated Archdeacon of Winchester, and in 1860 was consecrated bishop of Rochester in succession to George Murray.

On 1 March 1837, he had married Susan Maria (died 27 June 1864), daughter of Peter Arkwright of Willersley in Derbyshire and granddaughter of Richard Arkwright junior. By her he had six sons and three daughters.

Sons (partial list):

- Alfred Joseph (1839 - 1904)
- Arthur Henry (1840 - 1842)
- Gerrard Andrewes (1842 - 1917) m Selina Wilmot and had Gerrard Edmund (1877 - 1947; he became a vicar)
- John (1846 - 1943) m Gertrude Mackenzie and had Henry Joseph
- William Loftus (1852 - 1897)
- Walter Augustus (1856 - 1921)

Daughters (partial list):

- Susan Caroline (1828 - 1923) m: Major George Gooch Clowes
- Margaret (1843 - 1906) unmarried
- Edith Katharine (1851 - 1878) m: Atkinson Holden

He died in London at 15A Grosvenor Square and was buried on 12 April 1867 beside his wife in the parish church of Latton, Essex.

== Works ==
Besides sermons and pamphlets, Wigram was the author of:

- ‘Practical Elementary Arithmetic,’ London, 1832.
- ‘Geography of the Holy Land,’ London, 1832; 5th ed. 1855.
- ‘Practical Hints on the Formation and Management of Sunday Schools,’ London, 1833.
- ‘The Cottager's Daily Family Prayers,’ Chelmsford, 1862.

He also selected and arranged ‘Daily Hymns for the Month,’ London, 1866.

== Notes ==
Church of England titles
Preceded by George Murray	Bishop of Rochester; 1860–1867	Succeeded by Thomas Legh Claughton
