= Clive Wigram, 1st Baron Wigram =

British government official

Colonel The Right Honourable The Lord Wigram GCB GCVO CSI PC
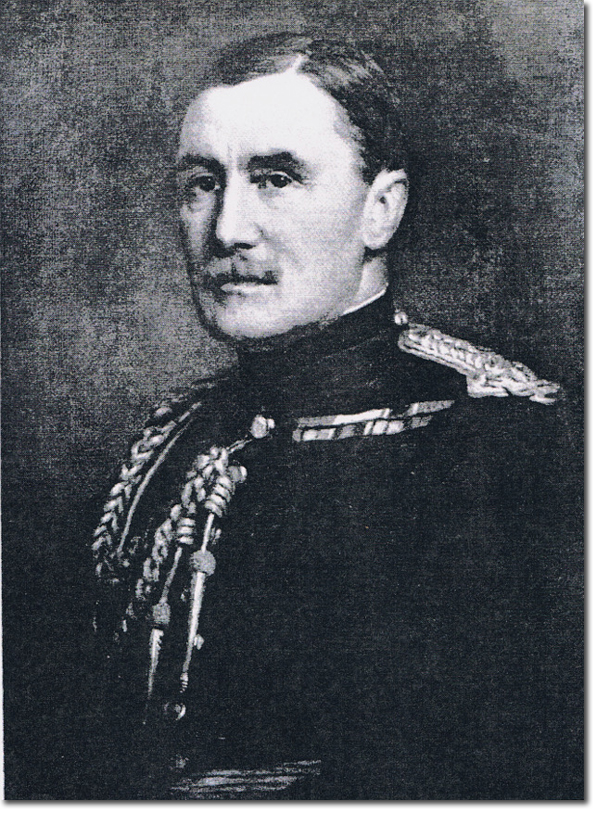
- Clive Wigram while in the 18th King George's Own Lancers.

Private Secretary to the Sovereign
- In office 1931–1936
- Monarch: George V
- Preceded by: The Lord Stamfordham
- Succeeded by: Sir Alexander Hardinge

Personal details
- Born: 5 July 1873
- Died: 3 September 1960 (aged 87)
- Spouse: Nora Wigram (née Chamberlain)
- Children: 3
- Education: Winchester College
- Alma mater: Royal Military Academy, Woolwich

Military service
- Allegiance: United Kingdom
- Branch/service: British Army; British Indian Army
- Rank: Colonel
- Battles/wars: Tirah Expedition; Second Boer War

Clive Wigram, 1st Baron Wigram, GCB, GCVO, CSI, PC, FZS (5 July 1873 – 3 September 1960) was a British Indian Army officer and courtier. He was Private Secretary to the Sovereign from 1931 to 1936.

== Parentage and education ==
Wigram was the son of Herbert Wigram. His grandfather the Reverend William Pitt Wigram was the ninth and youngest son of Sir Robert Wigram, 1st Baronet, who was a prominent merchant. Clive was educated at Winchester College, of which he later became a Fellow. After Winchester, he attended the Royal Military Academy, Woolwich.

== Military career ==
After passing out from the Royal Military Academy in 1893, Wigram was commissioned a second lieutenant on 4 October. Wigram served in the Royal Artillery between 1893 and 1897 and in the British Indian Army from 1897. He was promoted to lieutenant on 22 September 1897 (with rank from 4 October 1896). Wigram joined the 18th (King George's Own) Bengal Lancers, and served on the Tirah Expedition in the North West Frontier from 1897 to 1898. From 1899 to 1904 he was Aide-de-Camp to the Viceroy of India Lord Curzon, an office he had already filled in 1895 (under the Earl of Elgin). He resigned (temporary) in January 1900 to serve with Kitchener's Horse in the Second Boer War, for which he was mentioned in despatches. He was back as squadron officer in the 18th Bengal Lancers in April 1902, and was promoted to captain on 4 October 1902.

== Court positions ==
Between 1905 and 1906 Wigram served as Assistant Chief of Staff to the Prince of Wales in India. On 19 March 1906, he was promoted to the brevet rank of major and was appointed Equerry to the Prince of Wales, an office he held until the Prince became King in 1910. Promoted to the substantive rank of major on 4 October 1911, while in India he played first-class cricket for the Europeans club. Wigram then served as Assistant Private Secretary and Equerry to the King from 1910 to 1931. He was promoted to the brevet rank of lieutenant colonel on 3 June 1915. In 1915 he was promoted to lieutenant colonel, and later to brevet colonel. In 1919 he was promoted to colonel.

In 1931 Wigram was promoted to Private Secretary to the Sovereign and held office until he retired in 1936. He also served as Keeper of the Archives from 1931 to 1945, as an Extra Equerry from 1931 until his death, as a Permanent Lord in Waiting from 1936 to 1960 and Deputy Constable of Windsor Castle from 1936 to 1945. Apart from his careers in the Army and at court he was also a Fellow of the Royal Geographical Society and of the Zoological Society of London, President of Westminster Hospital and Governor of Wellington College and Haileybury. He was the first president of the Gloucestershire Boy Scouts

Wigram was made a Companion of the Order of the Bath 1918, a Knight Commander of the Order of the Bath in 1931 and a Knight Grand Cross of the Order of the Bath in 1933. He also became a Member of the Royal Victorian Order in 1903, a Commander of the Royal Victorian Order in 1915, a Knight Commander of the Royal Victorian Order 1928 and a Knight Grand Cross of the Royal Victorian Order in 1932 and made a Companion of the Order of the Star of India in 1911. He was sworn of the Privy Council in 1932 and in 1935 he was raised to the peerage as Baron Wigram, of Clewer in the County of Berkshire. He was further honoured in 1937 when he received the Royal Victorian Chain.

== Family ==
Lord Wigram married Nora Mary, the daughter of Sir Neville Francis Fitzgerald Chamberlain, in 1912. She died in 1956. He survived her by four years until he died in 1960 aged 87. The couple had three children:

- Anne Wigram (1913–1958). She married and had three sons.
- (George) Neville Clive Wigram, 2nd Baron Wigram (1915–2017) who succeeded to his father's barony.
- The Hon. Francis Clive Wigram (1920–1943 †). He was a captain in the 6th Bn. Grenadier Guards, as which he was killed on 12 September 1943 during the Allied invasion of Salerno in Italy during the Second World War. He is buried at Salerno War Cemetery. He was educated at Winchester College, like his father and brother, and his name is on the school's War Cloister.

Court offices
Preceded by The Lord Stamfordham	Private Secretary to the Sovereign; 1931–1936	Succeeded by Sir Alexander Hardinge
Peerage of the United Kingdom
New creation	Baron Wigram; 1935–1960	Succeeded by George Wigram
