= George Wigram =

English theologian (1805–1879)

George Vicesimus Wigram (28 March 1805 – 1 February 1879) was an English biblical scholar and theologian.

== Early life ==
He was the 20th child (hence his middle name) of Sir Robert Wigram, 1st Baronet, a famous and wealthy merchant, and the 14th child of Lady Eleanor Wigram, Robert's 2nd wife (an aunt to Charles Stewart Parnell). His family were all capable and several of his siblings became illustrious in their own field. Sir James Wigram became a judge and Vice-Chancellor; Joseph Cotton Wigram became Bishop of Rochester, Loftus Wigram was a barrister and politician, and Octavius Wigram was prominent as an insurance underwriter in the City of London.

As a young man George Wigram obtained a commission in the army. One of his postings was to Brussels. He spent an evening exploring the Waterloo battlefield and it was here he had a religious experience that changed his life. He wrote of it thus, "suddenly there came on my soul a something I had never known before. It was as if some One, Infinite and Almighty, knowing everything, full of the deepest, tenderest interest in myself, though utterly and entirely abhorring everything in, and connected with me, made known to me that He pitied and loved myself". This led to his resigning his commission in the army and in 1826 he entered The Queen's College, Oxford, with the intention of becoming an Anglican clergyman.

== Christian career ==
At Oxford he met John Nelson Darby and Benjamin Wills Newton. Dissatisfied with the established church, Wigram and his friends left the Anglican church and helped establish non-denominational assemblies which became known as the Plymouth Brethren. He had considered joining Anthony Norris Groves and his mission to Baghdad in June 1829, but changed his mind just prior to the faith mission set off. After leaving Oxford University, Wigram, using his family wealth, in 1831 bought church premises in Plymouth and there established a Brethren assembly. During the 1830s Wigram also financed the establishment of assemblies in London.

Wigram had a keen interest in the original Hebrew and Greek texts of the Bible, which was of great interest to the emerging Brethren assemblies. In 1839, after years of work and financial investment, he published The Englishman's Greek and English Concordance to the New Testament, followed in 1843 by The Englishman's Hebrew and Chaldee Concordance to the Old Testament. He also edited the influential Brethren periodical Present Testimony and Original Christian Witness for many years (from 1849 to his death with posthumous issues running to 1881). This periodical superseded the Brethren's first magazine, The Christian Witness. Besides his literary work his oral ministry was considered to be marked by an attractive freshness: a contemporary remarked that his "very face became radiant as he spoke". Many of his addresses have been preserved and published in the two volumes Memorials of the Ministry of G.V. Wigram and Gleanings from the Teaching of G.V. Wigram. These were collected by the erstwhile Lewisham Road Baptist Church Minister, Edward Dennett.

With Wigram's help, Darby became the most influential personality within the Brethren movement. Wigram is often referred to as being Darby's lieutenant as he firmly supported Darby during moments of crisis. In 1845 he supported Darby in his doctrinal differences with Benjamin Wills Newton in the Brethren assembly at Plymouth. In Darby's 1848 dispute with George Müller, Wigram again sided with Darby in relation to the reception of believers who had previously been in fellowship with Newton, and on Müller's reluctance to publicly denounce errors by Newton in regards to the sufferings of Christ (errors which Newton had already retracted). He also helped Darby fend off accusations of heresy, also in regards to the sufferings of Christ, in articles written in 1858 and 1866, which some considered were very similar to Newton's errors two decades earlier.

== Married life ==
Wigram married Fanny Bligh in 1830, the daughter of Thomas Cherburgh Bligh MP whom Wigram had known as a girl in Ireland; she died in 1834. His second marriage was to Catherine, the only daughter of William Parnell of Avondale. Their London home was 3 Howley Place, Harrow Road, London. In 1867, Wigram visited Canada. His wife Catherine joined him there two months later, but became ill and died after a short illness in Canada. The family physician was Limerick-born Dr Thomas Mackern. Wigram was 62 years old. Four years later his daughter Fanny Theodosia, child of his first wife, died.

== Travels ==
Wigram travelled in the UK preaching and teaching in large Brethren assemblies. He visited Switzerland in 1853 and again in Vaud Canton in 1858. In later life he went abroad to minister to the many overseas assemblies of the Brethren, including Boston and Canada in 1867. Writing in November 1871, from Demerara, British Guiana, he said, "I came out in my old age, none save Himself with me". He visited Jamaica in 1872. This led to further travel, visiting Australia and New Zealand in 1873-75 and again in 1877–78.

Besides travel he maintained a wide correspondence with labourers in emerging Brethren assemblies. Among these were Louis Favez of Mauritius.

== Hymnology ==
Wigram contributed to the hymnology of the Brethren assemblies in a number of ways. He edited the anthology Hymns for the Poor of the Flock (1838). This collection contained hymns by Isaac Watts, Charles Wesley, William Cowper, Thomas Kelly and others; and an appendix was added, chiefly to include a number of hymns by Sir Edward Denny that had just been written. The four earliest of John Nelson Darby's were also inserted. 18 years later (1856) Wigram compiled A Few Hymns and some Spiritual Songs for the Little Flock to replace the previous collection. This hymnbook was revised by Darby in 1881, William Kelly in 1894 and again by T.H. Reynolds in 1903.

Wigram also wrote a number of hymns and these include the following

- Well may we sing, with triumph sing
- Oh, what a debt we owe
- The Person of the Christ
- What raised the wondrous thought

== Death ==
Wigram died in 1879 at the age of 74 and was buried with his daughter in Paddington Cemetery by the side of Sir Edward Denny. It has been said that the large concourse of people there sang a hymn in deference to his wish expressed in his lifetime, so that all might understand that he owed all to the sovereign mercy of God. The hymn sung was: "Nothing but mercy'll do for me, / Nothing but mercy – full and free, / Of sinners chief – what but the blood / Could calm my soul, before my God".
