= Sir Robert Wigram, 1st Baronet =

British merchant shipbuilder and Tory politician

Sir Robert Wigram Bt
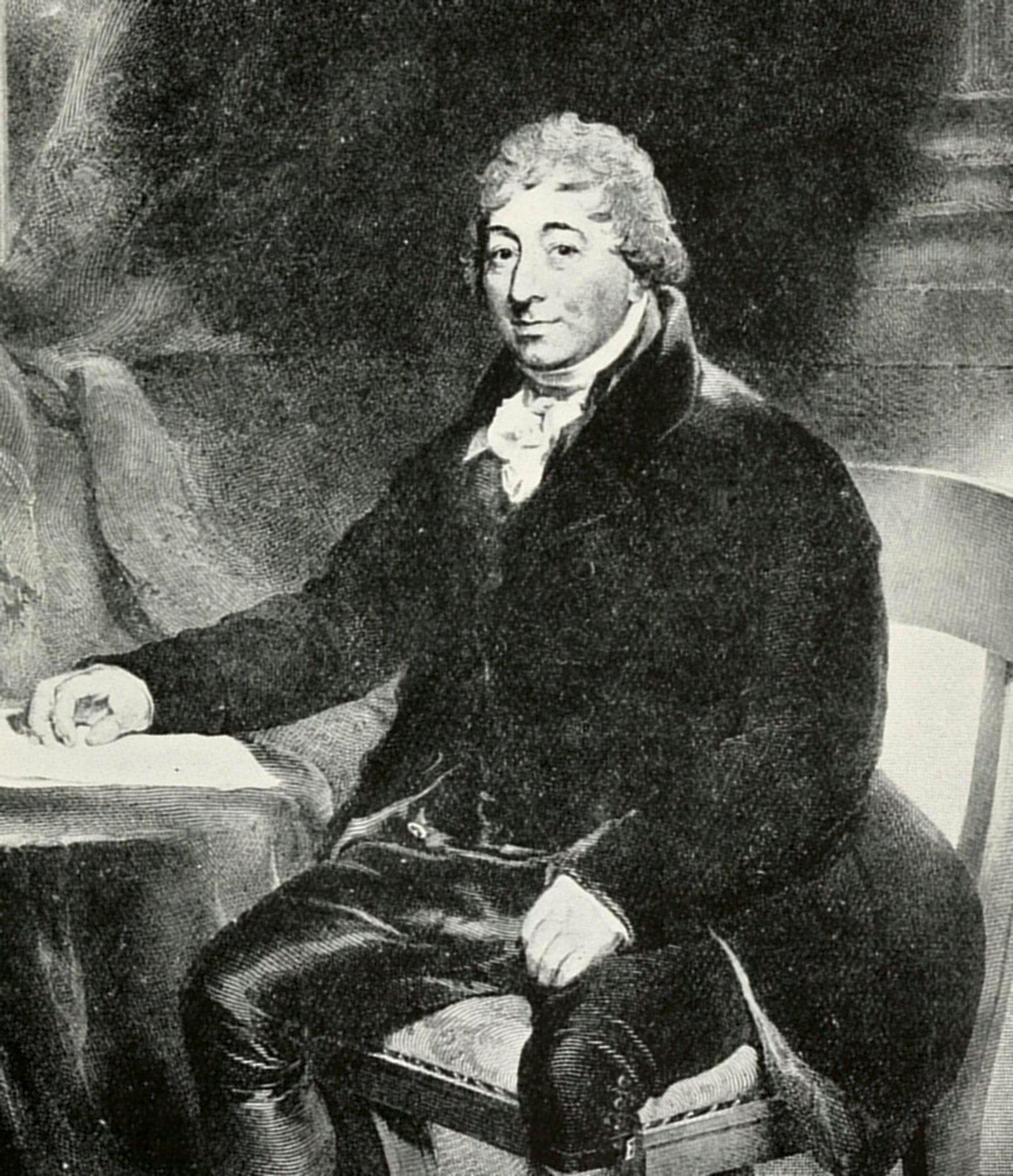
- Born: 30 January 1744
- Died: 6 November 1830 (aged 86)
- Citizenship: British
- Occupations: Businessman and member of parliament
- Title: Baronet
- Spouses: Catherine Broadhurst, Eleanor Watts

Sir Robert Wigram, 1st Baronet (30 January 1744 – 6 November 1830) was a British merchant shipbuilder and Tory politician who sat in the House of Commons of the United Kingdom between 1802 and 1807.

== Background ==
Wigram was born at Wexford, the only son of John Wigram, merchant, of Bristol, and his wife Mary Clifford, daughter of Robert Clifford of Wexford and granddaughter of Highgate Boyd.

== Public life ==
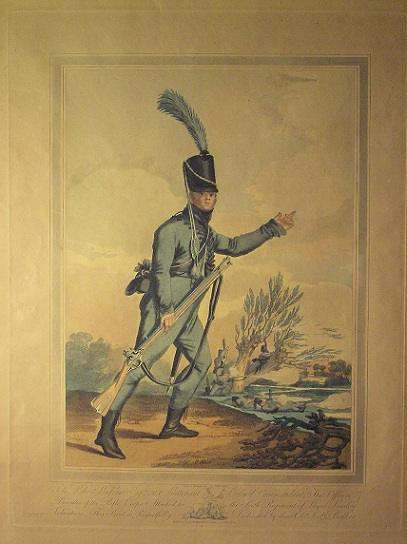
Sir Robert Wigram, Bt.

In 1762, Wigram took up an apprenticeship with Dr Allen of Dulwich London, and two years later, he was a fully qualified surgeon. He sailed to India on the East Indiaman Admiral Watson as ship's surgeon, but retired from this position in 1772 because of failing health, and became a successful merchant. He developed the family's mercantile activities and made several voyages to India in the service of the company. He was the sole, or at least principal owner, of several vessels trading to Bengal, Madras, and Bombay, and was one of the greatest importers of drugs in England. He was also involved in South Seas whaling and owned at least seven vessels operating in the trade between 1795 and 1807.

Wigram became member of parliament for Fowey in 1802 and was a strong supporter of William Pitt. He was chairman of the meeting of the merchants and bankers during the French Revolution, and was instrumental in raising the regiment of the Sixth Royal London Volunteers, becoming their lieutenant-colonel in September 1803. Also in July 1803, he led a group of shipowners in securing an act "for the further improvement of the Port of London", by making docks and other works at Blackwall for the accommodation of the East India shipping, and established the East India Dock Company. He was created a baronet on 20 October 1805. At the general election in 1806, he was chosen for the Wexford but after the dissolution in 1807, he retired from public life. He was a vice-president of the Pitt Club. He had partnerships in the Blackwall Yard, Reid's Brewery, and Huddart's Rope Works. In 1805, he bought a large share of Deptford shipbuilders, formerly Perry, Wells & Green, and the firm became Wigram, Wells & Green. By 1813, Wigram had taken over all of Wells' interest and it became Wigram & Green. He owned half the business, his sons Money and Loftus Wigram a quarter, and Green the remaining quarter. Wigram retired in 1819 and sold his half to the other partners. He was appointed High Sheriff of Essex for 1812–13, as Perry had been before him.

Wigram died at Walthamstow House, his home at Walthamstow, Essex, at the age of 86.

== Family ==
Wigram was twice married and had a large family of 23 children. His first wife was Catherine Broadhurst, by whom be had six children. Following Catherine's death, in 1787, he married Eleanor (born Watts), widow of Captain Agnew and daughter of John Watts, secretary to the victualling office of Southampton. They had thirteen sons and four daughters. His children included:

- Sir Robert Fitzwygram, 2nd Baronet
- James Wigram
- Octavius Wigram
- Joseph Cotton Wigram
- Money Wigram
- Loftus Wigram
- George Wigram.

His 12th son, Ely Duodecimus Wigram (1801–1869), was a lieutenant-colonel in the Coldstream Guards and compiled a scrapbook of the Crimean War that contains a rare photograph of Mary Seacole.

His 16th son, Reverend William Pitt Wigram, was the grandfather of Clive Wigram, 1st Baron Wigram. Another descendant was Ralph Wigram, grandson of Joseph Cotton Wigram.

== Arms ==
Coat of arms of Sir Robert Wigram, 1st Baronet

Notes
Granted 20 July 1807 by Sir Chichester Fortescue, Ulster King of Arms
Crest
On a mount Vert a hand in armour in fess couped at the wrist Proper charged with an escallop and holding a fleur-de-lis erect Or.
Escutcheon
Argent on a pale Gules three escallops Or over all a chevron engrailed counterchanged and on a chief waves of the sea thereon a ship representing an English vessel of war of the sixteenth century with four masts sails furled Proper colours flying Gules.
Motto
Dulcis Amor Patriae

Parliament of the United Kingdom
Preceded by Reginald Pole-Carew; Edward Golding	Member of Parliament for Fowey; 1802–1806; With: Reginald Pole Carew	Succeeded by Reginald Pole-Carew; Robert Wigram (junior)
Preceded by Richard Nevill	Member of Parliament for Wexford; 1806–1807	Succeeded by Richard Nevill
Baronetage of the United Kingdom
New creation	Baronet (of Walthamstow); 1805–1830	Succeeded by Robert Wigram
