= Dalrymple-White baronets =

Baronetcy in the Baronetage of the United Kingdom

The Dalrymple-White Baronetcy, of High Mark in the County of Wigtown, was a title in the Baronetage of the United Kingdom. It was created on 28 July 1926 for the soldier and Conservative politician Godfrey Dalrymple-White. In 2025 the title became extinct, having been held last by his grandson, the third Baronet, who succeeded his father in 2006.

Sir Henry Dalrymple White (1820–1886), father of the first Baronet, was a general in the Army and commanded the 6th (Inniskilling) Dragoons during the Crimean War. Sir John Chambers White (died 1845), grandfather of the first Baronet, was a vice-admiral in the Royal Navy. He married Charlotte Elizabeth, daughter of General Sir Hew Whiteford Dalrymple, 1st Baronet (see Dalrymple baronets).

== Dalrymple-White baronets, of High Mark (1926) ==
- Sir Godfrey Dalrymple Dalrymple-White, 1st Baronet (1866–1954)
- Wing Commander Sir Henry Arthur Dalrymple Dalrymple-White, 2nd Baronet (1917–2006)
- Sir Jan Hew Dalrymple-White, 3rd Baronet (1950–2025)

The title is now extinct as there was no heir to the baronetcy upon the 3rd Baronet's death. His son, Gregory Dalrymple-White, was born illegitimately, and thus the title cannot be passed on.

== See also ==
- Dalrymple baronets
- Dalrymple-Hay baronets
- Dalrymple-Champneys baronets
