= Lansing (name) =

Lansing is a Dutch patronymic surname from the personal name Lans (Germanic Lanzo). The "-ing" or "-ink" suffix originally was patronymic, but later also became indicative of a place. Lansing is now a rare name in the Netherlands (Lansink is the more common form), but there are many descendants in the United States of Gerrit Gerritse Lansing (ca.1615–bef.1654), a baker in Hasselt, Overijssel, whose widow and children migrated to New Netherland in 1654. At a later time there the surname became used as a middle name and given name. Notable people with the name include:

== Surname ==
- Abraham Lansing (1835–1899), New York lawyer and politician
- Abraham G. Lansing (1756–1834), New York politician
- Alfred Lansing (1921–1975), American journalist and writer
- Ambrose Lansing (1891–1959), American Egyptologist and anthropologist
- Bradford R. Lansing (1860–1912), New York politician
- Clarabelle Lansing (1930–1988), American flight attendant, sole fatality of the Aloha Airlines Flight 243 disaster
- Frederick Lansing (1838–1894), U.S. Representative from New York
- Gene Lansing (1898–1945), American baseball pitcher
- Gerrit Y. Lansing (1783–1862), U.S. Representative from New York
- Greg Lansing (born 1967), American college basketball coach
- Isaac J. Lansing (1846–1920), American pastor and university president
- J. Stephen Lansing (born 1950), American anthropologist and complexity scientist
- Jacob John Lansing, American sheriff
- James Bullough Lansing (1902–1949), American audio engineer
  - Founder of the companies Altec Lansing and JBL
- Jewel Lansing (born 1930), American (Oregon) writer and politician
- Jim Lansing (1919–2000), American college football player and coach
- John Lansing Jr. (1754–1829), New York lawyer and politician
  - Named for him: Lansing, New York and, indirectly, Lansing, Michigan
- Joi Lansing (1929–1972), American model, actress and nightclub singer
- Marjorie Lansing (1916–1998), American political scientist and feminist
- Michael Lansing (born 1994), American soccer goalkeeper
- Mike Lansing (born 1968), American baseball second baseman
- P. J. Lansing (born 1949), American model
- Robert Lansing (1864–1928), United States Secretary of State (1915–1920)
  - Named for him: the Lansing–Ishii Agreement and U.S. Navy cargo ship SS Robert Lansing
- Robert Lansing (actor) (1928–1994), American stage, film and television actor
- Robert Lansing (state senator) (1799–1878), New York lawyer and politician
- Sherry Lansing (born 1944), American actress and first woman to head a Hollywood studio
- William E. Lansing (1821–1883), U.S. Representative from New York
- William Henry Lansing (1914–1942), U.S. Navy casualty of World War II

=== Fictional characters ===
- Lansing family, family of doctors in the General Hospital soap opera, including Ric Lansing and Molly Lansing
- Laura Lansing, eponymous character of the 1988 comedy film Laura Lansing Slept Here
- Leona Lansing, supporting character of the political drama, The Newsroom (2012–2014).

== Given name ==
- Lansing Hoskins Beach (1860–1945), U.S. Army Chief of Engineers
- Lansing Bennett (1926–1993), American physician and shooting victim at the CIA Headquarters
- Lansing Brown Jr. (1900–1962), American photographer
- Lansing Campbell (1882–1937), American illustrator
- Lansing C. Holden (1858–1930), American architect
- Lansing Colton Holden Jr. (1896–1938), American World War I flying ace
- Lansing Hotaling (1839–1909), American lawyer and politician
- Lansing Lamont (1930–2013), American journalist
- Lansing Leroy Mitchell (1914–2001), United States federal judge
- Lansing B. Mizner (1825–1893), American lawyer, diplomat, and politician
- Lansing Stout (1828–1871), American politician and lawyer, U.S. Representative for Oregon

== Middle name ==
- Richard Lansing Conolly (1892–1962), United States Navy Admiral
- Frederic Lansing Day (1890–1981), American playwright
- Eleanor Lansing Dulles (1895–1996), American economist and U.S. Department of State official
- Leroy Lansing Janes (1838–1909), American educator in Japan
- Thomas Lansing Masson (1866–1934), American anthropologist, editor and author
- Stuart Douglas Lansing Paine (1910–1961), American Antarctic explorer
- John Van Schaick Lansing Pruyn (1811–1877), U.S. Representative from New York
- George Lansing Raymond (1839–1929), American philosopher

== See also ==
- Lensing, surname
- Jos Lansink (born 1961), Dutch equestrian
- Leonard Lansink (born 1956), German actor
