= Archibald Bruce =

Archibald Bruce may refer to:

- Archibald Bruce (writer) (1746–1816), Scottish theological writer
- Archibald Bruce (mineralogist) (1777–1818), American physician and mineralogist
