= Willoughby Moore =

British army officer

Lieutenant Colonel Willoughby Moore (1798 – 31 May 1854) was a British Army cavalry officer who died at sea on his way to the Crimean War, his unit (the 6th (Inniskilling) Dragoons) was part of the British cavalry's Heavy Brigade.

Moore was born in Long Melford, in Suffolk in 1798. His baptismal records notes his father as Richard and his mother as Sidney Arabella (née Cotton). They lived at the Moore's family home in Long Melford, i.e. Kentwell Hall.

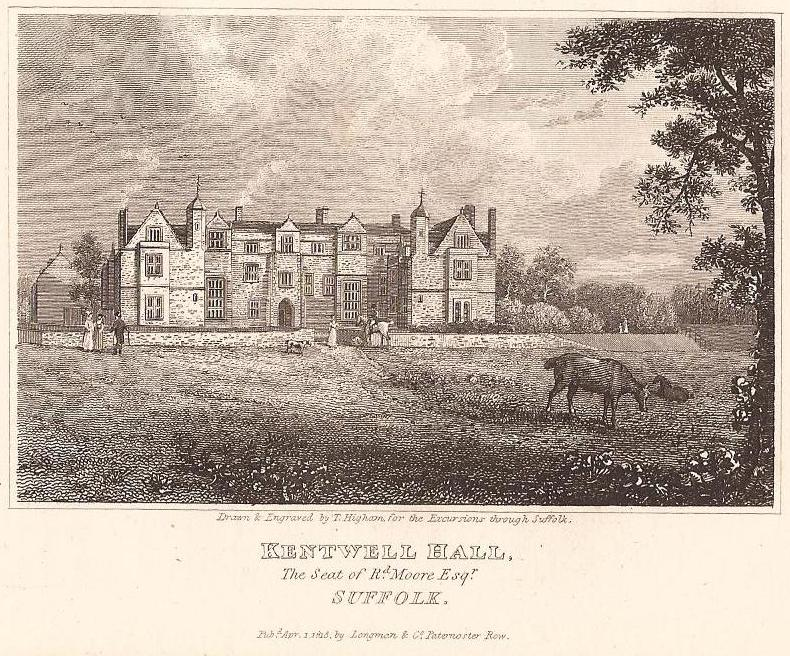
Kentwell Hall in 1818 by landscape engraver Thomas Higham, during Richard Moore's occupancy

Theirs was not a happy marriage and Richard Moore divorced his wife in 1812, on discovering her infidelity with a younger estate steward. Unfortunately Richard Moore managed to loose his ancestral home and estate (Kentwell Hall) and ended up dying in a debtors' prison in 1826.

Fortunately Willoughby Moore had the funds to purchase a commission as a cornet in the 6th (Inniskilling) Dragoons on 7 September 1820; and he rose steadily through the ranks. He was on his way to the Crimean War with his regiment; he was the regiment's commanding officer, when the ship he was sailing in (the Europa) caught fire and sank off the Portuguese coast. Eighteen members of the regiment and military wife were lost at sea (including Lieutenant Colonel Moore), along with seaman and other passengers. Two memorials to the tragedy exist, one in the Royal Hospital Chelsea the other in York Minster.

He married Charlotte Anne Eliza Clarke, in Leatherhead, Surrey, on 8 December 1824.

After her husband's death Charlotte Moore volunteered to nurse soldiers at the Scutari military hospital (located in Selimiye Barracks) in what was then Constantinople, now Istanbul. She was appointed as a lead nurse on 26 June 1855 at the Pera Palace Hospital, but subsequently dies of Dysentery on 22 November 1855 at the same hospital. She was buried in the Haidar Pasa Cemetery and her headstone is still present.

Both husband and wife gave their lives in the course of Britain's Crimean Campaign.
