= Henry Munro =

Henry Munro may refer to:

- Henry Munro (Canada West politician) (1802–1874), farmer and political figure in Canada West

- Henry Munro Middle School, Ottawa, Canada, named after the above

- Henry M. Munro (1840–1915), farmer and political figure in Nova Scotia, Canada
- Henry Munro (United Irishman) (1758–1798)
- Henry Munro (loyalist) (1730–1801), British Army chaplain and missionary to the Mohawk people

== See also ==
- Henry Munroe (c. 1727–c. 1782), Scottish-born soldier and political figure in Nova Scotia
- Henry Smith Munroe (1850–1933), American geologist
- Sir Harry Munro, 7th Baronet (1720–1781)
- Henry Monro (1791–1814), British painter
- Henry Monroe (born 1956), defensive back in the National Football League
- Henry Munro-Butler-Johnstone (1837–1902), British author and politician
- Harry Monroe, a fictional character in My Name is Earl
