= Sir John Hayes, 1st Baronet =

Sir John Macnamara Hayes, 1st Baronet (c. 1750 – 19 July 1809) was a military physician who served as physician-extraordinary to George, Prince of Wales, the future George IV of the United Kingdom.

== Early life ==
Hayes was born in Limerick, Ireland. He was a son of John Hayes and Margaret (née Macnamara) Hayes. His grandfather, Daniel Hayes, of Mayvore, was a captain in the army at the Battle of the Boyne in the Nine Years' War.

He became a doctor of medicine of Rheims on 20 March 1784 before being admitted a Licentiate of the College of Physicians on 26 June 1786.

== Career ==
He was a British Army surgeon in the US from 1775 to 1783. In the 1790s, he served in the army in the French Revolutionary Wars. In 1784, Hayes was appointed physician-extraordinary to the George, Prince of Wales, the future George IV of the United Kingdom. He was also a physician at the Westminster Hospital from 1792 to 1794.

For his medical service, he was awarded a baronetcy in 1797. In 1806, Hayes was appointed inspector-general of the ordnance medical department at Woolwich. This lasted until his death in 1809.

== Personal life ==
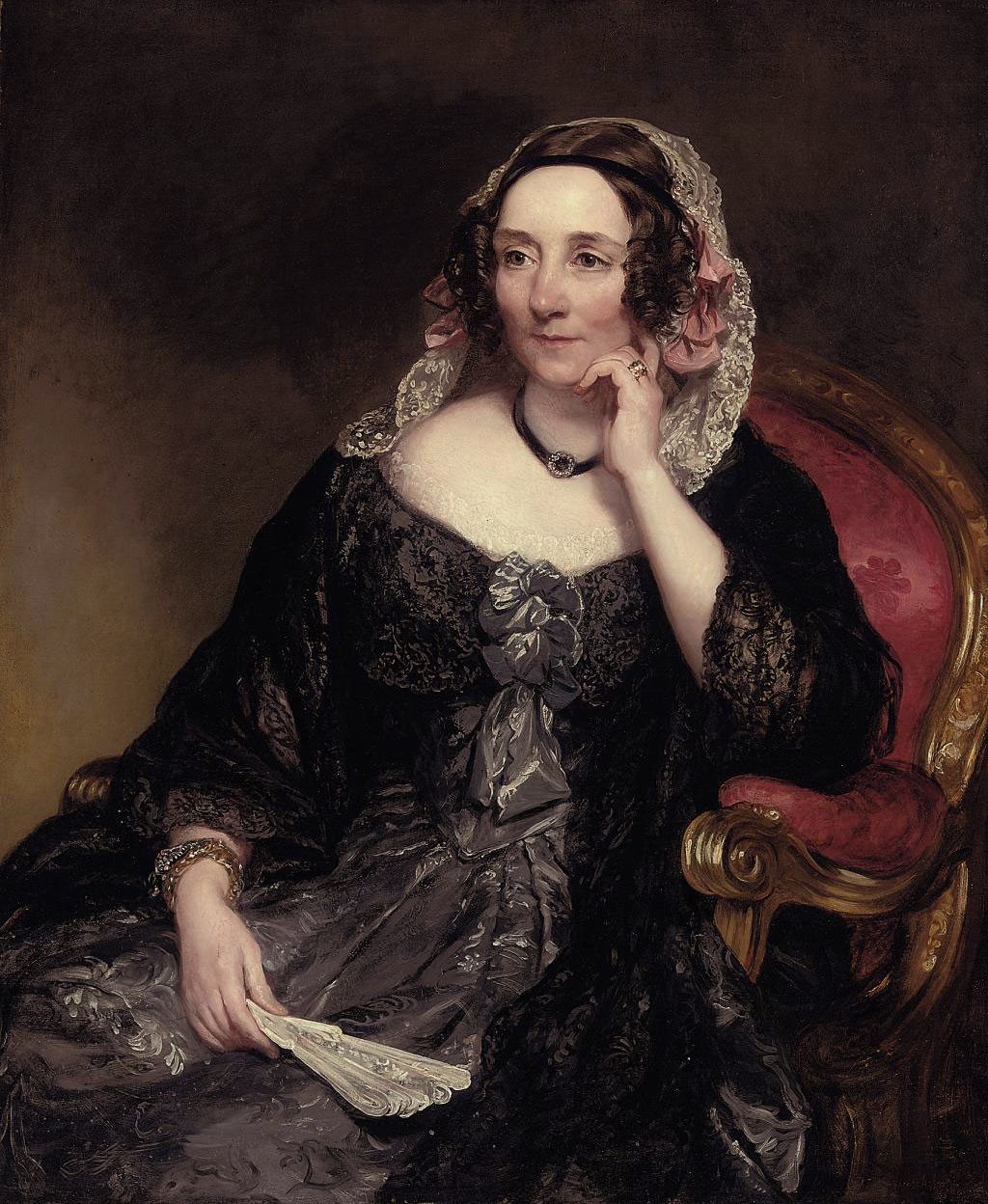
His daughter, Selina, Lady Fitzwygram

On 1 May 1787, Hayes was married to Anne White, the eldest daughter of wealthy New York City merchant Henry White and his wife Eve (née Van Cortlandt) White (a daughter of Frederick Van Cortlandt). Anne was a sister of Vice-Admiral Sir John Chambers White, General Frederick Van Cortlandt White, Henry White Jr. (husband of their cousin, Anna Van Cortlandt), Frances White (wife of Dr. Archibald Bruce), and Margaret White (wife of Peter Jay Munro). Together, Anne and John were the parents of:

- Sir Thomas Pelham Hayes, 2nd Baronet (1794–1851), who married Caroline Emma (née Stoughton) Dickson, a daughter of Thomas Stoughton and widow of Lt.-Col. Hill Dickson, in 1840.
- Sir John Warren Hayes, 3rd Baronet (1799–1896), who married Ellen Beauchamp, a daughter of George Edward Beauchamp (brother of Sir William Beauchamp-Proctor, 3rd Baronet) in 1844.
- Anna-Maria Hayes, who married the Rev. Thomas Robertson, senior chaplain at Calcutta, in 1824.
- Selina Hayes, who married Sir Robert Fitzwygram, 2nd Baronet
- Margaret Augusta Hayes (1797-1803).

Sir John died in Camden from acute laryngitis on 19 July 1809 and was buried at St. James's, Piccadilly. He was succeeded in the baronetcy by his son Thomas. After his death in 1851, he was succeeded by his brother John, who lived at Arborfield Hall. Upon John's death in 1896, the baronetcy became extinct.

Baronetage of Great Britain
New creation	Baronet (of Westminster); 1797–1809	Succeeded by Thomas Pelham Hayes
