= Frederick Van Cortlandt White =

British officer of the British Army

General Frederick Van Cortlandt White (1767–1859) was a British officer of the British Army in the Grenadier Guards.

== Early life ==
White was born in New York City in 1767. He was one of thirteen children (of whom seven reached adulthood) born to Eva (Van Cortlandt) White (1737–1836) and wealthy New York City merchant Henry White (1732–1786). Among his siblings were Vice-Admiral Sir John Chambers White, Henry White Jr. (husband of their cousin, Anna Van Cortlandt), Anne White (wife of Sir John Hayes, 1st Baronet), Frances White (wife of Dr. Archibald Bruce), and Margaret White (wife of Peter Jay Munro). His father was a member of the New York City Council and president of the New York Chamber of Commerce from 1772 to 1773. The Whites were ardent Loyalists during the American Revolutionary War, and in 1783 the family abandoned their home in New York and moved to London.

His maternal grandparents were Frederick Van Cortlandt and Frances (née Jay) Van Cortlandt. Among his extended family was uncle Augustus Van Cortlandt.

== Career ==
He entered the British Army in 1781 as an ensign. He was later promoted to Major-General of the Grenadier Guards, before becoming General.

== Personal life ==
White was twice married, first to Sophia Heaton Coore of Hendon, Middlesex in 1802. Together, they were the parents of: John Coore White, Margaret Lechmere White, and Eve White.

After her death, he married Miss Davidson. General White died in 1859.
