= Russ Columbo =

American singer, violinist, and actor (1908–1934)

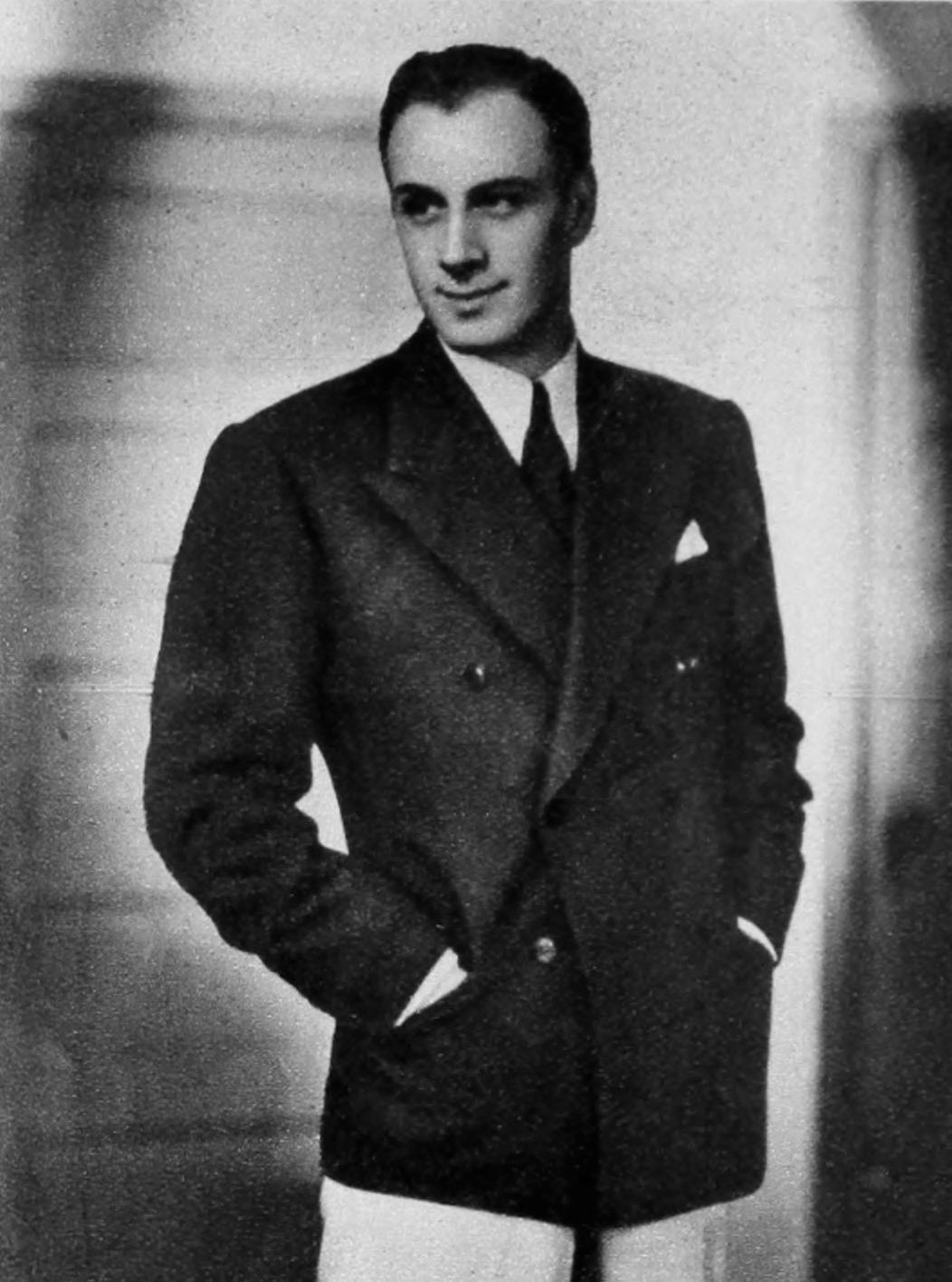

Background information
- Born: Ruggiero Eugenio di Rodolfo Colombo; January 14, 1908; Camden, New Jersey, U.S.
- Died: September 2, 1934 (aged 26) Los Angeles, California, U.S.
- Genres: Jazz, popular music
- Occupations: Actor, singer, violinist
- Instruments: Violin, baritone voice
- Years active: 1928–1934

Ruggiero Eugenio di Rodolfo Colombo (January 14, 1908 – September 2, 1934), known as Russ Columbo, was an American baritone, songwriter, violinist, and actor. He is famous for romantic ballads such as his signature tune "You Call It Madness, But I Call It Love" and his own compositions "Prisoner of Love" and "Too Beautiful for Words".

== Early life ==
Columbo was born in Camden, New Jersey, and raised in Calistoga, California, the 12th and last child of Italian immigrant parents Nicola and Giulia "Julia" Colombo. He attended Everett Grammar School and started playing the violin at a very young age, debuting professionally at the age of 13. His family moved to Los Angeles when he was 16, and he attended Belmont High School there. He left high school at age 17 to study violin under Calmon Luboviski and travel with various bands around the country. He sang and played violin in numerous nightclubs.

== Career ==
=== Films ===
By 1928, at the age of 20, Columbo began to participate in motion pictures, including a Vitaphone short in which Columbo appeared as a member of Gus Arnheim and His Orchestra. Eventually, he obtained some feature work in front of the camera, but he slowed down his activities in cinema to pursue other interests. At the time of his death, Columbo had just completed work on the film Wake Up and Dream; he was on his way to stardom when his life was cut short. Among Columbo's other films are: Woman to Woman (with Betty Compton), Wolf Song (with Lupe Vélez), The Texan (with Gary Cooper), and Broadway Thru a Keyhole.

=== Musician ===
Columbo performed seven vocals while with Arnheim as a member of the string section, six for Okeh Records and only one for Victor ("A Peach of a Pair") on June 18, 1930, a few months before Bing Crosby joined the band along with Al Rinker and Harry Barris as "The Rhythm Boys".

Columbo ran a nightclub for a while, the Club Pyramid, but gave it up when his manager told him he had star potential. In 1931, he traveled to New York City with his manager, songwriter Con Conrad, who secured a late-night radio slot with NBC. This led to numerous engagements, a recording contract with RCA Victor records, and tremendous popularity with legions of mostly female fans. Not long after arriving in New York, Columbo met actress Dorothy Dell at an audition for the Ziegfeld Follies and began seeing her. Conrad did his best to break the relationship up with a series of publicity-created "ruse romances" involving Columbo and actresses such as Greta Garbo and Pola Negri; it succeeded. (Dorothy Dell died in an auto accident in June 1934—just months before Columbo's own fatal accident.)

The type of singing that was popularized by the likes of Columbo, Rudy Vallee, and Bing Crosby is called crooning. Columbo disliked the label, but it caught on with the general public. It gained popular credence, despite its initial use as a term of derision for the singers employing their low, soothing voices in romantic songs. Similarly, to reinforce his romantic appeal, he was called "Radio's Valentino".

Columbo composed the songs "Prisoner of Love" and "You Call It Madness (But I Call It Love)" with Con Conrad, Gladys Du Bois, and Paul Gregory; "Too Beautiful For Words", recorded by the Teddy Joyce Orchestra in 1935; "When You're in Love", "My Love", and "Let's Pretend There's a Moon", recorded by Fats Waller and Tab Hunter; and "Hello Sister". "Prisoner of Love" is a standard that has been recorded by Frank Sinatra, Jo Stafford, Art Tatum, Perry Como, the Ink Spots, Mildred Bailey, Tiny Tim, Teddy Wilson with Lena Horne on vocals, Bing Crosby, Billy Eckstine, and James Brown. Perry Como had a number-one hit on Billboard with his recording. James Brown had a top-20 pop hit and performed the song on The Ed Sullivan Show and in the concert movie The T.A.M.I. Show (1964).

== Death ==
On Sunday, September 2, 1934, Columbo was shot under peculiar circumstances by a longtime friend, photographer Lansing Brown Jr., while Columbo was visiting him at home. Brown had a collection of firearms, and the two men were examining various pieces. Quoting Brown's description of the accident:

I was absent-mindedly fooling around with one of the guns. It was of a dueling design and works with a cap and trigger. I was pulling back the trigger and clicking it time after time. I had a match in my hand and when I clicked, apparently the match caught in between the hammer and the firing pin. There was an explosion. Russ slid to the side of his chair.

The ball ricocheted off a nearby table and hit Columbo above the left eye. Surgeons at Good Samaritan Hospital made an unsuccessful attempt to remove the ball from Columbo's brain; he died less than six hours after the shooting. Columbo's death was ruled an accident and Brown was exonerated from blame. His funeral Mass was attended by numerous Hollywood actors, including Bing Crosby and Carole Lombard, who was to have had dinner with Columbo the evening of the accident and who was romantically involved with him.

Columbo's mother was hospitalized in serious condition from a heart attack at the time of the accident; the news was withheld from her by his brothers and sisters for the remaining 10 years of her life. Owing to her previous heart condition, it was feared that the news would prove fatal to her. They used all manner of subterfuge to give the impression that Columbo was still alive, including faked letters from him and records used to simulate his radio program.

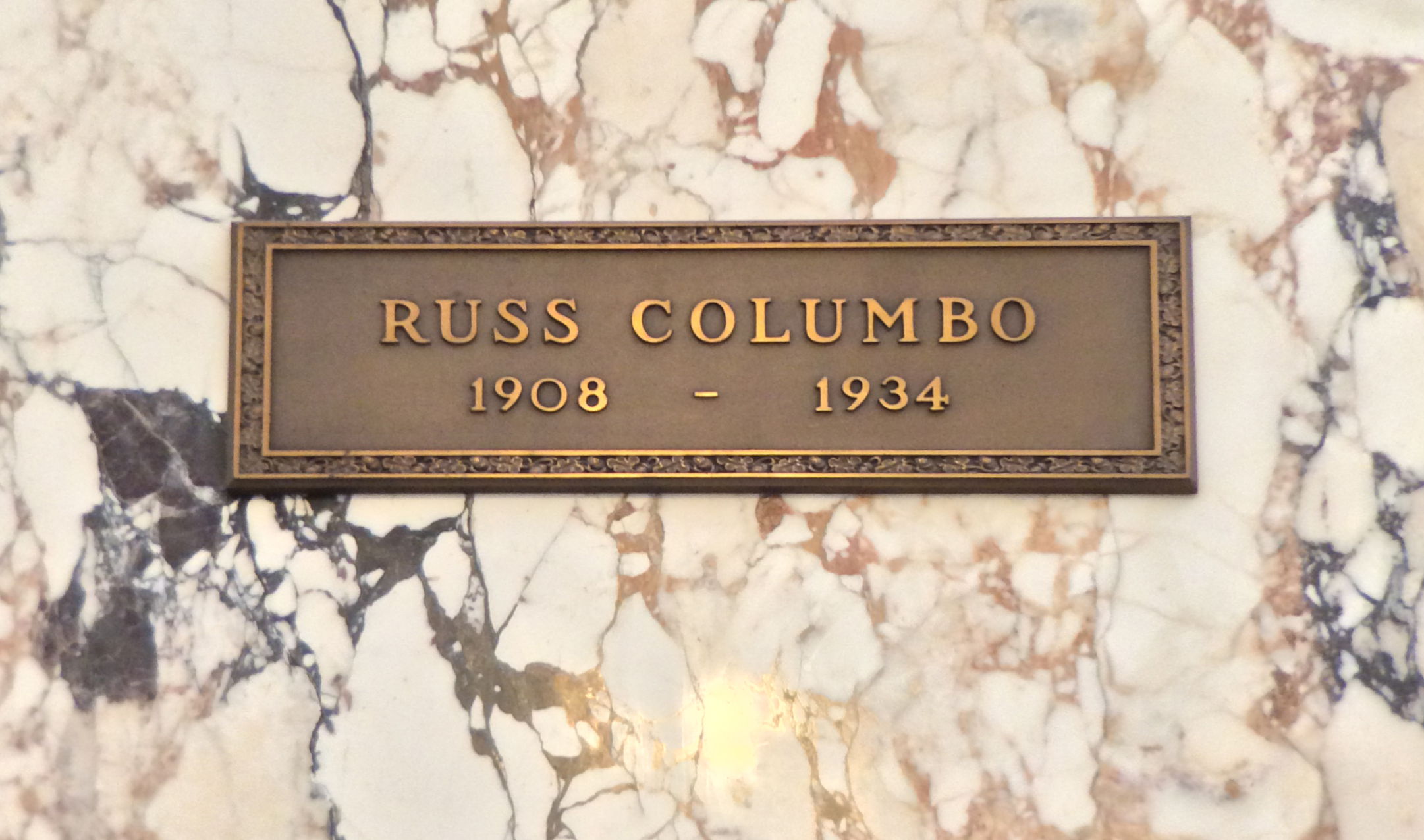
Crypt of Russ Columbo in the Great Mausoleum at Forest Lawn Glendale

Columbo is interred in Forest Lawn Memorial Park in Glendale, California.

Actress Virginia Brissac was serving as Columbo's private secretary at the time of his death and was later called upon by the Los Angeles County Coroner's Office to testify and identify Columbo's remains at the subsequent inquest.

== In popular culture ==
- In 1958, singer Jerry Vale recorded a tribute album titled I Remember Russ.
- In 1961 Columbo is referenced in the television show "My Three Sons" Episode "Trial by Separation" (Season 1, Episode 34) when Teenager Mike Douglas (Tim Considine) asks his grandfather, Bub (William Frawley) "What is love?" Bub suggest that Mike could find the answer in old romantic songs from his era and then begins singing Columbo's "Prisoner of Love" and says "Russ Columbo- there was a fellow who knew how to sing about love. Well, he'd tear your heart out. but there aren't any more Russ Columbos anymore." He humorously sings the song several different times throughout the episode and the show ends with Bub doing the dishes singing "Prisoner of Love " with the family dog outside the window howling "
- In 1995, 61 years after Columbo's death, singer Tiny Tim released an album titled Prisoner of Love (A Tribute to Russ Columbo), which he recorded with the group Clang.
- Columbo is one of the historical figures named in the Neil Diamond composition "Done Too Soon".
- Columbo is one of the three famous crooners named in the 1932 Looney Tunes cartoon Crosby, Columbo, and Vallee.
- Crooner Andy Russell's artistic name was adapted from Columbo's first name.
- In JoJo's Bizarre Adventure, "Prisoner of Love" is the title of both a Stone Ocean chapter and one of the entire JoJo's manga volumes.
