= John Chambers White =

British Royal Navy officer

Vice-Admiral Sir John Chambers White KCB
- Born: c. 1770; New York City
- Died: 2 April 1845 (aged 74–75); Sheerness, Kent
- Military career
- Allegiance: United Kingdom
- Branch: Royal Navy
- Service years: 1783 to 1845
- Rank: Royal Navy Vice-Admiral
- Commands: Nore Command
- Conflicts: French Revolutionary War; Action of 16 July 1797; Napoleonic Wars; Action of 13 March 1806
- Awards: Knight Commander of the Order of the Bath

Vice-Admiral Sir John Chambers White, KCB (c. 1770 – 2 April 1845) was a British Royal Navy officer of the early nineteenth century, who participated in a number of engagements during the Napoleonic Wars. He achieved most of his fame in the late 1790s as the commander of HMS Sylph, a small brig operating in Northern European waters. White was able to capture a number of equivalent French, Spanish and Dutch vessels and on one occasion was instrumental in the destruction of a much larger French frigate by a British squadron. In 1798 he was with the squadron that discovered the French invasion attempt on Ireland and acted as a messenger in the campaign to destroy the invasion force that ended at the Battle of Tory Island. He was later flag captain for Sir John Borlase Warren and participated at the action of 13 March 1806 and the destruction of the Regulus in 1814. After the war, White largely retired, but retained several shore appointments and rose to the rank of vice-admiral.

== Early life ==
White was born in approximately 1770, the son of wealthy New York City merchant Henry White and his wife Eve (Van Cortlandt) White (a daughter of Frederick Van Cortlandt). Among his siblings were General Frederick Van Cortlandt White, Henry White Jr. (husband of their cousin, Anna Van Cortlandt), Anne White (wife of Sir John Hayes, 1st Baronet), Frances White (wife of Dr. Archibald Bruce), and Margaret White (wife of Peter Jay Munro). His father was a member of the New York City Council and President of the New York Chamber of Commerce in 1772–73. The Whites were ardent Loyalists during the American Revolutionary War, and in 1783 the family abandoned their home in New York and moved to London. John White joined the Royal Navy soon afterwards.

== Career ==
In 1790 he was promoted to lieutenant and served in the French Revolutionary Wars, becoming commander of the brig Sylph in 1795.

Sylph was a highly successful cruiser in home waters. At the action of 12 May 1796 she captured the Dutch brig Mercury. Then in 1796 she captured the French privateer Phoenix. Sylph assisted Anson in the destruction of the French corvette Calliope at the action of 16 July 1797. Together, they drove Calliope on shore, where Sylph proceeded to fire on her. When Pomone checked a week later, Calliope was wrecked; her crew were camped on shore trying to salvage what stores they could. Pomone confirmed that the flute Freedom and a brig that Anson and Sylph had also driven ashore too were wrecked. In August, Sylph attacked Sable d'Olonne. In 1798, White seized six French, Spanish and American ships in the Bay of Biscay, and during October participated in the opening stages of the Battle of Tory Island. In 1799, White was rewarded with promotion to post captain and was given command of the ship of the line HMS Renown, flagship of his former squadron commander Sir John Borlase Warren. Renown served in the Mediterranean, and in 1801 engaged the defences of Porto Ferrajo.

In 1803, Renown was attached to the blockade of Toulon, and the following year Warren and White were transferred to the ship of the line HMS Foudroyant in Britain, later assigned to find and defeat the French squadrons in the Atlantic during the Atlantic campaign of 1806. These squadrons could not be found, but Foudroyant was engaged at the successful Action of 13 March 1806, when a separate French squadron was defeated and captured. In 1810, White took command of the first rate HMS Hibernia under Admiral Sir Samuel Hood, sailing for the Mediterranean, where he took command of HMS Centaur off Toulon. In 1811 he assisted the Spanish defenders at the first Siege of Tarragona and subsequently involved in the destruction of the Regulus in 1814.

=== Later life ===
After the war, White left active service but continued to advance in rank, becoming a rear-admiral in 1830 and a Knight Commander of the Order of the Bath in 1841, by which time he was a vice-admiral. He served as superintendent of Woolwich Dockyard and in January 1844 was made Commander-in-Chief, The Nore, dying suddenly the following year.

== Personal life ==
White was twice married. His first marriage was to Cordelia Fanshawe (d. 1809), a daughter of Christiana (née Gennys) Fanshawe and Capt. Robert Fanshawe (a son of Rear-Admiral Charles Fanshawe).

After his first wife's death in 1809, he married Charlotte Elizabeth Dalrymple, the daughter of Lt.-Gen. Sir Hew Whiteford Dalrymple, 1st Baronet and Frances Leighton (a daughter of Gen. Francis Leighton). Together, they were the parents of:

- General Sir Henry Dalrymple White (1820–1886), who married Louisa Mary Smith, daughter of Martin Tucker Smith, in 1858. After her death, he married Alice Elizabeth Malcolm, daughter of Neil Malcolm, 13th of Poltalloch, in 1863.

Sir John died on 2 April 1845 at Sheerness, Kent. He was survived by his second wife and their son.

=== Descendants ===
Through his son's second marriage, he was posthumously a grandfather to Sir Godfrey Dalrymple-White, 1st Baronet, who married Hon. Catherine Mary Cary (a daughter of Byron Cary, 12th Viscount Falkland).

== See also ==
- O'Byrne, William Richard (1849). "White, John Chambers" . A Naval Biographical Dictionary . John Murray – via Wikisource.

== Notes ==
Military offices
Preceded by Sir Edward Brace	Commander-in-Chief, The Nore; 1844–1845	Succeeded by Sir Edward Durnford King
