= Van Cortlandt family =

New York political family of Dutch origin

Van Cortlandt
- Coat of arms of Olav Van Cortlandt
- Current region: New York
- Origin: Netherlands
- Connected families: Van Rensselaer family; Schuyler family; Livingston family

The Van Cortlandt family was an influential political dynasty from the seventeenth-century Dutch origins of New York through its period as an English colony, then after it became a state, and into the nineteenth century. It rose to great prominence with the award of a Royal Charter to Van Cortlandt Manor, an 86,000-acre (35,000 ha) tract in today's Westchester County sprawling from the Hudson River to the Connecticut state line granted as a Patent to Stephanus Van Cortlandt in 1697 by King William III.

Among the Van Cortlandt family tree are members of the Philipse family, van Rensselaer family, Schuyler family, Livingston family, the de Peyster family, the Gage family, the Jay family (including John Jay, the Founding Father and first Chief Justice of the Supreme Court), and the Delanceys.

Its legacy includes Van Cortlandt Park and the Van Cortlandt House Museum in the Bronx, New York; the town of Cortlandt in northern Westchester County, New York; Van Cortlandt Upper Manor House in the hamlet of Cortlandt Manor, New York; Van Cortlandt Manor in the village of Croton-on-Hudson to its south; and the namesake for Cortland County, New York and the State University of New York College at Cortland.

== History ==
Captain Olof Stevense or Stevenszen (he originally used this patronymic, "son of Steven," as his name), who was born in Wijk bij Duurstede, Netherlands, arrived in New Amsterdam in 1637. Initially, he was a soldier and bookkeeper who rose to high colonial ranks in service of the Dutch West India Company, serving many terms as burgomaster and alderman. As he prospered in business and rose in society, he adopted the formal surname, "Van Cortlandt," meaning "from Courtland" or "short land" (kort land) in Dutch, likely denoting a specific place or estate of his birth. His descendants became involved in politics and married into the leading political families of colonial America, including the Van Rensselaers, Schuylers, and Livingstons.

Van Cortlandt Park in the Bronx, New York, derives its name from the family, as well as Manhattan's Cortlandt Street and Cortlandt Alley. The town of Cortlandt to the north, in Westchester County, New York, carries the family name as well. The Van Cortlandt House Museum in the Bronx is on the National Register of Historic Places. The Van Cortlandt Manor house in Westchester is a National Historic Landmark.

== Family tree ==
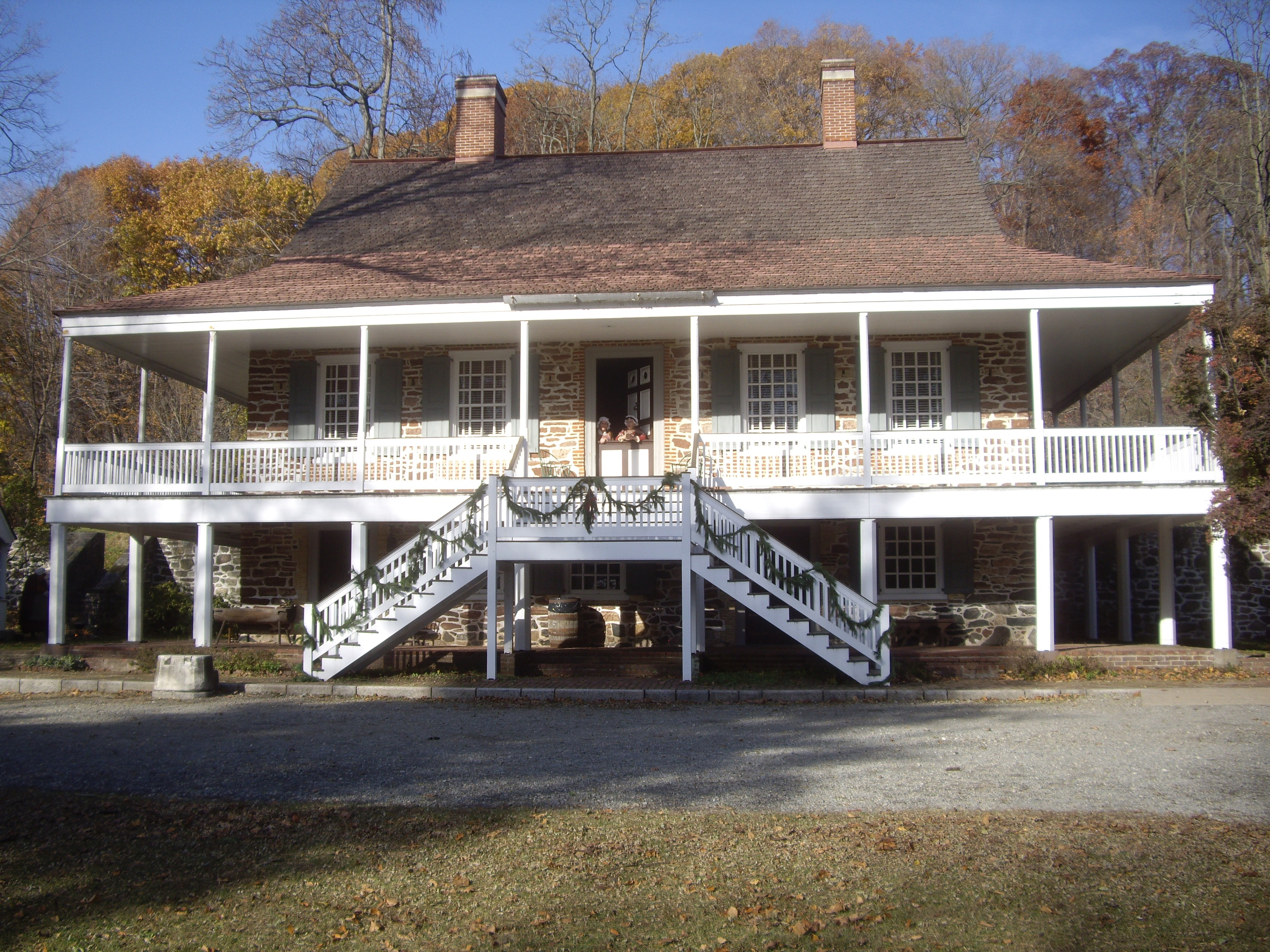
Van Cortlandt Manor, Croton-on-Hudson, New York

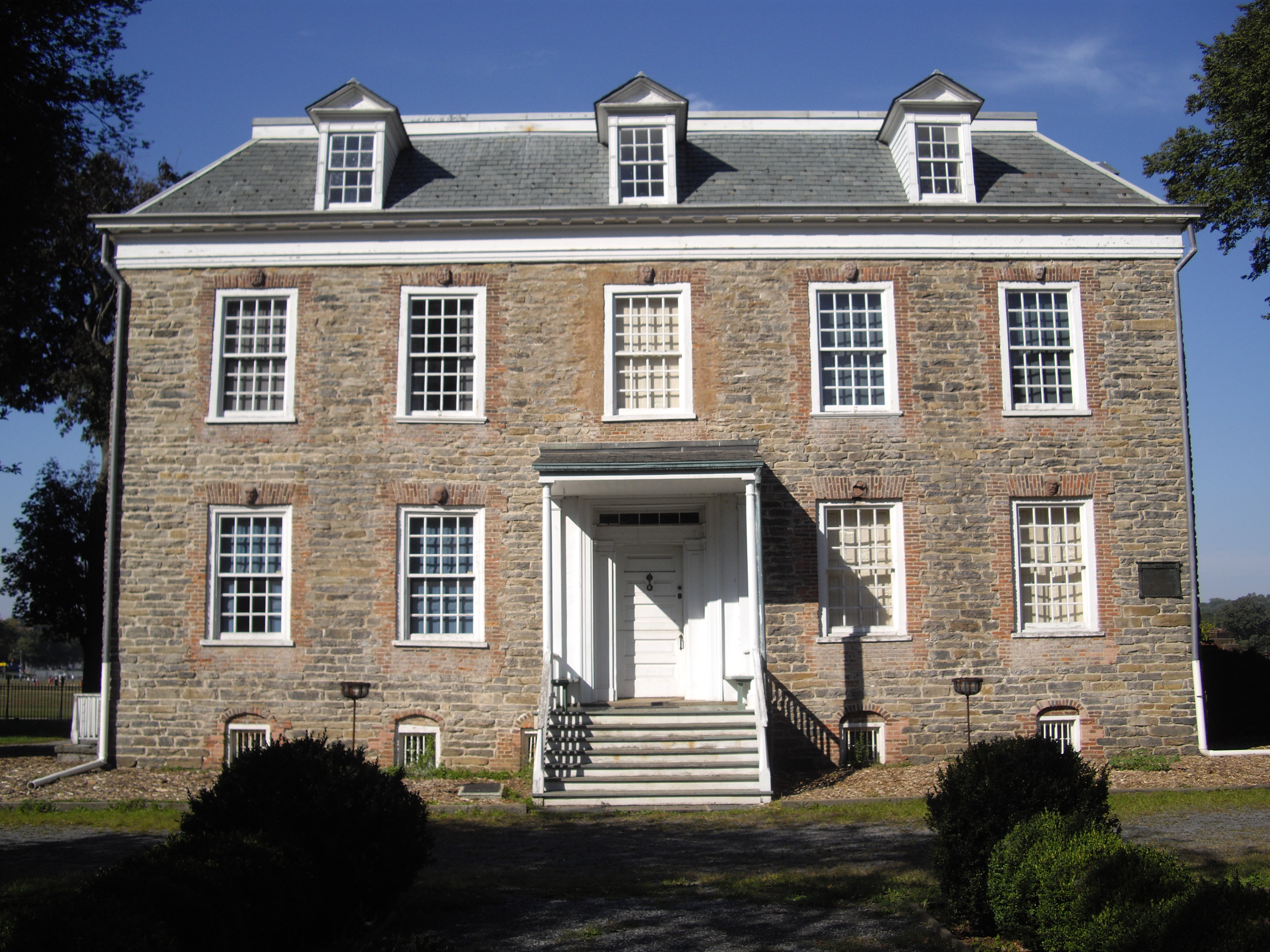
Van Cortlandt House Museum, in the Bronx, New York City

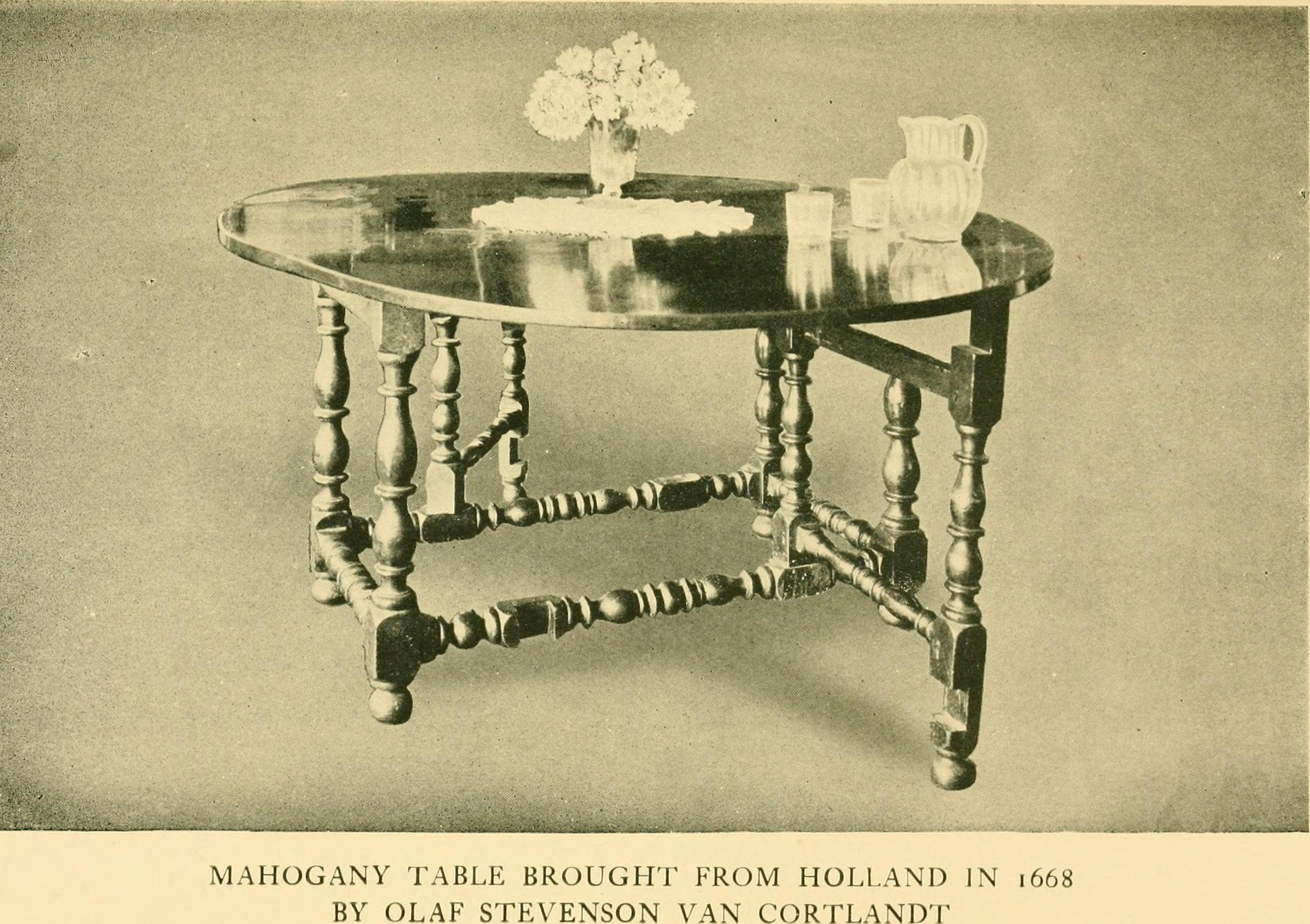
Mahogany table brought from Holland in 1668 by Olof Stevense Van Cortlandt

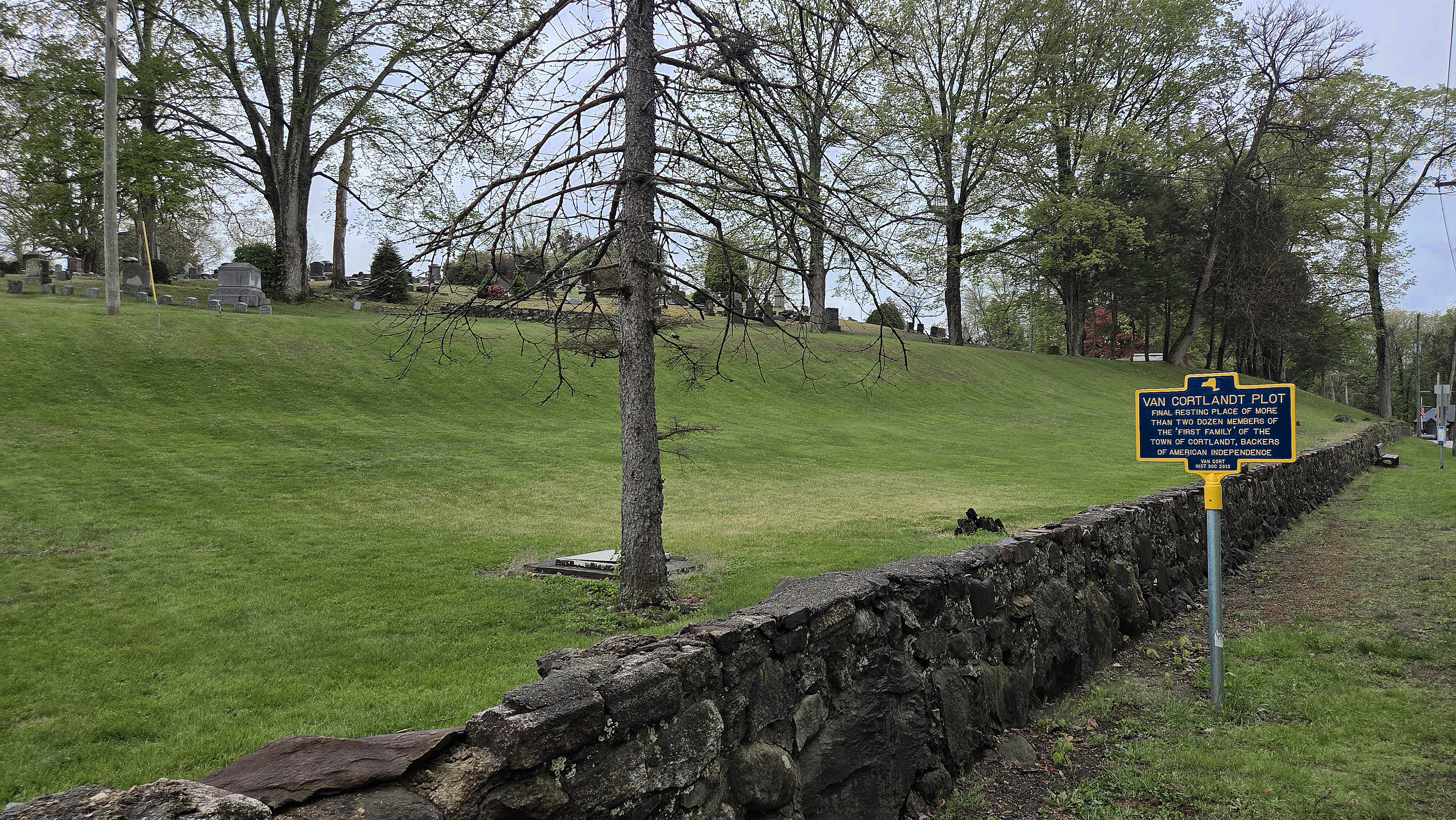
Pierre Van Cortlandt family plot in Hillside Cemetery, Cortlandt, NY

- Steven Van Cortlandt
  - Olof Stevense Van Cortlandt (c. 1615–1684) m. Annetje Loockermans (1618-1684).
    - Stephanus Van Cortlandt (1643-1700) m. Gertrude Schuyler (born 1654)
      - Margaretta Van Cortlandt (b. 1674) m. Judge Samuel Bayard (b. 1669) (son of Nicholas Bayard)
        - Gertrude Bayard m. Peter Kemble (1704-1789)
          - Margaret Kemble (1734–1824) m. British General Thomas Gage (1718/19–1787); descendants in the United Kingdom include the Bertie family, the Gage family, and the Foley family.
      - Anne Van Cortlandt (1676-1724) m. Stephen DeLancey (1663–1741)
        - James DeLancey (1703–1760) m. Anne Heathcote
        - Susannah DeLancey (1707–1771) m. Vice-Admiral Sir Peter Warren (1703–1752)
        - Oliver DeLancey Sr. (1718-1785) m. Phila Franks
        - Anne DeLancey (b. 1723) m. John Watts; descendants include the Clan Kennedy of Scotland.
      - Catherine Van Cortlandt m. Andrew Johnston (1694-1762)
      - Elizabeth Van Cortlandt m. Rev. William Skinner
        - Col. William Skinner (d. 1778)
        - Brig. Gen. Cortlandt Skinner (1727-1799) m. Elizabeth Kearney (1731–1810)
      - Philip Van Cortlandt (1683–1746) m. Catherine De Peyster
        - Stephen van Cortlandt (1711–1756)
          - Philip van Cortlandt (1739–1814)
            - Gertrude van Cortlandt m. Sir Edward Buller, 1st Baronet (1764–1824)
              - Anna Maria Buller m. 1824: James Drummond Elphinstone (1788–1857).
                - William Buller Fullerton Elphinstone, 15th Lord Elphinstone (1828–1893) m. 1864: Lady Constance Euphemia Murray (1838–1922) (daughter of Alexander Murray, 6th Earl of Dunmore).
        - Pierre Van Cortlandt (1721–1814) m. Joanna Livingston (1722–1808)
          - Philip Van Cortlandt (1749–1831), died unmarried
          - Catherine Van Cortland (1751–1829) m. Abraham Van Wyck (1738–1786)
          - Pierre Van Cortlandt, Jr. (1762–1848) m. (1) Catherine Clinton (1770–1811) (daughter of George Clinton); m. (2) Anne Stevenson (1774–1821).
            - Pierre Van Cortlandt III (1815–1884) m. Catharine Elizabeth Beck (1818–1895) (daughter of Theodric Romeyn Beck).
              - Catherine Theresa Romeyn Van Cortlandt (1838–1921) m. 1873: John Rutherford Mathews (1835–1898)
              - James Stevenson Van Cortlandt (1844–1917)
              - Theoderick Romeyn Van Cortlandt (1845–1880)
          - Anne De Peyster Van Cortlandt (1766–1855) m. Philip S. Van Rensselaer (1767–1824)
      - Maria Van Cortlandt m. Kiliaen van Rensselaer (1663–1719)
        - Maria van Rensselaer (b. 1702) m. Frederick van Cortlandt
        - Gertrude van Rensselaer (1703–1704)
        - Jeremias van Rensselaer (1705–1745).
        - Stephen van Rensselaer (1707–1747) m. Elizabeth Groesbeck
          - Elizabeth van Rensselaer (b. 1734) m. Abraham Ten Broeck (1734–1810)
          - Stephen van Rensselaer II (1742–1769) m. Catherine Livingston (1745–1810)
            - Stephen van Rensselaer III (1764–1839), sixth and last Patroon of Rensselaerwyck.
            - Philip S. Van Rensselaer (1767–1824), Mayor of the city of Albany, New York
            - Elizabeth Van Rensselaer (1768–1841) m. (1) 1787: John Bradstreet Schuyler (son of General Philip Schuyler); m. (2) 1800: John Bleeker.
        - Johannes van Rensselaer (d. 1719)
        - Gertrude van Rensselaer, (b. 1714) m. (1) Adonis Schuyler; m. (2) Robert Livingston (1708–1790).
        - John Baptist van Rensselaer (1717–1763).
      - Gertrude Van Cortlandt (1683–1746) m. Henry Beekman (1687-1775)
    - Maria Van Cortlandt (1645–1689) m. 1662: Jeremias van Rensselaer (1632–1674)
      - Kiliaen Van Rensselaer (1663–1719) m. 1701: Maria Van Cortlandt, his first cousin.
      - Johannes van Rensselaer
      - Anna van Rensselaer (1665–1723) m. (1) Kilaen Van Rensselaer (d. 1687); m. (2) William Nicoll (1657–1723).
      - Hendrick van Rensselaer (1667–1740) m. Catharina Van Brugh (1665–1730)
      - Maria van Rensselaer (1673–1713) m. Pieter Schuyler (1657–1724)
        - Gertruj Schuyler (b. 1694) m. Johannes Lansing.
        - Philip Schuyler (b. 1696) m. Margarita Schuyler (daughter of Johannes Schuyler).
        - Pieter Schuyler (b. 1698), a twin m. Catherine Groesbeck.
        - Jeremiah Schuyler (b. 1698), a twin m. Susanna Bayeux.
    - Catherine Van Cortlandt (1652–1730) m. (1) Johannes Dervall (d. 1689); m. (2) 1691: Frederick Philipse (1626-1702).
    - Jacobus Van Cortlandt (1658–1739) m. Eva de Vries (b. 1660).
      - Margaret Van Cortlandt (1694–1770) m. Abraham de Peyster (1696–1767) (son of Abraham de Peyster).
      - Frederick Van Cortlandt (1699–1749) m. Frances Jay (1701–1780).
        - James Van Cortlandt (1727–1781) m. Elizabeth Cuyler (1731–1815) (daughter of Cornelis Cuyler).
        - Augustus Van Cortlandt (1728–1823) m. Catherine Barclay (1744–1808) (daughter of Andrew Barclay).
          - Anne Van Cortlandt (1766–1814) m. Henry White (1763–1822)
            - Helen Van Cortlandt White (1792–1881) m. Abraham Schermerhorn (1783–1850).
              - Caroline Webster Schermerhorn (1830–1908) m. William Backhouse Astor Jr. (1829–1892).
          - Helen Van Cortlandt (1768–1812) m. James Morris (1764–1827) (son of Lewis Morris).
        - Eva Van Cortlandt (1737–1836) m. Henry White (1732–1786)
          - Henry White (1763–1822) m. Anne Van Cortlandt (1766–1814)
          - Anne White (c. 1768) m. Sir John Hayes, 1st Baronet (c. 1750–1809)
          - Frederick Van Cortlandt White (1767–1859) m. (1) 1802: Sophia Heaton Coore; (2) Davidson
          - John Chambers White (1770–1845) m. (1) Cordelia Fanshawe (d. 1809); (2) Charlotte Elizabeth Dalrymple
          - Margaret White (1774–1857) m. 1790: Peter Jay Munro (1767–1833)
          - Frances White (b. c. 1777) m. Archibald Bruce (1746–1816)
      - Mary Van Cortlandt (1705–1777) m. 1728: Peter Jay (1704–1782).
        - Eva Jay (1728–1810) m. 1766: Harry Munro (1730–1801)
          - Peter Jay Munro (1767–1833) m. 1790: Margaret White (1774–1857)
        - James Jay (1732–1815) m. Anne Erwin (1750–1840)
        - John Jay (1745–1829) m. Sarah Van Brugh Livingston (1757–1802).
          - Peter Augustus Jay (1776–1843) m. 1807: Mary Rutherfurd Clarkson.
            - John Clarkson Jay (1808–1891) m. Laura Prime (daughter of Nathaniel Prime).
          - Maria Jay (1782–1856) m. Goldsborough Banyer (1775–1806).
          - William Jay (1789–1858) m. Hannah Augusta McVickar (1790–1857).
            - John Jay (1817-1894) m. Eleanor Kingsland Field (1819–1909).
              - William Jay (Colonel) (1841 – 1915) m. Lucie Oelrichs (1854–1931)

=== Living descendants ===
Van Cortlandt descendants are scattered throughout the US, with many dropping the "Van" aspect to Americanize their names and simplify documentation. Noticeable direct descendants include a family in Boca Raton, which includes Enrique Cortlandt and Lourdes Cortlandt, with their four children: Adrian Cortlandt, Henry Cortlandt, Genoveva Cortlandt, and Esteban Cortlandt.

== See also ==
- Bayard family
- Livingston family
- Schuyler family
- Van Rensselaer family
