= Heavy Brigade =

Cavalry formation

A heavy brigade is a formation made up from 'Heavy' Cavalry; i.e. Dragoon Guards and Dragoons.

The Heavy Brigade was a British heavy cavalry unit commanded by General Sir James York Scarlett at the Battle of Balaclava in the Crimean War. The Brigade of 800 horsemen made a charge against Russian cavalry. The Russian force was in retreat and had halted. Although the Heavy Brigade's uphill charge was at no more than a trot, it put the much larger Russian force, of around 3,000, into disorder.

At the Battle of Balaclava the brigade was composed of 2 squadrons each of the 1st Dragoons (The Royals), the 2nd Dragoons (Scots Greys), the 4th Dragoon Guards (Royal Irish), the 5th Dragoon Guards (Princess Charlotte of Wales's), and the 6th Dragoons (Inniskilling).

== See also ==
Heavy Brigade Combat Team
