= Lansing Brown Jr. =

American photographer (1900–1962)

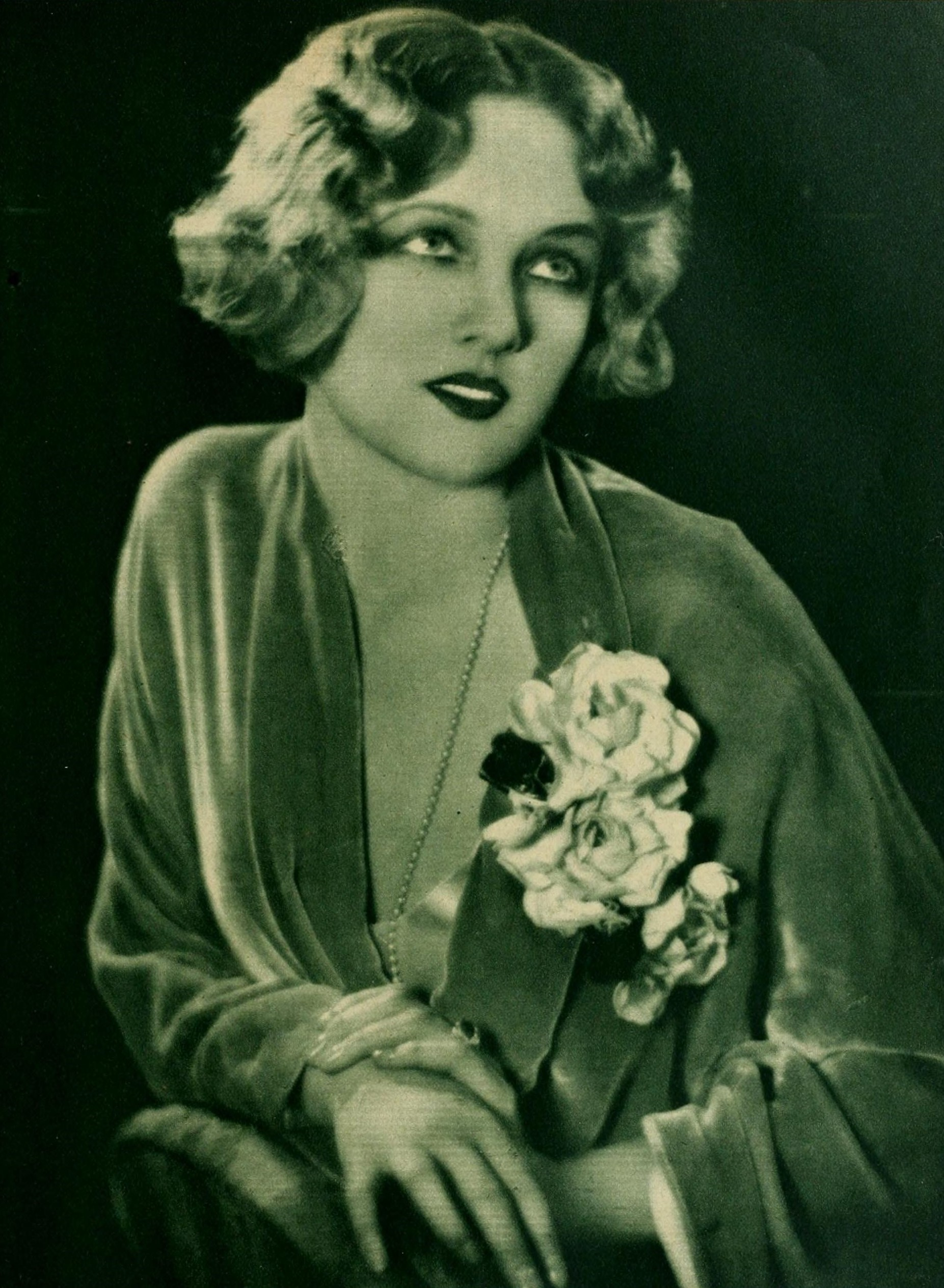
Picture of Virginia Cherrill, taken by Brown in September 1929

Lansing "Lansa" Vanwoert Brown Jr. (August 24, 1900 – February 16, 1962) was an American photographer.

Brown is often recalled for an event on September 2, 1934, in which he accidentally shot and killed his friend, crooner Russ Columbo, when an antique pistol discharged and the bullet ricocheted into Columbo's skull.

After Columbo's death, Brown was cleared of all charges, but he remained deeply affected by the incident.

Brown served in the military during World War II as a photography instructor. He died of a stroke at the West Los Angeles Veterans Administration Hospital.
