= James Morris (sheriff) =

American lawyer and sheriff

Sheriff of New York County
- In office 1798–1801
- Preceded by: Jacob John Lansing
- Succeeded by: John Stagg Jr.

Personal details
- Born: c. 1764 Morrisania, New York
- Died: September 7, 1827 (aged 62–63) Morrisania, New York
- Spouse: Helen Van Cortlandt (m. 1796; died 1812)
- Children: 12
- Parent(s): Mary Walton; Lewis Morris
- Education: Princeton University

James Morris (c. 1764 – September 7, 1827) was an American lawyer who served as Sheriff of New York County.

== Early life ==
Morris born at Morrisania, New York in c. 1764. He was the fourth son of Mary (née Walton) Morris and Founding Father Lewis Morris, third lord of the manor of Morrisania. His father was a prominent landowner who was a signer of the U.S. Declaration of Independence as a delegate to the Continental Congress from New York.

Following the British conquest of New York in 1776, the family was driven from Morrisania, first to Philadelphia then to Rocky Hill near Princeton, New Jersey. He likely completed preparatory studies in Nassau Hall's grammar school before attending Princeton from which he graduated in 1784. While at Princeton, he was a member of the American Whig Society.

== Career ==
After Princeton, he began to study law and was admitted to the bar in the fall of 1787.

In 1797, he was one of three justices appointed for trial of cases and in December 1798, he was appointed to the post of Sheriff of New York County and City, which he was reappointed in each of the two succeeding years.

== Personal life ==
On February 1, 1796, Morris was married to Helen Van Cortlandt (1768–1812), a daughter of Augustus Van Cortlandt and Catherine (née Barclay) Van Cortlandt. Her paternal grandparents were Frederick Van Cortlandt and Frances (née Jay) Van Cortlandt. Her maternal grandparents were Andrew Barclay and Helena (née Roosevelt) Barclay. Together, they were the parents of twelve children, including:

- James Van Cortlandt Morris (1796–1843), who married Catherine Charlton Post, a daughter of Dr. Wright Post, in 1824.
- Augustus Frederick Morris (1797–1859), who married her cousin Harriet Munro, a daughter of Peter Jay Munro, in 1823. After her death in 1836, he married Jane Catherine Maitland, a daughter of Robert Maitland in 1839.
- Catharine Morris (1799–1838), who married, as his second wife, Dr. Alexander Hodgdon Stevens, a son of merchant Ebenezer Stevens, in 1825.
- Helena Van Cortlandt Morris (1801–1852), who married her cousin, Richard Rutherfurd Morris, son of Col. Lewis Morris, in 1823.
- Richard Lewis Morris (1805–1880), who married Elizabeth Fish, a daughter of Adjutant General Nicholas Fish and Elizabeth (née Stuyvesant) Fish, and sister to U.S. Senator Hamilton Fish, in 1829.
- Robert Rutherfurd Morris (1807–1881), who married Hannah Edgar, a daughter of William Edgar Jr. and Cornelia (née LeRoy) Edgar, in 1834.
- Sarah Louisa Morris (1809–1831), who married Edward Augustus LeRoy, son of Herman LeRoy and Hannah (née Cornell) LeRoy, in 1828.
- William Henry Morris (1810–1896), who married Hannah Cornell Newbold, a daughter of Thomas Newbold and Catharine (née LeRoy) Newbold, in 1834. After her death in 1842, he married Caroline Halsted in 1846. After her death in 1848, he married Ella Birckhead, in 1850.
- Charlotte Hay Morris (1812–1838), who married Richard Frederick Kemble, a son of Peter Kemble, in 1836.

Morris died in 1827.
