= Peter Jay Munro =

American politician (1767–1883)

Member of the New York State Assembly
- In office July 1, 1814 – June 30, 1815

Personal details
- Born: January 10, 1767 Rye, Province of New York, British America
- Died: September 22, 1833 (aged 66) New York City, New York, U.S.
- Party: Federalist
- Spouse: Margaret White (m. 1790)
- Relations: John Jay (uncle); Peter Augustus Jay (cousin)
- Children: 12
- Parent(s): Harry Munro; Eva Jay Munro

Peter Jay Munro (January 10, 1767 – September 22, 1833) was an American lawyer and Federalist politician from New York.

== Early life ==
Munro was born on January 10, 1767, in Rye in the Province of New York in what was then British America. He was the only child of the Rev. Harry Munro (1730–1801) and Eva (née Jay) Munro (1728–1810), who later became estranged. His father was the rector of St. Peter's Church in Albany who was forced to flee America in 1778 and return to his native land, Scotland (where he died in 1801), because he was considered a loyalist.

His mother was the eldest child of Peter Jay (a wealthy trader in furs, wheat, timber, and other commodities) and Mary (née Van Cortlandt) Jay (a daughter of Jacobus Van Cortlandt, a New York Assemblyman who was twice elected mayor of New York City, and sister to Frederick Van Cortlandt). His maternal uncle was Founding Father John Jay, who was the second governor of New York and the first chief justice of the United States.

Munro's uncle, John Jay, took him with him on his diplomatic mission to Europe from 1779 to 1784.

== Career ==
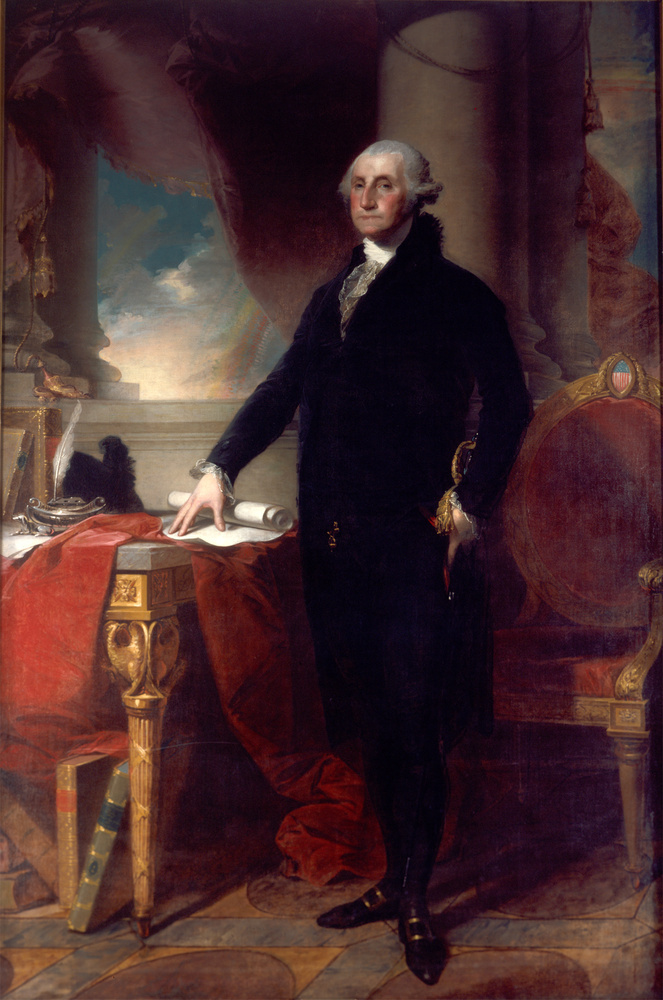
Lansdowne Portrait of George Washington, commissioned by Munro, c. 1800

After returning to the United States, Munro studied law in New York City with Aaron Burr before representing Westchester as a Federalist in the New York State Assembly from 1814 to 1815 during the 38th New York State Legislature and in the Constitutional Convention in 1821.

He later established his own law practice with his cousin Peter Augustus Jay (eldest son of John Jay). With his cousin's assistance, he persuaded his father to sign over his American landholdings to him in 1794.

== Personal life ==
On January 1, 1790, Munro was married to Margaret White (1774–1857), the second daughter of Eva (née Van Cortlandt) White and the Hon. Henry White of the Governor's Council of the Province of New York. Among her siblings were Gen. Frederick Van Cortlandt White and Vice-Admiral Sir John Chambers White. Together, they were the parents of four sons (of whom only one had issue) and eight daughters, including:

- Frances Jay Munro (1797–1869), who married the Rt. Rev. William H. DeLancey, Bishop of Western New York, in 1820.
- Harriet Munro (1798–1836), who married Augustus Frederick Morris (who later took the surname Van Cortlandt to comply with the will of his grandfather, Augustus Van Cortlandt), a son of James Morris and Helena (née Van Cortlandt) Morris.
- Peter Jay Munro (1800–1835), who died unmarried.
- Henry White Munro (1802–1862), who married Anne Margaret Bayley.
- Anna Maria Munro (1806–1865), who married Elias Desbrosses Hunter, only child of New York State Senator John Hunter, in 1832.
- Sarah Jay Munro (d. 1840), who married Asa Whitney, a successful dry-goods merchant.
- John White Munro (1814–1898), who married Frances Augusta Bibby (a great-granddaughter of Augustus Van Cortlandt).

Around 1800, Munro commissioned Gilbert Stuart to paint a portrait of George Washington, which is today known as the Munro-Lenox Portrait as it was donated to the Lenox Library in 1870. The portrait was later sold by the Library (which by then had consolidated into the New York Public Library), and was sold to New York collectors Judy and Michael Steinhardt.

Around 1797, Munro built a country house known as the Manor House in present day Larchmont, New York. "The house faced Boston Post Road, so Munro's Scottish gardener imported some larch seeds from Scotland and planted them to screen the property from the dusty road." The estate was sold to shipping magnate Edward Knight Collins in 1845 who called it Larchmont.

Munro died on September 22, 1833, in New York City. He was buried in the Jay Cemetery in Rye, of which he was one of the original three trustees.

=== Descendants ===
Through his daughter Frances, he was a grandfather of five grandsons and three granddaughters, including Edward Floyd DeLancey, president of the New York Genealogical and Biographical Society.

Through his daughter Anna, he was a grandfather of Elizabeth Desbrosses Hunter (who married her cousin William Heathcote DeLancey Jr.), Anna Maria Hunter (who married Peter Jay Munro Van Cortlandt), and John Hunter III (1833–1914), who inherited Hunter's Island and sold it to former mayor Ambrose Kingsland in 1866. John Hunter III married Annie Manigault Middleton of Middleton Place, Charleston, South Carolina.
