= Henry Munro (loyalist) =

- Born: {1730; Dingwall, Scotland
- Died: May 30, 1801 (aged 70–71); Edinburgh, Scotland

Henry Munro (1730 – 30 May 1801) was a chaplain in the British Army who became a missionary to the Mohawk people during the 18th century.

== Early life ==
Munro was born in Dingwall, Scotland in 1730. He was the son of physician Robert Munro and his wife, Anne Munro. According to his son-in-law, Donald Fisher, his paternal grandfather was Alexander Munro, Laird of Killichoan, (Note: Historian Alexander Mackenzie does not mention Henry Munro as a son of Robert in the Munro of Killichoan chapter of his book, History of the Munros of Fowlis (Foulis) (1898). Fisher and Mackenzie also give different lineages for the connection of the Munros of Killichoan back to the Munros of Foulis Castle. According to Mackenzie the said Robert Munro was the son of Alexander Munro, 2nd Laird of Killichoan and that the Munros of Killichoan descended directly from George Munro, 10th Baron of Foulis (d. 1452). According to Fisher, Henry Munro's father, Dr. Robert Munro, was the son of Alexander Munro, Laird of Killichoan and that the Munros of Killichoan descended directly from Sir Robert Munro, 3rd Baronet (of Foulis, d. 1688). Mackenzie does however state that in 1723 a woman called Mary Bain complained to the Kiltearn Session that Robert Munro, son of Alexander Munro of Killichoan, had fathered her child, which Robert denied, but that the Session ordered Robert Munro's servants to assist Mary Bain. In contrast to Mackenzie's account of Robert Munro, Fisher states that Robert was a physician by profession, and joined the royal forces, under Lord Loudon during the Jacobite rising of 1745 against Bonnie Prince Charlie. Fisher goes on to say that Robert served the whole of the long and fatiguing campaign of 1745, suffered exceedingly from exposure and privation, and died from the consequences the following year, quite a young man. Robert's gravestone dated 1744 with his initials and a Munro Eagle was believed to have been at the Cille Bhrea church, or St.Brig's Chapel or St.Mary's, but since 1966 it has disappeared.) and his maternal grandparents were Sir John Munro, 4th Baronet, a Scottish nobleman, and Lady Agnes Mackenzie (a daughter of Kenneth Mackenzie, 3rd Earl of Seaforth).

Following the death of his parents, sixteen-year-old Harry enrolled at the University of Edinburgh where he earned a bachelor's degree and a master's degree. He then studied divinity and was ordained in the Church of Scotland in 1757.

== Career ==
During the Seven Years' War, Munro came to America as the chaplain of the 77th Highlander Regiment. After landing in Charleston, South Carolina, the regiment went to Philadelphia in 1758 and later served at Fort Duquesne. In 1759, he served at Crown Point and Ticonderoga. He later accompanied the regiment to Canada and the West Indies before returning to the Province of New York in 1762 as a civilian.

During the 1760s, his religious beliefs evolved to where he went to England to pursue Anglican Holy Orders. Munro was ordained in the church of England in 1765 and then returned to America where he conducted a mission on Philipsburgh Manor in Westchester County. In 1768, Harry Munro left Yonkers to become the rector of St. Peter's Church in Albany where he had considerable influence among the Mohawks.

A loyalist, Munro was imprisoned for his sympathies. He escaped and fled America in 1778, returning to Scotland. Back in Scotland, he received an honorary doctorate from the University of St Andrews in 1782 before retiring. He suffered paralysis in 1791, and moved to Edinburgh where he died in 1801.

== Personal life ==
Munro was married three times. His first wife, the widow of a regimental officer, died in 1760 leaving him with an infant daughter:

- Elizabeth Munro (1759–c. 1850), who married Donald Fisher (who was born in Killin, Perthshire, Scotland) in 1776.

Around 1763, he married a Miss Stockton from Princeton, New Jersey and built a house there. She died a year later after bearing him a son.

In 1766, he married 38 year-old Eva Jay, the eldest child of prominent merchant Peter Jay and Mary (née Van Cortlandt) Jay (a daughter of Jacobus Van Cortlandt, a New York Assemblyman who was twice elected mayor of New York City, and sister to Frederick Van Cortlandt). Her younger brother was John Jay (who later became a Founding Father and was the second governor of New York and the first chief justice of the United States). Together, they were the parents of one son:

- Peter Jay Munro (1767–1833), who married Margaret White (1774–1857), the second daughter of Eva (née Van Cortlandt) White and the Hon. Henry White of the Governor's Council of the Province of New York, in 1790.

Munro died in Edinburgh, Scotland on 30 May 1801.

=== Killichoan ===
Munro's former home Killichoan House, was burnt in 1982, although it had previously been renamed Mountrich by later owners. The remains of the old chapel at Killichoan were destroyed by the Highland Railway.

== See also ==
- Clan Munro
