= Calmon Luboviski =

Russian-American violinist (1895–1965)

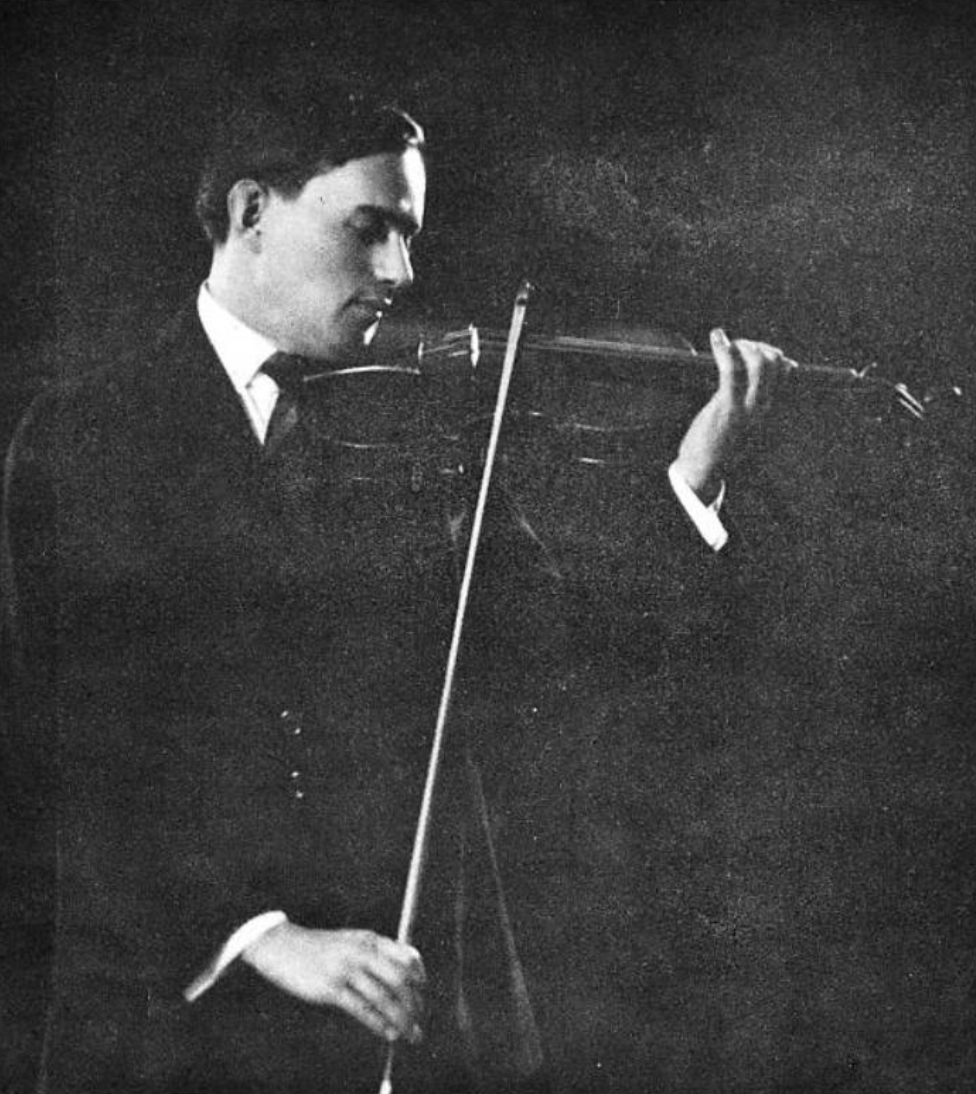
- Luboviski in 1928

Background information
- Born: 1895; Russian Empire
- Died: October 27, 1965 (aged 69–70) Los Angeles, California, U.S.

Calmon Luboviski (1895 – October 27, 1965) was a Russian-American violinist. Situated in Chicago, he was one of the most well-known musical artists in the area, being a member of several distinguished orchestras.

== Biography ==
Calmon Luboviski was born in 1895 in the Russian Empire, and immigrated to the United States during his formative years. As a teenager, he briefly lived in Berlin, Germany, becoming a pupil of the renowned violinist and composer Franz von Vescey.

He later became a prominent figure in the Chicago music scene, performing with various noteworthy orchestras, namely those of Richard Strauss, Walter Damrosch, Alfred Hertz, and Walter Henry Rothwell.

He died on October 27, 1965, in Los Angeles, California, where he had resided for a number of years.
