= Godfrey Dalrymple-White =

British Army officer and politician (1866–1954)

Sir Godfrey Dalrymple Dalrymple-White, 1st Baronet (6 July 1866 – 1 April 1954), known as Godfrey White until 1926, was a Conservative Party politician in the United Kingdom.

Dalrymple-White was the son of General Sir Henry Dalrymple White and his second wife Alice Elizabeth (née Malcolm), and was educated at Wellington College, Berkshire, and the Royal Military College, Sandhurst. He joined the Grenadier Guards and was promoted to lieutenant on 7 February 1885, and captain on 13 February 1897.

When the Second Boer War broke out in South Africa he went there with a battalion of his regiment in 1900, and took part in operations in the Transvaal, east of Pretoria, July–November 1900, including the battle of Belfast. In November 1900 he was present at the actions near Caledon River; then served in Orange River Colony and Cape Colony from December 1900 to May 1902. Following the end of hostilities, he left Cape Town in late June 1902 on board the SS City of Vienna, arriving at Southampton the following month. For his service during the war, he had been promoted to major on 23 July 1901, was mentioned in dispatches, and received the Queen's South Africa Medal with three clasps, and the King's South Africa Medal with two clasps. After the war he served as Station Commandant. He later served in the First World War and achieved the rank of Lieutenant-Colonel in the Grenadier Guards.

Dalrymple-White was also involved in politics and sat as Member of Parliament (MP) for Southport from January 1910 to 1923 and from 1924 to 1931. In 1926 he assumed by deed poll the additional surname of Dalrymple and in the 1926 Birthday Honours he was created a baronet, of High Mark in the County of Wigtown.

Dalrymple-White married, in 1912, the Hon. Catherine Mary, daughter of Byron Cary, 12th Viscount Falkland. He died in April 1954, aged 87, and was succeeded in the baronetcy by his son, Henry.

== Notes ==
Parliament of the United Kingdom
Preceded by John Meir Astbury	Member of Parliament for Southport; 1910–1923	Succeeded by Sir John Brunner, Bt
Preceded by Sir John Brunner, Bt	Member of Parliament for Southport; 1924–1931	Succeeded by Robert Hudson
Baronetage of the United Kingdom
New title	Baronet (of High Mark); 1926–1954	Succeeded by Henry Arthur Dalrymple Dalrymple-White
