= Henry Dalrymple White =

British Army general (1820-1886)

General Sir Henry Dalrymple White KCB
- Born: 5 July 1820
- Died: 27 March 1886 (aged 65)
- Military career
- Allegiance: United Kingdom
- Branch: British Army
- Rank: General
- Commands: 6th (Inniskilling) Dragoons
- Conflicts: Crimean War
- Awards: Knight Commander of the Order of the Bath
- Spouses: Louisa Mary Smith; Alice Elizabeth Malcolm
- Father: Vice-Admiral Sir John White

General Sir Henry Dalrymple White KCB (5 July 1820 – 27 March 1886) was a senior British Army officer.

== Military career ==
Born the son of Vice-Admiral Sir John White, White was commissioned into the 6th (Inniskilling) Dragoons and purchased a captaincy in his regiment in 1844. He became commanding officer of his regiment in May 1854 and led a squadron of his men at the Charge of the Heavy Brigade during the Battle of Balaclava in October 1854. His helmet was pierced by a Russian sabre during the charge. White served as colonel of the 2nd Dragoon Guards (Queen's Bays) from 1873 to 1874 and as colonel of the 6th (Inniskilling) Dragoons from 1874 until his death in 1886.

He married Louisa Mary Smith; they had one daughter. Following the death of his first wife, he married Alice Elizabeth Malcolm; they had two sons (Arthur Dalrymple White and Sir Godfrey Dalrymple-White).

Military offices
Preceded by Henry Cavendish	Colonel of the 2nd Dragoon Guards (Queen's Bays); 1873–1874	Succeeded by Sir Alexander Low
Preceded by Lewis Duncan Williams	Colonel of the 6th (Inniskilling) Dragoons; 1874–1886	Succeeded by Sir Charles Shute
