= Jacob John Lansing =

American sheriff

Sheriff of New York County
- In office September 29, 1795 – December 28, 1798
- Preceded by: Marinus Willett
- Succeeded by: James Morris

Jacob John Lansing was an American who served as Sheriff of New York County.

== Career ==
Lansing was appointed Sheriff of New York County on September 29, 1795, to succeed Marinus Willett. He was removed from office on December 28, 1798 "on account of his politics" during the administration of Gov. John Jay, and was succeeded by James Morriss.

== See also ==
- New York City Sheriff's Office
