= Lensing =

Lensing is a surname. Notable people with the surname include:

- Kees Lensing (born 1978), Namibian rugby union player
- Sascha Lensing (born 1973), German politician
- Vicki Lensing (born 1957), American politician
- Wilhelmina Elisabeth Lensing (1847–1925), Dutch feminist, politician and writer

== See also ==
- Lens (optics)
- Gravitational lensing, bending of light by a mass
- Thermal lensing, an atmospheric effect on laser beams
- Michelle Lensink (born 1970), Australian politician, Minister for Human Services
