= 6th (Inniskilling) Dragoons =

British Army cavalry regiment

The Inniskillings (6th Dragoons)
- Badge of the Inniskilling Dragoons
- Active: 1689–1922
- Country: Ireland (1689–1800); United Kingdom (1801–1922)
- Allegiance: British Empire
- Branch: British Army
- Type: Cavalry of the Line
- Role: Heavy Cavalry
- Size: 1 Regiment
- Nicknames: The Skins; The Skillingers
- Motto: Inniskilling
- March: (Quick) Fare Ye Well Enniskillen. (Slow) The Inniskilling Dragoons.

Commanders
- Notable commanders: Field Marshal Viscount Allenby

The 6th (Inniskilling) Dragoons was a cavalry regiment in the British Army, first raised in 1689 as Sir Albert Cunningham's Regiment of Dragoons. One of the regiment's most notable battles was the Battle of the Boyne in July 1690. It became the 6th (Inniskilling) Regiment of Dragoons in 1751. The regiment also fought with distinction in the Charge of the Union Brigade at the Battle of Waterloo and again as part of the successful Charge of the Heavy Brigade against superior numbers at the Battle of Balaclava during the Crimean War.

The First World War sounded the death knell for mounted cavalry as it became apparent that technology had moved forward with greater destructive power and made horsed cavalry redundant on the modern battlefield. The British Army reorganised and reduced its cavalry corps by disbanding or amalgamating many of its famous cavalry regiments. The Inniskillings was one of those affected. It saw service for two centuries, including the First World War, before being amalgamated with 5th (Princess Charlotte of Wales's) Dragoon Guards to form 5th/6th Dragoons in 1922.

== History ==
=== Formation ===
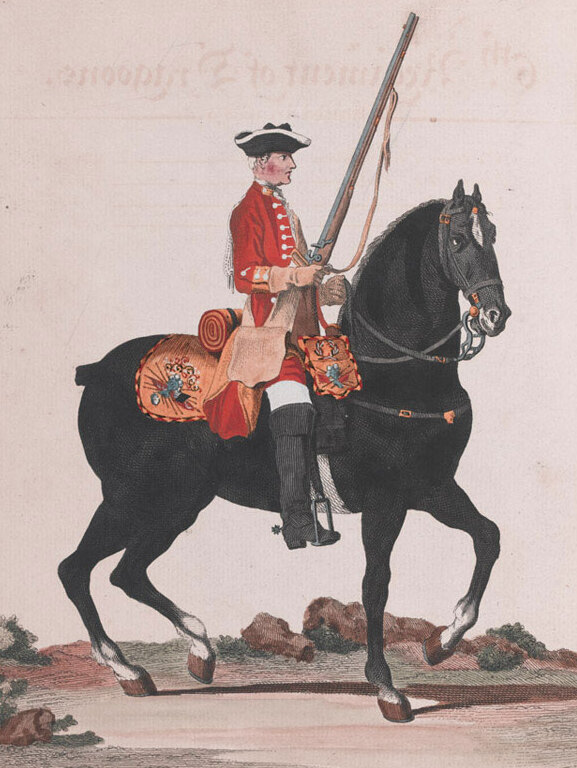
c. 1742 engraving of a regimental private

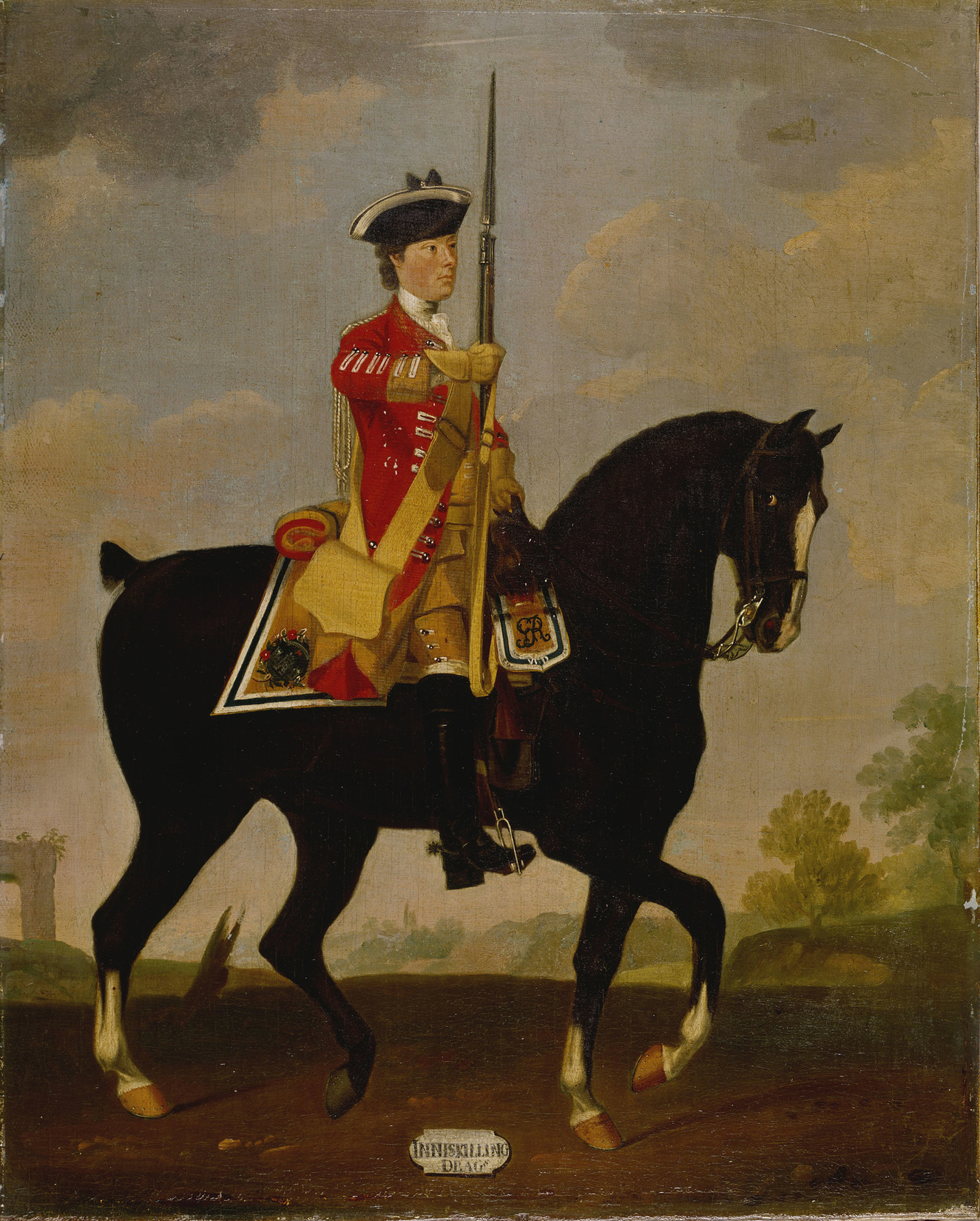
c. 1751 painting of a regimental private

In 1689 James II Stuart, the dethroned King of England, landed in Ireland with aid provided by the French in an attempt to overthrow William of Orange. During the Defence of Enniskillen in 1689 the Governor of the town Gustav Hamilton raised three regiments to fight on the side of William of Orange.

An oath was taken by each man upon a bible:

I, D. H., do hereby testify and declare, and upon the Holy Evangelists swear, that I will own and acknowledge Gustavus Hamilton, Esq., Chief Governor of this town of Enniskillen, and shall give due obedience to him and my superior officers in all his and their commands, and shall to the utmost of my power and ability defend him, them, and this place, with the country adjacent, together with the Protestant religion and interest, with my life and fortune, against all that shall endeavour to subvert the same. So help me God, and the holy contents of this book.

One of the regiments raised was a cavalry unit of Dragoons (mounted troops), first established on 20 June 1689. As was the custom of that time the regiment was named Cunningham's Dragoons (or Conyngham's Dragoons) - after its commanding officer, Sir Albert Cunningham (or Conyngham) and ranked as the 6th Dragoons. It would later become known as the "Enniskillen Dragoons", after Hamilton's headquarters at Enniskillen Castle. Inniskilling was the first English name of the town - anglicised from Irish meaning 'Island of Kathleen'. Since then the name has changed around 20 times before finally settling on its present spelling of Enniskillen.

=== Early wars ===
After the relief of the Siege of Derry in 1689 the regiment continued its pursuance of the Williamite Wars. On 19 June an attempt was made to force contact with Jacobite forces under the command of Brigadier Sutherland. The "Enniskilliners" came upon a force of horse and foot at the churchyard of Belturbet and what followed is described by Thomas Witherow:

Tuesday proved to be a day of incessant rain, so that all military operations were for the time suspended; but a Council of War was held by the Enniskilleners, and, as it was in vain to think of overtaking Sutherland, it was resolved to attack the party in Belturbet. Next day, Wednesday the 19th of June, they marched forward, and when within two miles of the town, the dragoons of both parties came in sight of each other. After an exchange of shots, the horse of the enemy were driven back and pursued into Belturbet, and the Enniskillen horse surrounding the church and churchyard, kept them there till the foot came forward and secured possession of the adjoining buildings. Having taken up their position in the houses overtopping the churchyard, they so galled the garrison with their shot that at the end of two hours it consented to surrender. The conditions were that all the prisoners should have their lives, and that the officers, in addition, should be allowed to retain their clothes and money. The result was that nearly three hundred prisoners and a great booty fell to the victors, consisting of two barrels of powder, seven hundred muskets, fifty-three dragoon horses, and as many red coats as served for two companies. In addition, a great quantity of provisions amounting to twenty tons of bread, flour, wheat, and malt, was sent to Enniskillen by water. Thirteen commissioned officers were detained as prisoners, but the two hundred common soldiers were taken to Enniskillen, and were employed in erecting the fort, which was then approaching completion.

The regiment was numbered the 7th Dragoon Regiment in 1690 and fought with distinction at the Battle of the Boyne in July 1690. In 1691 it was renamed Echlin's Dragoons (also known as the Enniskillen Horse). In June 1715, the regiment, by then called Stair's Dragoons or The Black Dragoons, deployed one squadron to suppress riots at Manchester, and then in November 1715 deployed troops at the Battle of Sheriffmuir during the Jacobite rising. The regiment went to Flanders in 1742 and fought at the Battle of Dettingen in June 1743 and the Battle of Fontenoy in May 1745 and the Battle of Rocoux in October 1746 as well as the Battle of Lauffeld in July 1747 during the War of the Austrian Succession. The regiment was renamed the 6th (Inniskilling) Regiment of Dragoons in 1751.

The regiment then fought at the Battle of Minden in August 1759 and the Battle of Wetter also in August 1759 during the Seven Years' War.

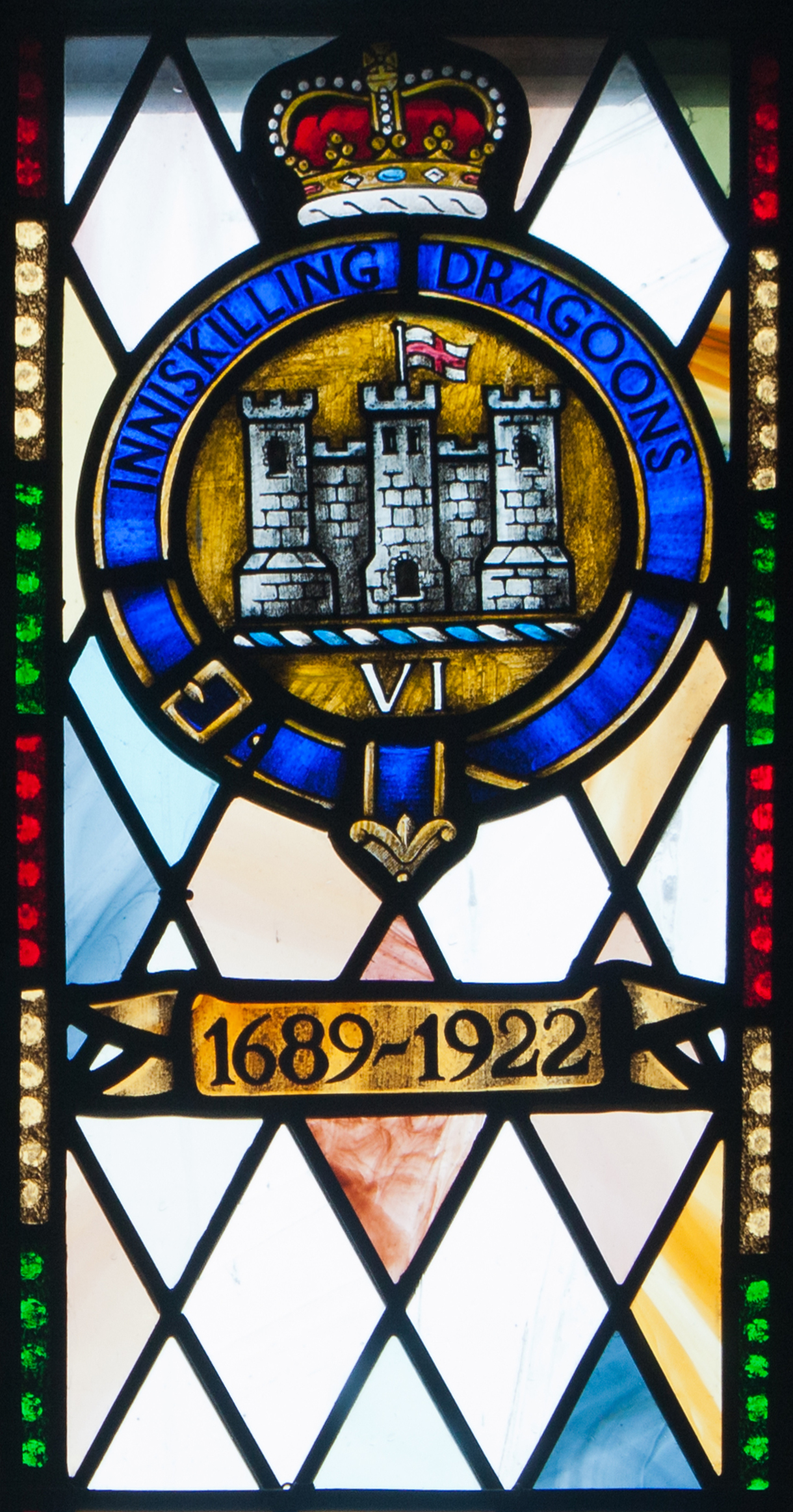
Memorial window at St Macartin's Cathedral, Enniskillen

=== The Charge of The Union Brigade at Waterloo ===
The Union Brigade was composed of three regiments of heavy cavalry, one English (The Royal Dragoons), one Scottish The Scots Greys and one Irish (the Inniskillings), hence their brigade title. The Inniskillings were commanded by Lieutenant-Colonel Joseph Muter, who was wounded during the battle and took charge of the Brigade on the death of Major-General Sir William Ponsonby.

"The Union Cavalry Brigade was now ordered forward. The 6th/Inniskilling Dragoons passed through the ranks of the Royal Scots and the Black Watch, and the Royal Dragoons, further to the right, went through the 28th Foot and passed the right flank of the Royal Scots. The Greys, who had been in a theoretical reserve position, according to W. A. Thorburn, late curator at the National War Museum of Scotland, "moved straight to their front, which took them through the ranks of the Gordons. The head of the French Division was now only 20 yards away and the Greys simply walked into the 1st/45th Infantry of the Line. There was no gallop and no charge." It is clear from the French report that they did not expect to see British cavalry materializing through the ranks of the British infantry. When the cavalry hit them, the 45th were in the act of forming line, and their 1st battalion was at once thrown into violent confusion, already shaken by the fire of the 92nd. The regimental eagles were carried by the 1st battalion of all French infantry regiments, and in a few minutes the Greys were in the midst of the battalion, at which stage Sergeant Charles Ewart of Captain Vernor's troop captured the eagle of the 45th. He was ordered to take it to the rear, which he reluctantly did, but sat on his horse for sometime watching the engagement before finally setting off for Brussels with his trophy. The rest of the French columns believed what they saw could only be an advance guard, and were now under the mistaken impression that they were being attacked by large numbers of cavalry. The Royal Dragoons and 6th/Inniskilling Dragoons charged Donzelot's Division and the Eagle of the 105th Regiment was taken by the Royal Dragoons. These were the only two Eagles captured during the entire Waterloo campaign. At this point the divisions of Marcognet and Donzelot were not completely shaken, although contrary to romantic legend, the Union Brigade did not, and could not, defeat an Army Corps of some 16,900 infantry on their own. Having carried out a highly successful defensive action in support of infantry, the Union Brigade lost all cohesion and refused to recognize or hear any orders. The Greys were given the recall several times but were so out of hand that no notice was taken. Instead they went off on a wild rampage down the interval between the French Divisions, NOT through the troops themselves; many Greys were shot by the surprised and somewhat bewildered rear French battalions, who were still advancing, unaware of the confusion on their own front, or of the defeat of their leading brigade. In fact, the French infantry, expecting what they thought must be the main cavalry attack (by their own massive standards), finally brought themselves to halt, made an effort to form to receive Cavalry, and finally fell back in considerable confusion."

=== The Charge of the Heavy Brigade at Balaclava ===
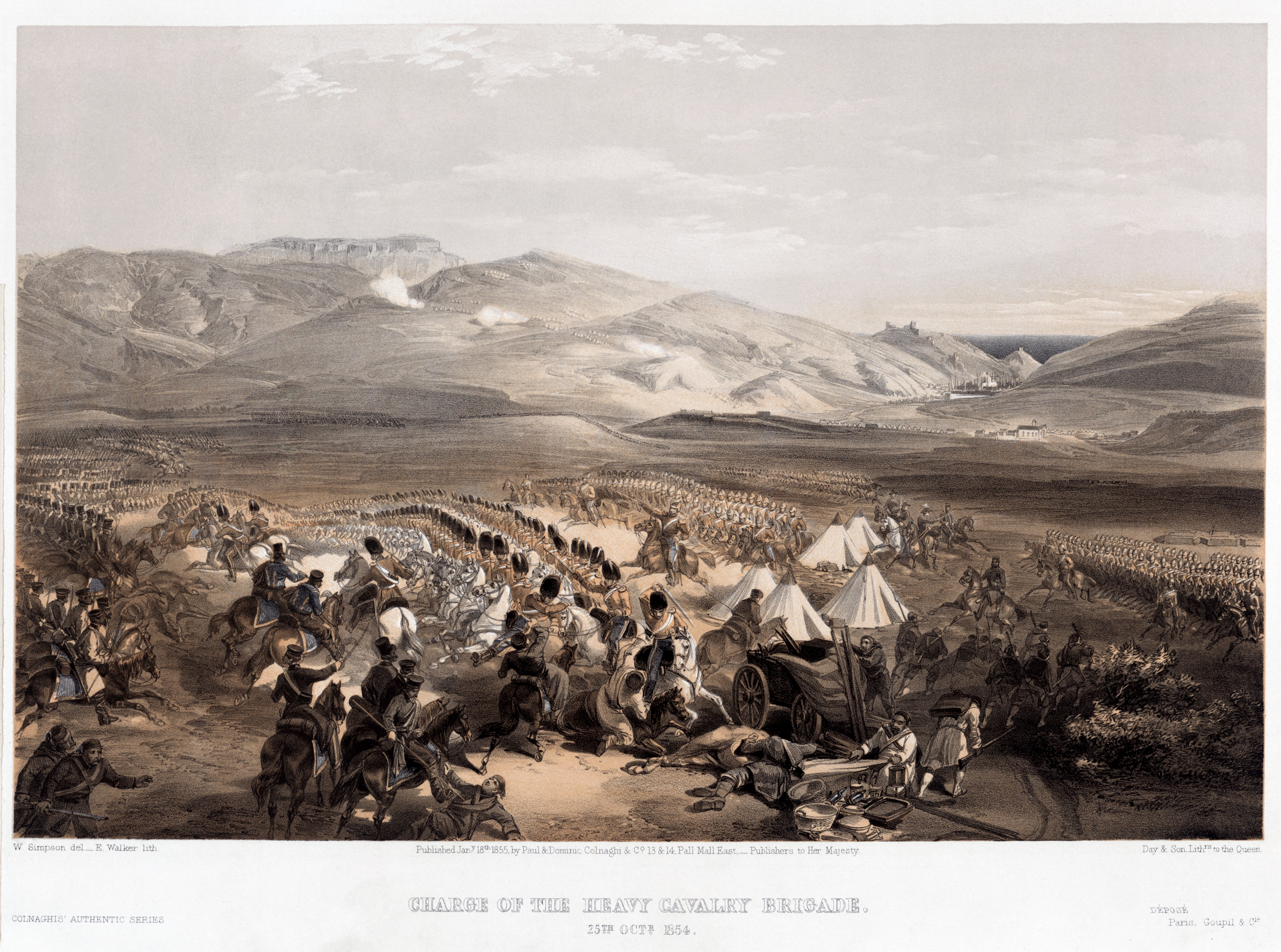
William Simpson's lithograph depicting the 6th Inniskilling Dragoons at the Battle of Balaclava

The regiment was deployed to the Crimea in April 1854 but during the voyage the regiment's transport ship Europa sank with the loss of the commanding officer, Lieutenant Colonel Willoughby Moore, and 17 of his men. Lieutenant-Colonel Henry Dalrymple White took over command of the regiment and led it in action at the Battle of Balaclava in October 1854.

The first assault line consisted of the Scots Greys and one squadron of the Inniskillings, a total of less than 250 sabres. Only when the RSMs declared themselves happy with the alignment did Scarlett order his bugler to sound the 'Charge'. The idea of a charge conjures up images of the Light Brigade dashing forward at speed but Dragoons were larger men with much heavier equipment so their charge was more of a trot. Floundering at obstacles such as ditches or coppices they headed towards the massed ranks of Russian cavalry, pressing on inexorably at a mere 8 miles an hour. Slow they may have been but the effect of these heavy cavalrymen slamming into the much lighter Russian cavalry stunned their enemy. A letter from a Captain of the Inniskillings illustrates the mellee which followed:

"Forward - dash - bang - clank, and there we were in the midst of such smoke, cheer, and clatter, as never before stunned a mortal's ear. it was glorious! Down, one by one, aye, two by two fell the thick skulled and over-numerous Cossacks.....Down too alas! fell many a hero with a warm Celtic heart, and more than one fell screaming loud for victory. I could not pause. It was all push, wheel, frenzy, strike and down, down, down they went. Twice I was unhorsed, and more than once I had to grip my sword tighter, the blood of foes streaming down over the hilt, and running up my very sleeve....now we were lost in their ranks - now in little bands battling - now in good order together, now in and out."

In the words of Colonel Paget of the Light Brigade "It was a mighty affair, and considering the difficulties under which the Heavy Brigade laboured, and the disparity of numbers, a feat of arms which, if it ever had its equal, was certainly never surpassed in the annals of cavalry warfare, and the importance of which in its results can never be known."

=== Late 19th century ===
In 1861 the regiment was renamed the 6th (Inniskilling) Dragoons. The regiment saw action in the response to the Indian Rebellion in 1857 and was next deployed during the Anglo-Zulu War in 1879. The regiment was in Scotland from 1895 until 1897, when it was posted to Ireland.

=== Second Boer War ===
After the outbreak of the Second Boer War in October 1899, the regiment was sent to South Africa. It formed part of General French′s force in the operations around Colesberg, and afterwards one squadron took part in the relief of Kimberley in February 1900. The squadrons of the regiment then rejoined, and formed part of the cavalry brigade which served in all the engagements in the general advance on Pretoria, one of the Boer capitals, which was captured on 5 June 1900. They took part in the battles of Diamond Hill (June 1900) and Belfast (August 1900), and in the following cavalry advance on Barberton in the Eastern Transvaal. The regiment subsequently joined a column under the command of Colonel Michael Rimington in the Orange River Colony, taking part in miscellaneous raids and drives there throughout the last year of the war, which ended with the Peace of Vereeniging on 31 May 1902.

Following the end of the war, 257 officers and men of the regiment left Cape Town on the SS Orissa, which arrived at Southampton in late October 1902, and another 138 men arrived at Queenstown the following month on the SS Orient. After their return, the regiment was stationed at Curragh.

=== Early 20th century and the First World War ===
The regiment subsequently went to India. They eventually returned from Mhow in India in August 1914 and landed at Marseille as part of the 5th (Mhow) Cavalry Brigade in the 2nd Indian Cavalry Division in December 1914 for service on the Western Front.

During the split between Northern Ireland and the Irish Free State, the regiment was among the few Irish units retained. In 1921 it was renamed from the 6th (Inniskilling) Dragoons to The Inniskillings (6th Dragoons). It amalgamated with 5th (Princess Charlotte of Wales's) Dragoon Guards to form 5th/6th Dragoons in 1922.

== Regimental museum ==
The regimental museum, along with that of the Royal Inniskilling Fusiliers, is housed in Enniskillen Castle.

== The Regimental Chapel ==
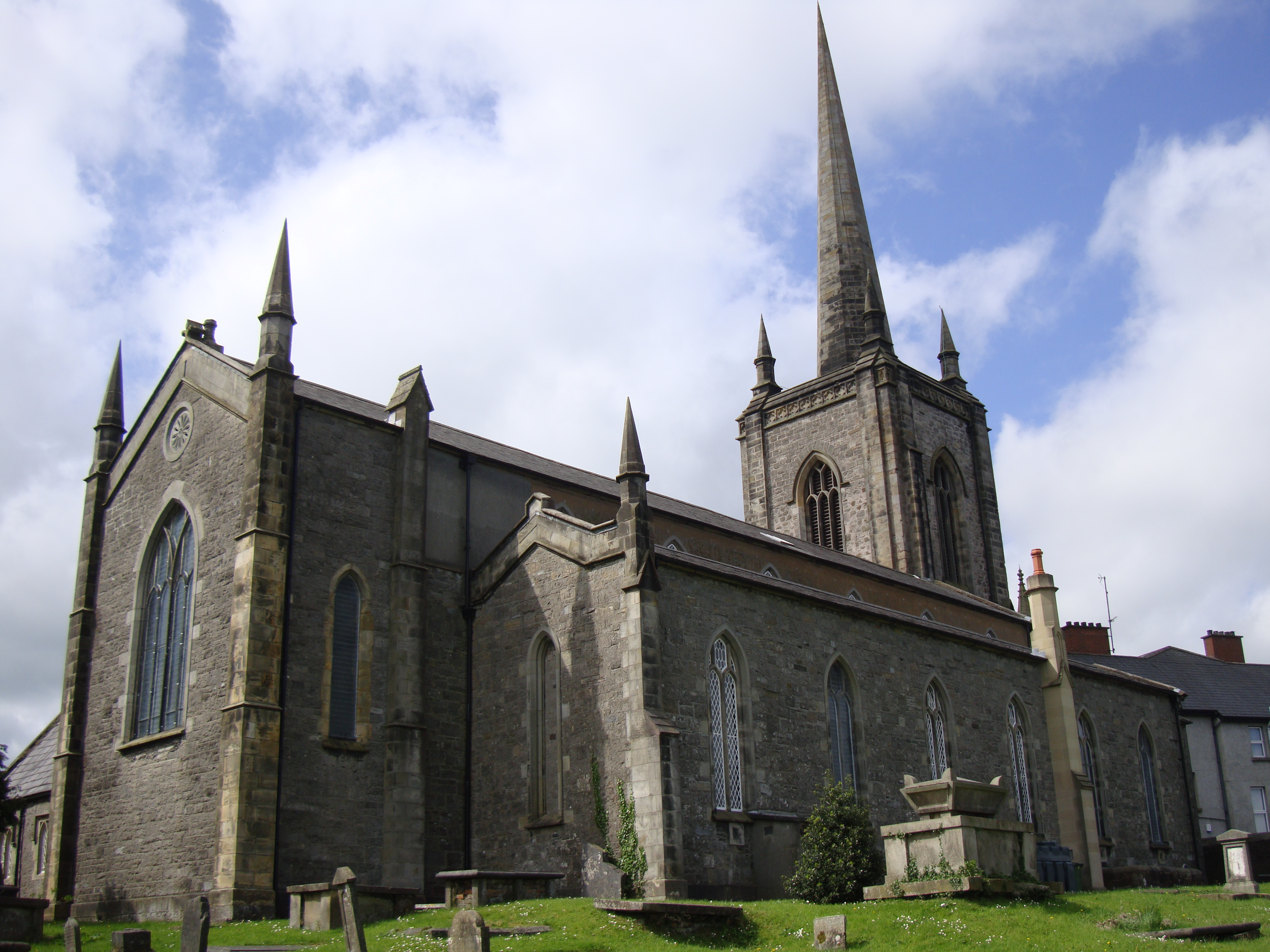
St Macartin's Cathedral, Enniskillen

The regimental chapel is in St Macartin's Cathedral, Enniskillen.

== Enniskillen Castle ==
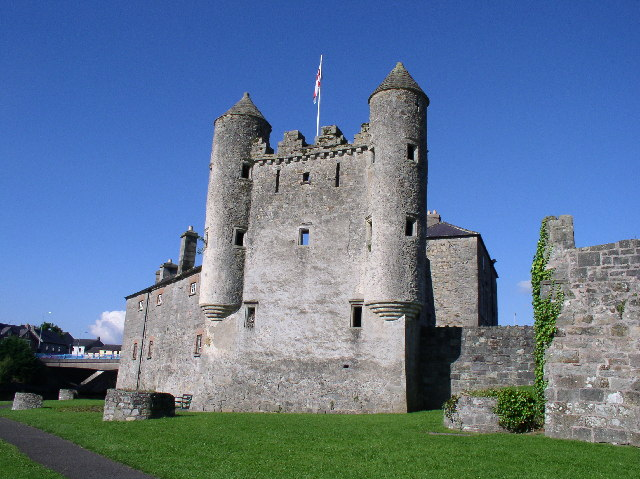
Enniskillen Castle

Enniskillen Castle and the regiments raised at Enniskillen during the Williamite Wars are inextricably linked. The Inniskilling Dragoons were quartered there many times since their formation. The badge of the regiment also features a depiction of the castle.

== Notable Dragoons ==
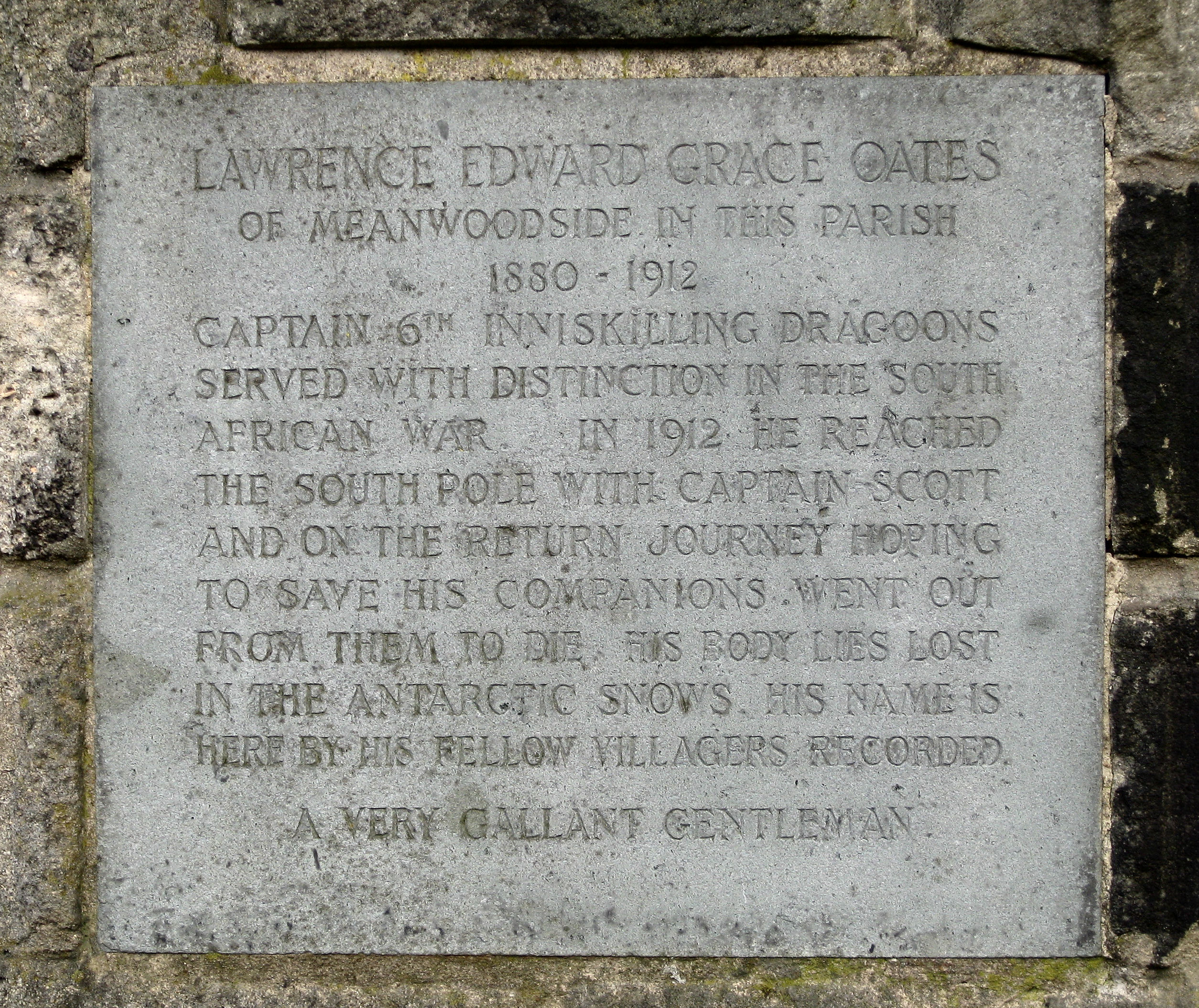
Monument to Lawrence 'Titus' Oates, close to Holy Trinity Church, Meanwood, Leeds

- Field Marshal Lord Edmund Henry Hynman Allenby, served with the regiment from 1882-1900.
- Captain Lawrence 'Titus' Oates was an officer in the regiment. The Royal Dragoon Guards commemorates Oates each year on St Patrick's Day which was his birthday and the day he died on. This is the only case where the British Army commemorates an individual as opposed to a battle honour.

== Battle honours ==
The regiment's battle honours were as follows:

- Early Wars: Dettingen, Warburg, Willems, Waterloo, Balaklava, Sevastopol, South Africa 1899-1902
- The Great War: Somme 1916 '18, Morval, Cambrai 1917 '18, St. Quentin, Avre, Lys, Hazebrouck, Amiens, Hindenburg Line, St. Quentin Canal, Beaurevoir, Pursuit to Mons, France and Flanders 1914-18

== Colonel-in-Chief ==
- 1897: F.M. HRH Arthur William Patrick Albert, 1st Duke of Connaught & Strathearn, KG, KT, GCB, GCSI, GCMG, GCIE, GCVO, GBE, VD, TD (died 1942)

== Colonels — with other names for the regiment ==
The colonels of the regiment were as follows:

6th Dragoons

- 1689 Col. Sir Albert Cunningham app. 31 December 1689 — Sir Albert Cunningham's Regiment of Dragoons
- 1691 Lt-Gen. Robert Echlin app. 30 December 1691 — Echlin's Dragoons

also known as Black Dragoons - (1715)

- 1715 F.M. John, Earl of Stair app. 4 March 1714/1715 — Dalrymple's Dragoons or Earl of Stair's Dragoons
- 1734 Gen. Charles, Lord Cadogan app. 19 June 1734 — Lord Cadogan's Dragoons
- 1743 F.M. John, Earl of Stair app. 25 April 1743 — Earl of Stair's Dragoons
- 1745 Gen. John, Earl of Rothes app. 29 May 1745 — Leslie's or Earl of Rothes' Dragoons
- 1750–1775 Gen. James Cholmondeley app. 16 June 1750– Cholmondeley's Dragoons (to 1751)

On 1 July 1751 a royal warrant provided that in future regiments would not be known by their colonels' names, but by their "number or rank"

6th (Inniskilling) Regiment of Dragoons - (1751)

- 1775 Lt-Gen. Edward Harvey app. 18 October 1775
- 1778 Gen. James Johnston app. 2 April 1778
- 1797 Gen. George, Earl of Pembroke app. 15 December 1797
- 1827 Gen. William Lumley app. 3 November 1827
- 1840 Lt-Gen. Joseph Straton app. 30 April 1840
- 1840 Gen. George Pownall Adams app. 26 October 1840
- 1856 Gen. James Jackson app. 11 June 1856
- 1860 Lt-Gen. Thomas Marten app. 12 November 1860

6th (Inniskilling) Dragoons - (1861)

- 1868 Lt-Gen. Lewis Duncan Williams app. 23 Nov 1868
- 1874 Gen. Henry Dalrymple White app. 1 August 1874
- 1886 Gen. Charles Cameron Shute app. 28 March 1886
- 1904 Lt-Gen. Edward Arthur Gore app. 1 May 1904

The Inniskillings (6th Dragoons) - (1921)

- 1912-1922 Maj-Gen. Sir Michael Frederic Rimington app. 17 June 1912
- On 22 October 1922 the regiment was amalgamated with the 5th (Princess Charlotte of Wales's) Dragoon Guards to form the 5th/6th Dragoons.

Successor regiment names:

- 5th/6th Dragoons - (1922)
- 5th Inniskilling Dragoon Guards - (1927)
- 5th Royal Inniskilling Dragoon Guards - (1935)
- Royal Dragoon Guards - (1992) (On amalgamation with 4th/7th Dragoon Guards)

== See also ==
- British cavalry during the First World War
- "Fare Thee Well Enniskillen", the regimental quick march

== Sources ==
- Cannon, Richard (1846). Historical record of the Sixth, or Inniskilling Regiment of Dragoons: containing an account of the formation of the regiment in 1689, and of its subsequent services to 1846. London.
- Dalton, Charles (1904). The Waterloo roll call. With biographical notes and anecdotes. London: Eyre and Spottiswoode.
- Witherow, Thomas (1913). Derry and Enniskillen in the Year 1689 (4th ed.). Belfast: William Mullan & Son. OCLC 693002860.
