= Archibald Bruce (mineralogist) =

American physician and mineralogist (1777–1818)

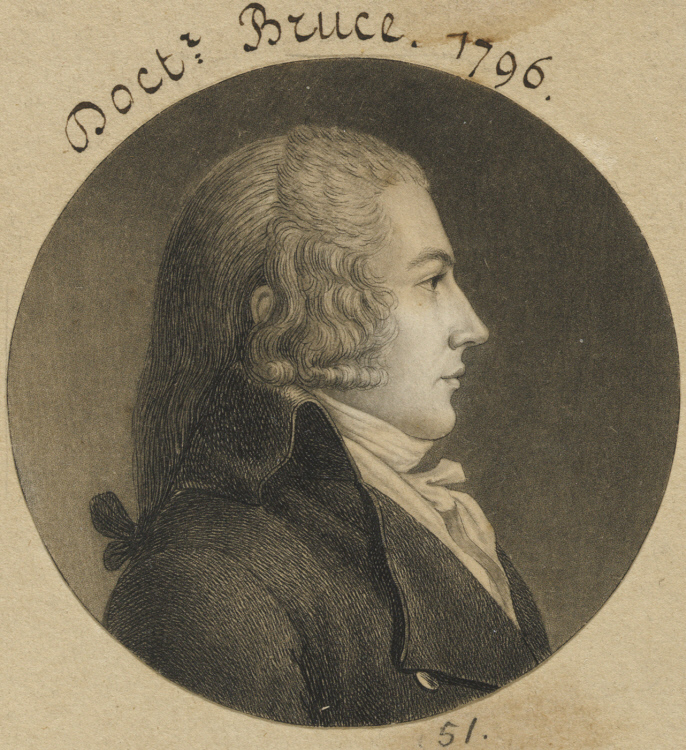
- Born: February 1777; New York City
- Died: February 22, 1818 (aged 40–41); New York City
- Alma mater: University of Edinburgh Medical School; Columbia College
- Occupation: Medical doctor; mineralogist
- Employer: Columbia University College of Physicians and Surgeons; Rutgers University

Archibald Bruce (February 1777 – February 22, 1818) was an American physician and mineralogist.

== Biography ==
Bruce was born in New York City in February 1777 and graduated from Columbia College in 1795 with a Bachelor of Arts degree. His father, William Bruce, head of the medical department of the British army at New York, on being ordered to the West Indies, specially directed that his son should not be brought up to the medical profession. From the medical lectures of Nicholas Romayne, the teachings of Dr. Hosack, and attendance on the courses of medical instruction of Columbia, he attained a knowledge of the science. He went to Europe in 1798, received an M.D. from the University of Edinburgh in 1800, and, in a tour of two years in France, Switzerland, and Italy, collected a mineralogical cabinet of great value. He married in London, and in the summer of 1803, returned to New York city and began practice. In 1807, he was appointed professor of materia medica and mineralogy in the College of Physicians and Surgeons, being the first to fill such a chair in the United States. On the reorganization of the college in 1811, he was superseded on account of some disagreement with the management, and after 1812, filled the same chair in Queen's, now Rutgers, College, New Jersey. He projected the American Mineralogical Journal in 1810, and edited it until 1814. His chemical analysis "of native magnesia from New Jersey" made known to science the mineral now called after him, Brucite. He also detected and correctly analyzed the zincite of Sussex County, New Jersey, and published a valuable paper "On the Ores of Titanium occurring within the United States." Dr. Bruce was one of the original members of the New York Historical Society, and at the time of his death, was a member of many learned societies both in this country and in Europe. He died in New York from apoplexy on February 22, 1818.
