= Saint symbolism =

Attribute identifying a saint in artworks

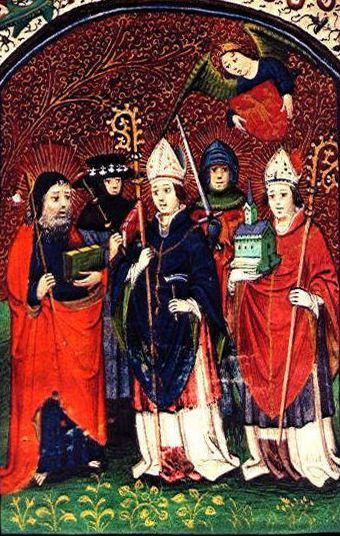
Dutch Book of Prayers from the mid-fifteenth century showing a group of five saints, with their emblems: Saint James the Great (wearing a pilgrim's hat); Saint Joseph; Saint Ghislain (holding a church); Saint Eligius (bishop with a crosier, holding a hammer); Saint Hermes (with the armor and the sword)

Symbolism of Christian saints has been used from the very beginnings of the religion. Each saint is said to have led an exemplary life and symbols have been used to tell these stories throughout the history of the Church. A number of Christian saints are traditionally represented by a symbol or iconic motif associated with their life, termed an attribute or emblem, in order to identify them. The study of these forms part of iconography in art history. They were particularly used so that the illiterate could recognize a scene, and to give each of the Saints something of a personality in art. They are often carried in the hand by the Saint.

Attributes often vary with either time or geography, especially between Eastern Christianity and the West. Orthodox images more often contained inscriptions with the names of saints, so the Eastern repertoire of attributes is generally smaller than the Western.^{[c]} Many of the most prominent saints, like Saint Peter and Saint John the Evangelist can also be recognised by a distinctive facial type. Some attributes are general, such as the martyr's palm. The use of a symbol in a work of art depicting a Saint reminds people who is being shown and of their story. The following is a list of some of these attributes.

== Four Evangelists ==
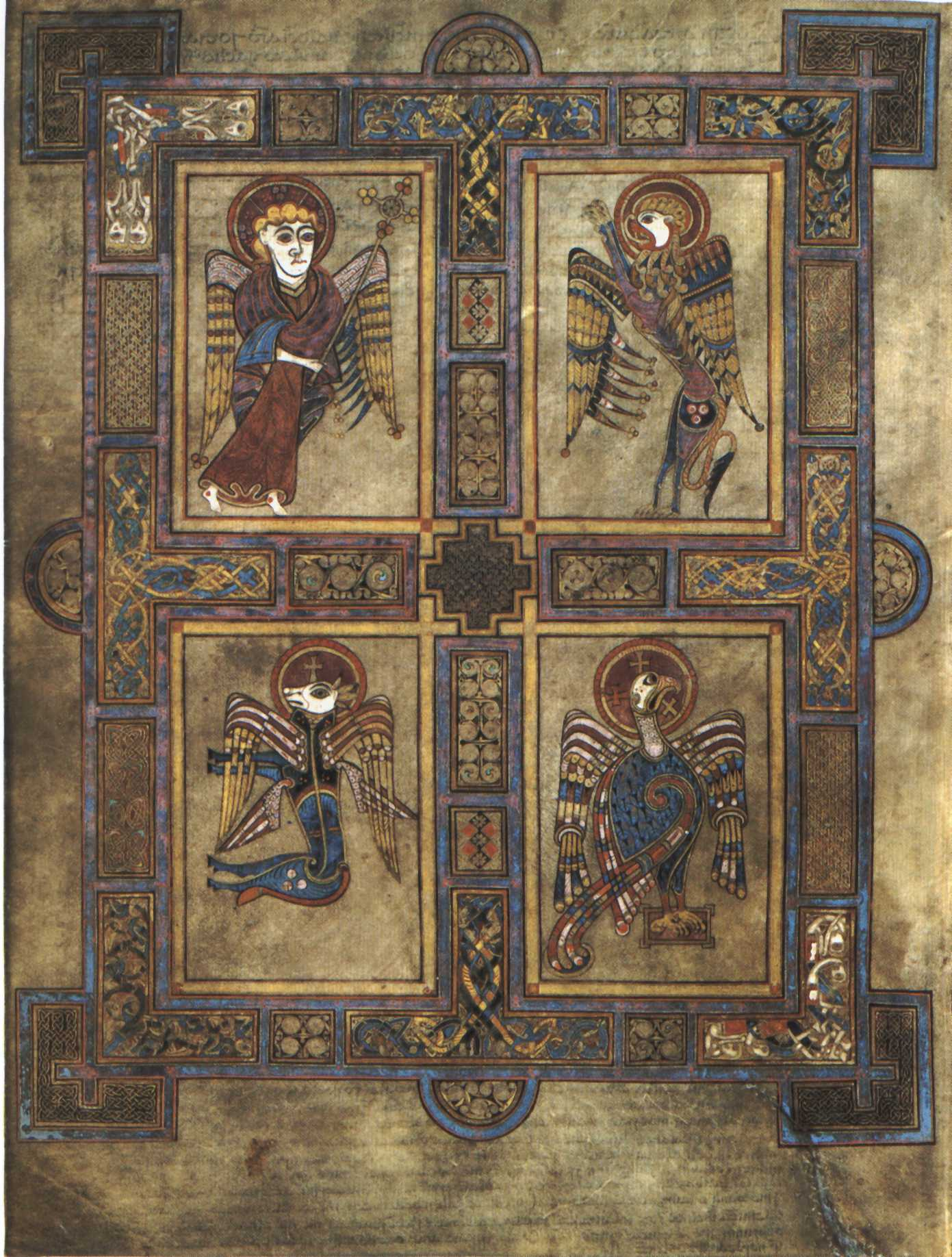
The symbols of the four Evangelists are here depicted in the Book of Kells. The winged man, lion, eagle and bull symbolize, clockwise from top left, Matthew, Mark, John, and Luke.

Saint	Symbol
Matthew	winged man or angel
Mark	winged lion
Luke	winged bull
John	eagle

== The Apostles ==
Depictions of The Apostles
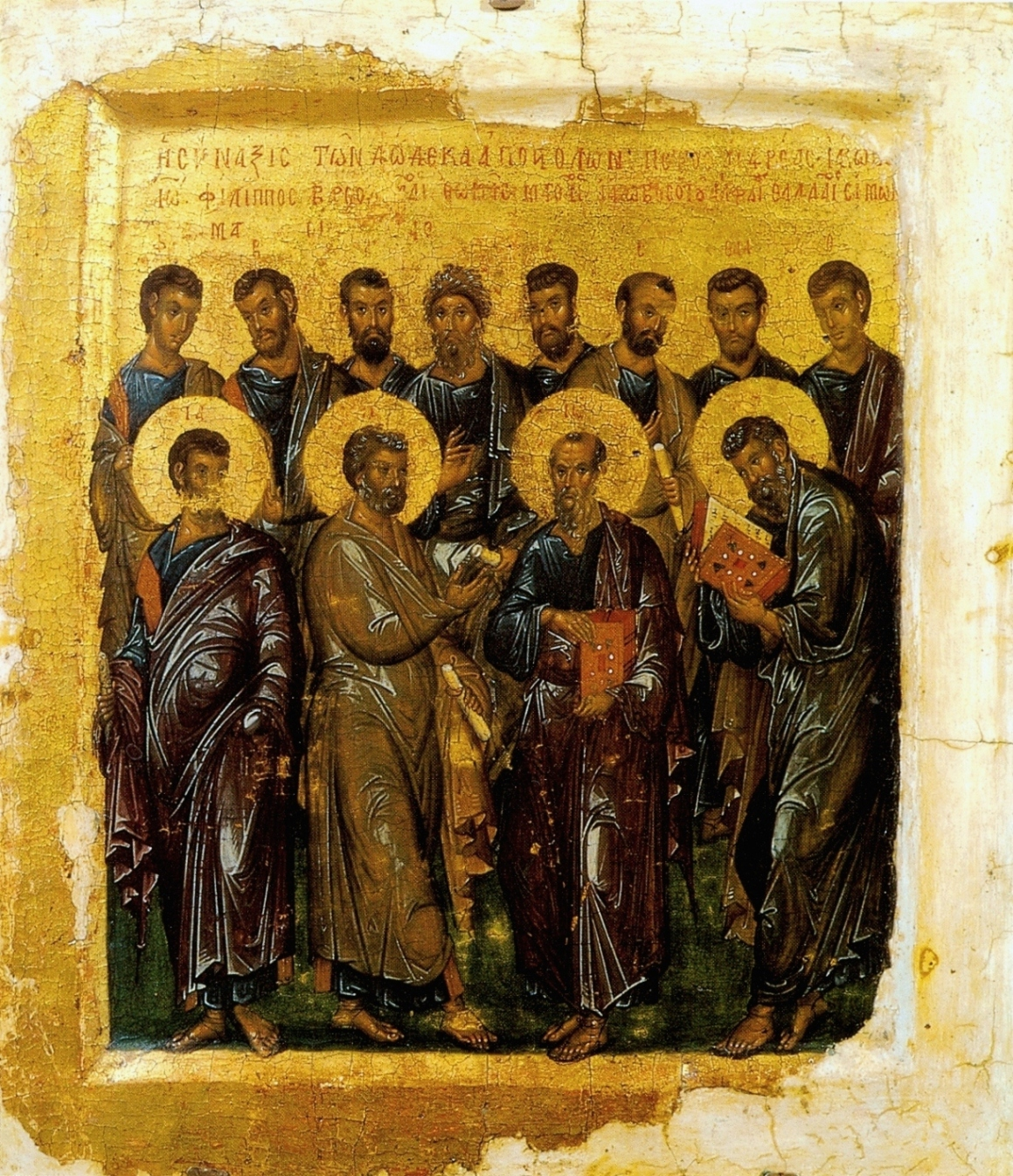
The Synaxis of the Twelve Apostles. Russian, 14th century, Moscow Museum.

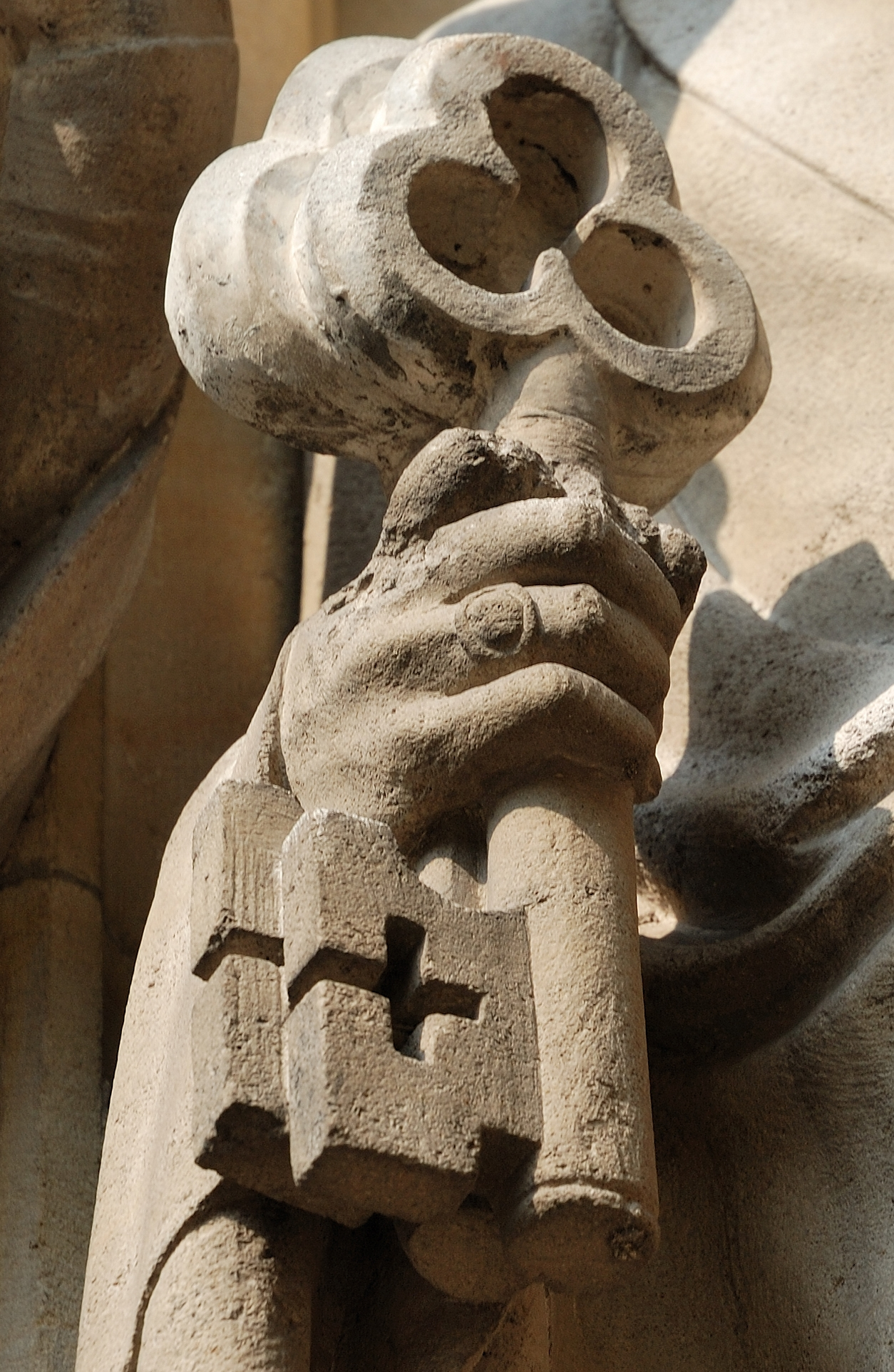
The key as symbol of St. Peter

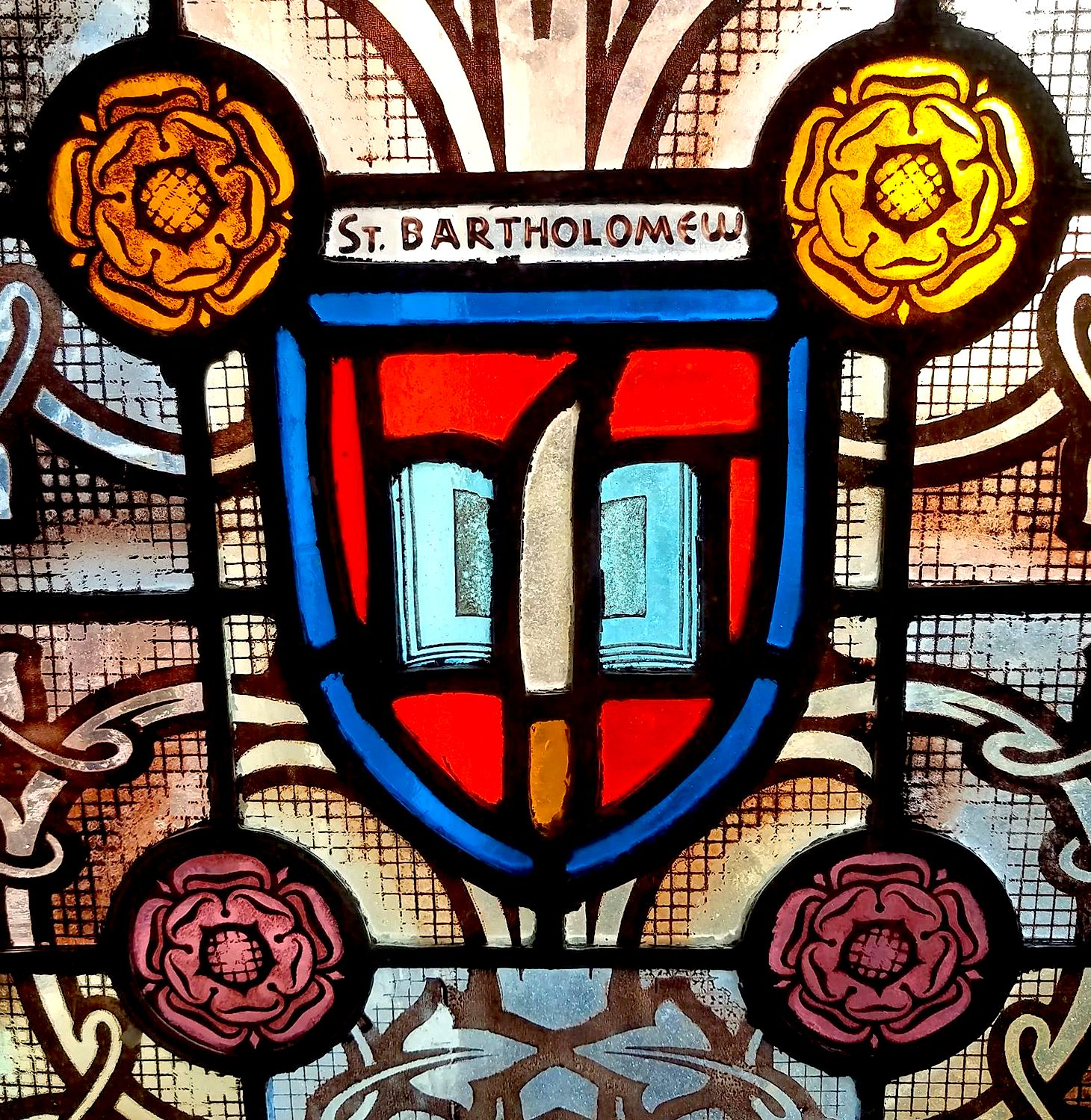
Stained glass window showing flaying knife, symbol of St. Bartholomew

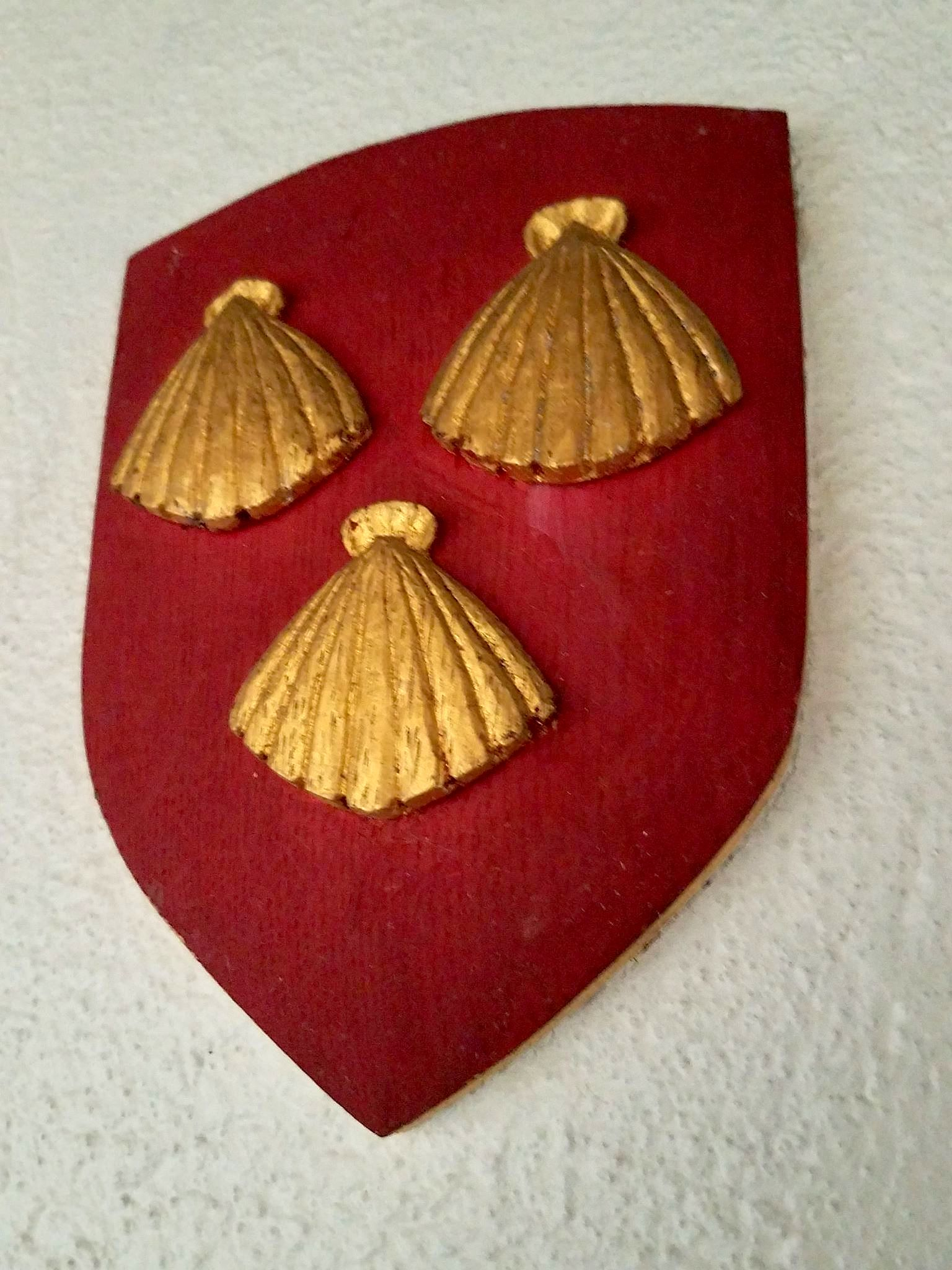
Scallop Shells, St. James the Great

Apostle	Symbol
Andrew the Apostle	St. Andrew's cross,^{[a]} discalced, with fish or a rope
Bartholomew the Apostle	knife, bears his own skin in hand^{[a]}
James, son of Zebedee	pilgrim's staff, scallop shell, key, sword, pilgrim's hat, astride a white charger, Cross of Saint James^{[a]}
James, son of Alphaeus/James the Just	square rule, halberd, club, saw^{[a]}
John	evangelistary, a serpent in a chalice, cauldron, eagle^{[a]}
Jude	sword, square rule, club, ship^{[a]}
Judas Iscariot	thirty pieces of silver^{[a]}
Matthew	angel, evangelistary^{[a]}
Peter	Keys of Heaven, boat, fish, rooster, pallium, papal vestments; crucified head downwards on an inverted cross, holding a book or scroll, with a bushy beard and hair.^{[a]}
Philip	column; holding a basket of loaves and a Tau Cross^{[a]}
Simon	boat; cross and saw; fish (or two fishes); lance; being sawn in two longitudinally; oar^{[a]}
Thomas	placing his finger in the side of Christ, axe, spear, carpentry tools ^{[a]}

== Mary, mother of Jesus ==
Depictions of Mary, mother of Jesus
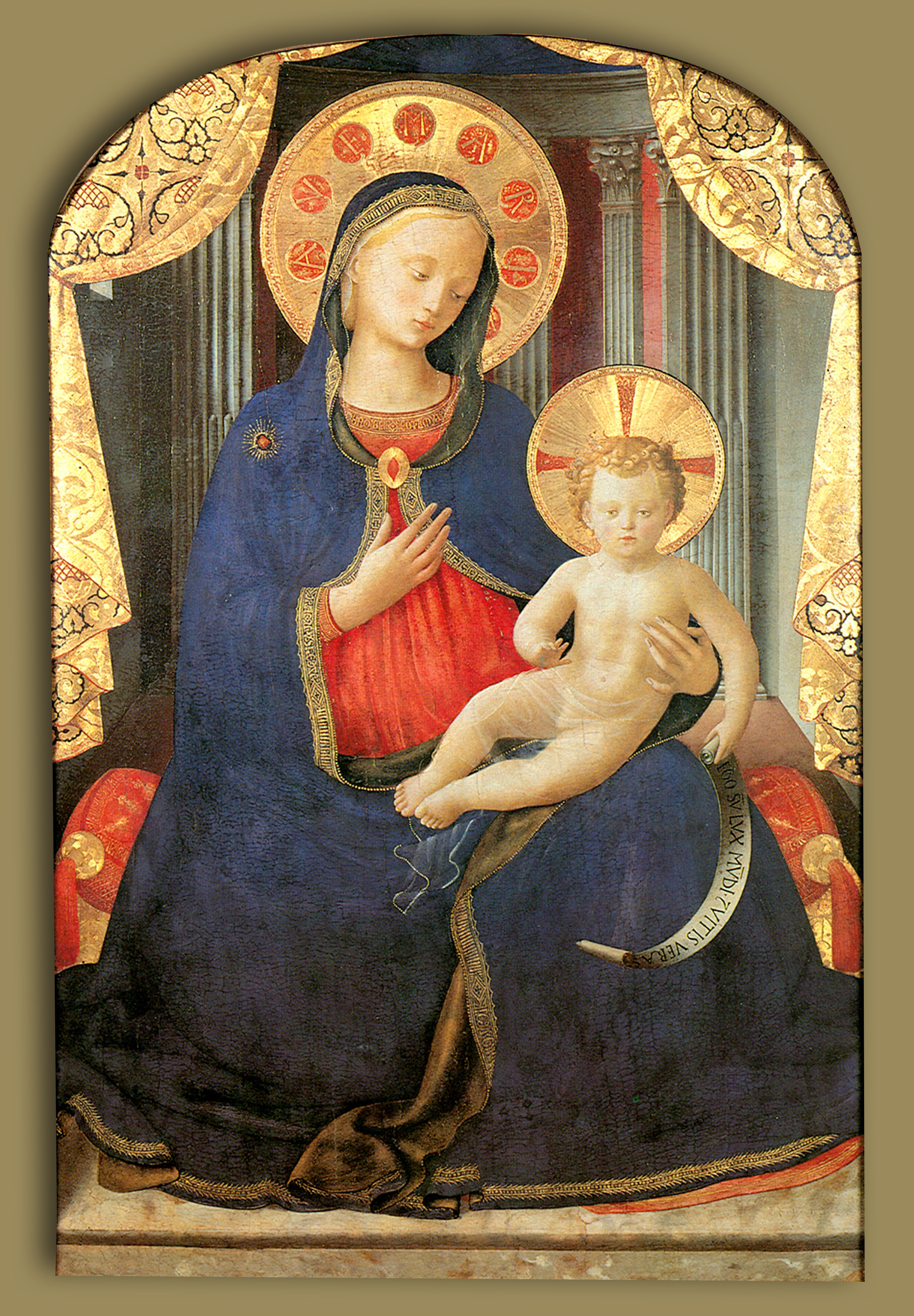
A traditional depiction of Mary, by Fra Angelico, wearing a blue mantle

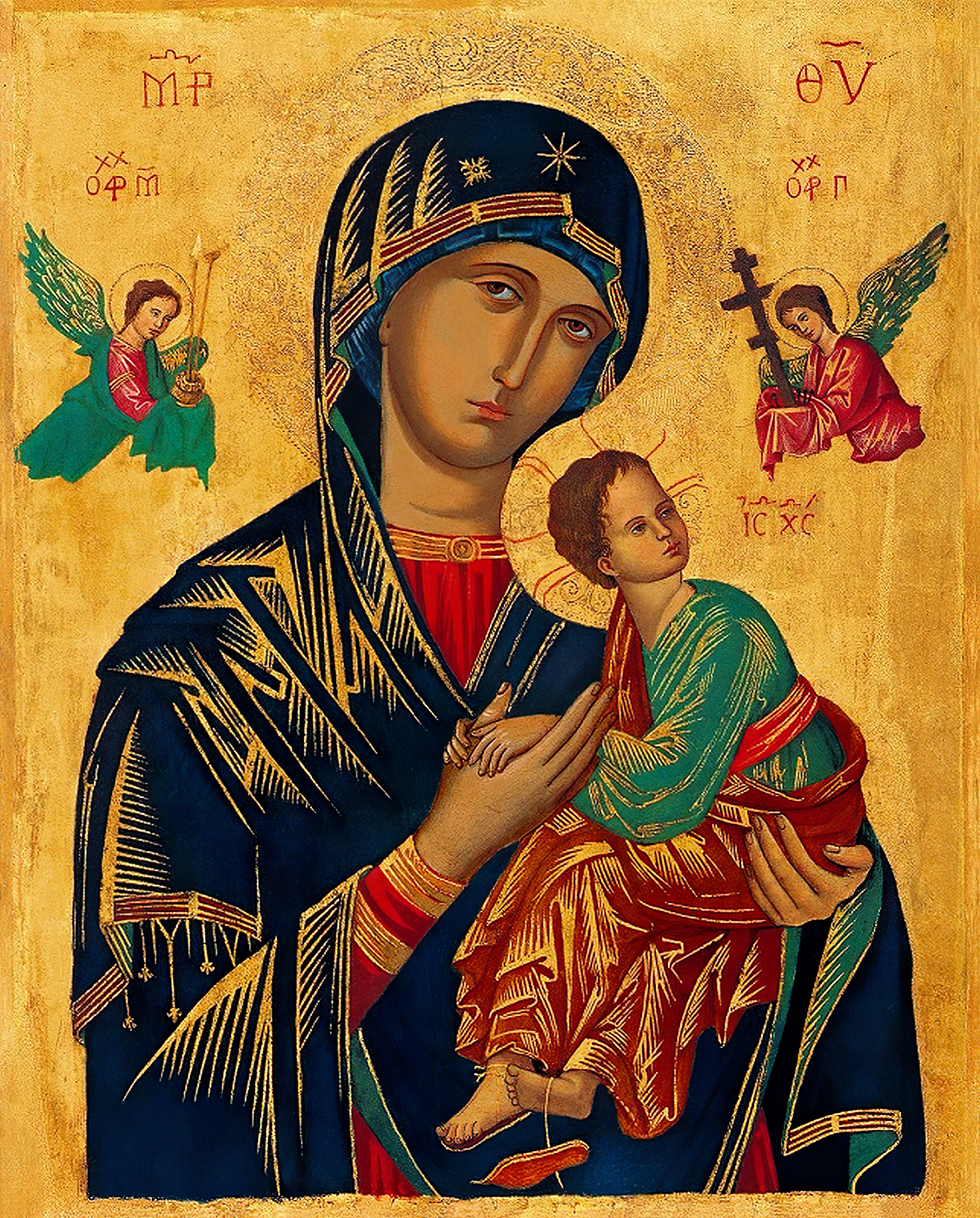
Our Lady of Perpetual Help

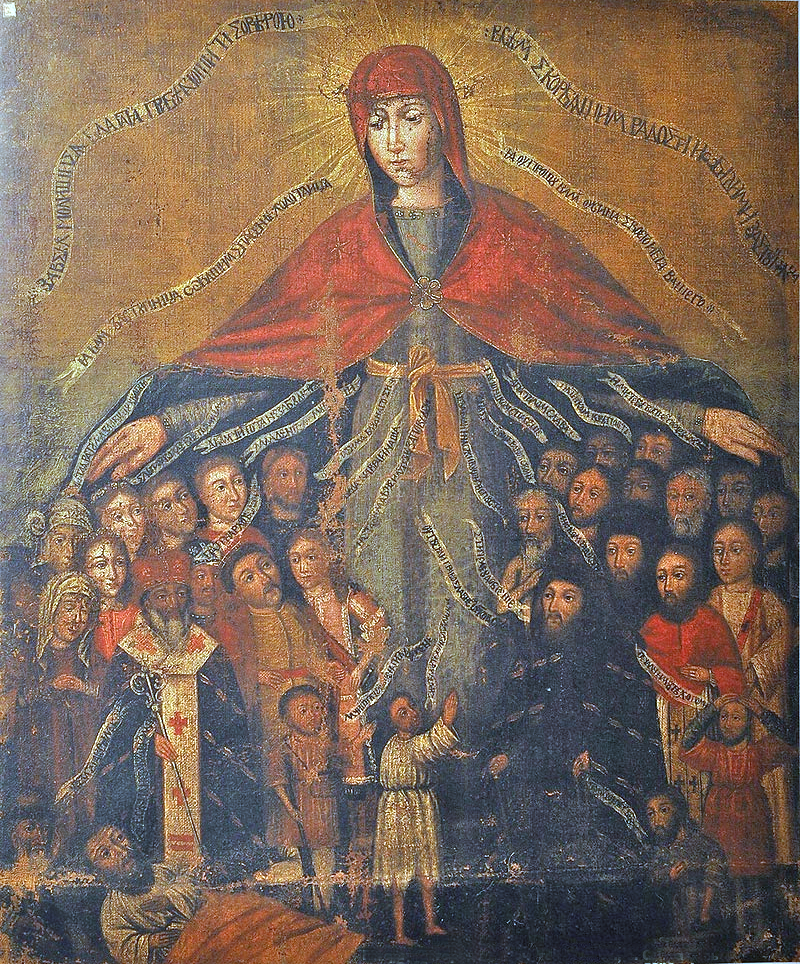
Virgin of Mercy

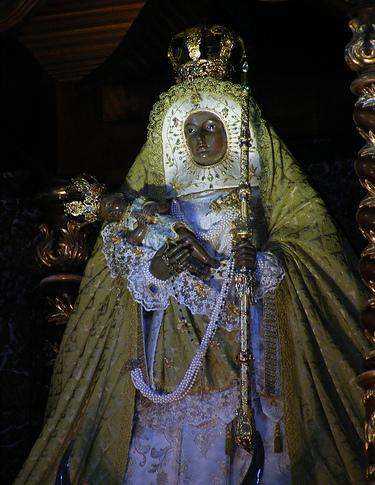
Our Lady of Candelaria

Mary is often portrayed wearing blue. Her attributes include amongst many others a mantle (often in blue or very large to cover the faithful), crown of 12 stars, serpent, sun and/or moon, heart pierced by sword, Madonna lily, roses, and rosary beads.

Title	Symbol
Black Madonna of Częstochowa	Black Madonna in Hodegetria form, Infant Jesus, fleur-de-lis robes, slashes on right cheek
Immaculate Heart of Mary	Burning bloodied heart, pierced with a sword, banded with roses, and lily flowers
Our Lady of Perpetual Help	Hodegetria with saints Michael and Gabriel holding instruments of the passion.
Our Lady of Aparecida	In traditional form of Immaculate Conception
Our Lady of Candelaria	Black Madonna with candle in one hand, and Infant Jesus in the other hand. Jesus carries a small bird in his hands.
Our Lady of Charity	Carrying the Christ child and holding a crucifix atop an inverted crescent moon, with triple cherubs, encrusted with jewels and golden crown and aureole halo, embroidered gold mantle with the Cuban flag
Our Lady the Garden Enclosed	Statue of Our Lady of Sorrows holding a white handkerchief, gold crown and jewelry, richly embroidered mantle
Our Lady of Copacabana	Blessed Virgin Mary, Inca dress and crown, Infant Jesus, straw basket, pigeons, baton, gold Quechua jewelry
Our Lady of Cotoca	white embroidered mantle, gold crown and jewelry, scapuler
Our Lady of Fátima	dressed in white, giving out rays of clear and intense light
Our Lady of Good Counsel	with the Infant Jesus, in their touching halo appear the words SS. Mater Boni consilii, ora pro nobis Jesum filium tuum
Our Lady of Guadalupe	eyes downcast, hands clasped in prayer, clothed in a pink tunic robe covered by a cerulean mantle with a black sash, emblazoned with eight-point stars; eclipsing a blazing sun while standing atop a darkened crescent moon, a cherubic angel carrying her train
Our Lady of Humility	Mary seated low to the ground, usually holding the baby Jesus
Our Lady of Itatí	in prayer, with blue embroidered mantle, solar crown, veil
Our Lady of Lebanon	Blessed Virgin Mary with outstretched hands, bronze crown
Our Lady of Lourdes	dressed in a flowing white robe, with a blue sash around her waist
Our Lady of Luján	in prayer, with a golden crown, embroidered blue mantle over white robe, sliver of moon
Our Lady of Navigators	held by angels, with mantle, jewelry, crown, halo of stars; the Infant Jesus is holding an anchor
Our Lady of Peace	Virgin MaryInfant Jesus; she holds an olive branch and dove
Our Lady of Peace and Good Voyage	dark complexion, enlarged iris, unbound hair
Our Lady of Peñafrancia	halo with Circle of 12 stars, Crown, Holy Child, Mantum
Our Lady of Piat	dark complexion, the Child Jesus, rosary, crown, flowers
Our Lady of San Juan de los Lagos	in prayer, with golden crown, white gown, blue mantle, silver banner held by angels
Our Lady of Sorrows	in mournful state, tears, bleeding heart pierced by seven swords ^{[b]}
Our Lady of the Most Holy Rosary, Queen of the Caracol	with the Infant Jesus in a royal regalia, rosary and baton
Our Lady of the Rosary of Chiquinquirá	standing on a crescent moon, blue cloak, white veil, holding the Infant Jesus. With bird, rosary, scepter, accompanied by Saints Anthony of Padua and Andrew
Our Lady of the Rosary	with the Infant Jesus, crown, rosary
Our Lady of the Visitation of Guibang	ivory statue
Our Lady of Vendôme	with the Infant Jesus
Our Mother of Sheshan	standing on top a Chinese dragon, with the Infant Jesus in cruciform gesture
Rosa Mystica	with a rose
Queen of Heaven	with a crown of stars, flowers^{[a]}
Virgen de los Remedios de Pampanga	The Blessed Virgin Mary encrusted with jewels, golden crown, aureole and moon.
Virgen del Valle	Mary in a white dress
Virgin of Mercy	sheltering people under her mantle
Virgin of Miracles	Gothic alabaster carving of Mary with a baby
Virgin of Montserrat	Madonna and child seated in the Throne of Wisdom pose
Virgin of the Thirty-Three	assumed into heaven, white robe, blue cloak, golden bejeweled crown, sliver of moon held by cherubs
Our Lady of Mount Carmel	dressed in the colors of the Carmelite habit, wearing the mantle of the Carmelite habit, holding a brown scapular, sometimes handing it to Saint Simon Stock

== Saints listed by name ==
Saints (A–H)

Saints (I–P)

Saints (Q–Z)

== See also ==
- Christian symbolism
- Arma Christi
- Animals in Christian art
- Plants in Christian iconography
