= Christian art =

Art with subjects from Christianity

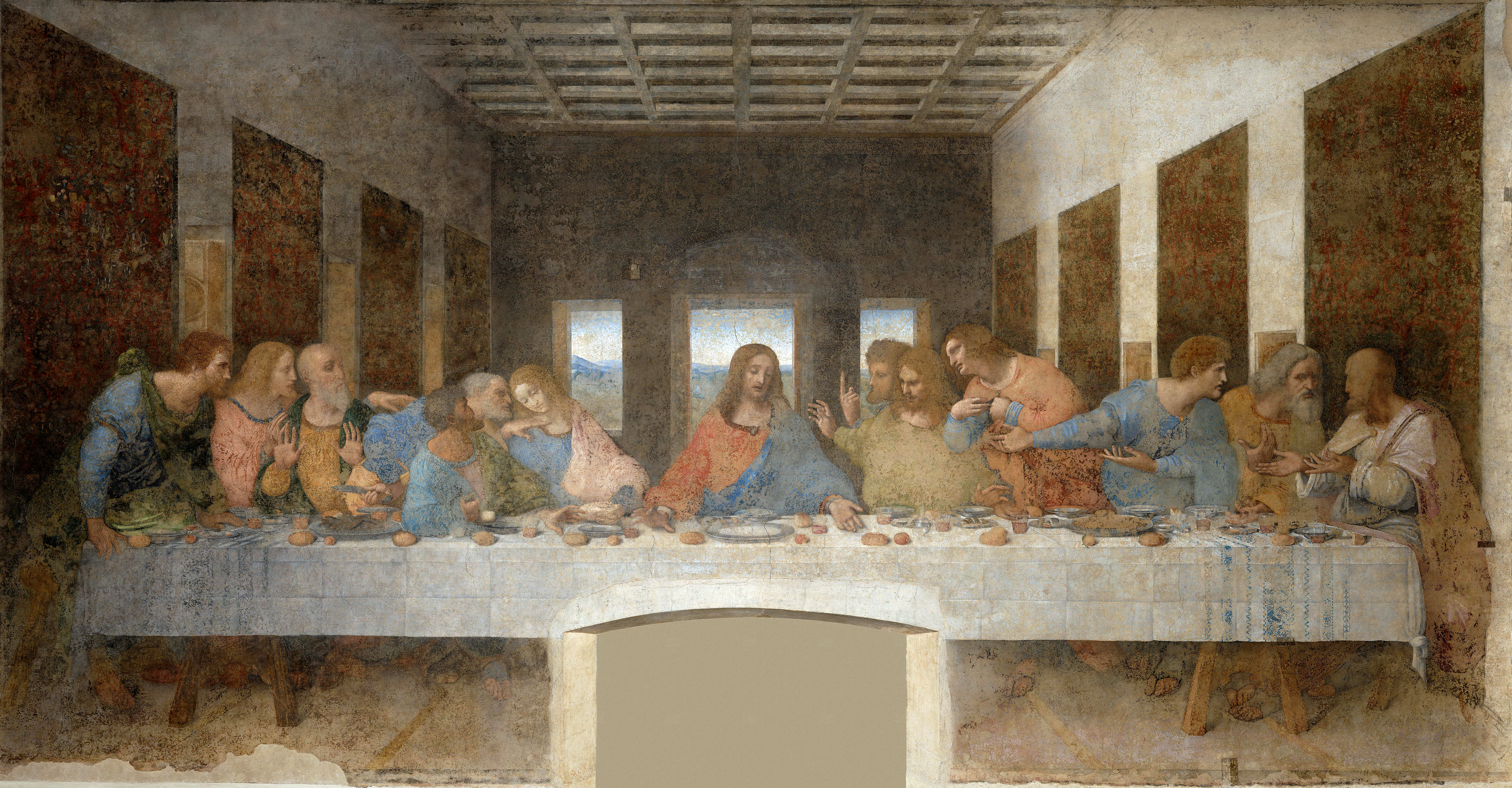
Leonardo da Vinci's The Last Supper (1498).

Christian art is sacred art which uses subjects, themes, and imagery from Christianity. Most Christian groups use or have used art to some extent, including early Christian art and architecture and Christian media.

Images of Jesus and narrative scenes from the Life of Christ are the most common subjects, and scenes from the Old Testament play a part in the art of most denominations. Images of the Virgin Mary and saints are common in certain denominations of Christianity, including Catholicism, Oriental Orthodoxy, Eastern Orthodoxy, and Evangelical Lutheranism. They are less common in other branches of the faith, such as Reformed Christianity.

Christianity makes far wider use of images than related religions, in which figurative representations are forbidden, such as Islam and Judaism. However, there are some that have promoted aniconism in Christianity, and there have been periods of iconoclasm within Christianity.

== History ==
=== Beginnings ===
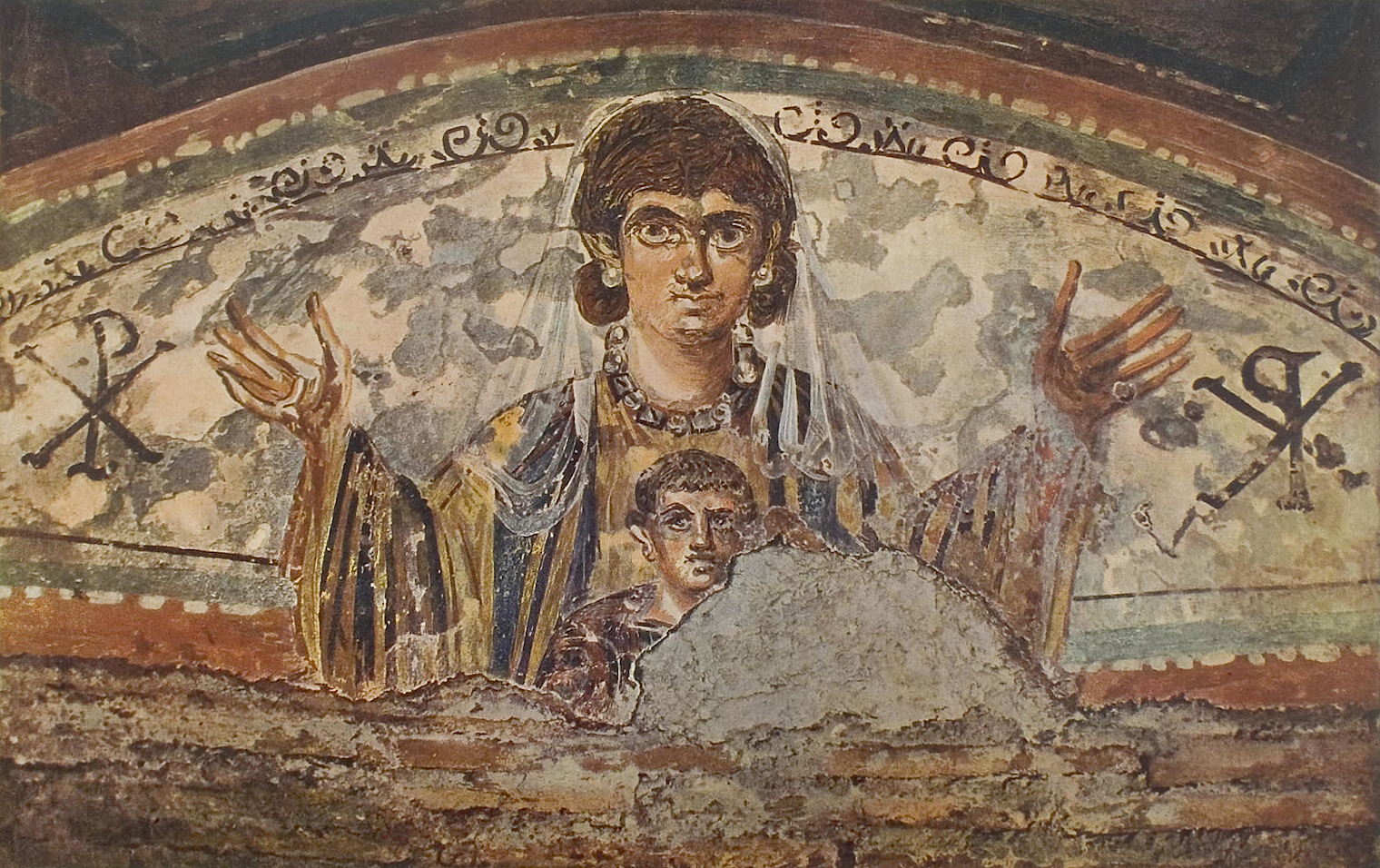
Virgin and Child. Wall painting from the early catacombs, Rome, 4th century.

Early Christian art survives from dates near the origins of Christianity, although many early Christians associated figurative art with pagan religion, and were suspicious or hostile towards it. Over time, this lessened. But large free-standing sculpture, the medium for the most prominent pagan images, continued to be distrusted and largely shunned for some centuries, and virtually up to the present day in the Orthodox world. The oldest Christian sculptures are small reliefs from Roman sarcophagi, dating to the beginning of the 2nd century. The largest groups of Early Christian paintings come from the tombs in the Catacombs of Rome, and show the evolution of the depiction of Jesus, a process not complete until the 6th century, since when the conventional appearance of Jesus in art has remained remarkably consistent.

Until the adoption of Christianity by Constantine Christian art derived its style and much of its iconography from popular Roman art, but from this point grand Christian buildings built under imperial patronage brought a need for Christian versions of Roman elite and official art, of which mosaics in churches in Rome are the most prominent surviving examples. Christian art was caught up in, but did not originate, the shift in style from the classical tradition inherited from Ancient Greek art to a less realist and otherworldly hieratic style, the start of gothic art.

=== Middle Ages ===
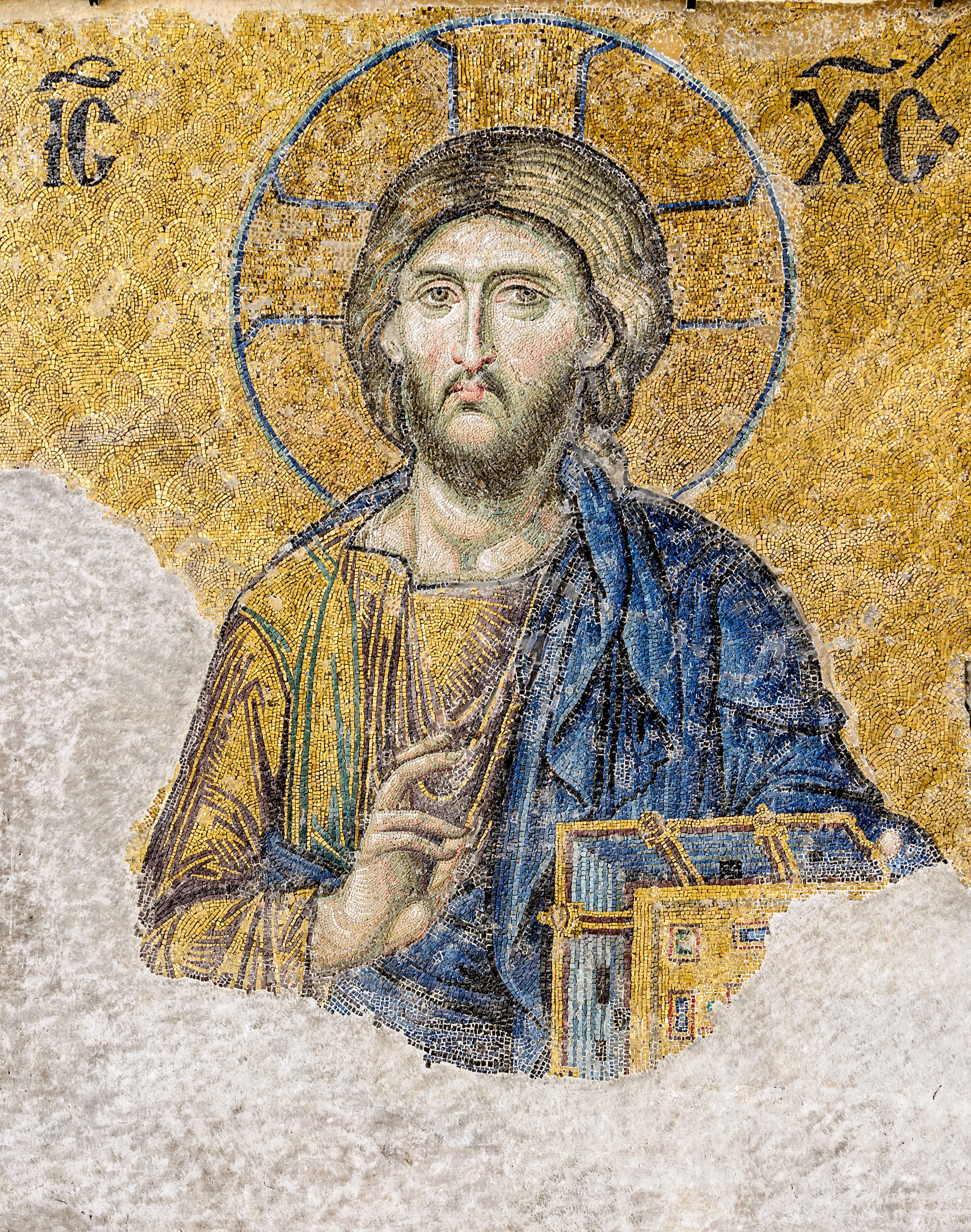
Late 13th-century Byzantine mosaics of the Hagia Sophia showing the image of Christ Pantocrator.

Much of the art surviving from Europe after the fall of the Western Roman Empire is Christian art, although this is in large part because the continuity of church ownership has preserved church art better than secular works. While the Western Roman Empire's political structure essentially collapsed after the fall of Rome, its religious hierarchy, what is today the modern-day Roman Catholic Church commissioned and funded production of religious art imagery.

While the Byzantine Empire continued to focus on the creation of Christian art, in Denmark and Norway, the Vikings would see a surge of Christianity. Christianity spread to the Vikings through pillaging, missionaries, political pressure, and trading with other peoples of Europe. Rune stones with Christian imagery were used as grave markings, promotion, or a demonstration of faith. King Harold Bluetooth's rune stone, also known as The Great Jelling Rune Stone, is credited with marking the shift to Christianity in the Viking Era. Gravestones would also display prominent Christian imagery. The Rathdown Stones are the most well-known of these Viking gravestones: granite stones with tablet or cross-like designs mixed with traditional Viking styling. Driftwood crosses have been found around other churches and graveyards.

Named for their strong foundational pillars, Stave Churches were another popular display of Christian Viking art. These churches displayed engravings of Christian and Nordic beliefs, with animal-like depictions appearing on walls and entrances. The cross is also a prominent image in Christian Viking imagery. Vikings would be marked with a cross as a sign that they had been baptized abroad or during a venture. Viking Nordic myths and symbolism can be seen engraved into stone and wooden crosses. German and English influence can be found in some distinct examples of these crosses, with choices to use Doric capital ends, believed to have spread throughout Scandinavia in the 12th and 13th century.

The Orthodox Church of Constantinople, which enjoyed greater stability within the surviving Eastern Empire was key in producing imagery there and glorifying Christianity. They commissioned many shrines to be built in Constantinople’s honor and also lots of well-decorated churches. These tended to have extravagant stained glass and paintings covering the walls and ceilings. Also, relief sculptures were made which were etched into the sides of buildings and churches. Hagia Sophia, the world's largest cathedral during the 15th century, was decorated almost entirely using mosaics as a way to honor God. Following the fall of Constantinople, it was converted into a mosque, but it's wonderous art remained. As a stable Western European society emerged during the Middle Ages, the Catholic Church led the way in terms of art, using its resources to commission paintings and sculptures.

During the development of Christian art in the Byzantine Empire (see Byzantine art), a more abstract aesthetic replaced the naturalism previously established in Hellenistic art. This new style was hieratic, meaning its primary purpose was to convey religious meaning rather than accurately render objects and people. Realistic perspective, proportions, light and colour were ignored in favour of geometric simplification of forms, reverse perspective and standardized conventions to portray individuals and events. The controversy over the use of graven images, the interpretation of the Second Commandment, and the crisis of Byzantine Iconoclasm led to a standardization of religious imagery within the Eastern Orthodoxy.

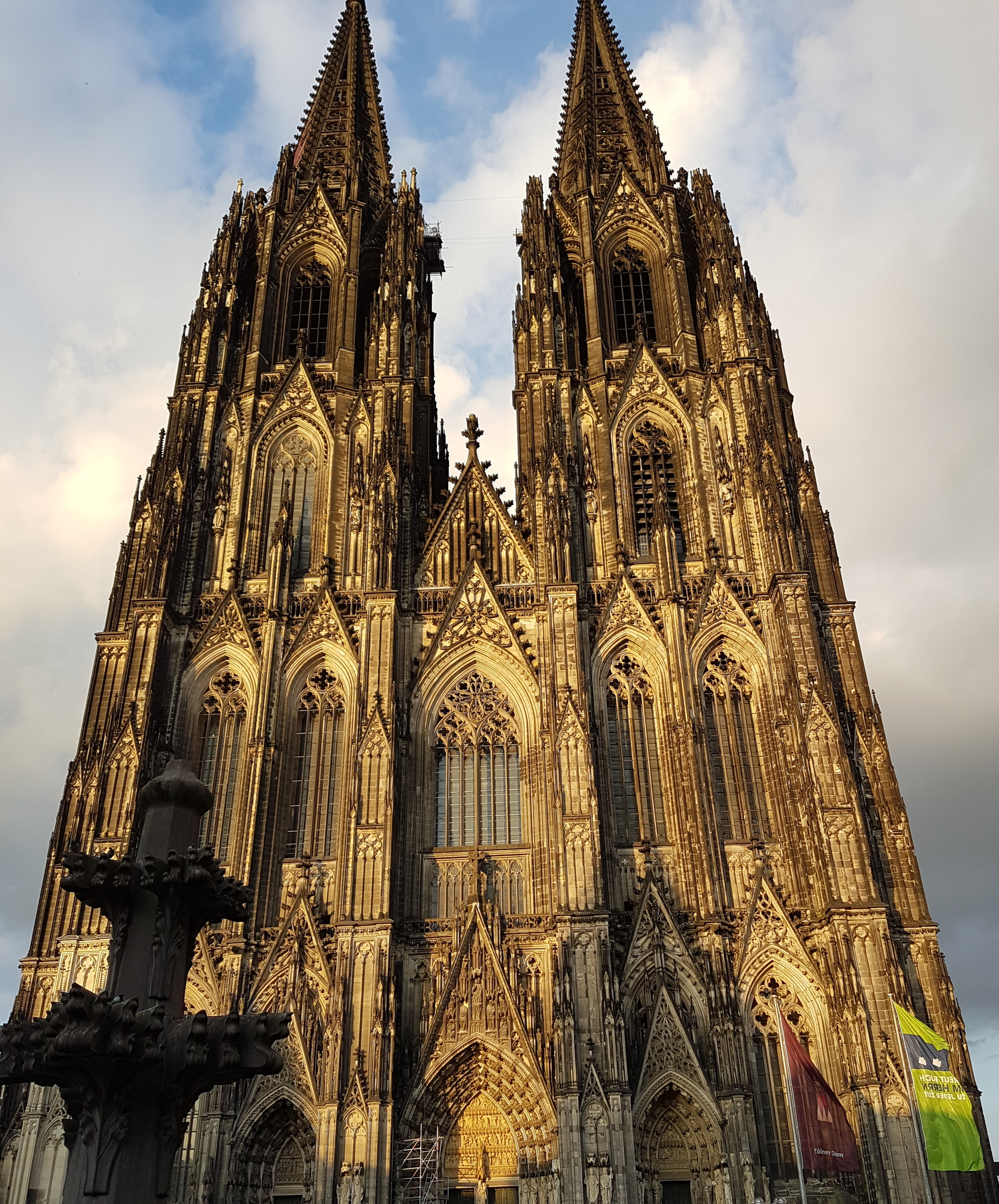
Cologne Cathedral in 2022

Similar to the Vikings, wood and carvings are also used in Germanic Christian art in depictions of crosses and relations to the Crucifixion utilized in different areas such as churches and cathedrals. The Cologne Cathedral is a notable church located in Cologne, Germany, resting upon ruins of buildings from the Romantic and Frankish periods. Although the structure would begin construction in 1248 under archbishop Conrad von Hostaden, the monument would not be completed until the 1880s.

In the late Medieval period, the East made steps in Christian art. In the Mediterranean area, there was a shift from Islamic to Christian art. With 86 examples of muqarnaṣ displayed around the Mediterranean, with the majority (78) being displayed in Christian kingdoms in the Iberian Peninsula. This is explained through the increased political power associated with muqarnas, being placed in important buildings such as chapels. Recently discovered in Syria and Egypt, other examples of medieval Christian art have been explored, such as the Mar Musa Monastery with different examples of medieval Christian art, like wall paintings. Because of the nature of traveling painters and artists, these paintings often had Greek lettering and script

=== Renaissance and early modern period ===
The fall of Constantinople in 1453 brought an end to the highest quality Byzantine art, produced in the Imperial workshops there. Orthodox art, known as icons regardless of the medium, has otherwise continued with relatively little change in subject and style up to the present day, with Russia gradually becoming the leading centre of production.

In the West, the Renaissance saw an increase in monumental secular works, although Christian art continued to be commissioned in great quantities by churches, clergy and by the aristocracy. The Reformation had a huge impact on Christian art; Martin Luther in Germany allowed and encouraged the display of a more limited range of religious imagery in churches, seeing the Evangelical Lutheran Church as a continuation of the "ancient, apostolic church". Lutheran altarpieces like the 1565 Last Supper by the younger Cranach were produced in Germany, especially by Luther's friend Lucas Cranach, to replace Catholic ones, often containing portraits of leading reformers as the apostles or other protagonists, but retaining the traditional depiction of Jesus. As such, "Lutheran worship became a complex ritual choreography set in a richly furnished church interior." Lutherans proudly employed the use of the crucifix as it highlighted their high view of the Theology of the Cross. Thus, for Lutherans, "the Reformation renewed rather than removed the religious image." On the other hand, Christians from a Reformed background were generally iconoclastic, destroying existing religious imagery and usually only creating more in the form of book illustrations.

Artists were commissioned to produce more secular genres like portraits, landscape paintings and because of the revival of Neoplatonism, subjects from classical mythology. In Catholic countries, production of religious art continued, and increased during the Counter-Reformation, but Catholic art was brought under much tighter control by the church hierarchy than had been the case before. From the 18th century the number of religious works produced by leading artists declined sharply, though important commissions were still placed, and some artists continued to produce large bodies of religious art on their own initiative.

=== Modern period ===
As a secular, non-sectarian, universal notion of art arose in 19th-century Western Europe, ancient and Medieval Christian art began to be collected for art appreciation rather than worship, while contemporary Christian art was considered marginal. Occasionally, secular artists treated Christian themes (Bouguereau, Manet) — but only rarely was a Christian artist included in the historical canon (such as Rouault or Stanley Spencer). However many modern artists such as Eric Gill, Marc Chagall, Henri Matisse, Jacob Epstein, Elisabeth Frink and Graham Sutherland have produced well-known works of art for churches. Salvador Dalí is an artist who had also produced notable and popular artworks with Christian themes. Contemporary artists such as Makoto Fujimura have had significant influence both in sacred and secular arts. Other notable artists include Larry D. Alexander and John August Swanson. Some writers, such as Gregory Wolfe, see this as part of a rebirth of Christian humanism.

=== Popular devotional art ===
Since the advent of printing, the sale of reproductions of pious works has been a major element of popular Christian culture. In the 19th century, this included genre painters such as Mihály Munkácsy. The invention of color lithography led to broad circulation of holy cards. In the modern era, companies specializing in modern commercial Christian artists such as Thomas Blackshear and Thomas Kinkade, although widely regarded in the fine art world as kitsch, have been very successful.

== Subjects ==
Subjects often seen in Christian art include the following. See Life of Christ and Life of the Virgin for fuller lists of narrative scenes included in cycles:

- Adoration of the Magi
- Adoration of the shepherds
- Angels
- Annunciation
- Arrest of Jesus
- Ascension of Jesus
- Assumption of the Virgin Mary in Art or Dormition of the Virgin
- Baptism of Jesus
- Christ in Majesty
- Christ Pantocrator
- Coronation of the Virgin
- Crucifix
- Descent from the Cross
- Hand of God
- Holy Family
- Holy Trinity Icon
- Madonna
- Madonna and Child
- Maestà
- Nativity of Jesus
- Noli me tangere
- Passion of Jesus
- Pietà
- Resurrection appearances of Jesus
- Salvator Mundi
- Sanhedrin Trial of Jesus
- Shield of the Trinity
- Stations of the Cross
- The Last Judgment
- The Last Supper
- Tree of Jesse

=== Motifs ===
The Virgin Mary is shown spinning and weaving, appearing in artworks with a loom or knitting needles, weaving cloth over her womb, or knitting for her son. The imagery, much of it German, places the sacred narratives in the domestic realm. She is shown weaving in paintings of The Annunciation, or spinning. Although spinning was less common an example is found in some convents where nuns would spin silk, presumably to create a link between the convent community of women and the image of the Mary.

== Gallery ==
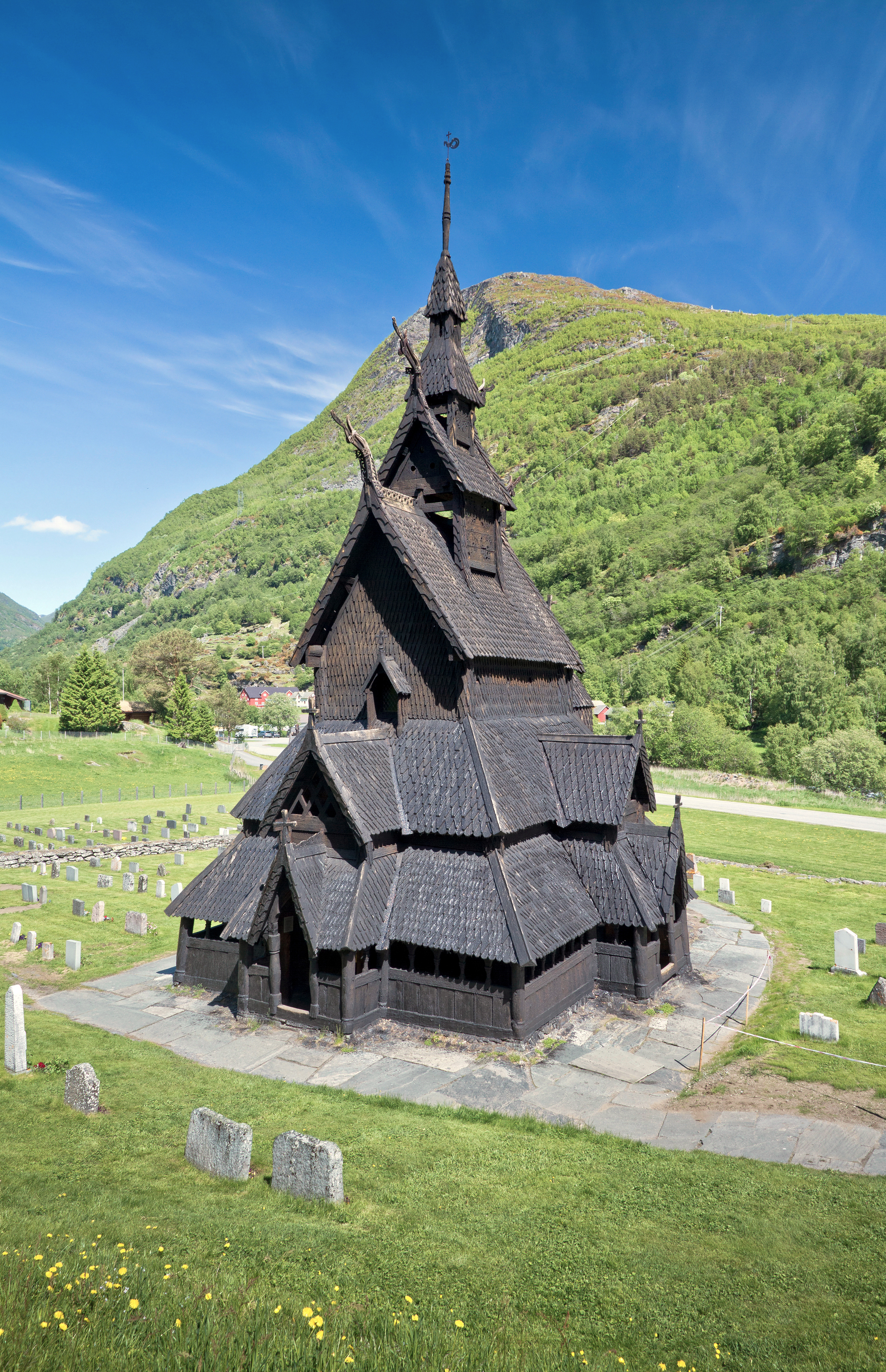
Borgund Stave Church in Lærdalen, 2013

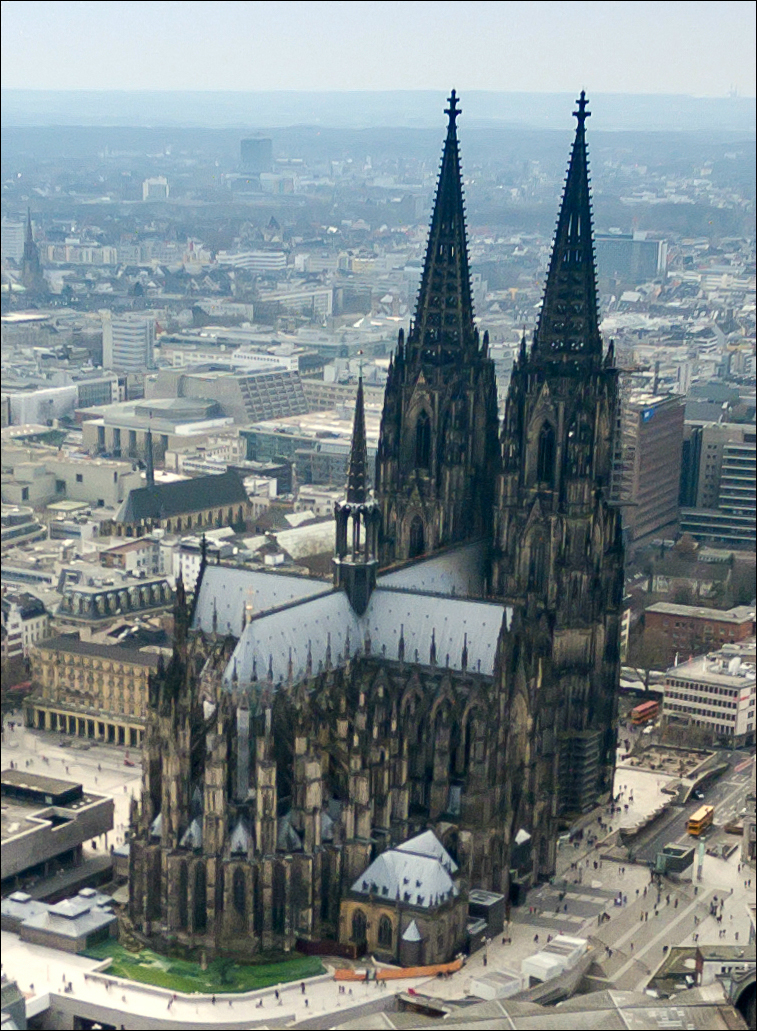
Cologne Cathedral Aerial View

A mosaic from Daphni Monastery in Greece (c. 1100), showing midwives bathing the new-born Christ.

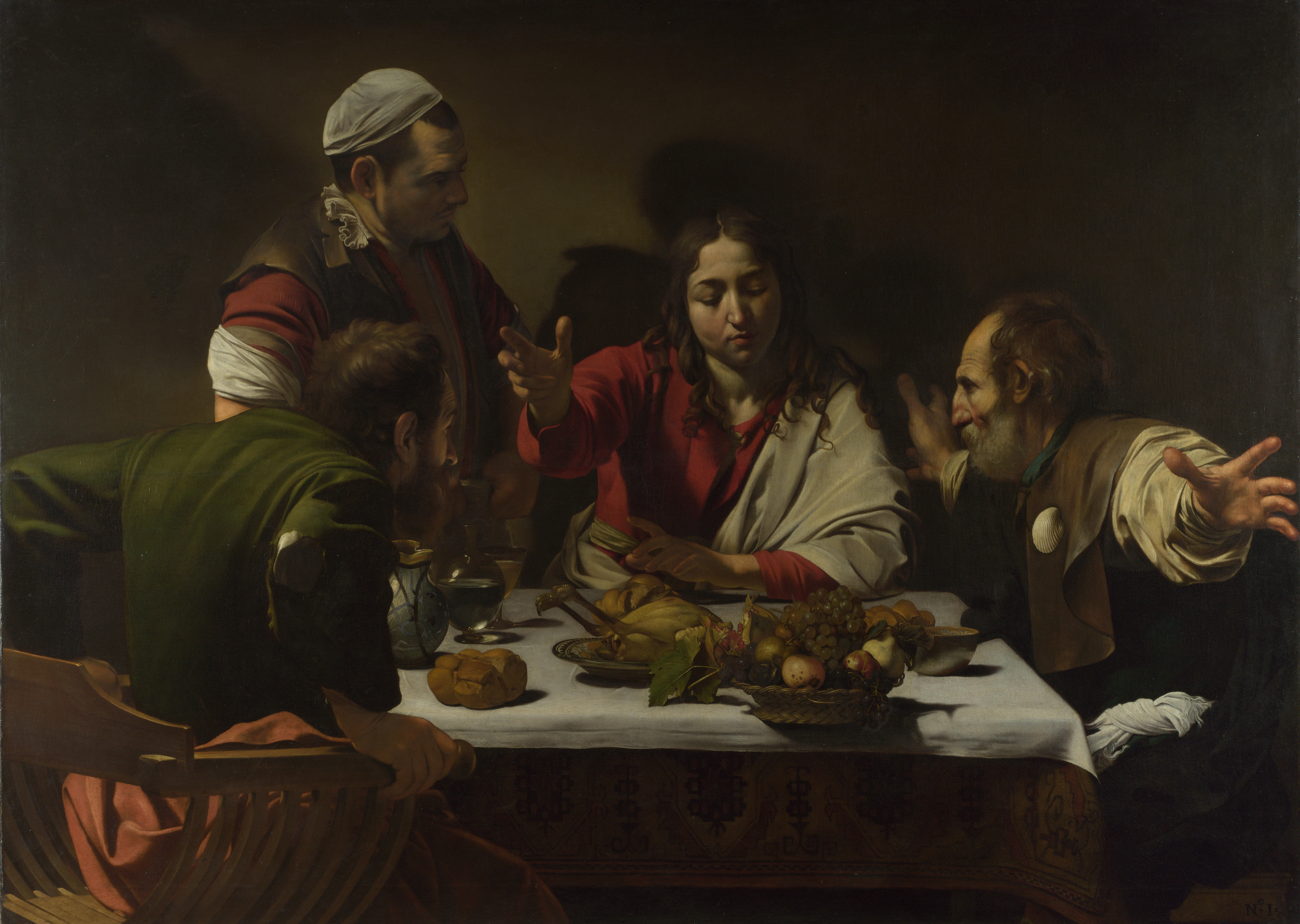
Supper at Emmaus, 1601, by Caravaggio. Oil on canvas, 139 x 195 cm. National Gallery, London

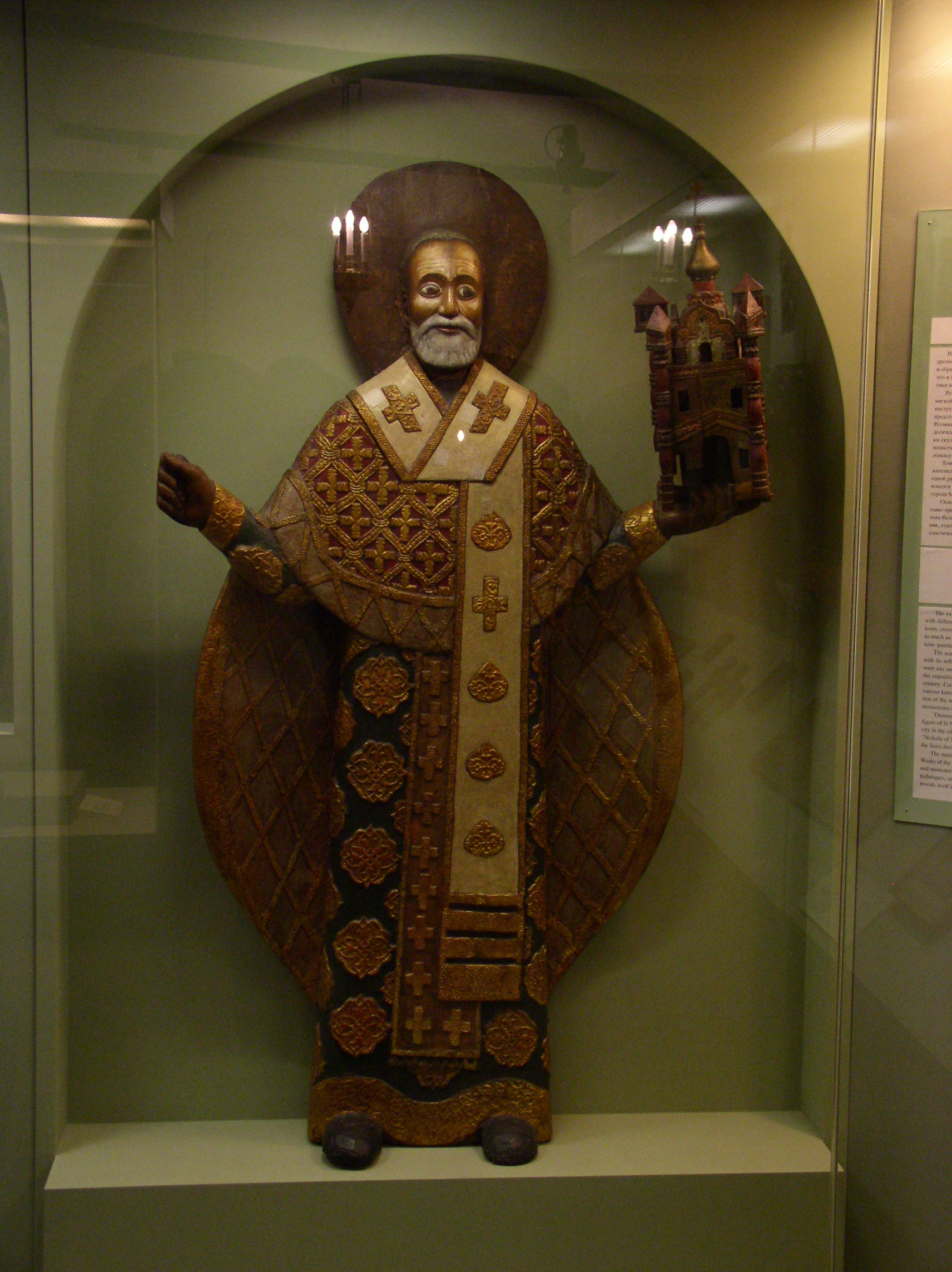
A rare sample of medieval Orthodox sculpture from Russia

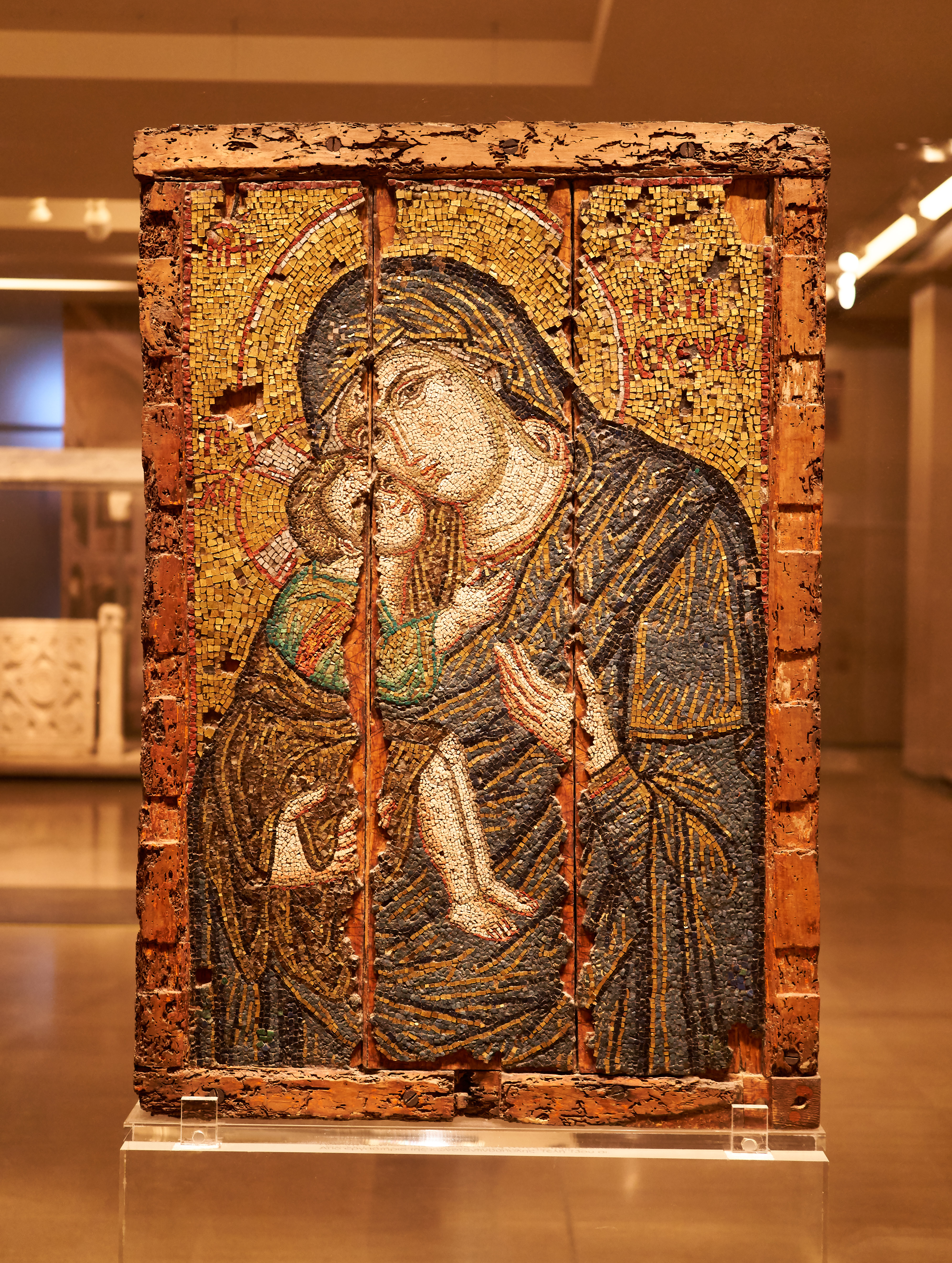
Mosaic icon with the Virgin of Tenderness at the Byzantine and Christian Museum, 2019

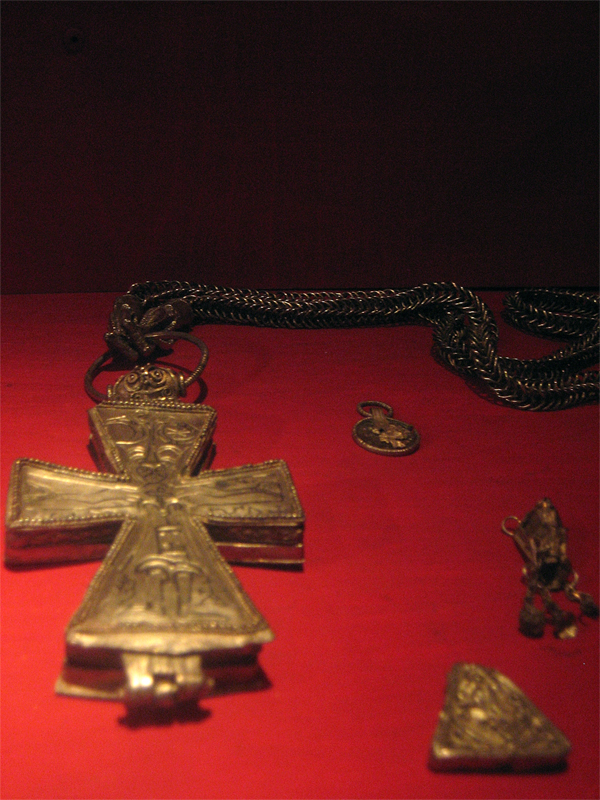
Cross on a Viking necklace (Sweden)

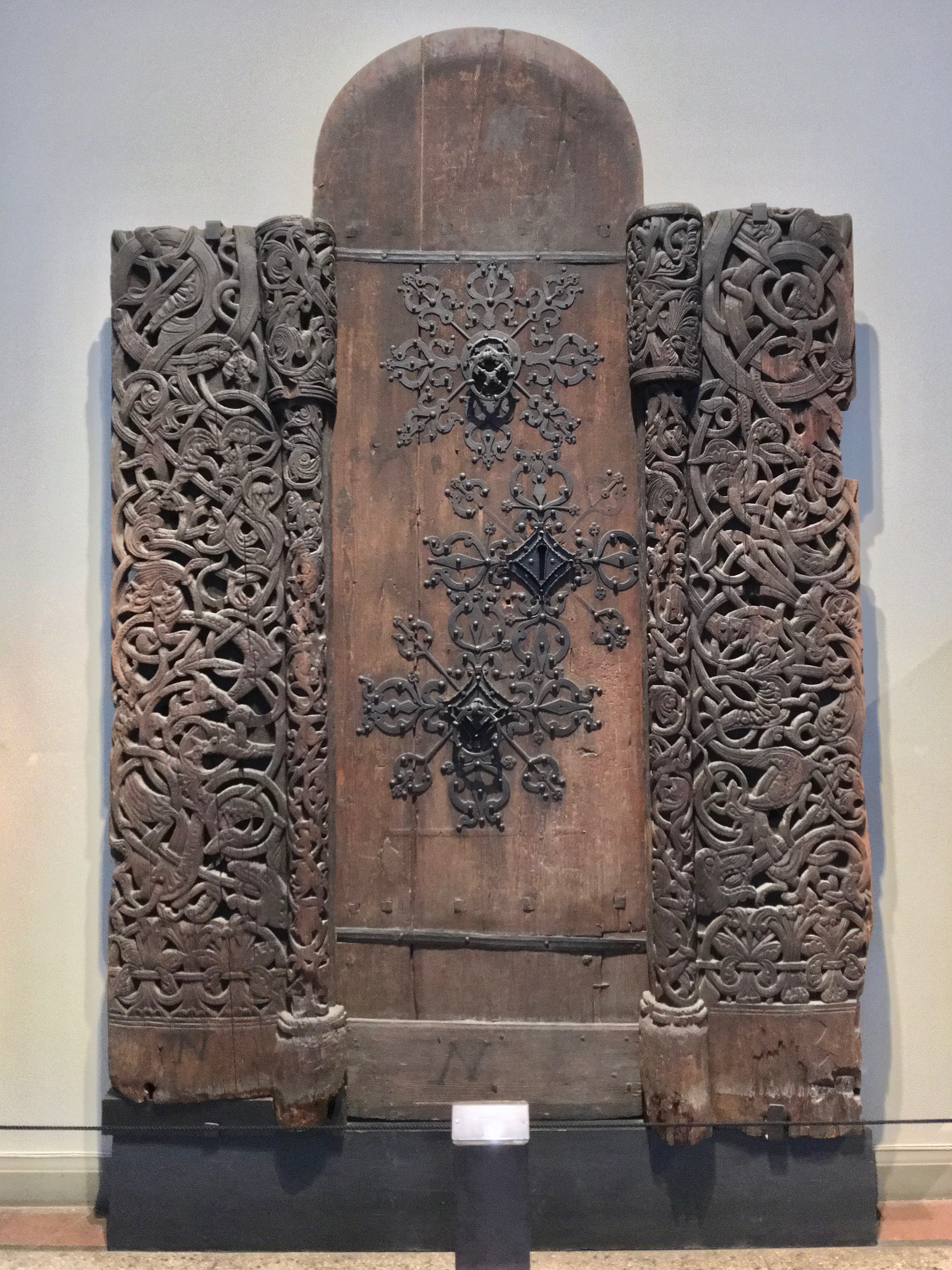
Kulturhistorisk Museum, Oslo, Norway. Stave Church Portal

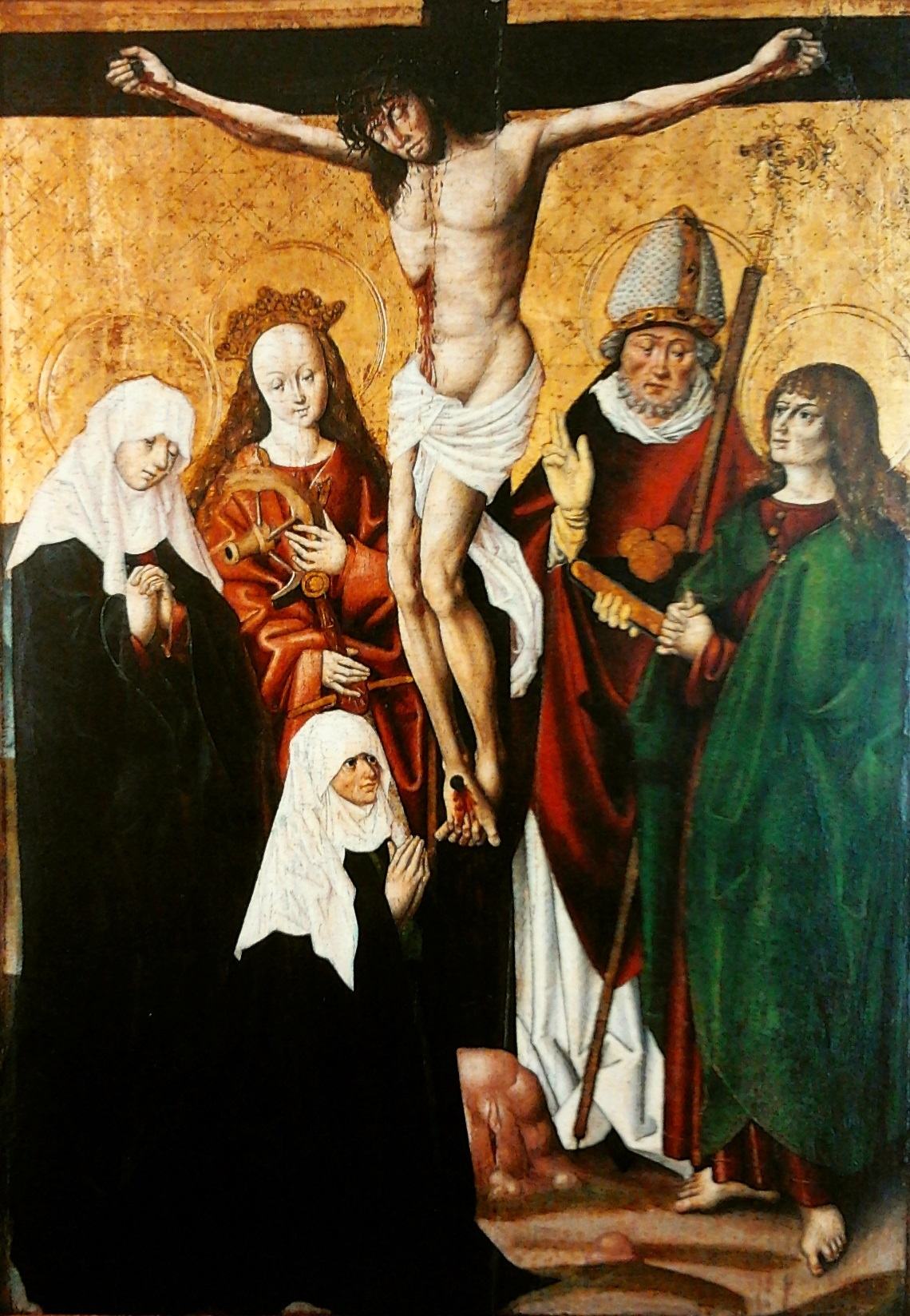
Wrocław Epitaph of Katharina Lindner

== See also ==
- Andachtsbilder
- Animals in Christian art
- Archangel Michael in Christian art
- Arma Christi
- Catholic Church art
- Christian icons
- Christian music
- Christian poetry
- Christian symbolism
  - Saint symbolism
- Crucifixion in the arts
- God the Father in Western art
- Holy Spirit in Christian art
- Trinity in Christian art
- Iconography
  - Plants in Christian iconography
- Illuminated manuscript
- Islamic influences on Christian art
- List of Catholic artists
- Resurrection of Jesus in Christian art
- Sacri Monti of Piedmont and Lombardy
- Theological aesthetics
