= Attribute (art) =

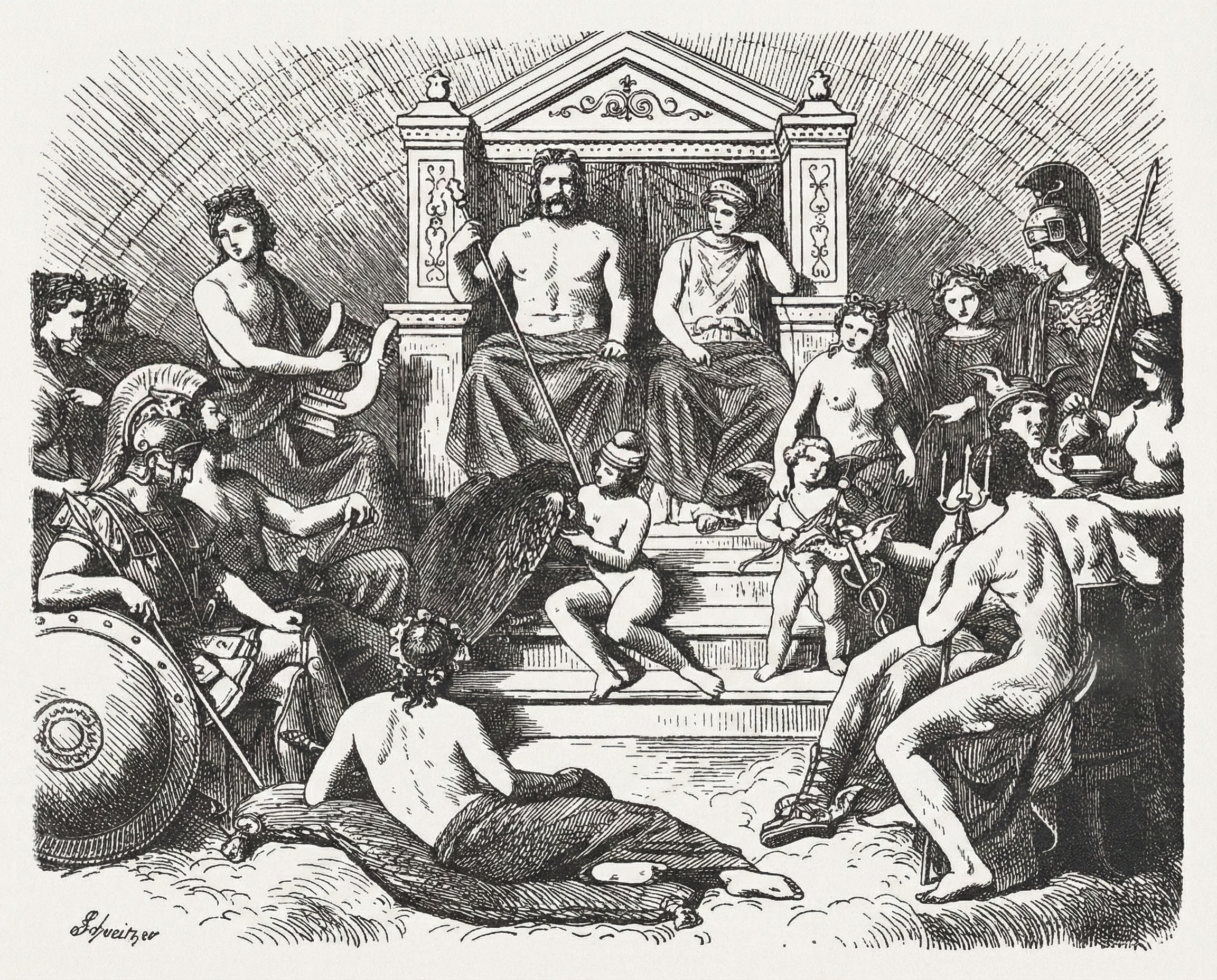
Greek gods with their attributes (1880s)

In visual arts, an attribute (also known as attributive symbol) is a symbolic or decorative object conventionally associated with a specific individual, deity, or activity. Serving as a form of "visual shorthand," attributes allow the viewer to identify figures—such as saints, prophets, or mythological gods—who might otherwise be difficult to distinguish. In architecture, attributes may be used on the exterior of a building to express its specific function or use.

== Religious art ==
Attributive symbols are widely employed in religious art across various cultures to identify divine figures. In Egyptian art, Osiris is distinguished by the crook and flail and Isis by the girdle tie. In the ancient Near East, the winged disk is an attribute of the Assyrian god Ashur, while the Mušḫuššu creature accompanies the Babylonian deity Marduk. Hindu iconography assigns specific animals to deities, often acting as attributes or vehicles (vahana): the swan for Brahma, the eagle for Vishnu, and the bull or cobra for Shiva. In Japanese art, Ebisu is identified by a fishing rod and fish basket, while the belief in Kōshin is associated with the three mystic monkeys. Mesoamerican deities also bear distinct attributes; the Aztec goddess Coatlicue wears a skirt of snakes, and Xochipilli is depicted with a bird crest and a butterfly painted on his mouth.

=== Christian art ===
In Christian art, attributes are essential for identifying patriarchs, prophets, and saints. While some attributes are generalized (like a palm frond for a martyr, a book or scroll for a prophet, or a pastoral staff for a bishop), most figures are assigned a specific object to aid identification.

These symbols are derived from various sources, including the Bible, the Golden Legend, other hagiographies, and accounts of visions. They may represent:

- A significant biblical episode: A chalice for Melchisedech; a small boy (Isaac) for Abraham; or camel-hair clothing for Saint John the Baptist.
- The instrument of martyrdom: A gridiron for Saint Lawrence; a wheel for St. Catherine; or a flaying knife for St. Bartholomew.
- A physical trait or spiritual event: The stigmata for St. Francis of Assisi; or a lily representing purity for the Virgin Mary.

Some biblical figures possess multiple attributes; for example, King David may be shown with a harp or a crown, while Saint Peter may hold keys, a book, or a scroll. Conversely, a single symbol may belong to multiple saints: St. Hubert, St. Eustace, and St. Giles are all associated with a deer, while St. Dorothy and St. Elizabeth are both depicted with roses.

Attributes are also used to identify personifications of abstract concepts, such as Ecclesia and Synagoga.

== Classical art ==
Attributive symbols in Greek art developed as a necessity due to the limited number of anthropomorphic types available to early artists: the nude male and the draped female. Because these artists did not practice realism or portraiture, they relied on distinguishing accessories, like the Aegis for Athena or the Caduceus for Hermes, to identify specific characters who otherwise shared a generic form.

In classical art and Roman mythology, deities are identified by objects that express their character or authority.

- Zeus: Known by the thunderbolt, scepter, and eagle. Specific attributes may indicate different functions: a wreath of oak leaves represents his mantic nature at Dodona, while the presence of Cerberus marks him as Zeus-Hades.
- Apollo: Associated with the lyre. His attributes often vary by function: a bow and arrow for the "Far-Darter," a lyre for the god of music, and a tripod for the god of prophecy.
- Artemis: Depending on her aspect, she may be shown with a stag or wild animal (as Potnia Theron), a torch (as a chthonian goddess).
- Aphrodite (or Venus): Associated with a dove. She is also distinguished by a pomegranate, apple, poppy, or an accompanying Eros.
- Poseidon (or Neptune): Associated with a trident. He may also be identified by a fish or a horse.
- Ares: Identified by the accoutrements of war, such as in the Ludovisi statue.
- Demeter: Often accompanied by a cornucopia as a symbol of plenty.
- Dioscuri: Recognized by stars, piloi (conical hats), oil cruses, or strigils.

The peacock is the traditional attribute of Juno. This association is derived from a story in Ovid's Metamorphoses: after Mercury murdered Argus (the hundred-eyed giant Juno had set to watch over Io), Juno commemorated Argus by setting his eyes into the tail of her peacock.

== Secular and civic use ==
=== Civic symbolism ===
The attributes of patron saints often became symbols of national or civic identity. For example, the cross of Saint George is part of the British flag, while the Lion of Saint Mark (the attribute of St. Mark) serves as the coat of arms for Venice.

=== Guilds ===
Attributes were central to the symbolism of trade guilds, which often adopted a patron saint associated with their profession:

- Carpenters: Saint Joseph or St. Thomas (often shown with a carpenter's square).
- Painters and Doctors: St. Luke (who was a physician and reputedly painted the first Madonna and Child).
- Armourers: St. George (depicted as a warrior, such as in the statue by Donatello for Orsanmichele).

=== Architecture ===
In architecture, attributes are decorative elements used to denote the purpose of a building. For example, lyres may appear on the exterior of concert halls, while tridents are often found on buildings associated with marine or naval affairs.

== Examples ==
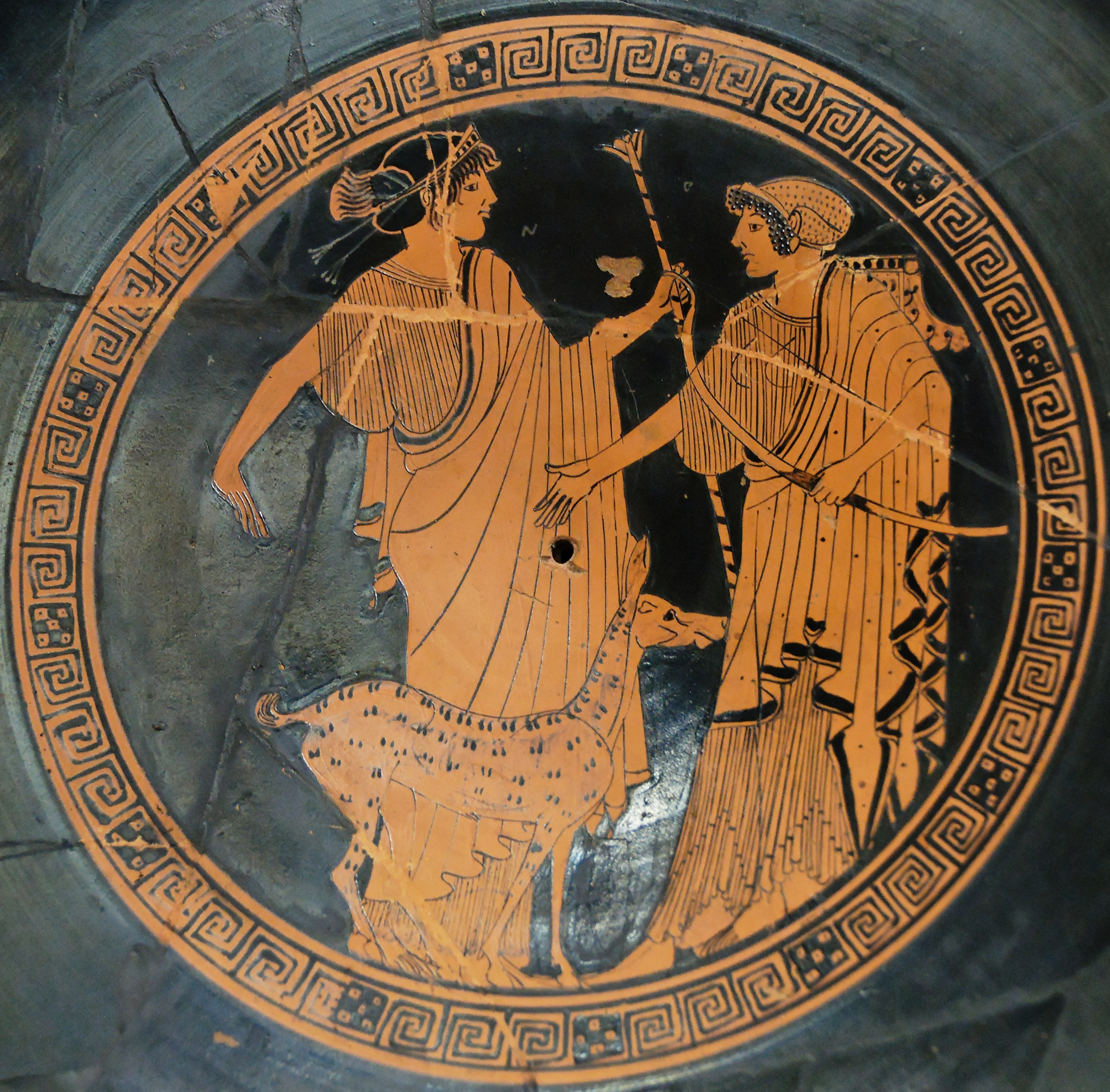
Apollo with the arrow bringing death and plague, Artemis with bow, quiver, and hunting dog; Greek pottery, c. 470 BC.

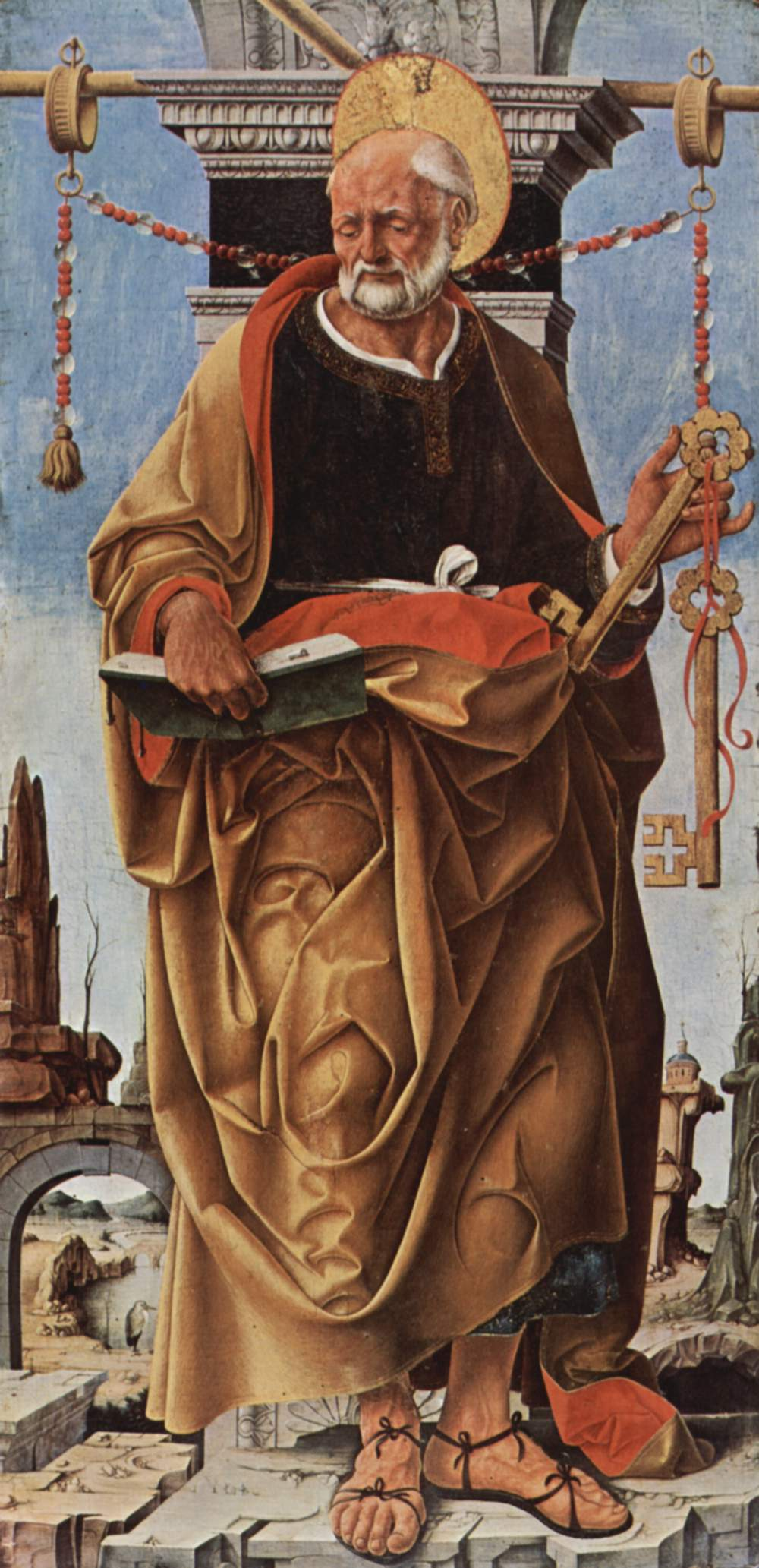
Francesco del Cossa: Saint Peter with key, 1473.

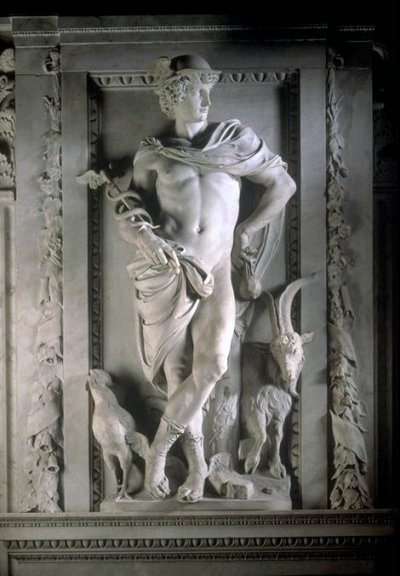
Statue of the Roman god Mercury, with his attributes: winged helmet, caduceus, winged sandals, purse, rooster, and goat; 17th century.

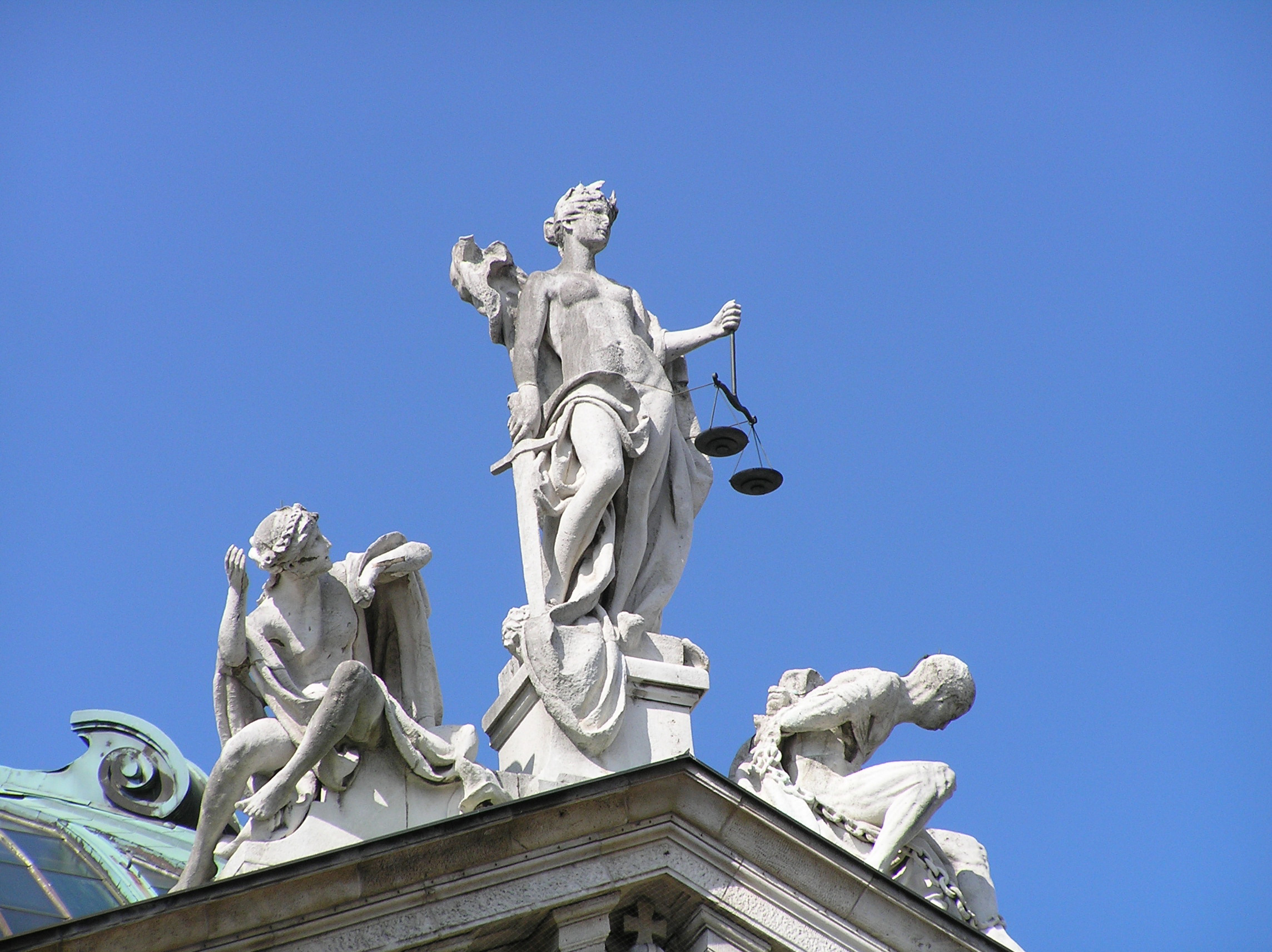
Allegory of Justice (Justitia) on the Palace of Justice in Munich, with the attributes scales and sword, 1897.

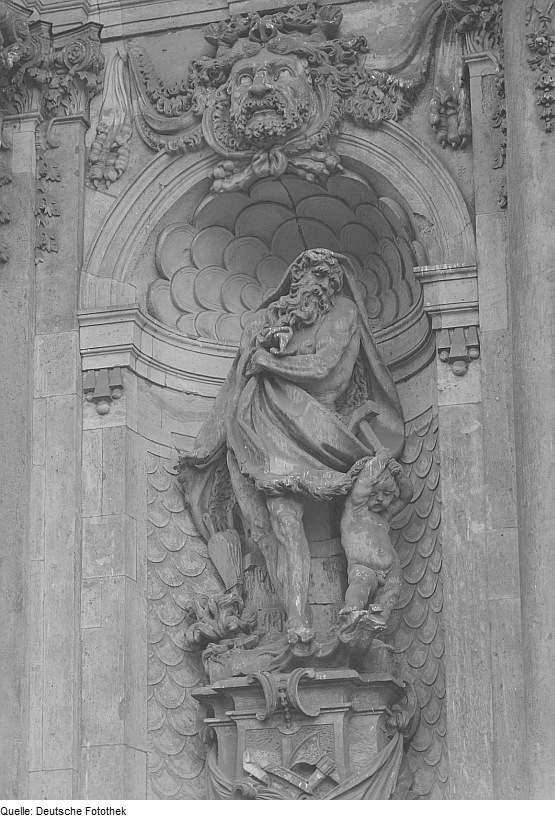
Vulcan, the Roman god of smithing with hammer, anvil, and forge at the Crown Gate of the Dresden Zwinger, 1715 (hist. photo 1945, Deutsche Fotothek).

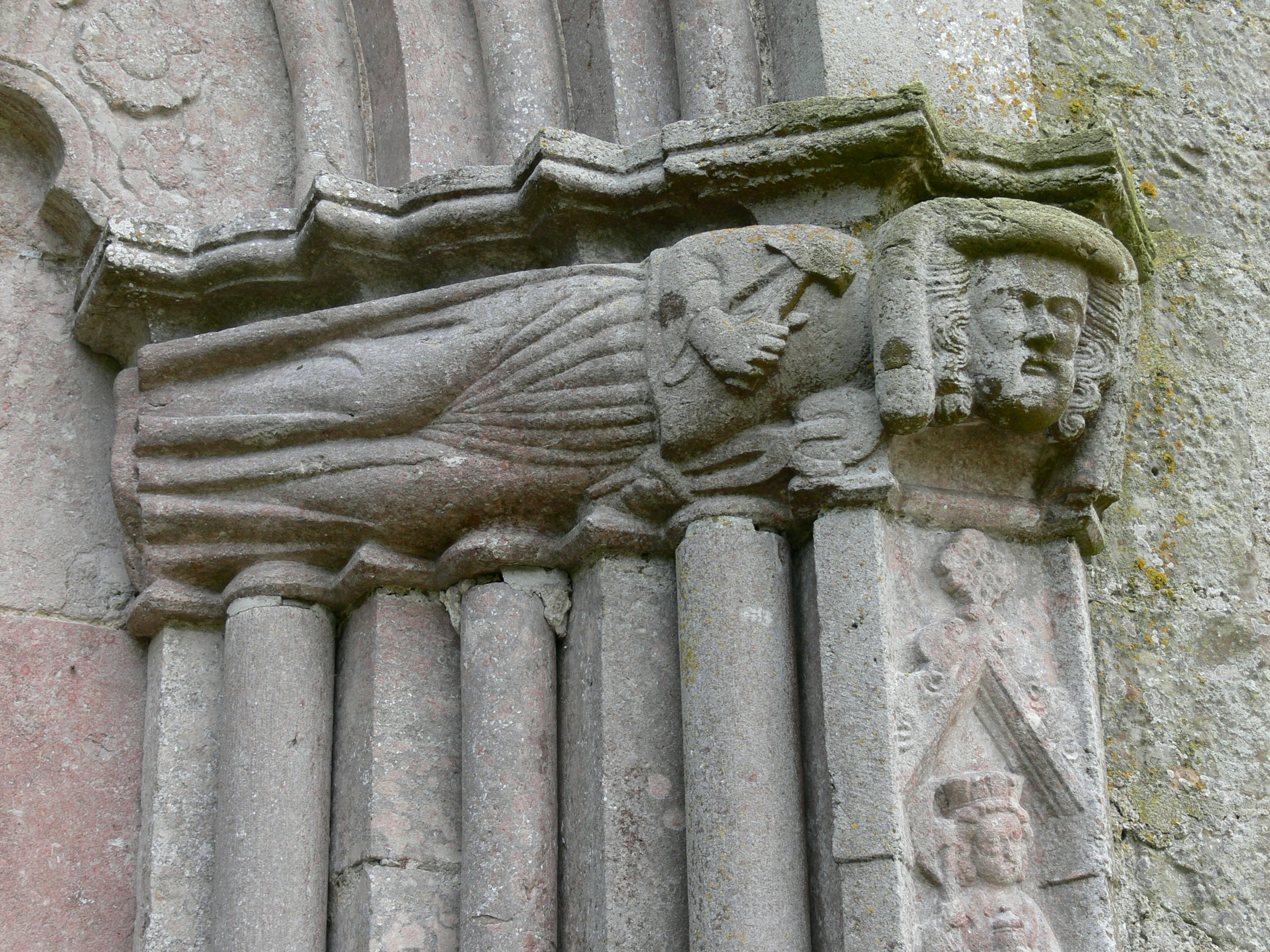
Saint Eligius as patron saint of smiths on the north portal of Öja Church on Gotland with hammer and tongs; 14th century.

== See also ==
- Emblem
