= Plants in Christian iconography =

Plants in Christian art

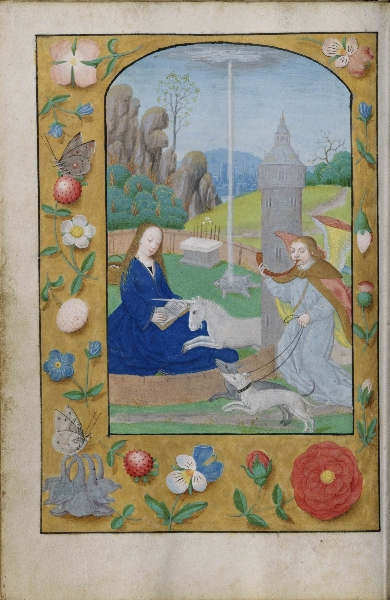
Illumination of a unicorn (a symbol of the incarnation of Christ, of innocence and purity) falling asleep on the lap of a virgin. The border shows plants which symbolise the virtues of the Virgin Mary, such woodland strawberries, roses and violets; Mary's robe is blue, a traditional colour attribution.

In Christian iconography plants appear mainly as attributes on the pictures of Christ or the Virgin Mary. Christological plants are among others the vine, the columbine, the carnation and the flowering cross, which grows out of an acanthus plant surrounded by tendrils. Mariological symbols include the rose, lily, olive, cedar, cypress and palm. Plants also appear as attributes of saints, especially virgins and martyrs.

== Background ==
In Christian art, plants and flowers show up chiefly as traits on the photos of Christ or the Virgin Mary. Plants additionally show up as characteristics of holy people, particularly virgins and saints.

== Plants in Christian iconography ==
Flower	Symbol	Reason
Acacia	The immortality of the soul	Durability of the wood
Almond	Divine approval	From the Book of Numbers: "The next day Moses entered the Tent of the Testimony and saw that Aaron's staff, which represented the house of Levi, had not only sprouted but had budded, blossomed and produced almonds."
Anemone	Crucifixion scenes; also associated with the sorrow of Virgin Mary	Anemones are said to have grown at Golgotha
Columbine	Victory of life over death, thus a plant assigned to Christ, furthermore a symbol of humility, the Holy Spirit and the Holy Trinity	The name "columbine" comes from the Latin for "dove", due to the resemblance of the inverted flower to five doves clustered together.
Daisy	Innocence, beauty, salvation, modesty, purity and love	Simplicity
Clover	Holy Trinity, Patrick of Ireland	Three petals that compose a flower
Hyacinth	Prudence, constancy, desire of heaven and peace of mind	From the story of Hyacinthus, upon whose death the flower sprung forth
Iris	Our Lady of Sorrows	Sharp leaves like swords
Lily	Purity, theological virtues of justice, charity and hope; also the Holy Trinity. The White Lily is specific to virginal saints, whether female or male	Lilies with three petals
Lily of the valley	Chastity, humility and humbleness of Mary	
Palm branch	Martyrdom	Symbol of victory, triumph and peace
Passionflower	Crucifixion of Jesus	Each part of the flower represents a different aspect of the Passion of Christ
Primula	Virgin Mary	Keys of heaven
Rose	Mary, other virgins	The white rose symbolises innocence and faithfulness, the red rose stands for love and passion
Snowdrop	Virgin Mary	Symbolises hope, purity and virtue
Strawberry	Virgin Mary	Symbolises righteousness and humility. Their flowers embody chastity, but they also became a symbol of transience and vanity. The fruit is a symbol for the Incarnation of Christ.
White tulip	Holy Spirit	White tulips are used to send a message of forgiveness

== See also ==
- Christian symbolism
- Arma Christi
- Animals in Christian art
- Saint symbolism
