= Animals in Christian art =

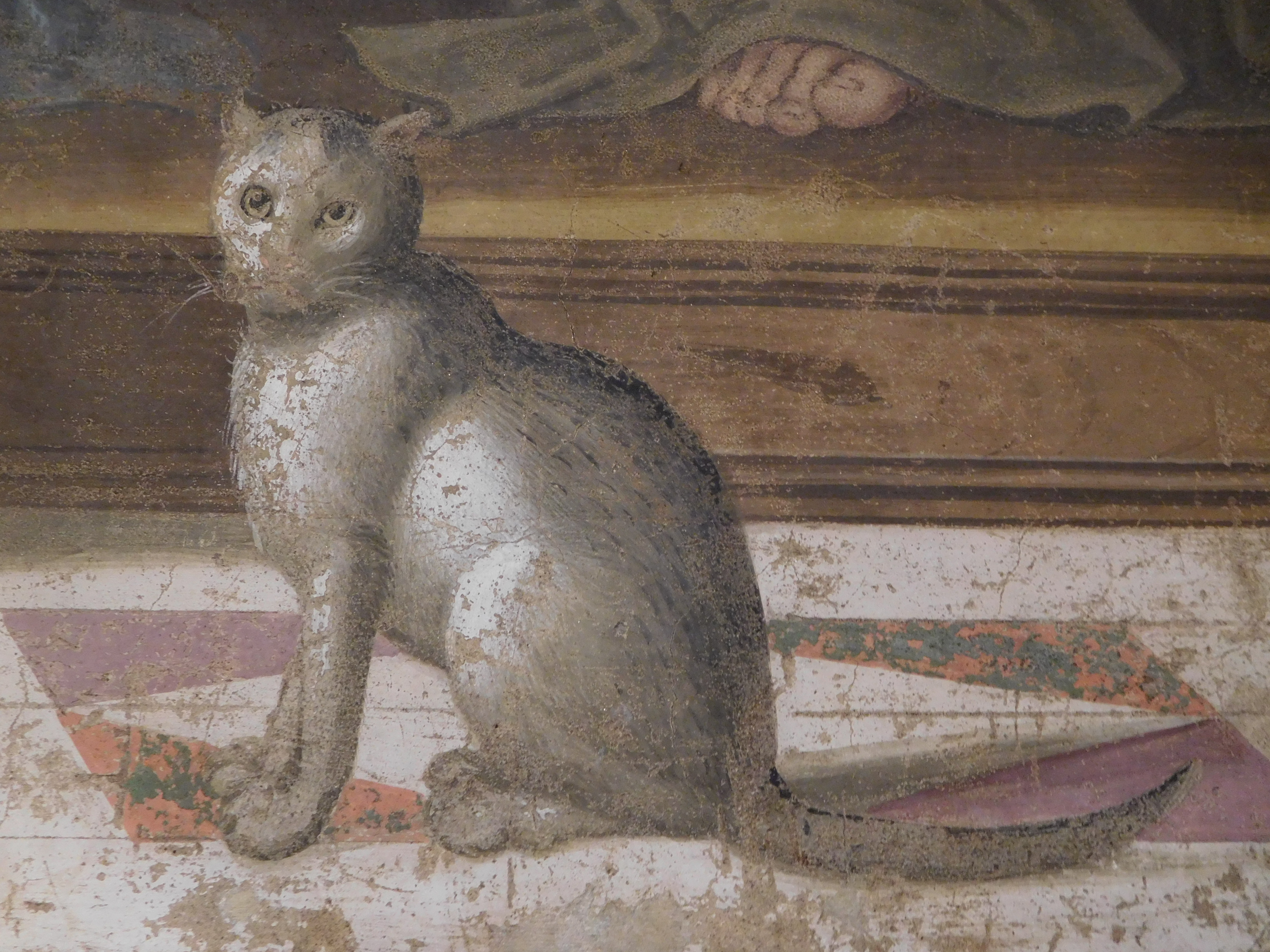
Cat in Domenico Ghirlandaio's Last Supper fresco, San Marco, Florence, 1486

In Christian art, animal forms have at times occupied a place of importance. With the Renaissance, animals were nearly banished, except as an accessory to the human figure.

== Late Antique period ==
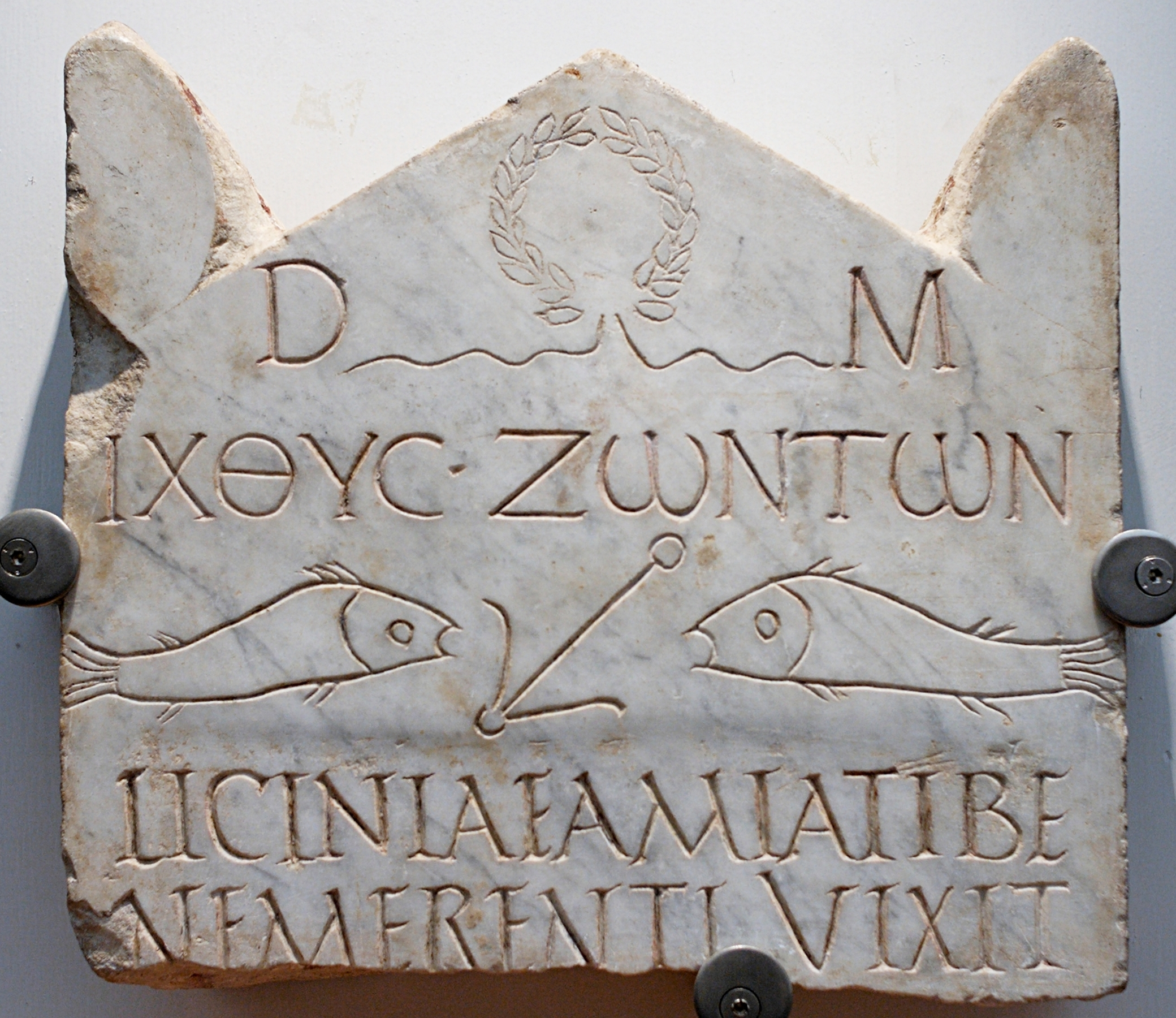
Funerary stele inscribed ΙΧΘΥϹ ΖΩΝΤΩΝ ("fish of the living"), early 3rd century

In the early days of Latin and Byzantine Christianity, many representations of animals are found in monumental sculpture, in illuminated manuscripts, in stained glass windows, and in tapestry. Reasons for this include:^{[a]}

1. It affords an easy medium of expressing or symbolizing a virtue or a vice, by means of the virtue or vice usually attributed to the animal represented.^{[a]}
2. Animal forms were traditional elements of decoration. ^{[a]}
3. Medieval designers returned to the direct study of nature, including man, the lower animals, and the humblest plants.^{[a]}

The paintings of the first period, as seen in the Catacombs of Rome, show us, usually, the lamb accompanying the Good Shepherd, a representation of the Christian soul during its earthly life.^{[a]} The lamb was strongly associated with religious sacrifices in the ancient Near East, and was adopted as a symbol of Christ and his sacrifice on behalf of humanity.

Birds, too, appear either as simple decorative elements transmitted from antique paintings, or used symbolically as in Noah's dove, symbolical of the Christian soul released by death; the peacock, with its ancient meaning of immortality, and the phoenix, the symbol of apotheosis.^{[a]}

The symbol of perhaps the widest distribution is the Ichthys (Greek: ΙΧΘΥΣ, fish), used since the second century as an acronym for "Ίησοῦς Χριστός, Θεοῦ Υἱός, Σωτήρ" (Iesous Christos, Theou Huios, Soter), meaning "Jesus Christ, Son of God, Saviour". Artistically, these various representations are somewhat crude, and show the decadence of the pagan art of the time.^{[a]}

After the recognition of the Church by Constantine I in 313, the Book of Revelation is the source from which are derived most of the decorative themes of Christian Art. The lamb is now the most important of these, and its meaning is either the same as before or, more frequently perhaps, it is symbolic of Christ the expiatory victim. The dove is the Holy Spirit, and the four animals that St. John saw in Heaven are used as personifications of the Four Evangelists.^{[a]} Under the influence of Byzantine art, a great variety of fantastic animals, such as dragons, birds with human heads, winged lions, etc., entwined themselves around the decorative forms until foreign wars and the iconoclast movement brought this period of vigorous art to an end.^{[a]}

== Middle Ages ==
=== Fantastic and composite animals ===
During the succeeding three centuries, new types of animals appear only in Romanesque architecture. These are usually either purely fantastic or composite, that is, made up of elements of different species combined in one. Often, the subject grows out of foliage forms; and monsters are shown fighting and even devouring one another.^{[a]}

=== Specific symbols ===
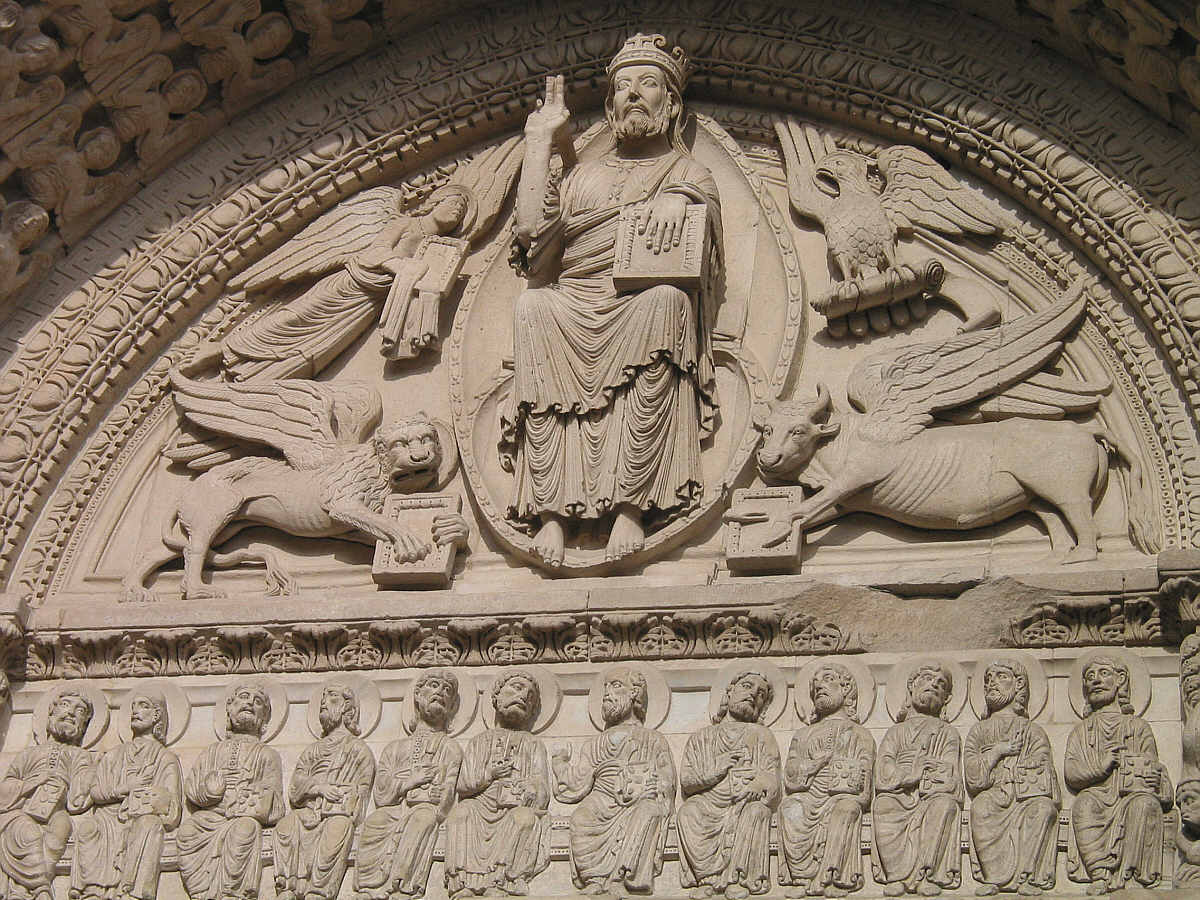
The symbols of the Four Evangelists around the glorified Christ, St Trophime, Arles, 12th century. Clockwise, Mark (lion, lower left), Matthew (human), John (eagle), and Luke (ox bull).

In the spandrels of the entrance doorways, around the glorified Christ, the symbols of the four evangelists, namely the lion, the ox, the man, and the eagle are shown, holding the holy books. This is a favourite motif in the sculpture of the eleventh and twelfth centuries. Sometimes the jaws of a monster figure the entrance of Hell, into which sinners are plunged.^{[a]}

Some of the most important symbolic animals are:

Animal	Attributes	Symbolism
Lamb	Innocence, purity, vulnerability	Christ
Dog	Loyalty, watchfulness, trustworthiness	A person with those attributes
Dove	Purity, peace	(If with halo) Holy Spirit
Dragon	Powers of darkness	The devil
Snake	cunning, deceit	The devil

=== Symbolic animals from bestiaries ===
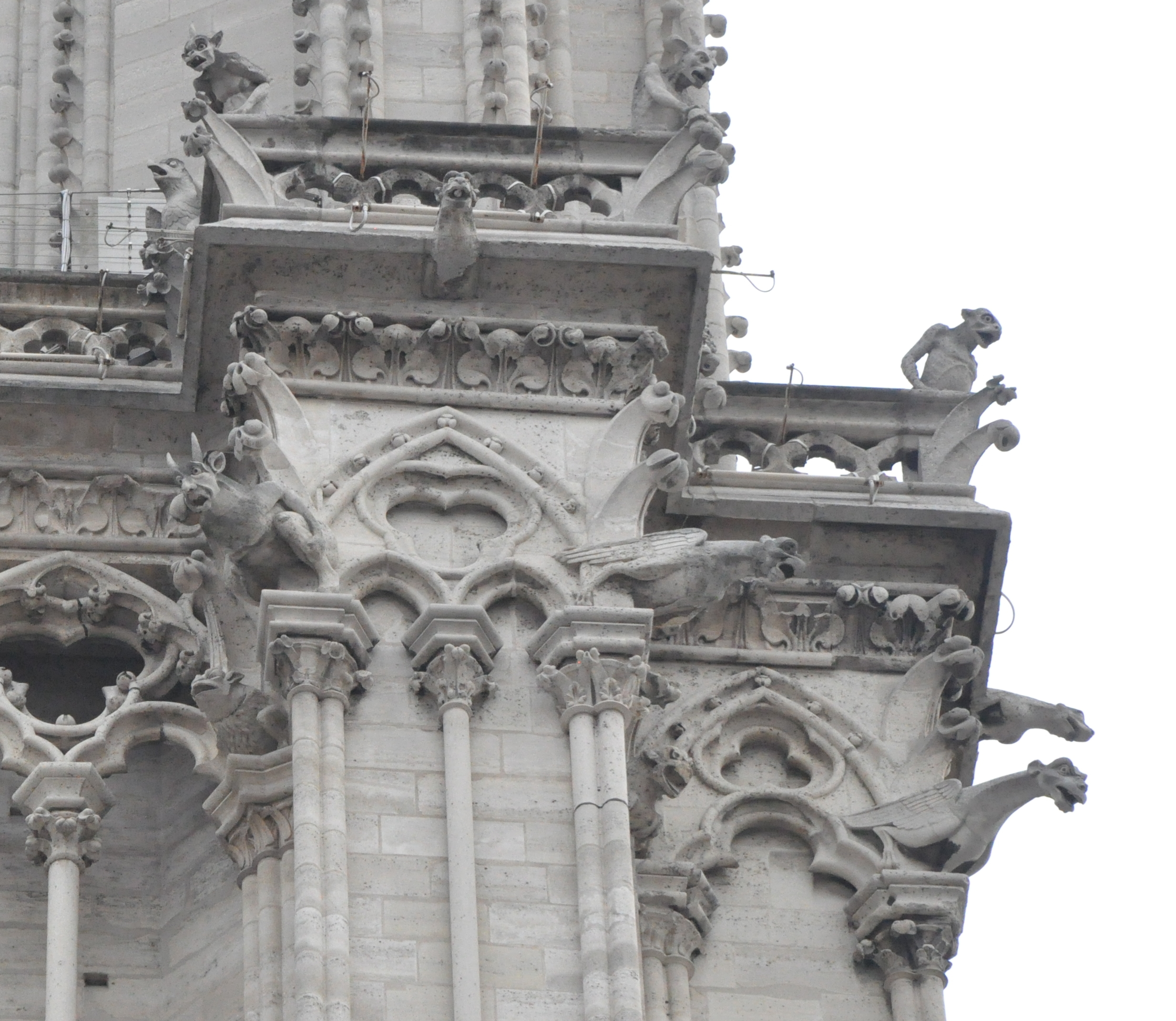
Monstrous medieval beasts decorating the West facade of Notre Dame de Paris

With the beginning of the thirteenth century Gothic art affords the greatest number and the best representations of animal forms. The great cathedrals, especially those of the Isle of France, where sculpture reached its highest point of excellence, are a sort of encyclopedia of the knowledge of the time. They show, therefore, examples of all the then known animals, that is, whether by legend or experience. The bestiaries, developed in the twelfth century, are fully illustrated in the cathedrals in the stone carving of the capitals, the parapets, and the tops of the buttresses, and in the woodwork of the stalls.^{[a]}

There are birds of prey, wild boars, and feline forms on the towers of Notre Dame de Paris; birds covered with draperies, and elephants at Reims; enormous oxen on the towers of Laon placed there in memory of the service of those animals during the construction of the Cathedral. With the animals of the country, domestic or wild, those of remote parts of the earth, known by a few specimens, are also represented: the lion, the elephant, apes, etc.; legendary creatures also, like the unicorn, the basilisk (described by Pliny), the dragon, and the griffin.^{[a]} In classical times, the griffin was a keeper of light, attending Apollo, and Christians retained the griffin's association as a guardian of the dead. Imaginary creatures are also frequent, and the gargoyles alone display a great variety. Viollet-le-Duc remarked that he did not know, in France, two gargoyles alike.^{[a]}

The symbolism which usually attaches to the various animals is derived for the most part from the bestiaries. Thus, for the lion, strength, vigilance, and courage; for the siren, voluptuousness; for the pelican, charity. The four animals which symbolize the leading characteristics of each of the Four Evangelists become more and more an accessory used to characterize the figure of the Evangelists themselves from the fifth century onwards.^{[a]}

=== Animals used to identify saints ===
In the same way many saints, when not characterized by the instruments of their martyrdom, are accompanied by animals which identify them; as, St. Roche, with a dog; St. Hubert, with a stag; St. Jerome, with a lion; St. Peter, with a cock; St. Paul the Hermit, with a raven; St. Gertrude of Nivelles, with a cat, etc. The Bible, also, gives some motives, as the ram of Isaac, the golden calf, the brazen serpent.^{[a]}

== Renaissance ==
With the fourteenth century, animals become less frequent in iconography. The fifteenth and sixteenth centuries use them again, but copied more closely from life, usually of small size, and often without any intention of symbolism. One finds now animals such as rats, snakes, rabbits, snails, and lizards.^{[a]}

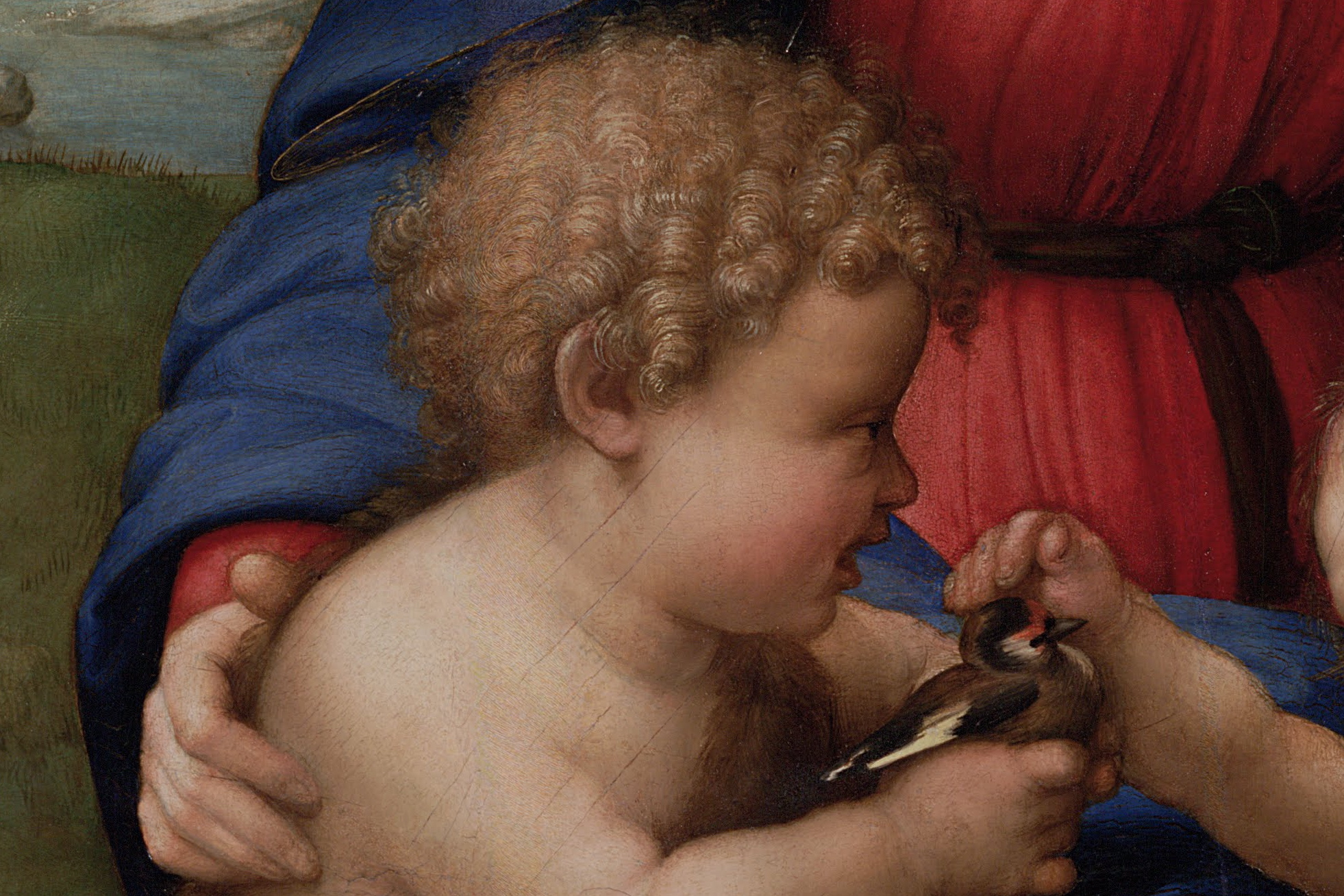
Detail of goldfinch in Raphael's Madonna del cardellino, 1506

Raphael's Madonna del cardellino (Madonna of the Goldfinch) however portrays John the Baptist holding a goldfinch while Christ reaches out his arms to touch it. This is certainly symbolic; the bird is associated by legend with the crucifixion, the red spot on its head supposedly arising from a drop of Christ's blood.

== Gallery ==
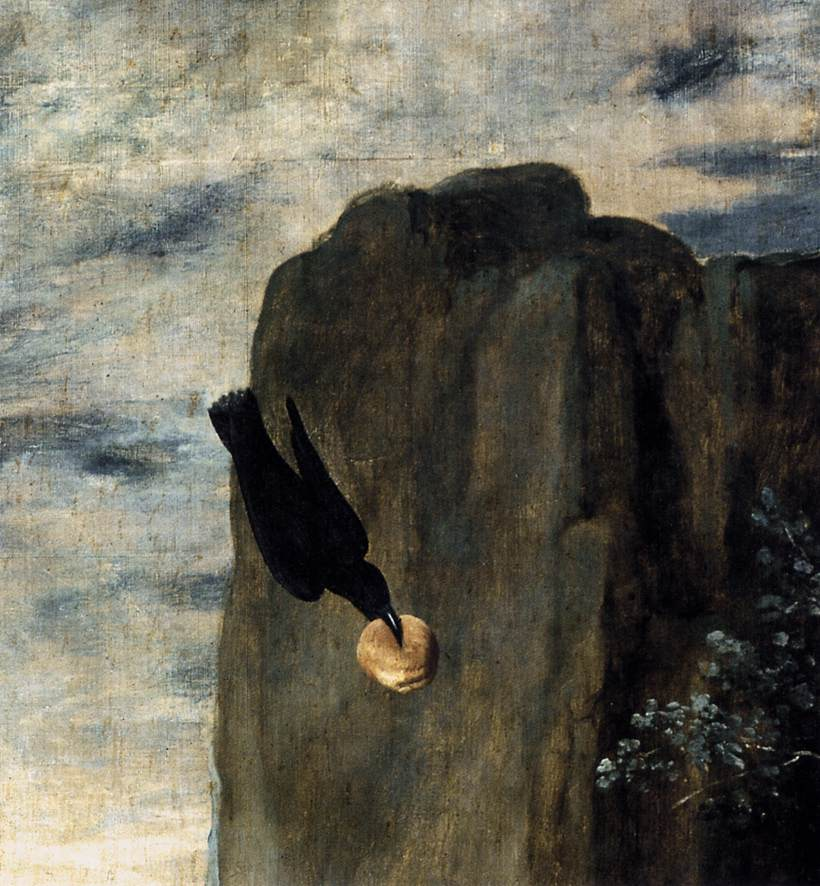
Raven identifying St. Paul the Hermit in Diego Velázquez's Saint Anthony the Great and Saint Paul the Anchorite, c. 1634

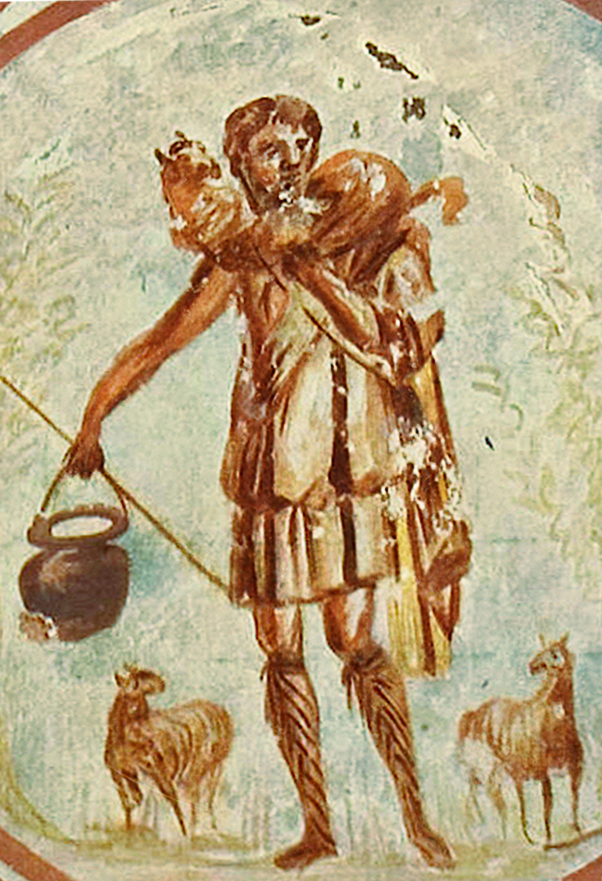
Christian souls as lambs with the Good Shepherd. San Callisto catacomb, Rome, 3rd century

== See also ==
- Plants in Christian iconography
