= Local Church controversies =

Controversies related to a Christian group

The local churches and the ministry of Watchman Nee and Witness Lee have been the subject of controversy in two major areas over the past fifty years. To a large extent these controversies stem from the rapid increase and spread of the local churches in the United States in the 1960s and early 1970s. In the 1970s they became a target of opposition of fledgling countercult ministries. Unsupported criticisms of anti-social behaviors led to three libel litigations. In addition, some criticized the teaching of Witness Lee on the nature of God, God's full salvation, and the church.

== History ==
=== Interaction with countercult ministries ===
By the 1960s the writings of Watchman Nee had become popular among evangelicals, including many in Campus Crusade for Christ (CCC). In 1968 Campus Crusade's national field director Jon Braun, who had read Watchman Nee's The Normal Christian Church Life, and all of the regional directors under him left Campus Crusade seeking the New Testament church. A short time later Braun joined a group led by Gene Edwards, a former Southern Baptist evangelist. Edwards had met with the local churches briefly before leaving to carry out his own interpretation of what the church should be.

In 1969 Campus Crusade launched what became Christian World Liberation Front (CWLF) at UC-Berkeley as an attempt to reach the young people in the counterculture. Jack Sparks, a former statistics professor at Penn State and Crusade staff member, soon became the dominant figure in CWLF. Throughout the early 1970s Sparks and Braun, who knew each other through CCC, gave talks at CWLF gatherings against Witness Lee and the local churches to stem the loss of members to the (local) church in Berkeley. Braun, who had a bitter split with Gene Edwards and left his group, joined with Sparks and five other former Crusade leaders to establish the New Covenant Apostolic Order (NCAO) with themselves as apostles. In 1979 six of the original seven NCAO apostles appointed themselves bishops of the newly formed Evangelical Orthodox Church (EOC).

In 1974 three CWLF members founded a subsidiary countercult ministry, Spiritual Counterfeits Project (SCP). In early 1975 Sparks asked a young CWLF staff member, Alan Wallerstedt, to prepare a manuscript critiquing the teaching and practices of the local churches. Later that year Sparks tried to convert CWLF into a church and bring it under the authority of the NCAO. The large majority of members would not go along and CWLF split. Wallerstedt followed Sparks but completed the manuscript he had been commissioned to write for SCP. Thus, both the NCAO and SCP had copies of Wallerstedt's manuscript.

In the summer of 1976 Peter Gillquist, the presiding NCAO apostle, became the head of the new books division at Thomas Nelson Publishers (Nelson), a respected Bible publisher. The first book Gillquist commissioned was The Mindbenders by Jack Sparks. Sparks was listed as the putative author but the chapter on the local churches was written by Braun, who, although he had never met with the local churches, blamed Watchman Nee and Witness Lee for his negative experience with Gene Edwards. Meanwhile, SCP was independently developing Wallerstedt's manuscript into a book titled The God-Men. First editions of both The Mindbenders and The God-Men were published in 1977.

Responding to the strong demand for countercult publications after the Jonestown tragedy of November 1978, second editions of both books were published. Before and after each edition of either book was published, members of the local churches wrote letters of protest to the authors and publishers and attempts were made to contact them both personally and by phone. Nelson alone received approximately three hundred responses. InterVarsity Press, the publisher of the second edition of The God-Men, received a response including over five hundred pages of supporting documentation refuting the book's charges.

The Mindbenders and The God-Men accused the local churches not just of theological error but of sociological deviance, including practicing authoritarianism, thought reform, isolation of members, deceptive recruiting, use of fear and humiliation to control members, and financial malfeasance. Following publication, members of the local churches became objects of harassment, physical assault, and attempted deprogrammings. In addition, members were dismissed from jobs and family relationships were damaged. In China the Three-Self Patriotic Movement commissioned two men to write a book to provide justification for a nationwide persecution against the local churches. The authors relied on The God-Men and its accusations in their writing. Over two thousand local church members were arrested, many were given extended sentences, and some were even executed.

=== Seeking relief from libel ===
In 1980, after all attempts to communicate with the authors and publishers were rebuffed, groups of local churches and individual church members filed libel actions concerning The Mindbenders in four jurisdictions—Anaheim, Dallas, Atlanta, and Cleveland. The lawsuits named Nelson, Sparks, Braun, Dick Ballew (an EOC bishop and close associate of Braun), and Gillquist as defendants. The discovery process was subsequently consolidated to expedite the cases. A separate libel action was filed by the Church in Anaheim, Witness Lee, and William T. Freeman against Neil Duddy, the principal author of The God-Men; Spiritual Counterfeits Project; and Schwengeler-Verlag, publisher of a German translation of the same Duddy manuscript which was the basis for the second edition of The God-Men. Although the local churches strongly protested that both The Mindbenders and The God-Men misrepresented their teachings, the issues raised in the lawsuits were not theological but were based on the books' false and defamatory accusations of sociological deviance.

Discovery in The Mindbenders case revealed that Gillquist had used his position within Nelson to push for publication of the book over objections from internal staff and outside reviewers of the pre-publication proofs. After two years of discovery, the case was settled out of court. All defendants signed an agreement that stipulated financial recompense for damages and that Nelson issue a retraction to be published in major newspapers and Christian periodicals nationwide.

Early in The God-Men case Neil Duddy and SCP had a rancorous split stemming from Duddy's claims of SCP's financial mismanagement. Duddy moved to Denmark to avoid entanglement in The God-Men proceedings. Depositions showed that Duddy failed to document his accusations against the local churches with credible evidence and that SCP, despite having misgivings about Duddy's research, had not fact-checked his work or sought independent verification.

On the day the court was to schedule the trial, SCP's attorneys, in anticipation of a judgment against SCP, announced that their client had filed for Chapter 11 bankruptcy. Neither Duddy nor representatives of Schwengeler-Verlag made an appearance. The court granted the plaintiffs' petition for permission to present their evidence despite the SCP bankruptcy and the other defendants' default. The local churches retained six experts to testify on their behalf. During the proceedings Judge Leon Seyranian questioned the witnesses and experts in the absence of defense counsel. At the end of those proceedings, he stated that he was satisfied that the evidence presented was sufficient to decide the case without cross examination. After reviewing the conduct of the court proceedings in his decision, Judge Seyranian declared:

Accordingly, the Court finds that the manuscript by Neil. T. Duddy entitled The God-Men (Exhibit 1) disseminated (published) in the United States, the book Die Sonderlehre des Witness Lee und Seiner Ortsgemeinde published by Schwengeler-Verlag (Exhibit 3) disseminated (published) in Europe, and the book The God-Men, An Inquiry Into Witness Lee and the Local Church by Neil T. Duddy and the SCP published by Inter-Varsity Press (Exhibit 5) disseminated (published) in the United States and England, are in all major respects false, defamatory and unprivileged, and, therefore, libelous.

The court awarded damages in the amount of $11.9 million, which at the time was the largest final libel award in American history. Only a small fraction of the judgment was ever paid. SCP later claimed that the only reason they lost the litigation was that a protracted discovery process had drained their financial resources. However, a recent publication has challenged the veracity of this claim using SCP's own financial reports.

=== Reaction to the decision ===
The outcome of the cases was widely dismissed by the countercult community and the Christian press. Elliot Miller, Editor-in-Chief of Christian Research Journal, later described the countercult community's rejection of the court's decision as "suppressing truth for the sake of a common cause and camaraderie among colleagues." As a result, The Mindbenders and The God-Men shaped others' perceptions of Witness Lee and the local churches for many years. Among those who disagreed with these publications was Dr. J. Gordon Melton, who published an open letter in which he faulted the research and apologetic method of The God-Men and stated that Witness Lee's teachings had been grossly misrepresented. Melton called for The God-Men and other attacks derived from it to be discarded. He further called for "other more capable and responsible Christian scholars" to review and examine Witness Lee's teachings.

=== Former SCP researcher renews controversy ===
In 1999, a chapter on the local churches and Living Stream Ministry (LSM), the publisher of the ministry of Watchman Nee and Witness Lee, appeared in Encyclopedia of Cults and New Religions (ECNR), by John Ankerberg and John Weldon, published by Harvest House. Weldon had worked for both SCP and Christian Research Institute (CRI) between 1975 and 1985. Weldon had written a draft for a proposed encyclopedia in the early 1980s as part of a "doctoral dissertation" at Pacific School of Graduate Studies, a now defunct diploma mill. Weldon's draft included a "Local Church" chapter that was based on and incorporated large portions of The God-Men manuscript.

Representatives of the local churches and LSM wrote to the authors and the publisher of ECNR protesting their inclusion in the book. They made several attempts to meet personally with Ankerberg and Harvest House president Robert Hawkins, Jr. These overtures, some made through third parties with connections to the publisher, were ignored or rejected.

Harvest House sued the Church in Fullerton on December 14, 2001, in an Oregon court, claiming that the letters of protest and accompanying documentation sent to them were a form of harassment. Because Harvest House refused to sign a tolling agreement to extend the statute of limitations, ninety-nine local churches and LSM initiated a libel action against the authors and the publisher on December 31, 2001. The Circuit Court of the State of Oregon dismissed Harvest House's lawsuit on March 15, 2002.

The churches' complaint alleged that ECNR characterized the groups identified in the book as being guilty of criminal and sociological aberrations, including "subjecting members to physical harm," "fraud or deception concerning fund raising or financial costs," "acceptance of shamanism," "participating in drug smuggling and other criminal activities," "murder," "encouraging prostitution," "child molestation," and "practicing black magic and witchcraft." The complaint was based on the structure of ECNR, which was in three parts:

- An introduction defining the characteristics of cults
- The main body of the book, containing chapters on individual groups; and
- An appendix addressing points of doctrine and claims of occult involvement in the new religions.

The complaint alleged that by identifying characteristics of cults and then naming the local churches as a cult, a reasonable reader would apply the defined characteristics to the local churches.

The trial court rejected multiple summary judgment motions from the defendants, ruling that a jury should decide how a reasonable reader would understand the book. However, on January 5, 2006, the Court of Appeals for the First District of Texas reversed the trial court and ruled that the complaint of language in the book could not be understood to be "of and concerning" the plaintiffs. Their opinion stated that a reader could not reasonably construe the "Characteristics of Cults" as itemized in ECNR's Introduction as applying to every group discussed in the individual chapters. Both the Supreme Court of Texas and the U. S. Supreme Court declined to review appeals. Neither of these courts ruled on the correctness of the Appeals Court decision, nor did they review the merits of the churches' original complaint.

=== Differing opinions among Evangelicals ===
In the first decade of the 21st century, two different groups initiated multi-year studies of the local churches, such as J. Gordon Melton called for in 1985. One was undertaken by a panel of faculty members from Fuller Theological Seminary, including President Richard J. Mouw, Dean of Theology Howard Loewen, and Professor of Systematic Theology Veli-Matti Kärkkäinen; the other was by Christian Research Institute, headed by Hank Hanegraaff, along with Answers in Action, headed by Gretchen Passantino. The Fuller panel stated:

It is the conclusion of Fuller Theological Seminary that the teachings and practices of the local churches and its members represent the genuine, historical, biblical Christian faith in every essential aspect.

The Fuller panel further wrote that "the teachings of Witness Lee have been grossly misrepresented and therefore most frequently misunderstood in the general Christian community, especially among those who classify themselves as evangelicals." Christianity Today endorsed the Fuller panel's findings in an editorial in its March 2006 issue.

In 2007, during the appeals of the ECNR litigation, a group of "evangelical scholars and ministry leaders" published an open letter calling on the leadership of LSM and the local churches to disavow certain statements by Witness Lee and the use of litigation against fellow Christians. Representatives of the local churches and LSM published a brief and a longer response to their open letter.

In late 2009 CRI dedicated an issue of Christian Research Journal to present the findings of a six-year primary research project examining the teachings and practices of the local churches. Hank Hanegraaff, representing CRI, an early critic of Witness Lee and the local churches, wrote, "The result of our primary research is encapsulated in the following three words: 'We were wrong!'" The issue contained a seven-part article by Elliot Miller reassessing the local churches and responding to the 2007 open letter. The issue included two statements by Hank Hanegraaff and an article by Gretchen Passantino in which she explained why she reversed her earlier critical opinion. This retraction was published after Ronnie Chan, a Hong Kong billionaire associated with Local Church leadership, made a substantial donation to the Christian Research Institution through his foundation, the Morningside Foundation.

In early January 2010 Norman Geisler authored a rebuttal, co-signed by Ron Rhodes, in which they made numerous accusations against both CRI and the local churches. In late spring of the same year Hank Hanegraaff wrote an article titled "Discernment in an Age of Information Overload," in which he outlined principles for performing discernment ministry using the article by Geisler and Rhodes and the 2007 "open letter" as examples of how not to do apologetics. In July 2010 Defense & Confirmation Project (DCP) began publishing a series of fourteen articles responding in detail to Geisler and Rhodes' statement. These articles and related materials were subsequently published in a series of books titled Brothers, Hear Our Defense.

== Theological controversies ==
Some of the beliefs of local churches at times are quite different with that of Evangelical Christianity although most of them are in line with the evangelical orthodoxy.

Since 1975, critics of Witness Lee and the local churches have focused on three main areas:

- Deification;
- Concerning the nature of God;
- Concerning God's full salvation; and
- Concerning the church.

=== Deification ===
In his later ministry, Witness Lee used the term deification to refer to the process of God's organic salvation. He said:

In the second to the fifth centuries, the church fathers found three high mysteries in the Bible: (1) the Triune God, the Divine Trinity, the highest mystery; (2) the person of Christ; and (3) the deification of man—that man could become God in life and in nature but not in the Godhead.

The last of these statements echoes Athanasius' aphorism, "αυτος γαρ ενηνθρωπησεν, ινα ημεις θεοποιηθωμεν" ("For He was made man in order that we might be made God"). The subject of deification in various Christian traditions has been the subject of much recent study. Two messages by Witness Lee on this subject have been reprinted in LSM journal Affirmation & Critique (A&C). In addition, A&C has devoted the majority of three issues to the subject.

Some Lutheran and Reformed Christians reject the teaching of deification, some of these due to their rejection of Christian perfection. Others, however, offer support to the language and doctrine of deification.

=== Concerning the Nature of God ===
The Triune God was a major point of emphasis in the ministry of Witness Lee. He taught six basic principles concerning the Triune God:

- God is one (Deut. 6:4; 1 Cor. 8:4b; Isa. 45:5a);
- God also has the aspect of being three persons (or hypostases)—the Father, the Son, and the Spirit (Matt. 28:19);
- All three—the Father, the Son, and the Spirit—are God (1 Pet. 1:2; Heb. 1:8; Acts 5:3-4);
- All three of the Godhead are eternal (Isa. 9:6; Heb. 7:3; 9:14);
- All three of the Godhead co-exist simultaneously (John 14:16-17; Eph. 3:14-17; 2 Cor. 13:14); and
- All three of the Godhead coinhere, that is, they mutually indwell one another (John 14:10-11; 17:21, 23).

However, critics have accused Witness Lee and the local churches of teaching modalism, due to his identification of Christ with the Spirit based on 1 Corinthians 15:45 and 2 Corinthians 3:17. According to modalism (a heresy condemned by the early church) the Father, the Son, and the Spirit are not eternally co-existent, but are three successive manifestations of God. Similarly, because of his reading of Isaiah 9:6, which says that the Son given to mankind will be called the eternal Father, Witness Lee has been accused of teaching patripassianism (a subcategory of modalism).

Witness Lee and others in the local churches have pointed to passages in the Bible that indicate the coinherence of the three of the Divine Trinity. In the mid-1970s LSM published four booklets to explain their understanding of the Trinity. These publications discuss the error of modalism and affirm that the Father, the Son, and the Spirit are not temporary manifestations but are co-eternal. The first issue of the LSM journal Affirmation & Critique (A&C), published in 1996, discussed the local churches' view of biblical trinitarianism. More recent defenses are included in the book Brothers, Hear Our Defense (2): Concerning the Divine Trinity.

=== Concerning God's Full Salvation ===
Based on Romans 5:10 Witness Lee taught that God's full salvation has two aspects. The first is judicial and is carried out through the death of Christ, by which the believers are redeemed and reconciled to God. The second is organic and is carried out through the life of Christ, which causes the believers to grow, be transformed, and mature until they are conformed to the image of Christ (2 Cor. 3:18; Rom. 8:29; 1 John 3:2).

=== Mingling ===
Witness Lee's view of God's organic salvation is related to his understanding of Christology, specifically, the relationship between the divine and human natures in Christ. Witness Lee cited the example of the meal offering in Leviticus which is composed of oil mingled with fine flour (Lev. 2:5), a type that other Bible teachers, including the Plymouth Brethren, also understood to refer to the dual nature of Christ, that is, His divinity and His humanity. Lee explained his use of the word mingling as follows:

But in Him both the divine essence and the human essence remain and are distinguishable. These essences are mingled in Him as one person without the producing of a third nature. As the God-man He possesses two natures, and in Him each nature is distinguishable.

Critics claimed that mingling of necessity involved the producing of a third nature, which is known in history as the Eutychian heresy. However, Witness Lee stated that his use of the term mingle was consistent with dictionary definitions (e.g., "to bring or combine together or with something else so that the components remain distinguishable in the combination"). He also pointed out that the Eutychian heresy was rejected at the Council of Chalcedon. More recent articles in A&C have addressed this controversy.

=== Concerning the Church ===
Watchman Nee taught that the universal church, the Body of Christ, is properly expressed in local churches, that is, local assemblies consisting of all believers in their respective localities. His most comprehensive exposition of this principle can be found in The Normal Christian Church Life, although there are significant treatments of the subject in other books as well. This teaching is based on the New Testament examples of the church in Jerusalem (Acts 8:1), the church in Antioch (Acts 13:1), the church in Corinth (1 Cor. 1:2), the seven churches in seven cities in Asia (Rev. 1:11), etc. Watchman Nee and his co-workers, including Witness Lee, established local churches throughout China according to this principle.

Witness Lee continued to follow and expound this principle in his work and ministry. He pointed out that in Acts 14:23 Paul and his co-workers appointed elders in every church upon their return to Lystra, Iconium, and Antioch, while in Titus 1:5, Paul charged his co-worker to appoint elders in every city. This, Lee said, showed that the elders in the church equaled the elders in the city, meaning that the boundary of the church was the city. Furthermore, he noted that even though there were thousands of believers in Jerusalem, the church there was referred to in the singular and there was only one group of elders in the church.

Witness Lee was often critical of the organized system of Christianity, saying that it had deviated from the biblical revelation. He identified three inherent deficiencies in this system:

- There are many substitutes for the living person of Christ;
- The clergy/laity system nullifies the proper function of the believers; and
- The divided state of the denominational/free group system is contrary to biblical injunctions to keep the oneness of the Body of Christ.

Critics represented Witness Lee's criticisms of organized Christianity as an attack on Christians and even on the Christian faith. Representatives of the local churches and LSM have responded to such criticisms in a number of publications. Elliot Miller addressed these issues in detail in the "We Were Wrong" issue of Christian Research Journal. "3: Concerning the State of Christendom", Brothers, Hear Our Defense asserts that Norman Geisler and Ron Rhodes also misrepresented Witness Lee's critique and gives examples of similar critiques by many other Christian teachers.

== Bibliography ==
- Ludekens, Ron (November 28, 1973), The Local Church of Isla Vista: aka Brothers and Sisters (unpublished manuscript).
- Seyranian, Leon (June 26, 1985b), "Statement of Decision—The Judgment on The God-Men", Libel litigations, Contending for the Faith.
