= BFA =

BFA may refer to:

== Art and entertainment ==
- Bibles for America, an organization distributing free copies of the Bible and Christian books
- British Fantasy Award

== Education ==
- Bachelor of Fine Arts, undergraduate degree for students in the United States and Canada seeking a professional education in the visual or performing arts
- Beijing Film Academy, a coeducational state-run higher education institution in Beijing, China
- Bellows Free Academy, St. Albans, a high school in the USA

== Sport ==
=== Football (soccer) ===
- Bahamas Football Association
- Beirut Football Academy
- Botswana Football Association
- Baltijos Futbolo Akademija

=== Other sports ===
- Baseball Federation of Asia
- Brawl for All
- British Fencing Association
- British Freediving Association

== Other uses ==
- Banana Framework Agreement
- Banco Financiero y de Ahorros, a Spanish financial services company
- Bibles for America, an organization distributing free copies of the Bible and Christian books
- Blank-firing adaptor or blank-firing attachment, a device for using blank ammunition in automatic firearms
- Boao Forum for Asia, an organization hosting forums discussing economic matters in Asia
- Books for Africa, a charity
- Boyne Mountain Airport, serving Boyne Falls, Michigan, United States
- British Florist Association
- British Franchise Association
- Burkina Faso, ISO 3166-1 alpha-3 code
- World of Warcraft: Battle for Azeroth, a video game expansion
- "B.F.A. (Best Friend's Ass)", 2019 song by Dimitri Vegas & Like Mike
