= The Lord's Recovery =

Christian term

The Lord's Recovery is a term coined by the Christian preacher Watchman Nee and promoted by Witness Lee that refers to a cumulative recovery of truths lost during what they refer to as the degradation of the church beginning from the second century. Although Nee and Lee recognized that there were recoveries before the time of the Reformation, their opinion was that the Lord's recovery began with Martin Luther in the Reformation because it was from then that significant recoveries were made.

== The Principle of Recovery ==
Witness Lee taught that God is always moving to accomplish His eternal purpose, and when God's work is damaged by Satan, God moves to recover what has been damaged. According to Lee, God's first recovery took place in creation. The record of God creating the universe is in Genesis 1:1, "In the beginning God created the heavens and the earth." The next verse continues, "But the earth became waste and emptiness, and darkness was on the surface of the deep" (v. 2a), indicating that the original creation was damaged. In response God carried out a recovery of the heavens and the earth, plus His further creation, in six days, beginning with "the Spirit of God was brooding upon the surface of the deep" (v. 2b). Similarly the Jewish temple was built by Solomon and later destroyed; subsequently it was recovered when the Jewish remnant returned from Babylon to Jerusalem as recorded in Ezra and Nehemiah. Witness Lee wrote that "the goal of the Lord's recovery is to recover the reality, life, livingness, strength, power, and impact of the matters revealed in the Scriptures."

== A brief history ==
Although recoveries occurred before the Reformation, Nee taught that God's greatest recoveries occurred from the sixteenth century onwards, beginning with justification by faith through Martin Luther. The recovery then went on with the Anabaptists who baptized those justified by faith. The following individuals are considered to have contributed to the recovery as well: John Calvin who established the Scottish Presbyterian Church; Philipp Jakob Spener who led his followers into the practice of 1 Corinthians 14; Christian David, Count Zinzendorf. and the Moravian Brethren who were among the first to evangelize worldwide; Miguel de Molinos who wrote "Spiritual Guide"; Madame Guyon who contributed to the matters of the union with God's will and the denial of the self; Father François Fénelon worked with Madame Guyon to release many spiritual messages; the church in "Philadelphia"; Gottfried Arnold taught on outward practices of the meeting of the church; John Wesley, Charles Wesley, and George Whitefield recovered the matters of salvation, eradication of sin, sanctification, and open-air preaching; Bible expositors among the Brethren such as John Nelson Darby, Edward Cronin and Anthony Norris Groves, William Kelly, Charles Henry Mackintosh, Benjamin Wills Newton, and John Gifford Bellett; Charles Stanley; George Cutting who wrote "Safety, Certainty, and Enjoyment;" Robert Govett who taught on the matter of Christian reward; Bibles expositors such as George Hawkins Pember, David Morrieson Panton, Hudson Taylor; George Müller who taught on prayer and faith in God's word; some among the Christian and Missionary Alliance such as Albert Benjamin Simpson and A. J Gordon who taught practiced living by faith and divine healing; Robert Pearsall Smith who taught that sanctification came through consecration and faith; Mrs. Hannah Whitall Smith who wrote "The Christian's Secret of a Happy Life"; others such as Stocknell, Evan Hopkins, and Andrew Murray, who wrote "The Spirit of Christ", continued what Guyon's denial of the self and began conferences that led to the Keswick Convention; H. C. Trumbull who spoke on the overcoming life at the Keswick Convention; Mrs. Jessie Penn-Lewis who wrote "War on the Saints" and taught about the cross of Christ with help of the writings of Guyon; and Brother Holden who experienced and taught lessons on the cross with help from Penn-Lewis' teachings. Watchman Nee and Witness Lee considered themselves as beneficiaries of this "recovery" and believed that they were part of its continuation.

Other people considered to be part of the Lord's recovery include Johann Arndt, Theodore Austin-Sparks, Margaret E. Barber, Bernard of Clairvaux, Jacob Boehme, Peter Böhler, John Bunyan, Brother Lawrence (Nicholas Herman), Jan Hus, George Henry Lang, William Law, Dwight Lyman Moody, Charles Haddon Spurgeon, William Tyndale, John Wycliffe, and Aiden Wilson Tozer.

== See also ==
- The Local Churches
- Recovery Version of the Bible
