= The Economy of God =

1968 book by Witness Lee

- front cover of The Economy of God
- Author: Witness Lee
- Language: English
- Subject: The economy of God
- Genre: Christianity
- Publisher: Living Stream Ministry
- Publication date: 1968
- Publication place: United States
- Pages: 216
- ISBN: 0-87083-415-0
- OCLC: 39149123

The Economy of God, first published in 1968, is one of Witness Lee's principal works and is a compilation of messages he gave in the summer of 1964 in Los Angeles. These messages build on one of Watchman Nee's classics, The Spiritual Man, which reveals that man is composed of three parts - spirit, soul, and body. The Economy of God shows how this understanding of the parts of man tie into the central revelation of the Bible, which is God's economy, God's plan to carry out His heart's desire of imparting Himself into man for His full expression.

== Meaning of economy ==
"The economy of God" is a quotation from 1 Timothy 1:4, according to the Greek. Economy is the Greek word "oikonomia", which primarily signifies the household management, the household administration, arrangement and distribution, or dispensation. The word "economy" is used with the intention of stressing the focal point of God's divine enterprise, which is to distribute, or dispense, Himself into man.

As noted above, the word "economy" is the anglicized form of the Greek word οἰκονομία (oikonomia). Οἰκονομία signifies the management of a household or of household affairs. Another definition is the management or administration of the property of others and thus can be translated "stewardship" in contexts such as Luke 16:2-4 where οἰκονομία is seen from the perspective of a particular person. (Note that οἰκονομία is often translated "dispensation" which commonly but erroneously is defined as a period of time or epoch.)

The word οἰκονομία is composed of οἶκος, meaning house, and νομός, meaning law.^{[3]} The word νομός can be traced back to the word νέμω, meaning "to distribute among themselves, hence to possess, enjoy, and have in use." Thus οἰκονομία can be defined as the distribution of goods to the members of a household for their possession and enjoyment.

Thus, in The Economy of God, Witness Lee reveals that God's economy is to distribute Himself, to dispense Himself, as the "household goods" to His chosen people, as members of His household, to "possess" and "enjoy."^{[4]} Lee progresses from the personal experience of God's economy to the corporate experience of the church as the expression of God on the Earth.^{[2]}

== Divine trinity ==
God's distribution of Himself starts from the divine Trinity. The Father is the source of everything while the Son is the embodiment, the course, of all that God has (Col. 2:9). Finally, the Holy Spirit is the means through which all that God is can be dispensed into His chosen people.

== The three parts of man ==
The Holy Spirit being the carrier of all the goods that God reaches the believers through their human spirit. Witness Lee teaches that the residence of the Holy Spirit is the human spirit. Lee reveals practical ways for believers to cooperate with God for the fulfillment of God's economy.

== See also ==
- Watchman Nee
- Witness Lee
