= Bibles for America =

Bibles for America (BfA)
- Non-profit Organization
- Founded: 2000
- Location: PO BOX 17537 Irvine, CA 92623
- Products: New Testament Recovery Version and Christian literature
- Website: biblesforamerica.org

Bibles for America (BfA) is a non-profit, religious organization dedicated to distributing free copies of the New Testament Recovery Version study Bible and Christian books by Witness Lee and Watchman Nee in the United States and Puerto Rico.

Since its inception, BfA has distributed over one million copies of the New Testament as well as 2.9 million Christian books in 11,343 cities.

== History ==
BfA was founded in the spring of 2000 in Irvine, California by a group of Christians in Southern California with the following statement of faith:

- The Bible is the complete and only divine revelation, inspired by the Holy Spirit.
- God is eternally one. He is also eternally the Father, the Son, and the Spirit, the three being distinct but not separate.
- Christ is both the complete God and the perfect man. He was divinely conceived in the womb of a human virgin, lived a genuine human life on earth, and died a vicarious and all-inclusive death on the cross. After three days He resurrected bodily and ascended to the heavens. He is now in glory, still fully God and fully man. He will return to reign over the earth in the millennium and in eternity.
- The Spirit, the third of the Trinity, is equally God. All that the Father has and is, is expressed by the Son; and all that the Son has and is, is realized as the Spirit.
- Man is unable to fulfill the requirements of God’s righteousness, holiness, and glory, and thus is in need of God’s salvation. Because of Christ’s death on the cross, which fulfilled all of God’s requirements, God forgives, justifies, and reconciles those who believe in Jesus Christ and His work.
- The believers, based on Christ’s redemption, are regenerated by God with His Spirit that they may become His children possessing His life and nature. They enjoy a daily salvation in His Body in this age and the eternal salvation in the coming age and in eternity.
- The New Jerusalem as the consummation of God's salvation will be the mutual habitation of the redeeming God and His redeemed elect for eternity.

The group bases its mission on this faith. Its theme verse is 1 Timothy 2:3b-4: "Our Savior God, who desires all men to be saved and to come to the full knowledge of the truth." The group recently incorporated more Christian literature by Witness Lee and Watchman Nee into its repertoire and continues to distribute the New Testament and Christian books through its website and various distribution events.

== Products ==
The organization makes a selection of Christian literature freely available. They currently distribute the New Testament Recovery Version and literature by Watchman Nee and Witness Lee, considering these to have the best potential to benefit its recipients. A list of literature that BfA provides is listed below.

- The New Testament Recovery Version study Bible
- Basic Elements of the Christian Life, vols. 1-3, by Watchman Nee and Witness Lee
- Spiritual Nourishment, a daily devotional with excerpts from the writings of Watchman Nee and Witness Lee
- The All-Inclusive Christ by Witness Lee
- The Glorious Church by Watchman Nee
- The Normal Christian Life by Watchman Nee and The Economy of God by Witness Lee
- Other products include gospel tracts, a topical Bible study guide, a Bible study mobile app, and a Bible-reading scheduler

== Activities ==
- Filling orders via phone or their website for copies of the New Testament Recovery Version and Christian books by mail.
- Distribution events throughout the United States at local universities, colleges, shopping centers, etc.
- Distribution of military-tailored products to U.S. military service members and their families on military installations around the world.
- Facilitating local Bible studies for interested recipients when possible.
- Web-based gospel outreach.

== Affiliates ==
BfA is affiliated with Bibles for Canada, Bibles for Europe, Bibles for Australia, Bibles for New Zealand, and Bibles for Japan. Rhema Literature Distributors is a similar entity operating outside of these countries. Bibles for America has a working relationship with Living Stream Ministry (LSM), the major publisher of the books of Watchman Nee and Witness Lee in the United States, and secures the books it distributes through this publisher. However, BfA is an entity independent from LSM.
