= Gulin (disambiguation) =

Gulin (古蔺县) is a county of Luzhou, Sichuan, China.

Gulin may refer to:

- Gulin, Poland, village in Radom County, Masovian Voivodeship, in east-central Poland
- Gulin Subdistrict (古林街道), Dagang District, Tianjin, China
- Gulin, Ningbo (古林镇), town in Yinzhou District, Ningbo, Zhejiang, China
- Gulin (surname)

== See also ==
- Guling (disambiguation)
