= The Normal Christian Life =

1957 book by Watchman Nee

- The Normal Christian Life published by Tyndale Publishing House
- Author: Watchman Nee
- Language: English
- Subject: Christian Life
- Genre: Christianity
- Publisher: Gospel Literature Service
- Publication place: China
- English publication date: 1957
- ISBN: 978-0-87508-990-4
- OCLC: 421376727

The Normal Christian Life is a book by Watchman Nee first delivered as a series of addresses to Christian workers who were gathered in Denmark for special meetings in 1938 and 1939. The messages were first published chapter by chapter in the magazine A Witness and A Testimony published by Theodore Austin-Sparks. The first chapter was published in the November–December 1940 issue. This first publication of the book can be viewed in the original magazines on Austin-Sparks.Net. It was later published as a book by Witness and Testimony Publishers in August 1945 and advertised in the Sept/Oct edition of the "A Witness and A Testimony" magazine. The messages were also published as a book by Angus Kinnear in 1957 in Bombay, India.

In The Normal Christian Life, Watchman Nee presents foundational principles for the Christian life and walk drawing primarily from the Epistle to the Romans. The book is generally regarded by many as the first introduction of Watchman Nee to the Western world. As of 2009, this book has sold over 1 million copies and is available in many editions and languages.

== Subject ==
Watchman Nee based his speaking on the first eight chapters of the New Testament book of Romans. Nee takes the first eight chapters of Romans as a "self-contained unit" and divides these chapters into two parts: Romans 1:1 to 5:11 as part one and Romans 5:12 to 8:39 as part two. In the first part of Romans "sins" is given prominent attention and deals with the question of the sins man has committed before God. However, the second section deals with "sin," that is the inward nature, or inward working principle, within man that causes man to commit sin. Thus there is a difference between the acts of a sinner, sins, and the inward nature of a sinner, sin. Nee reveals that God's dual remedy is the Blood of the Lord Jesus Christ and the Cross of Christ. The Blood "deals with what we have done, whereas the Cross deals with what we are. The Blood disposes of our sins, while the Cross strikes at the root of our capacity for sin". As Nee progressively moves along in his book, he first touches upon the Blood and then focuses upon the Cross for the remainder of the book.^{[1]}

== Four Steps of the Cross ==
Watchman Nee gave four steps in which a Christian lives the Christian life. Basing from Romans 6:6, there is the need for the knowledge of the cross of Christ as a fact in our experience.

The second step is the matter of reckoning. Reckoning is the stating and considering of facts and promises that God has revealed to be true.

The third step is the matter of presenting to God. Coming to Romans 6:13, Watchman Nee says that Christians consecrate that which passed through death and resurrection in the new creation. In this way, Christians would no longer live to themselves but to Christ because He has the full authority over their lives.

The fourth step is the matter of Walking after the Spirit. Firstly, walking after the Spirit does not refer to our "working" but of dependence on God's working and operation. Secondly, it refers to subjection. This means that the Christian life is the yielding of all the dictates of our flesh and be of subjection to the Spirit.

== Influence ==
The Normal Christian Life is one of Nee's most well known books. It is considered by many to be a spiritual classic of Christianity. It has been reprinted and reissued in many editions and in many languages. The book's enduring appeal is not only due to Nee's exposition of Romans but also to the many illustrations, personal accounts, and anecdotes that Nee used. The Normal Christian Life has impacted millions of Christians since Nee spoke it and is a major contributor to the local churches movement today. Nee was recognized in the United States House of Representatives by Christopher H. Smith of New Jersey in 2009. He recognized Nee as having been one of the most influential Chinese Christians of his era. In the Congressional record, The Normal Christian Life is highlighted by Smith as being among his most popular and influential books.

== Contents ==
Preface

Preface to the English Edition

- Introduction
- Chapter 1: The Blood of Christ
- Chapter 2: The Cross of Christ
- Chapter 3: The Path of Progress: Knowing
- Chapter 4: The Path of Progress: Reckoning
- Chapter 5: The Divide of the Cross
- Chapter 6: The Path of Progress: Presenting Ourselves to God
- Chapter 7: The Eternal Purpose
- Chapter 8: The Holy Spirit
- Chapter 9: The Meaning and Value of Romans Seven
- Chapter 10: The Path of Progress: Walking in the Spirit
- Chapter 11: One Body in Christ
- Chapter 12: The Cross and the Soul Life
- Chapter 13: The Path of Progress: Bearing the Cross
- Chapter 14: The Goal of the Gospel

== Editions of The Normal Christian Life ==
There have been many editions of The Normal Christian Life throughout the years. The very first edition of the book was published in 1957 by Gospel Literature Service in Bombay, India, preceded by the publication of 9 of the messages in the A Witness and A Testimony magazines in 1940-42. Many editions were to follow:

- Paperback published June 28, 1979 by Christian Literature Crusade
- Paperback published December 9, 1997 by Tyndale House Publishers
- Hardcover published July 1, 2000 by Barbour Publishing
- Audio cassette published August 1, 2001 by Living Stream Ministry
- Audio CD published August 1, 2001 by Living Stream Ministry
- Paperback published October 1, 2005 by Kingsway Publications
- Hardcover published February 1, 2006 by Hendrickson Publishers
- Audio CD published June 1, 2006 Hovel Audio
- Paperback published May 29, 2008 by Wilder Publications
- Paperback published January 10, 2009 by CLC Publications
- ebook published January 13, 2009 by CLC Publications
- ebook published November 4, 2010 by Watchman Books
- ebook published October 28, 2010 by New Century Books
- Kindle Edition published April 7, 2011 by New Century books
- ebooks published April 8, 2011 by Century Books
- Paperback published 2012 by Living Stream Ministry
