= Dora Yu =

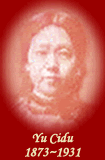

Dora Yu (Chinese: 余慈度; pinyin: Yú Cídù; 1873–1931) was a prominent Chinese evangelist in China in the first part of 20th century.

== Biography ==
Yu's father was an army surgeon who later trained as a pastor of the American Presbyterian Church; her parents died when she was 17 years old.

Yu was trained in western medicine in Suzhou, which she practiced briefly. She also took her medical training for work in evangelism. As a Bible woman, Yu and Josephine Campbell in 1897 became the first two female medical missionaries from the Southern Methodist Church to do work in Korea.

After working in Korea for six years, Yu returned to China and became a well-known revivalist preacher. She was invited to preach in many parts of China and, in 1927, spoke at the Keswick Convention in northern England. Her preaching was said to have had a great impact on many Chinese, who devoted their lives to Christian work. For instance, in a 1920 revival meeting in Church of Heavenly Peace, Fuzhou, Yu influenced a woman by the name of Lin Heping (Peace Lin) to have a conversion experience and, a few months later, also Lin's son, Watchman Nee, both of whom would become well-known revivalists themselves. Yu also influenced Nee's assistant Witness Lee, who went on to established the local churches group.

== Family ==
Yu was engaged to be married, but decided to break the engagement and remained single; she had one sister.

== Writings ==
- Yu, Dora. God's Dealings with Dora Yü, a Chinese messenger of the Cross. London: Morgan and Scott, 1928.

== See also ==
Margaret E. Barber
