= Gene Edwards (disambiguation) =

Eugene or Gene Edwards may refer to:

- Gene Edwards (1922–2022), American evangelist and pastor
- Red Edwards (Eugene Hoffman Edwards, 1904–1981), American football player and coach
- Gene Edwards (soccer executive) (1917–2000), American sports administrator

== See also ==
- David Eugene Edwards (born 1968), American musician
- Jeanne Edwards (1928–2011), American politician
