= Gene Edwards =

American Christian pastor (1932–2022)

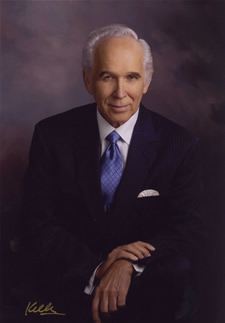
- Born: July 18, 1932; Commerce, Texas, U.S.
- Died: December 9, 2022 (aged 90)
- Occupation: Protestant Christian Church Planter
- Website: http://www.geneedwards.com/

Earl Eugene Edwards (July 18, 1932 – December 9, 2022) was an American house church planter, a Christian author, and a Southern Baptist pastor and evangelist. A graduate of Southwestern Baptist Theological Seminary, he was an outspoken proponent of the house church concept in the United States.

== Early life ==
Gene Edwards was born the second son of J.C. "Blackie" Edwards, an oil field roughneck from Louisiana, and Gladys Brewer Edwards, a school teacher. Edwards spent the first six years of his life in Commerce, Texas, until his father was relocated to Bay City, Texas, where his family lived together until Edwards turned 13. During his elementary school years, it was discovered that he had a pronounced learning disability (later to be labeled as dyslexia). A third generation Southern Baptist, the painfully shy Edwards officially joined the First Baptist Church of Bay City at age seven, although he would not be "born again" for another ten years.

After attending the San Marcos Baptist Academy for a year, Edwards enrolled in East Texas State University at the age of 15. On July 17, 1949, during his junior year at ETSU, he experienced a dramatic conversion to faith in Christ. The following year was a formative one, because the Baptist Student Union was unexpectedly left without a leader, so that the students themselves led the activities of the group for a time. This kind of open, spontaneous, lay-led environment left a lasting impression on him.

Graduating from college in January 1951, he enrolled at Southwestern Baptist Theological Seminary in Fort Worth, Texas, the following Monday morning. After one semester at Southwestern, Edwards was chosen to study for a year in Switzerland at the International Baptist Seminary in Zürich (now IBTS in Prague). While there, he studied Anabaptist history with keen interest, even visiting the locations where significant leaders of the Radical Reformation lived and died. This love of history and of the stories of the Dissenting Church would become a central facet of his later ministry. Upon returning to Fort Worth, he completed seminary and married Helen Rogers, formerly a secretary for the Baptist Sunday School Board in Nashville, Tennessee. The ceremony was performed by Frank Laubach and broadcast on NBC for a segment called "Bride and Groom."

== Early ministry ==
Edwards graduated from Southwestern Seminary in 1954. He then spent five years pastoring two churches: England Grove Baptist Church (1954–56) in Commerce, Texas and Tabernacle Baptist Church (1957–58) in Pickton, Texas. Although a dynamic communicator, his unconventional delivery, born out of an oilfield roughneck upbringing, made him an ill fit for the traditional pastorate. Turning to itinerant evangelism, he began holding citywide meetings to train churches in door-to-door evangelism. By 1962, he had published two books on "soul winning," one of which would become recommended reading at Southwestern Seminary. As his popularity grew, he began to receive invitations from national denominations and parachurch organizations to assist them in implementing programs for personal evangelism. In April 1961, he was invited to speak at the annual gathering of the National Association of Evangelicals.

About the same time, Edwards had begun meeting with a small group of Christians in Tyler, Texas, in order to read The Normal Christian Life, written by Watchman Nee and newly published in English. Nee's presentation of the believer's identification with Christ in death and resurrection deeply resonated with him, and in time he grew to believe that Evangelical churches in America had fundamentally strayed from the spiritual vitality of the first-century churches. In November 1961, at the height of his popularity, he ended his evangelistic ministry, canceling all future engagements.

Edwards spent a year in intensive study of early Church history, then began to seek out anyone who had known Watchman Nee and his church planting ministry in China. He first sought the company of Beta Sheirich, a former co-worker of Nee's who had returned from China to a fellowship in Louisville, Kentucky. While meeting in a conference with this group, he contracted disseminated histoplasmosis, which nearly took his life and confined him to bed for the next year. Pain and illness from this disease would haunt Edwards for the remainder of his life. In August 1965, he moved his family from Texas, to the Los Angeles area, where he soon began teaching high school (a profession he would remain in for the next 10 years).

== Church Planting and Writing Ministry ==
In January 1969, Edwards was asked to speak impromptu at a conference at UCLA featuring a panel of former Campus Crusade directors. He delivered a message on the "Eternal Purpose of God." A few weeks later, a former Campus Crusade group from Santa Barbara invited him to come and speak to them. The group met in Isla Vista (a college community near the University of California, Santa Barbara) and numbered about 20 (in its early days), eventually growing to about 150. It had frequent visitors and was characterized by gracious hospitality.

Over the following three decades, Edwards began writing books on "the deeper Christian life," with a particular emphasis on living in Christian community. His earliest books and tapes were carried by his own publishing house, which he named Christian Books Publishing House, later changing the name to SeedSowers. Besides his own books on devotional living and Christian community, Edwards also edited and republished out-of-print works by a selection of quietist Catholic mystics including Madame Guyon, François Fénelon, Miguel de Molinos, as well as Brother Lawrence. In 1991, Tyndale Publishers began publishing several of Edwards' books, bringing him international popularity. A Tale of Three Kings, which has sold over half a million copies, became standard reading for ministerial students in seminaries and universities.

Edwards’ books and tapes laid the groundwork for his own house church movement that began in the United States in the 1970s. Groups and churches that he planted pattern their gatherings around primitive Christian practices such as meeting in homes, writing their own songs, and meeting in an open, participatory style. These groups aim for a distributed ministry model in which no one in the group possesses greater authority than any other so that all will be encouraged to function and speak in the meeting.

== Theological distinctives ==
- Organic Leadership -- In Our Mission (alternative title: Climb the Highest Mountain), Edwards argues that the administrative organization of people is unnatural and a result of the fall of humankind:

"God invented organization for angels and not for man. Angels, if you please, turned around and super-imposed their civilization - their systematization, their angelic organizational life, their culture - on man."

- Shared Contemplative Prayer Life – Most of the well-known quietist mystics focused on the individual's walk with God rather than the collective prayer life of the church. And while much of Protestant theology marginalizes mysticism, Edwards seeks to integrate it into the daily life of the groups with which he works. As one writer put it, Edwards "pulls that mysticism out of the desert and into the living room."

== Books ==
(Earlier publication dates indicate Seedsowers/Christian Books releases except where otherwise indicated)

- Revolution: The Story of the Early Church (1974)
- A Tale of Three Kings (1980) (Tyndale 1992)
- The Inward Journey (1982) (Tyndale 1993)
- Our Mission (1984) (alt. title: Climb the Highest Mountain)
- The Divine Romance (1984) (Tyndale 1992)
- Letters to a Devastated Christian (1984) (Tyndale 1992)
- Preventing a Church Split (1987)
- The Highest Life (1989) (Tyndale 1991)
- The Prisoner in the Third Cell (Tyndale 1991)
- Dear Lillian (1991)
- The Secret to the Christian Life (1991) (Tyndale 1993)
- How to Meet in Homes (1993)
- Crucified by Christians (1994) (alt. Exquisite Agony)
- The Americanization of Christianity (1994)
- The Chronicles of the Door (alt. The Chronicles of Heaven)
  - The Birth (1990) (Tyndale 1991)
  - The Beginning (Tyndale 1992)
  - The Escape (Tyndale 1993)
  - The Triumph (Tyndale 1995)
  - The Return (Tyndale 1996)
- Overlooked Christianity (1997)
- Rethinking Elders (1998)
- Beyond Radical (1999)
- The First Century Diaries
  - The Silas Diary (Tyndale 1998)
  - The Titus Diary (Tyndale 1999)
  - The Timothy Diary (Tyndale 2000)
  - The Priscilla Diary (Tyndale 2001)
  - The Gaius Diary (Tyndale 2002)
- 100 Days in the Secret Place (Destiny Image 2002)
- Christ Before Creation (2003)
- Your Lord is a Blue Collar Worker (2004)
- The Day I Was Crucified (Destiny Image 2005)
- The Christian Woman... Set Free (2005)
- Stories I Love to Tell (2018)
