= Church of Heavenly Peace, Fuzhou =

Church in Fujian, China

Coordinates: 26°02′50.65″N 119°18′25.27″E

Church of Heavenly Peace
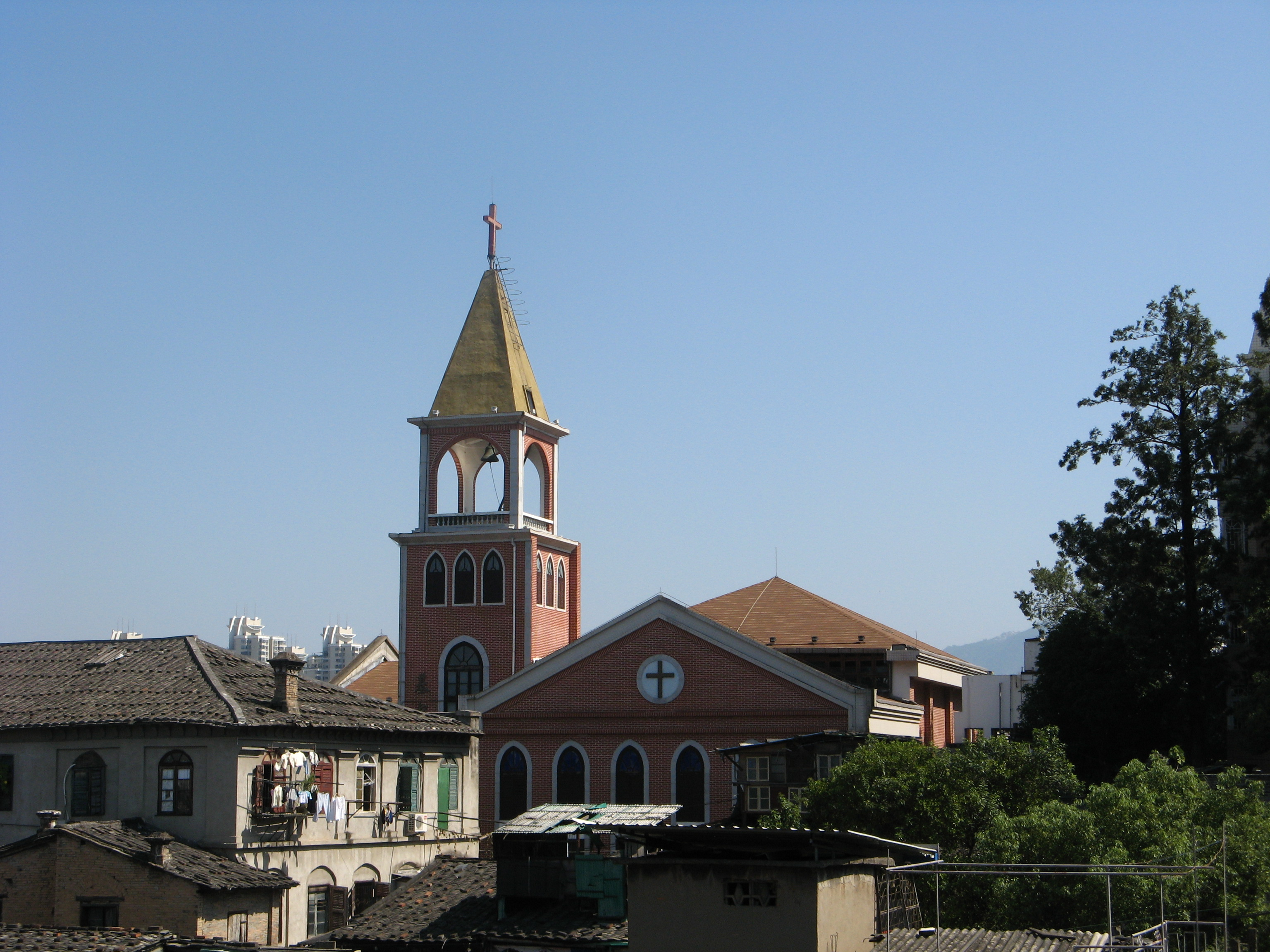
- Church of Heavenly Peace
- Location: Fuzhou
- Country: China
- Denomination: Methodist

History
- Status: Church
- Founder: Robert S. Maclay
- Dedicated: October 18, 1856

Architecture
- Functional status: Active

Church of Heavenly Peace (Chinese: 天安堂; pinyin: Tiān'āntáng; Foochow Romanized: Tiĕng-ăng-dòng), also known as Church of Heavenly Rest or Tien Ang Tong, is a Christian church in Fuzhou, China.

== Location ==
The church stands on Cangqian Hill (仓前山) in the Cangshan District, facing the River Min. It is named after Tian'anli (天安里) Street, where it is located. The Chinese word Tian'an (天安) means Heavenly Peace or Heavenly Rest.

== History ==
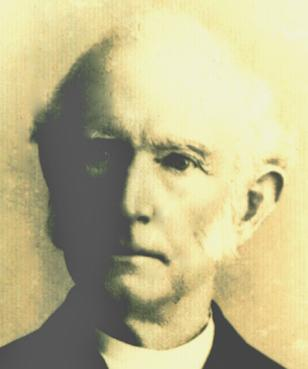
R.S. Maclay (1824 - 1907), the church founder

The history of Heavenly Peace Church can be traced back to the time when the American Methodist Episcopal Mission first set up their Mission in East Asia.

Having chosen Fuzhou as the first location of their mission field in China, the Methodist Episcopal Mission sent out two young missionaries, Judson D. Collins and Moses C. White, on April 15, 1847, who reached the port on September 6 and were soon followed by Robert S. Maclay who arrived on April 15 the next year. After the difficult first years on Zhongzhou Island (中洲岛) on the Min River, they finally moved south and settled on Cangqian Hill in the 1850s. Gratified and encouraged by the successful completion of their first church (also the first Methodist church in East Asia) Ching Sing Tong (真神堂) dedicated on August 3, 1856, the Methodist Episcopal Mission immediately went on to purchase another site which was close to the mission compound on Cangqian Hill, just in front of the lot occupied by the superintendent Rev. Robert S. Maclay. In view of the increasing number of foreigners in Fuzhou, the Mission decided to erect there a church with two audience rooms, one for speakers of the Fuzhou dialect and the other for English worship.

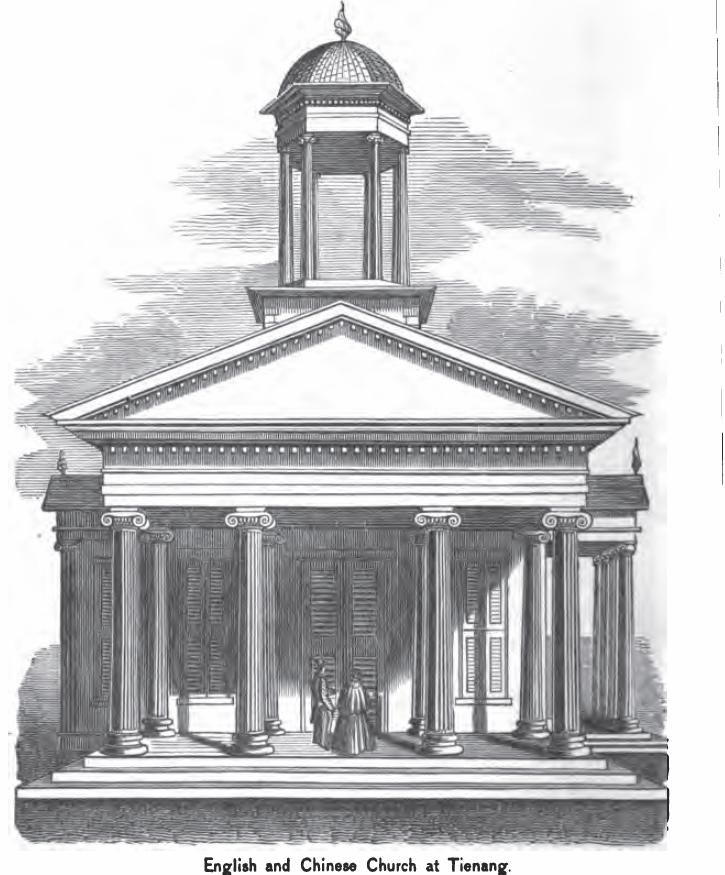
Illustration of Heavenly Peace Church in the 1850s

The Chinese portion of the church was dedicated on October 18, 1856. On that day Lyman Birt Peet, Justus Doolittle and Charles Hartwell of the American Board of Commissioners for Foreign Missions also attended the services. The edifice was built of brick, resting on a stone foundation. After the English portion was dedicated on December 28 of the same year, the Church of Heavenly Peace became the first Christian church erected in Fuzhou, and also the first Methodist church in China, which conducted services in English. The services on that occasion were conducted by Rev. Erastus Wentworth who delivered a discourse on 1 Kings 9:3 to the foreign audience.

On June 14, 1857, ten years after their arrival, the Methodist Episcopal Mission baptized their first Chinese convert, a Fuzhounese tradesman named Ting Ang (陈安). In the early 1860s Heavenly Peace Church was put under the charge of Rev. Otis Gibson. In 1866, the first annual meeting of the Methodist Episcopal Mission in China was held in the church, dividing the field of Fuzhou into four parishes and establishing new mission fields in Hokchiang, Xinghua, Gutian, Yanping, Jiujiang and Beijing. On November 22, 1869, the first native Methodist deacons, known as the "Seven Golden Lampstands", were ordained in this church.

In 1877, Church of Heavenly Peace officially became the center of Foochow Conference. From 1877 to 1947, 55 out of the total 59 annual meetings had been held in Church of Heavenly Peace. In 1897, a renovation of the church was carried out with the fund raised by Rev. Uong De Gi (黄治基) to increase its seating capacity to as much as 1000.

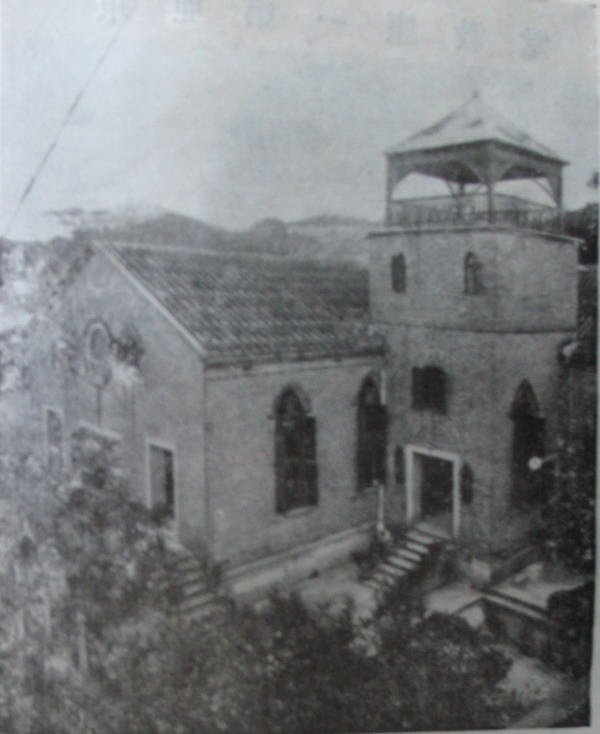
Heavenly Peace Church in the early 20th century

During the first half of the 20th century, the Church of Heavenly Peace had continued to play an instrumental role in the process of making a modern China. In 1900, Rev. Wong Nai Siong (黄乃裳) called upon more than 600 native Fuzhounese, mostly church members, to migrate to Sibu, Sarawak in Malaysia. In 1913, the Chinese leader Sun Yat-sen (孙中山) paid a visit to the church and gave an inspiring speech on the anti-Manchu movement and the Xinhai Revolution. In 1920, the female evangelist Dora Yu (余慈度) held a revival meeting, which nurtured the spiritual life of Watchman Nee (倪柝声) who was later to become one of the greatest Chinese church leaders. In the 1930s, Dr. John Sung (宋尚节) led several revival movements in this church. In 1947, the centennial of the Methodist Church in the Republic of China was also celebrated here.

After the communist revolution in 1949, the Methodist Mission was forced to move to Taiwan with the Kuomintang government, and Church of Heavenly Peace shared with other Chinese churches the same fate of being affiliated to the Three-Self Patriotic Movement, subjugated to Communist control. Since the beginning of the Cultural Revolution, it was occupied by the government and all religious activities were strictly banned. The church was reopened in 1980 after the new religious policy was put into effect, but was, however, in a dilapidated state of disrepair.

== Today ==
The reconstruction project of Heavenly Peace Church began in 1996 and was completed three years later, at a total cost of ¥3 million. Dedicated on October 30, 1999, the newly built church stands upon a higher foundation and looks more prominent than before, with a floor area of 2,300m^{2}.

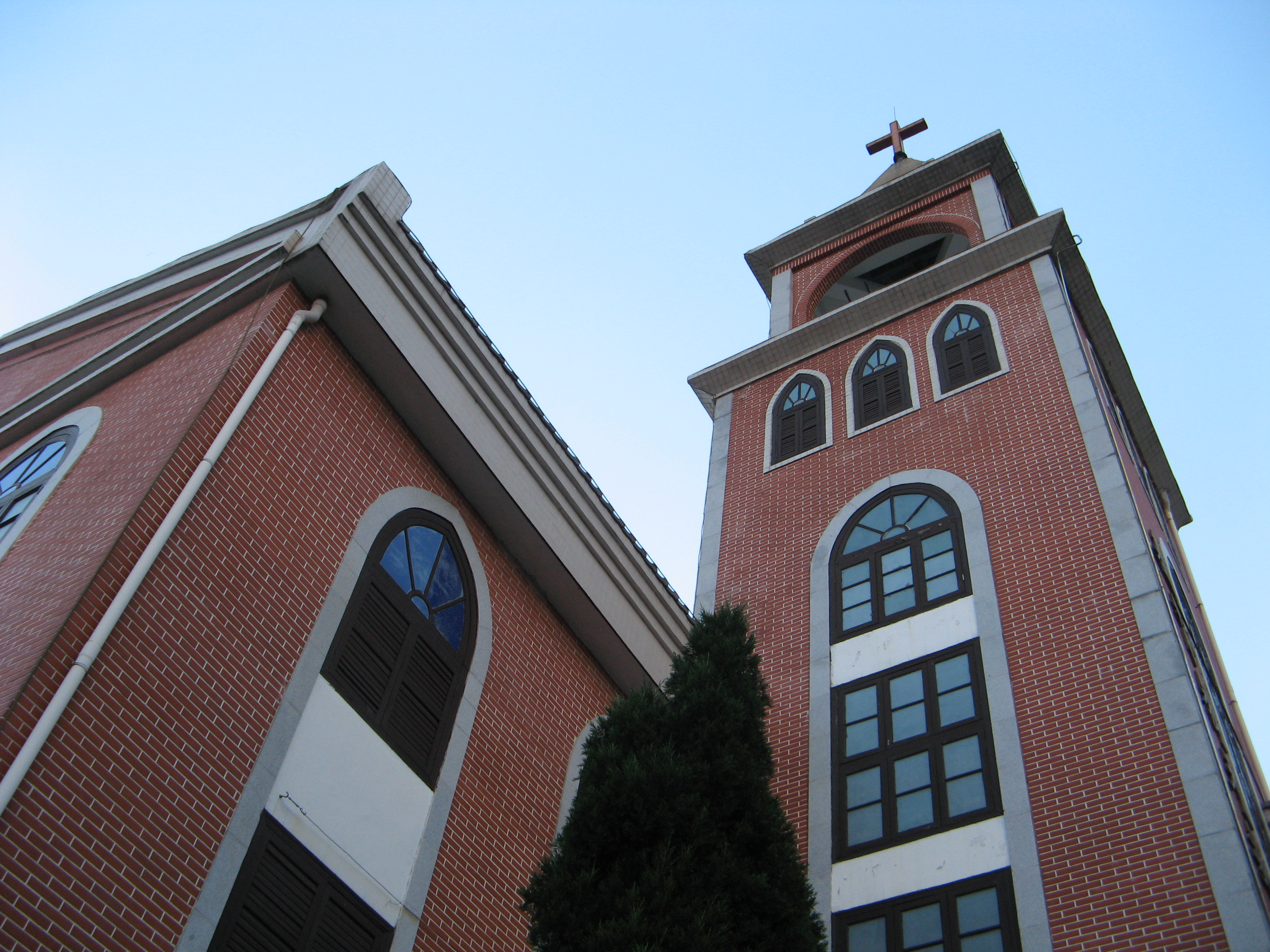
Looking up to the bell tower

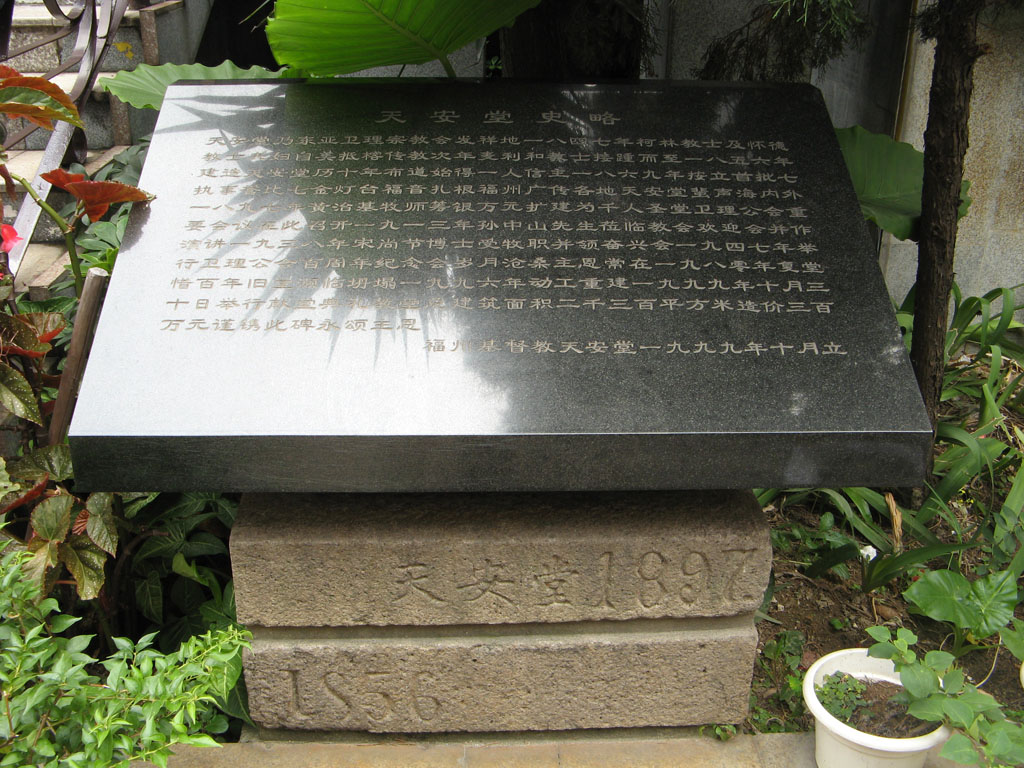
The inscription on the cornerstone tells the brief history of the church

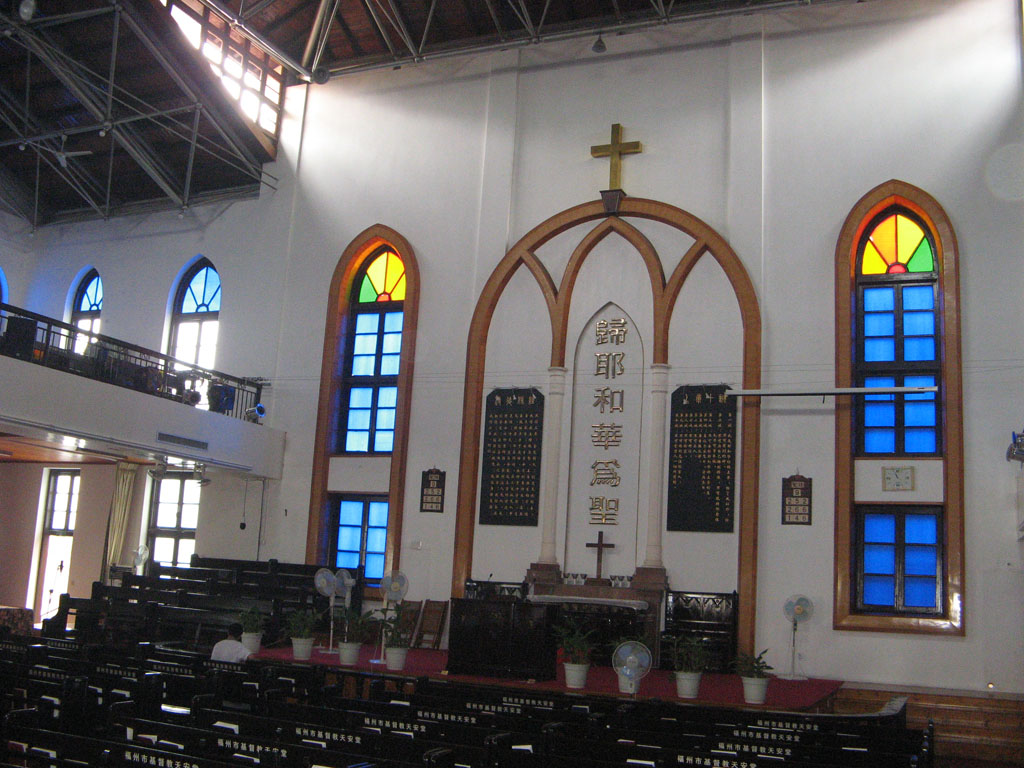
Interior of Heavenly Peace Church
