= Gulin (surname) =

Gulin or Gulín is a surname. Notable people with the surname include:

- Ángeles Gulín (1939–2002), Spanish operatic soprano
- Eelis Gulin (1893–1975), Finnish professor and bishop
- Lindsay Gulin (born 1976), American minor league baseball pitcher
- Maksim Gulin (born 1997), Russian politician
- Tonči Gulin (1938–1999), Croatian football player
