= Recovery Version =

Modern English bible translation

Holy Bible Recovery Version
- NT published: 1985
- Complete Bible published: 1999
- Authorship: Witness Lee and the editorial section of the Living Stream Ministry
- Derived from: American Standard Version (ASV) 1901
- Textual basis: OT: Biblia Hebraica Stuttgartensia (BHS; revised 1990 edition) NT: Novum Testamentum Graece (Nestle-Aland 26th edition)
- Translation type: Formal equivalence
- Reading level: High School
- Version revision: 2003, 2016
- Publisher: Living Stream Ministry
- Copyright: © 2003 Living Stream Ministry
- Religious affiliation: Local Churches (affiliation)
- Genesis 1:1–3 In the beginning God created the heavens and the earth. But the earth became waste and emptiness, and darkness was on the surface of the deep, and the Spirit of God was brooding upon the surface of the waters. And God said, Let there be light; and there was light. John 3:16 For God so loved the world that He gave His only begotten Son, that everyone who believes into Him would not perish, but would have eternal life.

The Recovery Version is a modern English translation of the Bible from the original languages, published by Living Stream Ministry, ministry of Witness Lee and Watchman Nee. It is the commonly used translation of Local Churches.

The New Testament was published in 1985 with study aids, and was revised in 1991. Text-only editions of the New Testament and of the complete Bible became available in 1993 and 1999, respectively. The full study Bible was published in 2003. The name was chosen to reflect the restorationist theology of the authors, who believe many of the doctrines in their translation (such as justification by faith alone) were lost by the church before being recovered later.

== Translation ==
The Recovery Version is a recent translation of the Bible from the revised 1980 edition of the Hebrew Scriptures, Biblia Hebraica Stuttgartensia, and the Nestle-Åland Greek text as found in Novum Testamentum Graece (26th edition). The translators believe that the understanding of the Bible has progressed in the past two thousand years, in part due to "philological and exegetical scholarship that makes more precise the meaning of the biblical words or phrases or practices" and in part due to an accumulation of Christian experience. This understanding forms the basis of this translation, with guidance from major authoritative English versions.

The Recovery Version claims to avoid biases and inaccurate judgments and to express the message of the Bible in English as accurately as possible. As such, it departs from traditional renderings in certain passages where the translators judged theological precision to be at stake. Its translation is essentially literal/word-for-word/formal equivalent, seeking to preserve the wording of the original Hebrew or Greek text and the personal style of each biblical writer. Its translation is intended as transparent - interpretive ambiguities present in the original text are left unresolved in this translation for the readers to consider. The Recovery Version renders the Tetragrammaton as Jehovah throughout the Old Testament.

== Study aids ==
- A subject line at the beginning of each book summarizes its spiritual significance.
- A detailed outline precedes each book and is embedded throughout the text, providing an overview of the structure of the book.
- Footnotes stress the translators' view of revelation of the truth, the spiritual light, and the supply of life more than history, geography, and persons. The New Testament footnotes were written by Lee, while those of the Old Testament were compiled from his literary corpus by the editorial team. Footnotes also indicate more literal (but less readable) translations, valid alternative translations, alternative ways of reading the original text, and alternative translations found in other English versions or in academic scholarship. Often, the clarity forfeited in a literal translation of the original text is addressed and compensated for in the footnotes. The Recovery Version contains over 15,000 footnotes.
- Marginal cross references lead to other verses with the same expressions and facts and to other matters related to the spiritual revelation in the Word.
- Maps show the ancient Near East in Old Testament times, Israel in Old Testament times, and the Holy Land in New Testament times and document the journeys of Paul.
- Charts present the characteristics of the different sections of the New Testament and organize details such as the prophetic seventy weeks in Daniel, the rapture of the believers, and the coming of Christ, in a visual timeline.

== Textual comparison ==
Comparison of select verses with other versions
	King James Version	English Standard Version	New International Version	American Standard Version	New American Standard Bible	Darby Translation	Recovery Version	Differences
Gen. 4:7b	And if thou doest not well, sin lieth at the door. And unto thee shall be his desire, and thou shalt rule over him.	And if you do not do well, sin is crouching at the door. Its desire is contrary to you, but you must rule over it.	But if you do not do what is right, sin is crouching at your door; it desires to have you, but you must master it.	And if thou doest not well, sin coucheth at the door; and unto thee shall be its desire; but do thou rule over it.	And if you do not do well, sin is crouching at the door; and its desire is for you, but you must master it.	And if thou doest not well, sin lieth at the door; and unto thee [shall be] his desire, and thou shalt rule over him.	And if you do not do well, sin is crouching at the door; and his desire is for you, but you must rule over him.	The RcV retains the masculine of the Hebrew possessive suffixes (i.e., "his, him") and takes them as referring to Satan, personified here as sin. So also Speiser and HarperCollins.
Ps. 51:11	Cast me not away from thy presence; and take not thy holy spirit from me.	Cast me not away from your presence, and take not your Holy Spirit from me.	Do not cast me from your presence or take your Holy Spirit from me.	Cast me not away from thy presence; And take not thy holy Spirit from me.	Do not cast me away from Your presence And do not take Your Holy Spirit from me.	Cast me not away from thy presence, and take not the spirit of thy holiness from me.	Do not cast me from Your presence, and do not take the Spirit of Your holiness away from me.	The RcV reserves the revelation and function of the Holy Spirit, properly speaking, to the NT. Here, and in Isa. 63:10-11, a different title is used to indicate that distinction. So also Andrew Murray, NJB, et al.
Mat. 9:16	No man putteth a piece of new cloth unto an old garment, for that which is put in to fill it up taketh from the garment, and the rent is made worse.	No one puts a piece of unshrunk cloth on an old garment, for the patch tears away from the garment, and a worse tear is made.	No one sews a patch of unshrunk cloth on an old garment, for the patch will pull away from the garment, making the tear worse.	And no man putteth a piece of undressed cloth upon an old garment; for that which should fill it up taketh from the garment, and a worse rent is made.	But no one puts a patch of unshrunk cloth on an old garment; for [b]the patch pulls away from the garment, and a worse tear results.	But no one puts a patch of new cloth on an old garment, for its filling up takes from the garment and a worse rent takes place.	No one puts a patch of unfulled cloth on an old garment, for that which fills it up pulls away from the garment, and a worse tear is made.	"The Greek word is formed with not and to card or comb wool. Thus, the word means uncarded, unsteamed and unwashed, unfinished, unfulled, untreated." So also Lattimore and DB Hart.
John 1:14	And the Word was made flesh, and dwelt among us, (and we beheld his glory, the glory as of the only begotten of the Father,) full of grace and truth.	And the Word became flesh and dwelt among us, and we have seen his glory, glory as of the only Son from the Father, full of grace and truth.	The Word became flesh and made his dwelling among us. We have seen his glory, the glory of the one and only Son, who came from the Father, full of grace and truth.	And the Word became flesh, and dwelt among us (and we beheld his glory, glory as of the only begotten from the Father), full of grace and truth.	And the Word became flesh, and dwelt among us; and we saw His glory, glory as of the only Son from the Father, full of grace and truth.	And the Word became flesh, and dwelt among us (and we have contemplated his glory, a glory as of an only-begotten with a father), full of grace and truth;	And the Word became flesh and tabernacled among us (and we beheld His glory, glory as of the only Begotten from the Father), full of grace and reality.	The RcV follows many commentaries in seeing this verb (skēnoō) as an allusion to the OT wilderness dwelling place of God, the tabernacle (skēnē), indicating that Jesus Christ is the fulfillment and reality of the tabernacle.
John 3:16	For God so loved the world, that he gave his only begotten Son, that whosoever believeth in him should not perish, but have everlasting life.	For God so loved the world, that he gave his only Son, that whoever believes in him should not perish but have eternal life.	For God so loved the world that he gave his one and only Son, that whoever believes in him shall not perish but have eternal life.	For God so loved the world that he gave his one and only Son, that whoever believes in him shall not perish but have eternal life.	For God so loved the world, that He gave His only begotten Son, that whoever believes in Him shall not perish, but have eternal life.	For God so loved the world, that he gave his only-begotten Son, that whosoever believes on him may not perish, but have life eternal.	For God so loved the world that He gave His only begotten Son, that every one who believes into Him would not perish, but would have eternal life.	The RcV takes the preposition (εἰς) in its strict sense, indicating that faith incorporates people into Christ. Note ad loc.: “To believe Him is to believe that He is true and real, but to believe into Him is to receive Him and be united with Him as one.” (Note: The Greek word translated "in" in the KJV, ESV, and NIV and "into" in the Recovery Version is "εἰς," meaning "into." Also see Nestle, Erwin. Novum Testamentum Graece Stuttgart: Deutsche Bibelgesellschaft, 2006. Print.)
Rom. 8:15	For ye have not received the spirit of bondage again to fear; but ye have received the Spirit of adoption, whereby we cry, Abba, Father.	For you did not receive the spirit of slavery to fall back into fear, but you have received the Spirit of adoption as sons, by whom we cry, "Abba! Father!"	The Spirit you received does not make you slaves, so that you live in fear again; rather, the Spirit you received brought about your adoption to sonship. And by him we cry, "Abba, Father".	For ye received not the spirit of bondage again unto fear; but ye received the spirit of adoption, whereby we cry, Abba, Father.	For you have not received a spirit of slavery leading to fear again, but you have received a spirit of adoption as sons by which we cry out, "Abba! Father!"	For ye have not received a spirit of bondage again for fear, but ye have received a spirit of adoption, whereby we cry, Abba, Father.	For you have not received a spirit of slavery bringing you into fear again, but you have received a spirit of sonship in which we cry, Abba, Father!	The RcV translates υἱοθεσία as sonship. So also RSV and NT Wright's NTFE. Note ad loc.: "Sonship... includes the life, the position, the living, the enjoyment, the birthright, the inheritance, and the manifestation of a son."
Phl. 4:13	I can do all things through Christ which strengtheneth me.	I can do all things through him who strengthens me.	I can do all this through him who gives me strength.	I can do all things in him that strengtheneth me.	I can do all things through Him who strengthens me.	I have strength for all things in him that gives me power.	I am able to do all things in Him who empowers me.	G1722 εν (en) means in, etc. ἐνδυναμοῦντί (endynamounti) means makes dynamic inwardly. Christ dwells in us (Col.1:27). He empowers us, makes us dynamic from within, not from without. By such inward empowering Paul was able to do all things in Christ.
Col. 2:9	For in him dwelleth all the fulness of the Godhead bodily.	For in him the whole fullness of deity dwells bodily.	For in Christ all the fullness of the Deity lives in bodily form.	For in him dwelleth all the fulness of the Godhead bodily.	For in Him all the fullness of Deity dwells in bodily form.	For in him dwells all the fulness of the Godhead bodily.	For in Him dwells all the fullness of the Godhead bodily.	{G2330} θεότητος, translated into "Godhead," is unique in the NT. In Rom.1:20, {G2305} θειότης is translated divinity or godhood. Here Paul is speaking of the essential and personal deity as belonging to Christ. So Bengel: "Not the divine attributes, but the divine nature." "Godhead" refers to deity, which is different from the divine characteristics manifested by the created things (Rom.1:20).

== Other languages ==
There are complete and partial editions of the Holy Bible Recovery Version in other languages, including Chinese (恢復本), French (Version Recouvrement), German (Wiedererlangungs-Übersetzung), Polish (Przekład Odzyskiwania), Indonesian (Alkitab Versi Pemulihan), Japanese (回復訳), Korean (회복역), Portuguese (Versão Restauração), Russian (Восстановительный перевод), Spanish (Versión Recobro), Tagalog (Salin sa Pagbabawi), and Cebuano (Hubad Pahiuli). The Recovery Version New Testament is translated into Indian languages like Telugu, Tamil, Mizo and Malayalam; the Hindi translation is in progress. Translating into different languages requires translating from Greek to the language, and the footnotes from English to the desired language.

== See also ==
- The Lord's Recovery
