= Spiritual Counterfeits Project =

Christian evangelical parachurch organisation

The Spiritual Counterfeits Project (SCP) is a Christian evangelical parachurch organization located in Pasadena, California. Since its inception in the early 1970s, it has been involved in the fields of Christian apologetics and the Christian counter-cult movement. In its role as a think tank, SCP has sought to publish evangelically based analyses of new religious movements, New Age movements, and alternative spiritualities in light of broad cultural trends. SCP has also been at the center of two controversial U.S. lawsuits, one involving church-state issues (Malnak v. Yogi) and the other being a religious defamation case (Lee et al. v. Duddy et al.). It published the SCP Journal and Newsletter.

== Background ==
The SCP began as a ministry within the Christian World Liberation Front, an outreach to students at the University of California, Berkeley. It was founded by Brooks Alexander, David Fetcho (who named the ministry), and Bill Squires. Both Alexander and Fetcho were converted to Christianity from the counterculture. Alexander had participated in the psychedelic drug usage of the counterculture, was an initiate of Transcendental Meditation, and lived in the famous Haight-Ashbury community in San Francisco. Fetcho had been involved with the Ananda Marga Yoga Society before converting to Christianity.

== History of SCP ==
In 1973 Brooks Alexander and others distributed Christian leaflets at Millennium '73, a festival held at the Houston Astrodome by Guru Maharaj Ji's Divine Light Mission. That same year, Alexander, Fetcho and David Haddon launched a grass-roots campaign to oppose the practice of Transcendental Meditation in American public high schools. In 1975 the SCP was formally incorporated as an "independent Christian nonprofit organization."

The four primary purposes of SCP included: "1. To research today's spiritual movements and critique them biblically. 2. To equip Christians with the knowledge, analysis, and discernment that will enable them to understand the significance of today's spiritual explosion. 3. To suggest a Christian response which engages the church with all levels of situation. 4. To bring the good news of Jesus Christ and extend a hand of rescue to those in psycho-spiritual bondage."

=== Transcendental Meditation ===
The campaign against Transcendental Meditation (TM) was premised on the grounds that transcendental meditation represented itself as a non-religious activity and was promoted as the Science of Creative Intelligence (SCI). The SCP maintained that transcendental meditation was not religiously neutral, and that its SCI was based on Maharishi Mahesh Yogi's Hindu faith. The SCP's Right On newsletter was the first to publish portions of the TM teacher's manual, including details of the Puja ceremony.

The focal point for an anti-Transcendental Meditation campaign was a civil action lawsuit No. 76-431 in the US District Court of New Jersey. The lawsuit Malnak v. Yogi contested whether TM was religious or not, and if the former then it could not be taught in U.S. public high schools. The plaintiffs, which included the SCP, presented evidence to show that puja was religious in nature and the practice of meditation presented as SCI involved chanting Hindu mantras. SCP's Brooks Alexander and Bill Squires, along with SCP's attorney Michael Woodruff, moved into the Malnak's home and provided research, fundraising, and legal support, respectively.

Justice Curtis Meanor who presided over the case concluded that Transcendental Meditation and SCI are "religious in nature within the context of the Establishment Clause of the First Amendment of the United States Constitution, and the teaching thereof in the New Jersey public schools is therefore unconstitutional." On February 2, 1979, the Third Circuit of the United States Court of Appeals upheld the lower court's ruling. The success of this campaign catapulted the SCP into prominence among evangelical Christians in North America and internationally.

=== Local church controversy ===
In 1977, SCP published an 80-page booklet called The God-Men: Witness Lee and the Local Church. An expanded edition was published first in 1979 in German as Die Sonderlehre by Schwengeler-Verlag and then in 1981 in English as The God-Men: An Inquiry into Witness Lee and the Local Church by InterVarsity Press. In the book, SCP alleged that the Local Church was both theologically and sociologically deviant. The dispute between the Local Church and SCP escalated into a lawsuit for defamation that was filed in Oakland, California in December 1980 and known as Lee et al. v. Duddy et al.

According to Bill Squires, the four and a half years of pre-trial preparations and depositions involved expenditure that brought SCP into legal debt with their defense lawyers. The parties were to appear in court on March 4, 1985, to schedule the start of the defamation trial. Squires said, "The law firm representing us withdrew from the case" and SCP decided to file for Chapter 11 bankruptcy protection. Squires stated, "That move imposed an immediate stay on the plaintiffs' action against us, thus ending the financial drain of litigation. On that day, SCP, while continuing its larger ministry, officially dropped out of the lawsuit." However, SCP’s version of these events has been disputed. While SCP's Chapter 11 filing was proceeding through California bankruptcy court, action against the German publisher and the second edition's primary author proceeded, resulting in a finding that the book was "in all major respects false, defamatory and unprivileged, and, therefore, libelous." The judge’s award of US$11.9 million in damages was to that date the largest awarded in a libel case.

=== Post-litigation history ===
In the aftermath of the litigation, SCP sharply reduced staff and services. In 1989, the entire editorial staff and many other staff members left, some over what they perceived as a radical shift in SCP’s ideology. In 2013, SCP left its office in Berkeley because of severe financial problems and established a virtual office in Pasadena, California. Tal Brooke moved to Hawaii but continued as SCP's president and editor of its newsletter. On July 15, 2021, Tal Brooke died of a stroke while in New Zealand, and SCP Vice-President Mark Harris took over as president and editor of SCP.
