= Local churches (affiliation) =

Christian movement started by Watchman Nee and Witness Lee

The Local Church
- Classification: Christian
- Orientation: Nondenominational
- Polity: Congregationalist
- Associations: Living Stream Ministry
- Founder: Watchman Nee
- Origin: 1920s China

The local churches are a Christian group which was started in China in the 1920s and have spread globally. The basic organizing principle of the local churches is that there should be only one Christian church in each city, a principle that was first articulated by Watchman Nee (Ni Tuosheng) in a 1926 exposition of the seven churches in Asia in Revelation 1:11. The local churches do not take a name, but some outsiders referred to the group as the "Little Flock" as they sang from a hymnal entitled Hymns for the Little Flock.

From early on, members of this group emphasized alleged personal experiences of Christ and the establishment of a pattern of church practice according to the examples [e.g. church in Jerusalem] found in the New Testament. Though assemblies identifying as "local churches" can be found worldwide, there are no definitive statistics available on membership, partly because the largest number of members are in China. Estimates range from 500,000 to 2,000,000 members worldwide.

== History ==
=== Origins ===
During the May Fourth Movement, Chinese intellectuals and students criticized Christianity for its associations with Western imperialism. Responding to these perspectives, some Chinese Protestant leaders began indigenous church movements seeking to establish Protestant churches in China that were independent of foreign finances, control, or leadership. The Local Church movement arose in this post-May Fourth context.

Nee began to meet outside of denominations with a small group of believers in 1922. At an early age, Nee committed his life to Christian ministry and began to publish his works on the Christian faith and on church practice after moving to Shanghai in 1927.

Nee appreciated the teachings of the Plymouth Brethren, especially John Nelson Darby, and many of Nee's teachings, including not taking a name, plural eldership, disavowal of a clergy-laity distinction, and worship centered around the Lord's Supper, mirror that source. From 1930 to 1935, there was communication internationally between the local churches and the branch of the Plymouth Brethren Christian Church associated with James Taylor, Sr. The Taylor group of Exclusive Brethren saw the churches in China as a parallel work of God. However, Nee and other Chinese leaders disagreed with their prohibition of celebrating The Lord's Supper with Christians outside of their own meetings. Matters came to a head when Exclusive Brethren leaders discovered that Nee had broken bread with non-Brethren Christians, including T. Austin-Sparks in London and Thornton Stearns in Hartford, during a 1933 visit to the United Kingdom and North America. After a series of letters exchanged between leaders in New York, London, and Shanghai over a two-year period, on 31 August 1935, the Exclusive Brethren in London wrote to Shanghai terminating their fellowship.

Nee's seminal works expounding his view of local churches—The Assembly Life and Concerning Our Missions—were written against the background of his experience with the Exclusive Brethren. Nee taught that there should only be one church in every city, that Christians should meet together simply as believers living in the same city regardless of differences in doctrine or practice. Nee believed that this would eliminate divisions between Christians and provide the broadest basis upon which all believers could meet. Both Nee and Witness Lee emphasized the New Testament's references to churches by the name of the city (for example, in Acts, the Christians in Jerusalem being referred to as "the church which was at Jerusalem" (NKJV), as well as other verses with the same convention, including 1 Corinthians 1:2; Revelation 2:1, 8, 12, 18; 3:1, 7 and 14). Since Nee and Lee taught that there should only be one church in each city, and that that city was the extent of a church's jurisdiction, members of the local churches usually refer to their congregations as "the church in (city name)." According to Nee, this means that "the church in her locality must be inclusive, not exclusive," that is, it "must include all the children of God in the whole spectrum of Christian faith and practice."

Though Nee took the lead among the local churches in China, it was through one of his co-workers—Witness Lee—that the local churches spread worldwide. The two men first met in Lee's hometown of Yantai in 1932. Two years later, Lee moved to Shanghai to work with Nee. One of Lee's responsibilities there was the editing of some of Nee's publications. In the following years, Nee published many works and held regular conferences and trainings for church workers. Nee, Lee and other workers established over seven hundred local churches throughout China before the Communist Revolution resulted in the establishment of the People's Republic of China in 1949. Near the end of the Communist Revolution, Nee sent Witness Lee to Taiwan to ensure that their work would survive the political turmoil.

=== Developments after 1949 ===
The Denunciation Movement that began in 1951 after China entered the Korean War aimed at severing Christian groups in China from foreign influence, including expelling all foreign missionaries. As a side effect of the disbanding of mission churches, the local churches experienced "a spectacular rise in membership." The Denunciation Movement turned to leading Chinese Christians who would not join the Three-Self Reform Movement. Nee, who managed his family's pharmaceutical company, was imprisoned in 1952 during the Five-Anti Campaign and died in a labor camp 20 years later. Meanwhile, the work in Taiwan led by Witness Lee had grown to more than 20,000 members in 65 churches. Witness Lee visited the United States in 1958 and moved there in 1962, settling first in Los Angeles. In 2018, there were 250 local churches in the United States with approximately 30,000 members, and local churches can be found on all six inhabited continents.

In the early 1980s, the Chinese government designated Lee’s group of local churches with the name ‘Shouters’ and banned the group in 1983; the local churches which did not follow Lee were not banned. Lee also used the name of ‘the Assembly’ for his group.

Lee’s work in the USA was not welcomed by all local Christian groups and was seen in some quarters (including the Christian Research Institute and Spiritual Counterfeits Project) as being unorthodox or cult-like, leading to several court cases.

== Church meetings ==
The local churches practice mutuality in their meetings based on verses such as 1 Corinthians 14:26 ("Whenever you come together, each one has a psalm, has a teaching, has a revelation, has a tongue, has an interpretation. Let all things be done for building up."). Participants are encouraged to request hymns, make brief comments, or offer prayers or praises at will. This is particularly evident in "prophesying meetings" in which members speak one after another usually based on their recent learnings and experiences from their Christian walk and/or what they have studied throughout the previous week from the Bible, usually with the help of the commentary books by Watchman Nee and Witness Lee, including the periodical Holy Word for Morning Revival published by Living Stream Ministry.

== Beliefs ==
The local churches believe that:

1. The Bible is the Word of God, written under His inspiration word by word (2 Tim. 3:16), and is the complete and only written divine revelation of God to man (Deut. 4:2; 12:32; Prov. 30:5-6; Rev. 22:18-19).
2. There is one God (Deut. 6:4; 1 Cor. 8:4b; Isa. 45:5a), who is triune—the Father, the Son, and the Spirit (Matt. 28:19)—coexisting (Matt. 3:16-17; 2 Cor. 13:14) and coinhering (John 14:10-11) in three persons, or hypostases, distinct but never separate, from eternity to eternity.
3. Christ, the only begotten Son of God (John 1:18; 3:16), even God Himself (John 1:1), became a genuine man through incarnation (John 1:14), having both the divine and human natures (Rom. 9:5; 1 Tim. 2:5), the two natures being combined in one person and being preserved distinctly without confusion or change and without forming a third nature.
4. Christ died for our sins and was raised bodily from the dead (1 Cor. 15:3-4; Acts 4:10; Rom. 8:34), has been exalted to the right hand of God as Lord of all (Acts 5:31; 10:36), and will return as the Bridegroom for His bride, the church (John 3:29; Rev. 19:7), and as the King of kings to rule over the nations (Rev. 11:15; 19:16).
5. Salvation is by grace alone, through faith alone, in Christ alone (Eph. 2:5, 8) and in His completed work, resulting in our justification before God (Rom. 3:24, 28; Gal. 2:16) and in our being born of God to be His children (John 1:12-13).
6. The church as the unique Body of Christ, the issue of the work of Christ (Eph. 1:22-23), is composed of all genuine believers in Christ (Rom. 12:5; 1 Cor. 12:12) and, according to the New Testament revelation, is manifested in time and space in local churches, each of which includes all the believers in a given city, regardless of where they meet or how they may otherwise identify themselves (1 Cor. 1:2; 1 Thes. 1:1; Rev. 1:11).
7. All the believers in Christ will participate in the divine blessings in the New Jerusalem in the new heaven and new earth for eternity (Rev. 21:1—22:5).

== Evaluation ==
In the first decade of the 2000s, the local churches were the subject of two extensive evaluations. These evaluations were performed against the backdrop of decades of controversy (see Local Church controversies). The first was conducted by a faculty panel at Fuller Theological Seminary. After a two-year study, the Fuller panel stated, "It is the conclusion of Fuller Theological Seminary that the teachings and practices of the local churches and its members represent the genuine, historical, biblical Christian faith in every essential aspect." After a six-year study, the Christian Research Institute published a 2009 special issue of their journal in December 2009 with the words "We Were Wrong" on the cover. In it Hank Hanegraaff, Elliot Miller, and Gretchen Passantino published their findings, which resulted in a complete reversal of earlier criticisms.

== See also ==
- Local Church controversies
- Living Stream Ministry
- Bibles for America
- Recovery Version of the Bible
- The Lord's Recovery
