= Lindsay Gulin =

- Pitcher
- Born: November 22, 1976 (age 49); Southampton, New York, U.S.
- Bats: Left Throws: Left
- Stats at Baseball Reference

Teams
- Fukuoka Daiei Hawks/Fukuoka SoftBank Hawks (2004–2005); Sinon Bulls (2010)

Lindsay Tyson Gulin (born November 22, 1976) is an American former professional baseball pitcher. He has pitched in Nippon Professional Baseball and the Chinese Professional Baseball League.

== Minor league career ==
Gulin was first drafted by the New York Mets on June 11, 1995 in the 16th round of the 1995 amateur draft. He began his career in the 1995 season with their Rookie League GCL Mets and Class A (Short Season) Pittsfield Mets. In 1996, he played for their Class A Capital City Bombers. He returned to the Bombers in 1997 before being promoted to the Class A-Advanced St. Lucie Mets. He started the 1998 season in St. Lucie before being traded to the Seattle Mariners organization. He also played at Seattle's Class A Wisconsin Timber Rattlers and Class A-Advanced Lancaster JetHawks.

The following season, Gulin started with the independent Northern League's St. Paul Saints. After sixteen games, he was signed to a minor league contract with the Chicago Cubs. He played for the Class A-Advanced Daytona Cubs in 1999, where he also started in 2000 before being promoted to the Double-A West Tenn Diamond Jaxx.

As a free agent in 2001, he signed with the Los Angeles Dodgers organization. He began the season with the Double-A Jacksonville Suns. He began 2002 in Jacksonville, but was promoted to the Triple-A Las Vegas 51s during the season. After spending the entire 2003 campaign with Las Vegas, he returned to the independent circuit in 2004, this time with the Lincoln Saltdogs of the Northern League. He also pitched in 17 games for the Fukuoka Daiei Hawks in Japan that season.

After returning to the Saltdogs (now playing in the American Association) in 2006, Gulin returned to affiliated baseball in 2007, signing with the Milwaukee Brewers organization. He started the season with the Triple-A Nashville Sounds, but was sent to the Double-A Huntsville Stars early in the season. In 2008, he began the season with Nashville. After a strong first half performance in Nashville, he was named to the PCL Triple-A All-Star team and pitched one scoreless inning in the All-Star game, with two strikeouts. He filed for free agency after the 2009 season.

In 2010, he signed with the Sinon Bulls of the Chinese Professional Baseball League in Taiwan. He was released after only pitching in 6 games (OW:1L, ERA 5.869) in May. In 2011, he returned to the Saltdogs once again, but was released in June after starting the year with a 1-7 record.

Lindsay Gulin worked as a badminton coach for the Bellevue Badminton Club from 2013-2019. As of 2021, he works at Northwest Badminton Academy.
