= Banana Framework Agreement =

International agreement between EU and four Latin American countries

The Banana Framework Agreement (BFA) outlines regulations on the treatment, sharing, and production of bananas and other various banana related activities. It was concluded in 1993 between the European Union and Costa Rica, Colombia, Nicaragua and Venezuela, following a dispute in the framework of the General Agreement on Tariffs and Trade (GATT) on the EU's banana import regime (this dispute sometimes referred to as "the Banana Wars").

== Development ==
Five Latin American countries (Colombia, Costa Rica, Guatemala, Nicaragua and Venezuela) had forwarded a complaint against the EU's banana import regime in 1993, stating that it violated fundamental GATT principles. The panel established in the GATT framework confirmed this view, but its report was not adopted, as the required unanimity was prevented by the EU and countries belonging to the group of ACP states, who were receiving preferential treatment under the EU's importation regime. In the following year negotiations were held, after which four of the five complaining parties concluded the BFA with the EU, which granted them specific shares of the bound tariff quota they were subject to when exporting bananas to the EU.

On 9 June 2010, the EU and Brazil, Colombia, Costa Rica, Ecuador, Guatemala, Honduras, Mexico, Nicaragua, Panama, Peru and Venezuela entered into the Geneva Agreement on Trade in Bananas, which agreed a scale of diminishing tariffs on EU fresh banana imports applicable from 2009 until 1 January 2017 and extinguished all continuing disputes between the EU and these nations, referred to as the "Latin American MFN ('most favoured nation') banana suppliers".
