= Guling =

Guling may refer to:

- Guling (derogatory), a derogatory term for East Asians

== Geography ==
Guling may refer to these places in China:

- Guling, Chongqing (故陵), town in Yunyang County, Chongqing
- Guling, Guangxi (古零), town in Mashan County, Guangxi
- Guling, Jiangxi (牯岭), town in Jiujiang, Jiangxi Province, on the Mount Lu
- Guling, Fujian (鼓岭), resort in Jin'an District, Fuzhou, Fujian Province

== See also ==
- Gulin (disambiguation)
