= Witness Lee =

Chinese Christian preacher

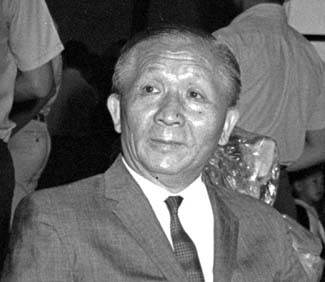
- Photograph of Witness Lee, circa 1960
- Born: 1905; Yantai, Shandong, China
- Died: June 9, 1997 (aged 91–92); Anaheim, California, United States

Chinese name
- Chinese: 李常受
Transcriptions
Standard Mandarin
- Hanyu Pinyin: Lǐ Chángshòu
Hakka
- Pha̍k-fa-sṳ: Lí Sòng-su
Southern Min
- Hokkien POJ: Lí Siông-siū
Eastern Min
- Fuzhou BUC: Lī Siòng-sêu

Witness Lee (Chinese: 李常受; pinyin: Lǐ Chángshòu; September 5, 1905 – June 9, 1997) was a Chinese Christian preacher, writer and hymnist who led the Christian group known as the local churches (or Local Church) in Taiwan and the United States. He was also the founder of Living Stream Ministry. Lee was born in 1905 in the city of Yantai, Shandong, China, to a Southern Baptist family. He became a Christian in 1925 after hearing the preaching of an evangelist named Peace Wang. He later joined the Christian work started by Watchman Nee. Like Nee, Lee emphasized what he considered the believers' subjective experience and enjoyment of Christ as life for the building up of the church, not as an organization, but as the Body of Christ.

== Biography ==
=== Early years ===
Witness Lee was born in 1905 in Shandong Province in China. Lee's great-grandfather was a Southern Baptist who brought Lee's mother into Christianity. Lee's mother studied in an American Southern Baptist mission school and was baptized as a teenager at a Southern Baptist church. She sold her inheritance to provide her children with an education in Chinese and English. Lee's father was a farmer who died in 1923.

Lee was brought into contact with his mother's Baptist Church in Yantai where he studied at a Southern Baptist elementary school and later at a mission college operated by American Presbyterians. Although Lee attended Southern Baptist services and Sunday school in his youth, he was never converted nor baptized by them. After her conversion, Lee's second sister began to pray for him and introduced him to a Chinese pastor who encouraged him to attend his Sunday morning services. Inspired by the preaching of Peace Wang, Lee dedicated himself to serve God for the rest of his life in April 1925 at the age of 19.

Through Watchman Nee's teaching Lee began to believe that denominationalism was unscriptural. In 1927, when elected to the board of the Chinese Independent Church, he declined the position and left the denomination. He met with missionaries Margaret E. Barber and Dora Yu. He then began to meet with the Benjamin Newton branch of the Plymouth Brethren where he remained for seven and a half years and was baptized in the sea by a local Brethren leader, Mr. Burnett, in 1930.

=== Ministry with Watchman Nee ===
Soon after Lee's conversion to Christianity, he began to study various Christian teachers and discovered the writings of Watchman Nee in two periodicals, The Morning Star and The Christian. Lee began to correspond with Nee to seek his guidance for a better understanding of the Bible. In 1932 Nee visited Yantai, and the two met for the first time. During the visit, Lee felt that his relationship with God and his understanding of how to study the Bible were revolutionized.

During this time, Lee began to feel that God was calling him to quit his job and serve as a full-time minister, which he did in August 1933. Soon afterward, he received a letter from Watchman Nee that read, “Brother Witness, as for your future, I feel that you should serve the Lord with your full time. How do you feel? May the Lord lead you.” Lee felt this letter strongly confirmed his decision. From that point onward, Lee began to work closely with Nee.

In 1934, Lee moved his family to Shanghai. He became the editor of Nee's magazine The Christian. The following year, he began to travel throughout China giving messages to Christians and helping to establish local churches; many churches were established in Zhejiang Province as well as in Beijing and Tianjin. He also traveled to the northwestern provinces of Suiyuan, Shanxi, and Shaanxi to preach the gospel and edify Christians there prior to the Japanese invasion in 1937.

With the war beginning, Lee returned to Yantai caring for churches in Yantai and Qingdao. At the end of 1942 a revival broke out in Yantai, and the church met continuously for one hundred days. Under suspicion of espionage due to his experimentation with evangelism by migration, Lee was arrested by the Imperial Japanese Army in May 1943 and underwent a month's interrogation through flogging and water torture. His health was greatly weakened by this imprisonment and he developed tuberculosis. In order to rest and recuperate, he moved to Qingdao in 1944 for two years. Following the end of the war, brought great uncertainty for Nee's ministry. In 1949, Nee and his co-workers sent Witness Lee to Taiwan in order to continue Nee's work free from the threat of government persecution under Chinese communism.

Watchman Nee and Witness Lee met for the last time in Hong Kong in 1950. For over a month they spoke together and helped bring about a revival in the church in Hong Kong. Nee charged Lee to instruct, teach, and lead the elders and to make arrangements concerning the church services, as well as the purchase of land for the building of a new meeting place. Nee then returned to mainland China where, in 1952, he was imprisoned for the remaining twenty years of his life by the CCP. The two were never able to communicate again.

=== Ministry in Taiwan ===
When Witness Lee moved to Taiwan in May 1949 he began his work with a few believers and churches already present there. Within five to six years, the number of Christians under his leadership increased from five hundred to over fifty thousand. Lee began to conduct conferences and trainings for the churches on a yearly basis and beginning in 1951 a formal training for his ministry co-workers. Lee also began to publish books through his publishing company, The Taiwan Gospel Book Room, as well as The Ministry of the Word magazine published from 1950 until 1986 in 415 issues.

In the early 1980s, the Chinese government designated Lee's group of local churches with the name ‘Shouters’ and banned the group in 1983; the local churches which did not follow Lee were not banned. Lee also used the name of ‘the Assembly’ for his group.

=== Going west ===
Lee's work in the West was initiated with invitations to conduct conferences in London, England and Copenhagen, Denmark in 1958. Between 1958 and 1961, he also visited the United States three times. In 1962 he moved to Los Angeles and held his first conference there. Messages from that conference were later published as a book entitled The All-Inclusive Christ. In the ensuing years, Lee was invited to speak to Christian groups throughout the United States. His messages delivered during shorter conferences and longer trainings were printed in The Stream magazine, published by The Stream Publishers (later renamed Living Stream Ministry).

Lee’s work in the USA was not welcomed by all local Christian groups and was seen in some quarters (including the Christian Research Institute and Spiritual Counterfeits Project) as being unorthodox or cult-like, leading to several court cases.

Throughout the 1960s and 1970s Lee traveled extensively throughout the United States, Canada, and the Far East, and elsewhere.

After Watchman Nee’s death in 1972, Lee became leader of the local church movement.

In 1974 he moved to Anaheim, California where he began a book-by-book exposition of the Bible with the Life-study of Genesis. His entire Life-study of the Bible was completed in December 1994. Lee also wrote extensive outlines, footnotes, and cross references for the entire New Testament; these were eventually incorporated into a new translation of the New Testament, the Recovery Version, published in English in 1985. A translation into Chinese appeared in 1987, with various other languages following it since Lee's death.

=== "God-Ordained Way" ===
Beginning in the mid-1980s, Witness Lee felt that the rate of growth was too slow in the local churches. Eventually, he returned to Taiwan and determined that there was a need for a shift away from large meetings with one speaker to small group meetings in homes. In his ministry he began to refer to this emphasis as the "God-ordained way." Lee believed that by practicing the God-ordained way, churches could be saved from oldness and degradation and be brought back to a biblical pattern. The God-ordained way consists of four major steps:

The first step of the God-ordained way is to fulfill the New Testament priesthood of the gospel to seek, visit, and contact sinners for God's salvation to make the sinners organic members of the Body of Christ and offer them to God as the New Testament sacrifice (Rom. 15:16; 1 Pet. 2:5, 9). The second step is to nourish and cherish the newborn babes in Christ in home meetings as nursing mothers (1 Thes. 2:7). The third step is to perfect the saints by mutual teaching in group meetings for the work of the ministry to build up the organic Body of Christ (Eph. 4:12-13). Finally, the fourth step of the God-ordained way is the prophesying by all the saints in the church meetings for the direct and organic building up of the Body of Christ as the organism of the processed Triune God (1 Cor. 14:1–5, 23–26, 31, 39a).

— Witness Lee, Fellowship Concerning the Urgent Need of the Vital Groups

=== Later ministry ===
In February 1994 Lee began to deliver messages on subjects he referred to as "the high peak of the divine revelation." The focus of his messages was "God’s economy to make the believers God in life and nature but not in the Godhead." He also spoke on topics like "the New Jerusalem, the complete salvation of God with its judicial and organic aspects, the full ministry of Christ in His three divine and mystical stages, and the incorporation of the believers with the consummated Triune God." He also began a series of Bible expositions known as "Crystallization-studies." He continued to encourage the practice of the "God-ordained way."

Witness Lee gave his last conference in February 1997. Three months later he was hospitalized with complications due to prostate cancer. He died on June 9, 1997.

== Witness Lee's view of Christendom ==
Witness Lee was critical of Christendom as a system while stressing the need to accept all believers based on what he taught was the common faith (Tit. 1:4, Jude 3).

This degraded religious system [of Christendom] takes the natural, human, traditional, cultural, and religious way. Humanly speaking, religion is a good thing, but spiritually speaking it is something against God's economy. God does not want a religion, but He surely wants to see His economy accomplished. We are not here for religion but for God's economy, which is to propagate His completed Christ to produce the church as the Body of such a Christ.

— Witness Lee, The God-ordained Way to Practice the New Testament Economy

The church includes all those who share the common faith that saves us, the one faith spoken of in Ephesians 4:5. This faith is held in common by all who are saved (2 Pet. 1:1). This faith causes the believers to be one and does not divide them. Any creed or system of teaching that goes beyond the common faith divides the believers.

— Witness Lee, Crucial Truths in the Holy Scriptures, Vol. 6

Witness Lee taught that certain practices in Christendom were unscriptural, such as the use of denominating names and the clergy-laity system. Nevertheless, he often emphasized the need for oneness among all Christians.

== Publications ==
Many of Witness Lee's spoken messages have been published in over 400 books translated into more than fourteen different languages.

He wrote the Experiencing, Enjoying and Expressing Christ series with Watchman Nee.

His largest written work is The Life-study of the Bible, comprising over 25,000 pages of commentary on every book of the Bible from the perspective of the believers' enjoyment and experience of God's divine life in Christ through the Holy Spirit. A radio broadcast called Life-study of the Bible with Witness Lee was later produced from these spoken messages. Following the Life-study Lee began a focused Crystallization-study to look at high points, or "crystals," of each book of the Bible. However, he died before completing this work.

He was also the chief editor of a new translation of the New Testament into English and Chinese called the Recovery Version.

In addition, Witness Lee wrote, collected, and translated Christian hymns. In 1963 and 1964, he wrote the lyrics to approximately 200 new hymns that he compiled together with hymns from other authors. These were then categorized by topic for Hymns, with a total of 1,080 songs, published by Living Stream Ministry.

== Bibliography ==
The Economy of God

== See also ==
- Watchman Nee
- The Local Churches
- Local Church controversies
- Living Stream Ministry
- Recovery Version
