= Christian World Liberation Front =

UC Berkeley outreach group (1969–1975)

The Christian World Liberation Front (CWLF) was an evangelical Christian campus ministry at the University of California, Berkeley from April 1969 to June 1975. It sought to appeal to disillusioned young people by adopting the mode of dress, methods, and language of the counterculture of the 1960s. It was considered one of the most prominent Jesus People ministries, partly due to the influence of its underground newspaper Right On.

== Background ==
In 1967 Campus Crusade for Christ (CCC) president Bill Bright conceived of a strategy to reach students at UC Berkeley, considered the hotbed of campus radicalism as the launching point of the Free Speech Movement and the Vietnam Day Committee. CCC sent six hundred staff and students for a weeklong blitz. However, CCC staff members were generally dissatisfied with the result.

In February 1969, Jack Sparks, a former associate professor of statistics at Penn State and current CCC staff member, visited UC Berkeley with Pat Matrisciana and Fred Dyson. From their visit they concluded that they should move to Berkeley and adopt the counterculture's methods in order to reach the students, including distributing leaflets and using signs, posters, and bullhorns.

The three moved with their families and a few others to Berkeley to start their outreach in April. CCC funded the effort as a pilot program, but stayed in the background due to concerns over how its conservative donors would perceive the endeavor. Matrisciana and Dyson did not stay long, leaving Sparks as the group's unquestioned leader. The Third World Liberation Front had established a chapter at UC Berkeley in January 1969, so Sparks's group adopted the name Christian World Liberation Front.

== Characteristics and activities ==
In 1970 CWLF members infiltrated and disrupted the opening meeting of a regional conference of Students for a Democratic Society (SDS), staging a sit-in in front of the speakers' platform and demanding an opportunity to speak. CWLF frequently reserved locations often used for student protest rallies, sometimes infuriating the leftists, including an incident in which the CWLF refused to yield the steps of Sproul Hall to anti-war protestors, inciting the protestors to burn the university's ROTC building. The conflict developed into "the worst riots the school had seen up until that time."

Sparks and an associate, Paul Raudenbusch, wrote a street language version of the New Testament epistles called Letters to Street Christians that incorporated coarse language and illustrations in the style of underground comic books. Sparks's talks to CWLF gatherings were called "Bible raps." Sparks encouraged CWLF members to develop their own ministries. CWLF ministries included the underground newspaper Right On, a "radical" free university The Crucible, a street theater troupe, Rising Son Ranch and various crash pads for young people drying out from drug use, and the Spiritual Counterfeits Project. Nationwide distribution of Right On through an informal network of churches and schools was instrumental in establishing the CWLF's reputation in the Jesus People movement.

To distance itself from the dominant American culture in the minds of its target constituents, CWLF adopted an anti-establishment tone. Over time this came to include social critique and the group's language "increasingly mirrored that of the New Left." The stridency of these critiques led CCC to dissolve its covert funding of CWLF. Instead, CWLF began to receive financial support from Evangelical Concerns, a group consisting of mostly San Francisco Bay Area Baptist pastors, laymen, and officials formed in 1967 to fund Jesus People outreaches to the counterculture.

== Dissolution ==
Beginning from 1973 Sparks began to reach out to former colleagues from CCC who had left after the Berkeley blitz. These men began to look upon themselves as men imbued with apostolic authority to implement and bring the church back to its historic roots. They eventually became the core of the New Covenant Apostolic Order (NCAO). In 1975 Sparks asserted his authority with the CWLF and tried to convert it into a church along the lines of the NCAO's teaching. Opposition to this plan resulted in the dissolution of the CWLF in June 1975 and the establishment of the Berkeley Christian Coalition to take its place. Most CWLF staff members did not follow Sparks, but about half of the group's members did.

== See also ==
- Evangelical Orthodox Church
