= Living Stream Ministry =

American nonprofit

- Founded: 1965
- Founder: Witness Lee
- Type: Nonprofit organization
- Location: P.O. Box 2121 Anaheim, CA 92814-0121 US
- Products: Published Works of Watchman Nee and Witness Lee
- Website: www.lsm.org

Living Stream Ministry (LSM), originally named Stream Publishers when founded in 1965 by Witness Lee, is a nonprofit corporation currently based in Anaheim, California. LSM publishes the works of Watchman Nee and Witness Lee, including the Recovery Version of the Bible. LSM has been a member of the Evangelical Christian Publishers Association since 2002 and of the Christian Booksellers Association since 1981.

== Statement of Faith ==
LSM holds to the following statement of faith:

Holding the Bible as the complete and only divine revelation, we strongly believe that God is eternally one and also eternally the Father, the Son, and the Spirit, the three being distinct but not separate. We hold that Christ is both the complete God and the perfect man. Without abandoning His divinity, He was conceived in the womb of a human virgin, lived a genuine human life on earth, and died a vicarious and all-inclusive death on the cross. After three days He resurrected bodily and has ascended to the heavens. He is now in glory, fully God but still fully man. We look to His imminent return with the kingdom of God, by which He will reign over the earth in the millennium and in eternity. We confess that the third of the Trinity, the Spirit, is equally God. All that the Father has and is, is expressed by the Son; and all that the Son has and is, is realized as the Spirit. We further believe that mankind is in need of God's salvation. Though we were absolutely unable to fulfill the heavy demands of God's righteousness, holiness, and glory, Christ fulfilled all the requirements through His death on the cross. Because of Christ's death, God has forgiven us of our sins, justified us by making Christ our righteousness and reconciled us to Himself. Based on Christ's redemption, God regenerates the redeemed with His Spirit to consummate His salvation, that they may become His children. Now possessing God's life and nature, the believers enjoy a daily salvation in His Body in this age and the eternal salvation in the coming age and in eternity. In eternity we will dwell with God as the New Jerusalem, the consummation of God's salvation of His elect.

== Activities ==
Living Stream Ministry publishes the works of Watchman Nee and Witness Lee, providing the authoritative and definitive collections. The writings of Watchman Nee and Witness Lee focus on the enjoyment of the divine life and on the building up of the Body of Christ. Its purpose is to promote the teachings of Watchman Nee and Witness Lee, and to prepare, select, and distribute information of all kinds which may be useful for the growth of spiritual life among Christians.

Living Stream Ministry publishes and prepares video tapes, audio tapes, and printed spiritual materials intended for all Christians worldwide. LSM also supports radio programs such as The Life-Study of the Bible, a thirty-minute radio program composed of excerpts from the works of Witness Lee. This program, which began production in 1996, is currently broadcast in three languages to more than 100 radio stations. LSM also conducts and hosts various conferences and trainings throughout the year, including the Full Time Training in Anaheim (FTTA). It also operates the Anaheim Palms Telecom Center and donates funds to local churches and affiliated organizations.

== One publication ==
In 2005, Living Stream Ministry published a booklet on behalf of the co-workers among the local churches called Publication Work in the Lord's Recovery. The booklet stated that only publications carried out under the collective oversight of the co-workers should be used in the local churches. Seeking to restrict the churches from using any other material in a widespread way, it discouraged all members from carrying out private publication works. The booklet also stated that this was not a mandate and that "the one publication should not become the basis of our accepting or rejecting any persons in the communion of faith or in the fellowship of the churches; it should not be insisted on as an item of the faith. If any are not inclined to be restricted in one publication, these ones are still our brothers; they are still in the genuine local churches." The booklet also states, "There is nearly no item of life or light that has not been covered by our publications" and describes the benefit of other publications in this way: "...the fact that these publications can be produced and distributed should not give them any more credence among the churches than anything else that can be published today, secular or religious. These are simply other publications that our brothers and sisters may or may not be interested in. They are not part of the one publication in the Lord's recovery, and they are not necessarily beneficial to the spiritual good of the saints among us."

== See also ==
- Watchman Nee
- Witness Lee
- The Local Churches
- Recovery Version
