= Theodore Austin-Sparks =

British Christian evangelist (1888–1971)

Theodore Austin-Sparks (1888–1971), often known as "Mr. Sparks" or "TAS", was a British Christian evangelist and author.

== Early life ==
After his birth in London in 1888, Theodore was sent at a young age to live in Scotland with his father's relatives. There, at the age of 17, he determined to become a Christian as he listened to a group of young street-preachers in Glasgow. Within a short time, he was also giving his public testimony alongside this group.

== Career ==
Mr Austin-Sparks was ordained as a Baptist minister at the age of 24. From 1912 to 1926, he led three congregations in Greater London. During 1923–26, he spoke at conferences with Jessie Penn-Lewis and was associated with her publication and speaking ministry, The Overcomer Testimony. In 1926, Austin-Sparks broke with this organization.

Following a spiritual crisis in 1926, Mr Austin-Sparks resigned his Baptist ordination. Later that year the congregation at Honor Oak all agreed to leave the Baptist denomination (see Church Notes in the 1926 A Witness and A Testimony magazines). Together with like-minded Christians, he established a conference and training center at Honor Oak in southeast London. A great number of Christians participated in conferences and classes at the center while staying at available guest quarters, some living there for years at a time participating in Bible courses, practical services, and church meetings. There was a similar conference center maintained during the summers at Heathfield House in Kilcreggan, Scotland which was owned by Honor Oak Christian Fellowship. A Trust was set up for the house in 1931. In 1960 Kilcreggan was gifted to the interdenominational faith mission, WEC International.

From the Honor Oak Christian Fellowship Centre Mr Austin-Sparks and his co-workers ran a publishing operation that printed a bi-monthly magazine, A Witness and a Testimony. This magazine was printed from 1923 until Austin-Sparks' death in 1971. Theodore Austin-Sparks also published books he had written or were edited from transcripts of his recorded messages. He was a prolific author/speaker and published most of his messages first in his free bimonthly magazines.

The first page of his magazine included the following statement:

The object of the ministry of this little paper, issued bi-monthly, is to contribute to the Divine end which is presented in the words of Ephesians 4:13 - "...till we all attain unto the unity of the faith, and of the knowledge (literally - full knowledge) of the Son of God, unto a full-grown man, unto the measure of the stature of the fulness of Christ: that we be no longer children..." It is not connected with any 'Movement,' 'Organization,' 'Mission' or separate body of Christians, but is just a ministry to "all saints." Its going forth is with the prayer and hope that it will so result in a fuller measure of Christ, a richer and higher level of spiritual life, that, while bringing the Church of God into a growing approximation to His revealed will as to its 'attainment,' the Church may be better qualified to be used of Him in testimony in the nations, and to the completing of its own number by the salvation of those yet to be added by the Lord.

Among the many books written by T. Austin-Sparks, the most well-known include The School of Christ,The Centrality and Supremacy of the Lord Jesus Christ] and We Beheld His Glory.

Mr Austin-Sparks' speaking ministry took him around Europe, North America and Asia holding conferences in the United Kingdom, the United States, Switzerland, Taiwan, the Philippines, and elsewhere. Many of his spoken messages were recorded, and a great number of audio messages and books remain available on https://www.austin-sparks.net. He was insistent that his writings and messages be reproduced word-for-word as originally spoken or written.

His work at the Honor Oak Christian Fellowship and Conference Centre was international in scope. Many who trained under his ministry became missionaries and Christian teachers, as shown in the notes of the A Witness and a Testimony magazines and in testimonies given. This enabled him to work closely with several well-known Christian leaders in the UK and other countries, including Bakht Singh of India, Watchman Nee of China, Roger Forster of Forest Hill, Stephen Kaung of Richmond, Virginia and Lance Lambert of Jerusalem, Israel.

== Publications ==
Mr Austin-Sparks self-published many of his books from the fellowship center in Honor Oak, London. The name of their publication ministry was Witness and Testimony Publishers. Theodore Austin-Sparks and the Witness and Testimony Publishers also published messages by other authors, many of whom were associated with Honor Oak or whom TAS knew personally. In particular, the first version of Watchman Nee's "The Normal Christian Life" was published chapter by chapter in the A Witness and A Testimony magazine. The Publishers later also published the series as a book.

Some of Theodore Austin-Sparks books were also published by:

Testimony Book Ministry USA (1948-1998)

Three Brothers Books USA (1980-)

Emmanuel Church USA (1980-)

Seedsowers USA (1997-)

Austin-Sparks.Net (2001-)

== Legacy ==
Theodore Austin-Sparks died April 13, 1971. Mr Austin-Sparks deliberately made no provision for the continuing of his magazine or ministry following his death. A colleague of his, Harry Foster, wrote: "Mr. Austin-Sparks had left word that there should be no automatic continuation of the magazine ministry". Mr Austin-Sparks believed that what was from God and of God would be taken care of by Him, he wrote: "God only takes responsibility to supply and to carry on that which is essentially heavenly, and in the measure in which a thing is heavenly, and only in that measure (but surely in that measure), God takes responsibility for it". He and his wife Florence, had 4 daughters and 1 son. Florence Austin-Sparks died in 1986.
