= Watchman Nee =

Chinese Christian teacher and leader

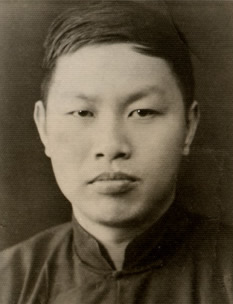
- Watchman Nee
- Born: November 4, 1903; Shantou, Qing dynasty
- Died: May 30, 1972 (aged 68); Guangde, Anhui, China
- Movement: Local church movement, Tripartite "crush soul-life and release spirit"

Watchman Nee, Ni Tuosheng, or Nee T'o-sheng (Chinese: 倪柝聲; pinyin: Ní Tuòshēng; November 4, 1903 – May 30, 1972), was a 20th century "Chinese evangelist, theologian, and founder of the Local Church movement." He was influenced in part by the Plymouth Brethren, the Higher Life Movement, and Wesleyan-holiness tradition.

In 1922, he initiated church meetings in Fuzhou, Fujian province, that may be considered the beginning of the local churches. During his 30 years of ministry, Nee published many books, including expositions of Scripture as well as works on the Christian life and spiritual experience. He established churches throughout China and held frequent conferences to train Bible students and church workers. Following the Communist Revolution, Nee was persecuted and imprisoned for his faith and spent the last 20 years of his life in prison. He was honored by Christopher H. Smith (R–NJ) in the US Congress on July 30, 2009. He is commemorated in the Presbyterian Church (USA) church calendar on May 30.

He was recognized by Christianity Today as one of the 100 most influential Christians of the century due to his prolific writings and role in founding the Local Church movement. He is considered by some scholars to be "the leading Chinese theologian of the twentieth century.” Despite spending the last two decades of his life in prison where he eventually died, his work continued to spread globally through translations. His most famous work is The Normal Christian Life.

== Family and childhood ==
Watchman Nee was born on November 4, 1903, the third of nine children of Ni Weng-hsiu, a well-respected officer in the Imperial Customs Service, and Lin He-Ping (Peace Lin), who excelled as a child at an American-staffed Methodist mission school. His grandfather was a gifted Anglican preacher. During a stint at the Chinese Western Girls' School in Shanghai to improve her English, Lin He-Ping met Dora Yu, a young woman who gave up a potential career in medicine to serve as an evangelist and preacher.

Since Nee's parents were both Methodists, he was baptized by a bishop of the Methodist Church as an infant.

== Early schooling ==
In 1916, at age 13, Nee entered the Church Missionary Society Vernacular Middle School in Fuzhou, Fujian province to begin his Western-style education. He then went on to the middle school at Trinity College in Fuzhou, where he demonstrated great intelligence and ambition. Among his classmates was Wilson Wang, brother of one of Watchman Nee's good friends, Leland Wang. The two boys completed college despite severe flooding which brought cholera and plague and hardship to their region. In the final examinations, the 2 boys scored almost the same marks with Wilson Wang topping the class, followed closely by Watchman Nee in second place.

== Conversion and training ==
In the spring of 1920, when Nee was 17, Dora Yu was invited to hold ten days of revival meetings in the Church of Heavenly Peace in Fuzhou. After Nee's mother attended these meetings, she was moved to apologize to her son for a previous incident of unjust punishment. Her action impressed Nee so much that he determined to attend the next day's evangelistic meetings to see what was taking place there. After returning from the meeting, according to Nee's own account:

On the evening of 28th April, 1920, I was alone in my room, struggling to decide whether or not to believe in the Lord. At first I was reluctant but as I tried to pray I saw the magnitude of my sins and the reality and efficacy of Jesus as the Savior. As I visualized the Lord's hands stretched out on the cross, they seemed to be welcoming me, and the Lord was saying, "I am waiting here to receive you." Realizing the effectiveness of Christ's blood in cleansing my sins and being overwhelmed by such love, I accepted him there. Previously I had laughed at people who had accepted Jesus, but that evening the experience became real for me and I wept and confessed my sins, seeking the Lord's forgiveness. As I made my first prayer I knew joy and peace such as I had never known before. Light seemed to flood the room and I said to the Lord, "Oh, Lord, you have indeed been gracious to me."

— Watchman Nee, Watchman Nee's Testimony.

As a student at Trinity College, Nee began to speak to his classmates concerning his salvation experience. Later, he recounted:

Immediately I started putting right the matters that were hindering my effectiveness, and also made a list of seventy friends to pray for daily. Some days I would pray for them every hour, even in class. When the opportunity came I would try to persuade them to believe in the Lord Jesus... With the Lord's grace I continued to pray daily, and after several months all but one of the seventy persons were saved.

— Watchman Nee, Watchman Nee's Testimony.

After his conversion, Nee desired to be trained as a Christian worker. He first attended Dora Yu's Bible Institute in Shanghai, though he was still a high school student. However, he was dismissed due to his bad and lazy habits, such as sleeping in late. Eventually, Nee's seeking to improve his character brought him into close contact with a British missionary Margaret E. Barber who became his teacher and mentor. Nee would visit Barber on a weekly basis in order to receive spiritual help. Barber treated Nee as a young learner and frequently administered strict discipline. When she died in 1930, Barber left all of her belongings to Nee, who wrote:

We feel most sorrowful concerning the news of the passing away of Miss Barber in Lo-Hsing Pagoda, Fukien. She was one who was very deep in the Lord, and in my opinion, the kind of fellowship she had with the Lord and the kind of faithfulness she expressed to the Lord are rarely found on this earth.

— Witness Lee, Watchman Nee: A Seer of the Divine Revelation in the Present Age.

== The Plymouth Brethren connection ==
Through Barber, Watchman Nee was introduced to the writings of D. M. Panton, Robert Govett, G. H. Pember, Jessie Penn-Lewis, T. Austin-Sparks, and others. In addition, he acquired books from Plymouth Brethren teachers like John Nelson Darby, William Kelly, and C. H. Mackintosh. Eventually, his personal library encompassed over three thousand titles on church history, spiritual growth, and Bible commentary, and he became intimately familiar with the Bible through diligent study using many different methods. In the early days of his ministry, he is said to have spent one-third of his income on personal needs, one-third to assist others, and the remaining third on spiritual books. He was known for his ability to select, comprehend, discern, and memorize relevant material, and grasp and retain the main points of a book while reading.

Nee derived many of his ideas, including plural eldership, disavowal of a clergy-laity distinction, and worship centered around the Lord's Supper, from the Plymouth Brethren. From 1930 to 1935, his movement interacted internationally with the Raven-Taylor group of Exclusive Brethren led by James Taylor Sr. This group "recognized" the Local Church movement as a parallel work of God, albeit one that had developed independently. Nee refused, however, to follow their practice of isolating themselves from other Christians and rejected their ban on celebrating The Lord's Supper with other Christians. Matters came to a head when Exclusive Brethren leaders learned that during his 1933 visits to the United Kingdom and the United States Nee had broken bread with Honor Oak Christian Fellowship associated with the independent ministry of T. Austin-Sparks and with non-Brethren missionaries whom Nee had known in China. After a series of communications Nee received a letter dated August 31, 1935, signed by leading Brethren, severing fellowship with him and his movement.

== Marriage ==
As a teenager, Nee fell in love with Charity Chang. Their two families had been friends for three generations. When Nee became a Christian, Charity ridiculed Jesus in Nee's presence. This bothered him. Eventually, after much struggling, Nee felt he needed to give up on their relationship. Ten years later, after finishing her university education, Charity became a Christian. She began attending church meetings in Shanghai in 1934. In the same year, during Nee's fourth "Overcomer Conference" in Hangzhou, the two were married. Charity cared for Nee in his frequent illness and was the only visitor Nee was permitted during his imprisonment. They had no children.

== Ministry ==
In 1936, before a group of fellow workers, Watchman Nee outlined the commission of his ministry:

From the time I was bedridden by illness until the time I was healed by God, I was being shown more clearly the kind of work God wanted me to do. This consists of the following four aspects:

1. Literary Work: After my illness, God made it known to me that the primary purpose of His imparting messages to me was not for explaining the Scripture, nor for preaching the ordinary Gospel, nor for prophesying, but for laying stress on the living word of life... All that I have written has one aim, which is that the reader will, in the new creation, give himself wholly to God and become a useful person in His hands. Now I whole-heartedly commit my writings, my readers and myself to God, who preserves men for ever, and hope that His Spirit will guide me into all His truths.
2. Meetings for the Overcomer: God opened my eyes to the necessity of raising up in churches at various places, a number of people who are victorious to be His witnesses... Therefore once every year a meeting for the victorious was held in which I faithfully proclaimed the messages which God has revealed to me.
3. Building up Local Churches: When the Lord called me to serve Him, the prime object was not for me to hold revival meetings so that people may hear more Scriptural doctrines nor for me to become a great evangelist. The Lord revealed to me that He wanted to build up local churches in other localities to manifest Himself, to bear testimony of unity on the ground of local churches so that each saint may perform his duty in the Church and live the Church life. God wants not merely individual pursuit of victory or spirituality but a corporate, glorious Church presented to Himself.
4. Youth Training: If the return of the Lord be delayed, it will be necessary to raise up a number of youths to continue the testimony and work for the next generation... My idea is not to establish a seminary or a Bible institute but to have the young people live a corporate life and practice spiritual life, that is, receive training for the purpose of edification and to learn to read the Scripture and to pray in order to build up good character. On the negative side, to learn how to deal with sin, the world, the flesh, natural life, and so on. At a suitable time they are to return to their respective churches to be tempered together with other saints to serve the Lord in the Church...

In the future my personal burden and work will generally comprise these four aspects. May all the glory be to the Lord.

— Watchman Nee, Watchman Nee's Testimony.

Nee began to write and publish at a very early age. In 1923, he began to publish the magazine The Present Testimony, and in 1925, he started another magazine entitled The Christian. It was also in 1925 when Nee changed his name from Ni Shu-tsu to Ni To-sheng (English translation: Watchman Nee). At age 21, Nee established the first "local church" in Sitiawan, Malaysia, while visiting his mother, who had moved there from China. In 1926, Nee established another local church in Shanghai, which became the center of his work in China. By 1932, Nee's practice of meeting as local churches spread throughout China, Indonesia, Malaysia, and Singapore. He maintained this pattern until his imprisonment.

In 1928, Nee published a three-volume book entitled The Spiritual Man. In February of the same year, Nee held his first "Overcomer Conference" in Shanghai. In January 1934, Nee called a special conference on the subjects of "Christ as the Centrality and Universality of God" and "The Overcomers". According to Nee, this was a turning point for him in his ministry. He said, "My Christian life took a big turn from doctrines and knowledge to a living person, Christ, who is God's centrality and universality."

In February 1934, Nee gave a series of talks in which he defined and expounded the practice of the local churches, stating that in the Bible, the church is never divided into regions and never denominated based on a teaching or doctrine. These talks were eventually published in the book The Assembly Life. He publicly condemned denominationalism as sinful, arguing that denominational churches were not true churches. He urged believers to leave them and join his local church system. This provoked strong opposition from the denominations, as many congregations transferred to his movement.

In Pingyang, Zhejiang, congregations formerly affiliated with the China Inland Mission, the Methodist Episcopal Church, and independent churches abandoned their denominational identities. By 1949, more than 100 churches had joined the Local Church, with tens of thousands of believers.

In May of 1934, Nee encouraged Witness Lee to move to Shanghai from Yantai in order to join him and Ruth Lee in their work editing Nee's publications.

In 1938, Nee traveled to Europe and gave messages that were later published as The Normal Christian Life. Upon his return, Nee gave a conference on the Body of Christ. According to Nee, this was the second turn in his ministry. Nee recounted, "My first turn was to know Christ, and my second turn was to know His Body. To know Christ is only half of what the believers need. The believers also must know the Body of Christ. Christ is the head, and He is also the Body."

In 1939, Nee became involved with his second brother's failing pharmaceutical company. Although acquiescing to family pressure, Nee also saw this as an opportunity to support his many co-workers who were suffering great poverty and hardship during the Second World War. Nee took over full management of the factory, reorganized it, and began to employ many local church members from Shanghai. At this time, some of the elders from the church in Shanghai questioned Nee's involvement in business, causing Nee to suspend his ministry in 1942. Shortly afterward, the church in Shanghai stopped meeting altogether.

On March 6, 1945, Nee moved to Chongqing to oversee the factory there. There, he delivered a series of messages on Revelation 2 and 3 published as The Orthodoxy of the Church as well as messages on the Song of Songs. On September 9, 1945, the Japanese army surrendered in China, ending the Second Sino-Japanese War. In 1946, Peace Wang and Witness Lee began to work to restore the church in Shanghai as well as Nee's public ministry there. Nee purchased twelve bungalows at Guling, Fujian to hold trainings for his co-workers in the Christian work. By April 1948, a revival was brought to the church in Shanghai, and Nee resumed his ministry there. After he returned, Nee was said to have handed his pharmaceutical factory over to the Christian work as an offering to God. He also strongly urged many others to hand over their possessions to the work. Within a short time, the church in Shanghai grew to over 1000 members.

== Persecution and imprisonment ==
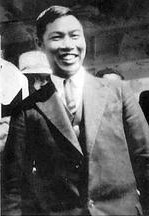
Watchman Nee (date unknown)

The rise of the Chinese Communist Party (CCP) in 1949, with its doctrine of state atheism, caused Christians to come under great persecution. False charges and arrests were also brought against many foreign missionaries. Through intensive propaganda campaigns and threats of imprisonment, believers were influenced to accuse one another.

As part of its effort to control the churches, the CCP initiated the Three-Self Patriotic Movement and required churches to join and operate within its system. Some independent church leaders, such as Wang Ming-Dao, refused to do so and were sentenced to life imprisonment. Nee, however, instructed believers in the Local Church to support the movement and join its church system. Nee also instructed the Local Churches to participate in the Denunciation Movement required by the CCP, aimed at purging what the CCP characterized as imperialist influence introduced by Western missionaries. Nee’s concessions to the authorities, however, did not ultimately lead to better outcomes for either the churches or himself.

Nee’s attempts to navigate the new political environment also became evident in the controversy surrounding the Guling Training Center, a key facility for training co-workers. The center was threatened with confiscation under the 1950 Agrarian Reform Law. In response, Nee mobilized the Local Churches to collect 32,782 signatures petitioning the Communist government to protect the property. Realizing that the petition could be interpreted as organized resistance, he instead gave the signatures to Y. T. Wu, the leader of the Three-Self Patriotic Movement, presenting them as support for the Three-Self Movement, all without informing those who had signed the petition.

Despite these efforts to accommodate the CCP, Nee was arrested on April 10, 1952 by Public Security officers from Manzhouli, Manchuria and charged with bribery, theft of state property, tax evasion, cheating on government contracts, and stealing of government economic information. By then, he had been the chief decision-maker of the pharmaceutical factory and had controlled many of its assets. Nee was also "re-educated". On January 11, 1956, there was a nationwide sweep targeting the co-workers and elders in the local churches. Some died in labor camps, while others faced long prison sentences. On January 18, 1956, the Religious Affairs Bureau began twelve days of accusation meetings at the church assembly hall on Nanyang Road in Shanghai, in which many accusations were brought against Nee in large accusation meetings. On June 21, 1956, Nee appeared before the High Court in Shanghai, where it was announced that he had been excommunicated by the elders in the church in Shanghai and found guilty on all charges. He was sentenced to fifteen years imprisonment with reform by labor. Initially, he was detained at Tilanqiao Prison in Shanghai but was later moved to other locations. Only his wife, Charity, was allowed to visit him.

On January 29, 1956, Public Security took over the Nanyang Road building, and many of Nee's co-workers were arrested, put into isolation, and forced to repudiate Watchman Nee. Some co-workers joined in the accusation of Watchman Nee while others, such as Peace Wang, Ruth Lee, and Yu Chenghua remained silent and were punished with life imprisonment. Following this, mass accusation meetings were held across the country to condemn the "anti-revolutionary sect of Watchman Nee".

== Later imprisonment and death ==
One year before Nee's death in 1972, his wife, Charity, died due to an accident and high blood pressure; Nee was not allowed to attend her funeral. Charity's eldest sister then took the responsibility to care for Nee in prison. Nee was scheduled for release in 1967 but was detained in prison until his death on May 30, 1972. There was no announcement of his death nor any funeral. His remains were cremated on June 1, 1972, before his family arrived at the prison.

Nee's grandniece recounted the time when she went to pick up Nee's ashes:

In June 1972, we got a notice from the labor farm that my granduncle had passed away. My eldest grandaunt and I rushed to the labor farm. But when we got there, we learned that he had already been cremated. We could only see his ashes... Before his departure, he left a piece of paper under his pillow, which had several lines of big words written in a shaking hand. He wanted to testify to the truth which he had even until his death, with his lifelong experience. That truth is—"Christ is the Son of God who died for the redemption of sinners and resurrected after three days. This is the greatest truth in the universe. I die because of my belief in Christ. Watchman Nee." When the officer of the labor farm showed us this paper, I prayed that the Lord would let me quickly remember it by heart... My granduncle had passed away. He was faithful until death. With a crown stained with blood, he went to be with the Lord. Although Nee did not fulfill his last wish, to come out alive to join his wife, the Lord prepared something even better—they were reunited before the Lord.

— Watchman Nee's grandniece, Watchman Nee: A Seer of the Divine Revelation in the Present Age.

== Beliefs ==
Nee believed in the verbal inspiration of the Bible and that the Bible is God's Word. He also believed that God is in one sense triune, Father, Son, and Spirit, distinctly three, yet fully one, co-existing and co-inhering each other from eternity to eternity. He believed that Jesus Christ is the Son of God, even God himself, incarnated as a man with both the human life and the divine life, that he died on the cross to accomplish redemption, that he rose bodily from the dead on the third day, that he ascended into heaven and was enthroned, crowned with glory, and made the Lord of all, and that he would return the second time to receive his followers, to save Israel, and to establish his millennial kingdom on the earth. He believed that every person who believes in Jesus Christ will be forgiven by God, washed by his redeeming blood, justified by faith, regenerated by the Holy Spirit, and saved by grace. Such a believer is a child of God and a member of the Body of Christ. He also believed that the destiny of every believer is to be an integral part of the church, which is the Body of Christ and the house of God.

Watchman Nee divided Christians into three categories: the spiritual man, the soulish man, and the carnal man. In The Spiritual Man, he developed a tripartite view of human nature, consisting of the spirit, soul, and body. According to Nee, the spirit includes the conscience, intuition, and communion; the soul includes the mind, emotions, and will; and the body constitutes the physical aspect of human existence. Nee taught that the spirit is superior to the soul and that Christians should distinguish the spirit from the soul and live according to the spirit rather than the soul, which can be summarized as releasing the spirit through the crushing of the soul life. These ideas are developed particularly in The Spiritual Man and The Breaking of the Outer Man and the Release of the Spirit.

Nee regarded intellectual activities such as theological study as primarily belonging to the soul and argued that they could not, by themselves, apprehend spiritual reality. He therefore emphasized that Holy Scripture should be understood not only through the mind and its literal meaning, but also through the human spirit, which he believed could apprehend the spirit behind the written words.

Watchman Nee advocated restoring church life to the pattern of the apostolic era, which meant that there should be only one church in each city. He argued that, according to the New Testament, the city is the proper boundary of a local church and that all believers in a city should therefore belong to the same church. He regarded the existence of multiple churches in one city as wrong and sinful because, in his view, it divided the Body of Christ. Accordingly, Nee held that only a church organized according to his teaching qualified as the one legitimate church in any given city, although that church could have multiple meeting places within the city. He rejected other congregations’ claims to be churches there and urged Christians in those groups to leave them and join the local church instead.

Nee argued that the practice of pastors receiving a salary was not consistent with the biblical pattern.

Nee believed that apostles still exist today. As the foremost apostle raised up by God in China in the 20th century, Nee taught that the elders of a local church must absolutely submit to the apostles because the apostles appoint them. He also taught that believers must absolutely submit to these elders as authorities in the church. In Authority and Submission, he argued that even when the person exercising authority makes a mistake, those under his authority should still submit.

Nee said:

Someone may ask, "What if the person with delegated authority does something wrong?" If God dares to entrust someone with authority, then we dare to submit to that authority. Whether the person in authority is right or wrong is not my concern. In other words, the one with delegated authority is directly responsible to God for whether he acts rightly or wrongly. Those who are under his authority need only to obey absolutely. If they obey wrongly, the Lord will not count it as their sin; rather, that sin will be called to account from the one with the delegated authority.

Nee’s teaching had serious consequences. Pastor Shao Zun-Lan once wrote:

Later on, particularly in Taiwan, the teaching about authority was pushed to an extreme… One brother said, ‘Brother So-and-so is my authority. If he says black is white, then black is white.’ Someone responded, ‘We serve one Lord, but you are serving two lords.’ He replied, ‘No! When I serve Brother So-and-so, I am serving the Lord.’ Thus, it became like Catholicism within the local churches, and So-and-so was treated like the pope!

Nee had a unique blend of Brethren theology, the exchanged life theology of the Keswick conventions and his own insights into Christian theology. His book, Sit, Walk, Stand focused on the believer's position "in Christ," an important feature of the Apostle Paul's theology.

== Controversy Over the Allegations ==
Since Nee was publicly accused by the government in 1956 of sexual misconduct, debate over whether he committed the alleged offense has continued.

=== Response of Supporters ===
Supporters argue that the allegations were politically motivated and defamatory. They point to Zhang Xikang's testimony that the signature on Nee's confession was not in his handwriting, Nee's wife's refusal to acknowledge misconduct or divorce him, and the numerous wrongful accusations and persecutions during Chairman Mao's rule between 1950 and 1978.

=== Views of Critics ===
Leung Ka-Lun, Lily M. Hsu, and others argue that Nee had serious problems in his relationships with women. Lily M. Hsu, a former church member, reported that in 1956 she and Zhang Xikang visited Miao X-chun, one of two alleged victims, the other being Zhang X-nian, both of whom were female coworkers of Nee. Miao acknowledged that an incident had occurred. The church subsequently revoked the ministerial positions of the two coworkers for concealing the matter.

== Publications ==
In addition to speaking frequently before many audiences, Watchman Nee authored various books, articles, newsletters, and hymns. Most of his books were based on notes taken down by students during his spoken messages. Some books were compiled from messages published previously in his periodicals.

Watchman Nee's best-known book in English is The Normal Christian Life, is based on talks he delivered in English during a trip to England and Europe in 1938 and 1939. There he expressed theological views on the New Testament book of Romans. The English messages of The Normal Christian Life were first published chapter by chapter in the magazine A Witness and A Testimony beginning in the November–December issue in 1940. It was later published as a book by Witness and Testimony Publishers in August 1945 and advertised in the September–October edition of the A Witness and A Testimony magazine.

Some of Watchman Nee's best-known books include:

- The Spiritual Man (屬靈人) (1928), translated in 1969
- Concerning Our Missions (1939), translated in 1942
- The Song of Songs (1945), translated in 1970
- The Breaking of the Outer Man and the Release of the Spirit (1950), translated in 1961
- The Normal Christian Life (正常的基督徒生活) (1938–1939), published in 1940 (messages given in English)
- The Normal Christian Church Life (1938), translated in 1965
- Sit, Walk, Stand (坐行站) (1957), translated in 1971
- What Shall this Man Do? (1961), translated in 1975
- Love Not the World (1951), translated in 1968
- Let Us Pray (1942), translated in 1949
- A Living Sacrifice (1932), translated in 1950
- Authority & Submission (1941), translated in 1950
- The Spirit of the Gospel (1949), translated in 1971
- God's Work (1940), translated in 1967
- Back to the Cross (1931), translated in 1956
- Grace for Grace (1949), translated in 1968
- How to Study the Bible (1956), translated in 1968
- Practical Issues of this life (1938), translated in 1970
- The Mystery of Creation, translated in 1981

In addition to publishing his own books, other spiritual publications were translated from English and published under Watchman Nee's oversight. These included books by T. Austin-Sparks, Madame Guyon, Mary E. McDonough, Jessie Penn-Lewis, and others.

== See also ==
- The Lord's Recovery
- Witness Lee
- The Local Churches
- The Normal Christian Life
- Margaret E. Barber
- Dora Yu
