= Anthropology of Christianity =

Anthropology of Christianity may refer to:

Two fields within anthropology

- Anthropology of religion
- Comparative religion

A field within theology

- Christian anthropology
