= Christian symbolism =

Christian symbolism is the use of symbols, including archetypes, acts, artwork or events, by Christianity. It invests objects or actions with an inner meaning expressing Christian ideas.

The symbolism of the early Church was characterized by being understood by initiates only, while after the legalization of Christianity in the Roman Empire during the 4th century more recognizable symbols entered in use. Christianity has borrowed from the common stock of significant symbols known to most periods and to all regions of the world.

Only a minority of Christian denominations have practiced aniconism, or the avoidance or prohibition of types of images. These include early Jewish Christian sects, as well as some modern denominations such as Baptists that prefer to some extent not to use figures in their symbols due to the Decalogue's prohibition of idolatry.

== Early Christian symbols ==
=== Cross and crucifix ===
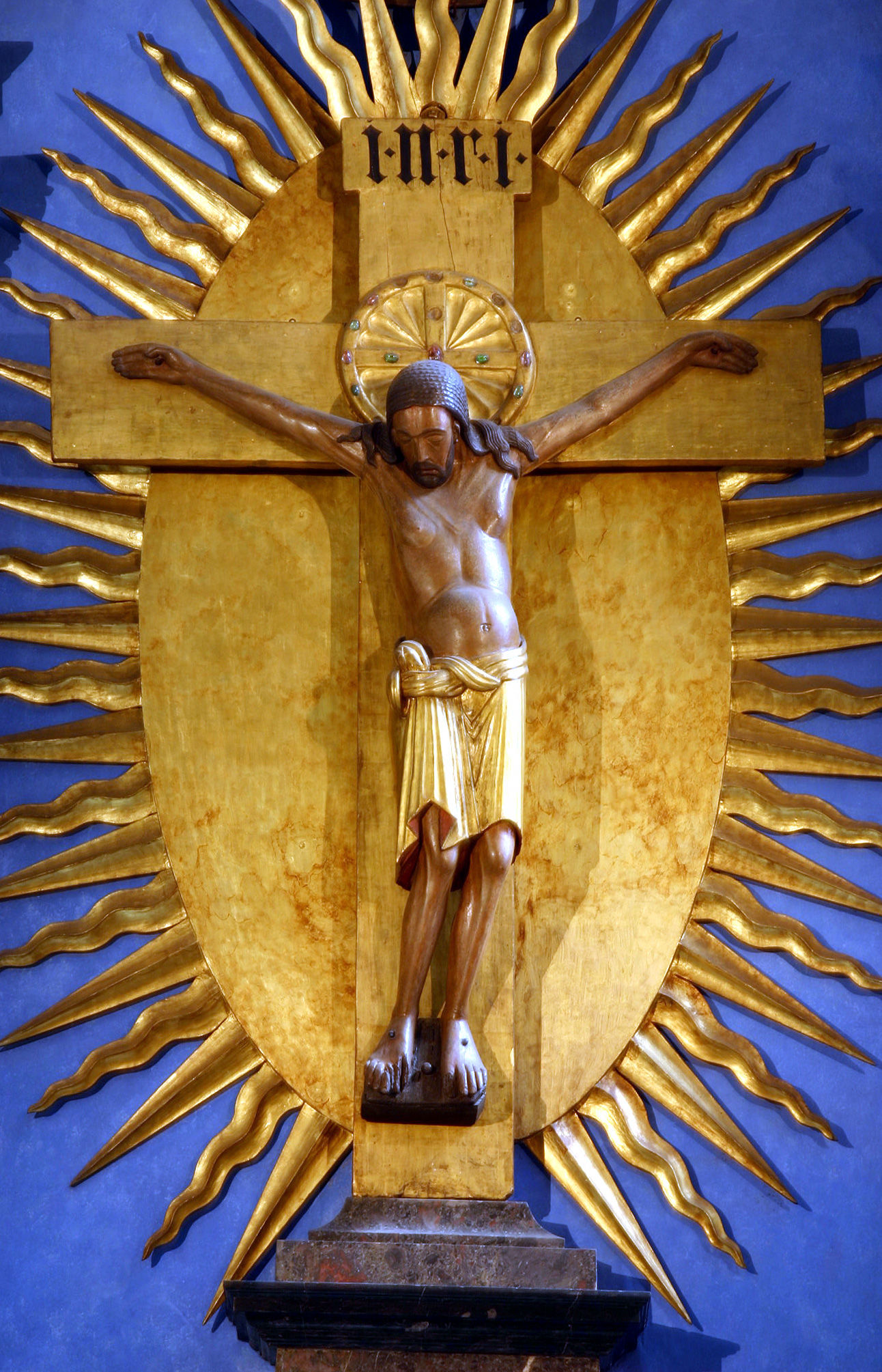
The Crucifix, a cross with corpus, a symbol used in the Catholic Church, Lutheranism, the Eastern Orthodox Church, and Anglicanism, in contrast with some other Protestant denominations, Church of the East, and Armenian Apostolic Church, which use only a bare cross

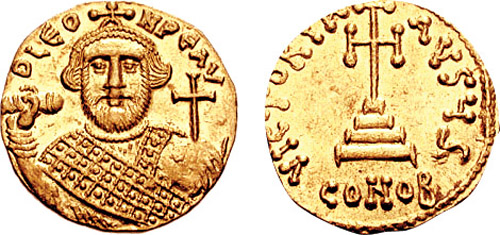
Early use of a globus cruciger on a solidus minted by Leontios (r. 695–698); on the obverse, a stepped cross in the shape of an Iota Eta monogram

The shape of the cross, as represented by the letter T, came to be used as a "seal" or symbol of Early Christianity by the 2nd century. At the end of the 2nd century, it is mentioned in the Octavius of Minucius Felix, rejecting the claim by detractors that Christians worship the cross. The cross (crucifix, Greek stauros) in this period was represented by the letter T. Clement of Alexandria in the early 3rd century calls it τὸ κυριακὸν σημεῖον ("the Lord's sign") and he repeats the idea, current as early as the Epistle of Barnabas, that the number 318 (in Greek numerals, ΤΙΗ) in Genesis 14:14 was a foreshadowing (a "type") of the cross (T, an upright with crossbar, standing for 300) and of Jesus (ΙΗ, the first two letters of his name ΙΗΣΟΥΣ, standing for 18).

Clement's contemporary Tertullian also rejects the accusation that Christians are crucis religiosi (i.e. "adorers of the gibbet"), and returns the accusation by likening the worship of pagan idols to the worship of poles or stakes. In his book De Corona, written in 204, Tertullian tells how it was already a tradition for Christians to trace repeatedly on their foreheads the sign of the cross.

While early Christians used the T-shape to represent the cross in writing and gesture, the use of the Greek cross and Latin cross, i.e. crosses with intersecting beams, appears in Christian art towards the end of Late Antiquity. An early example of the cruciform halo, used to identify Christ in paintings, is found in the Miracles of the Loaves and Fishes mosaic of Sant'Apollinare Nuovo, Ravenna (dated c. 504).

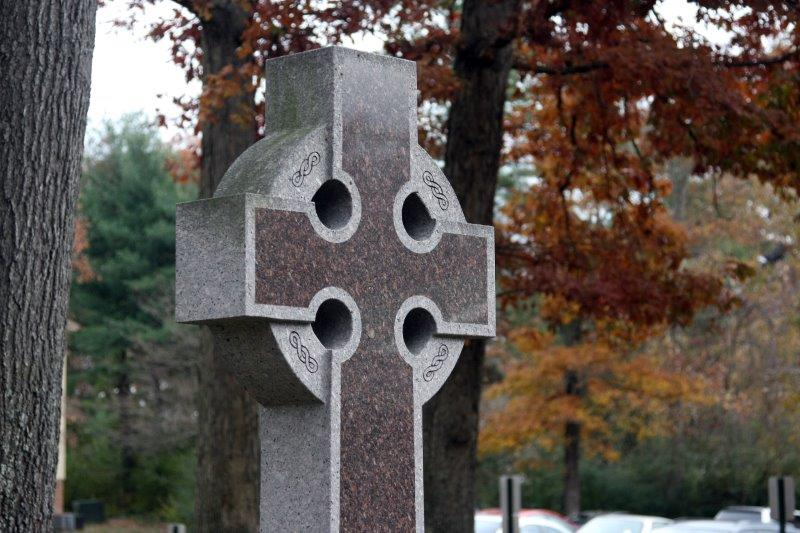
20th–21st century Celtic cross with inscribed symbolism

Instances of the St Thomas cross, a Greek cross with clover leaf edges, popular in southern India, date to about the 6th century.

The Patriarchal cross, a Latin cross with an additional horizontal bar, first appears in the 10th century.

The Celtic cross is a form of ringed cross, usually consisting of a Christian cross with a circular nimbus around the intersection of the arms and stem. It is especially associated with medieval Insular Christian art and high crosses in Ireland and Britain. Although the origin of the ringed form has been debated, the Celtic cross as a documented Christian symbol is generally associated with early medieval Ireland and Britain rather than with a clearly established pre-Christian origin.

Although the cross was used as a symbol by early Christians, the crucifix, i.e. depictions of the crucifixion scene, were rare prior to the 5th century; some engraved gems thought to be 2nd or 3rd century have survived, but the subject does not appear in the art of the Catacombs of Rome. The purported discovery of the True Cross by Constantine's mother, Helena, and the development of Golgotha as a site for pilgrimage led to a change of attitude. It was probably in Palestine that the image developed, and many of the earliest depictions are on the Monza ampullae, small metal flasks for holy oil, that were pilgrim's souvenirs from the Holy Land, as well as 5th century ivory reliefs from Italy.

In the early medieval period, the plain cross became depicted as the crux gemmata, covered with jewels, as many real early medieval processional crosses in goldsmith work were. The first depictions of crucifixion displaying suffering are believed to have arisen in Byzantine art, where the S-shaped slumped body type was developed. Early Western examples include the Gero Cross and the reverse of the Cross of Lothair, both from the end of the 10th century.

Marie-Madeleine Davy (1977) described in great detail Romanesque Symbolism as it developed in the Middle Ages in Western Europe.

=== Ichthys ===
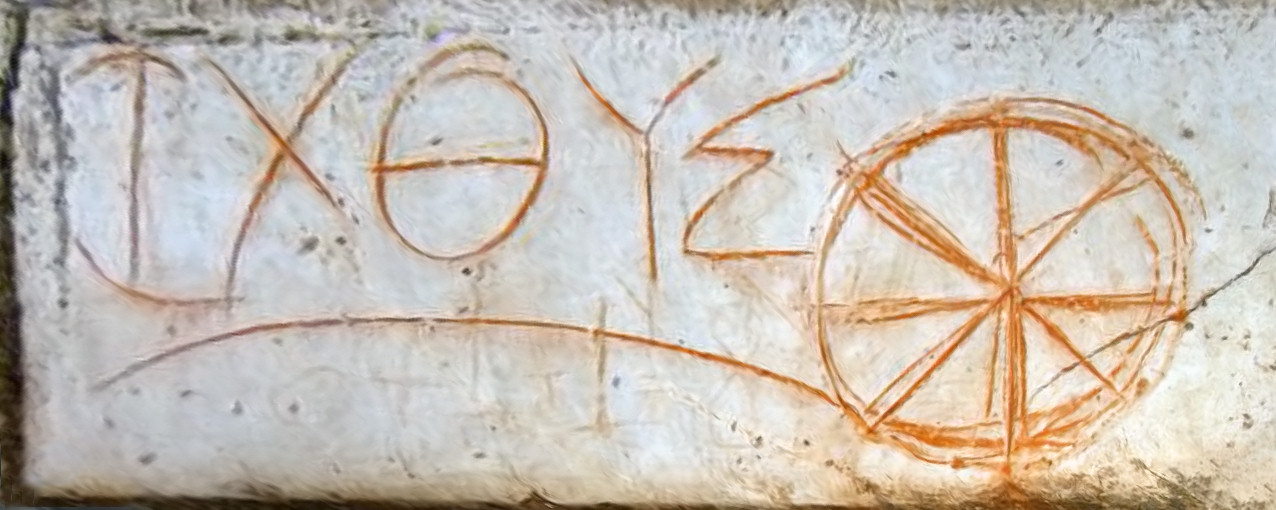
A written Ichthys from ancient Ephesus

Among the symbols employed by the early Christians, that of the fish seems to have ranked first in importance. Its popularity among Christians was due principally to the famous acrostic consisting of the initial letters of five Greek words forming the word for fish (Ichthus or Ιχθυς), which words briefly but clearly described the character of Christ and the claim to worship of believers: "Ἰησοῦς Χριστὸς Θεοῦ Υἱὸς Σωτήρ" (Iēsous Christos Theou Huios Sōtēr), meaning Jesus Christ, God's Son, Saviour. This explanation is given among others by Augustine in his Civitate Dei.

=== Alpha and Omega ===
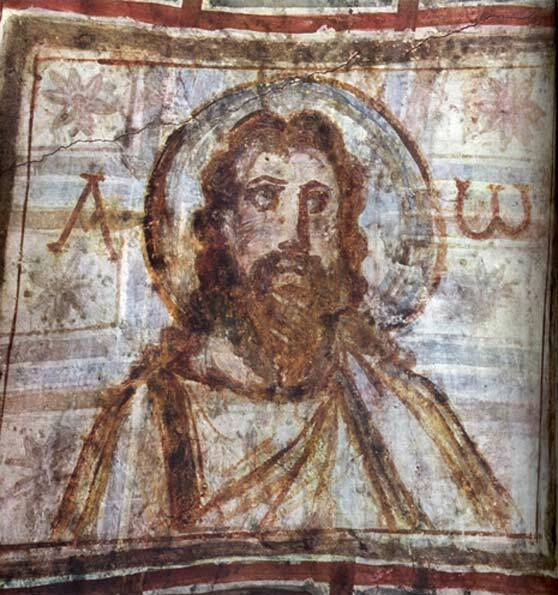
Jesus depicted with the alpha and omega letters in the catacombs of Rome from the 4th century

The use since the earliest Christianity of the first and the last letters of the Greek alphabet, alpha (α or Α) and omega (ω or Ω), derives from the statement said by Jesus (or God) himself "I am Alpha and Omega, the First and the Last, the Beginning and the End" (Revelation 22:13, also 1:8 and 21:6).

=== Staurogram ===
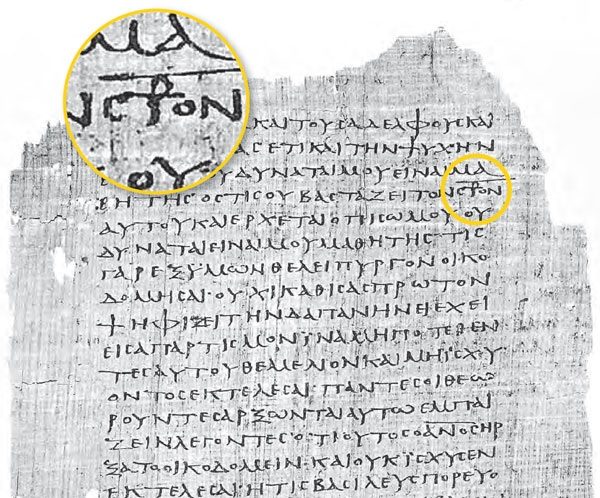
A staurogram used as τρ-ligature part of the spelling of the word σταυρον (as ϲ̅(τ̅ρ̅)ο̅ν̅) in Luke 14:27 (Papyrus Bodmer XIV-XV, 2nd century)

The Staurogram ⳨ (from the Greek σταυρός, i.e. cross), also Monogrammatic Cross or Tau-Rho symbol, is composed by a tau (Τ) superimposed on a rho (Ρ). The Staurogram was first used to abbreviate the Greek word for cross in very early New Testament manuscripts such as P66, P45 and P75, almost like a nomen sacrum, and may visually have represented Jesus on the cross.

Ephrem the Syrian in the 4th century explained these two united letters stating that the tau refers to the cross, and the rho refers to the Greek word "help" (Βoήθια [sic]; proper spelling: Βoήθεια) which has the numerological value in Greek of 100 as the letter rho has. In such a way the symbol expresses the idea that the Cross saves. The two letters tau and rho can also be found separately as symbols on early Christian ossuaries.

The Monogrammatic Cross was later seen also as a variation of the Chi Rho symbol, and it spread over Western Europe in the 5th and 6th centuries.

=== Chi Rho ===
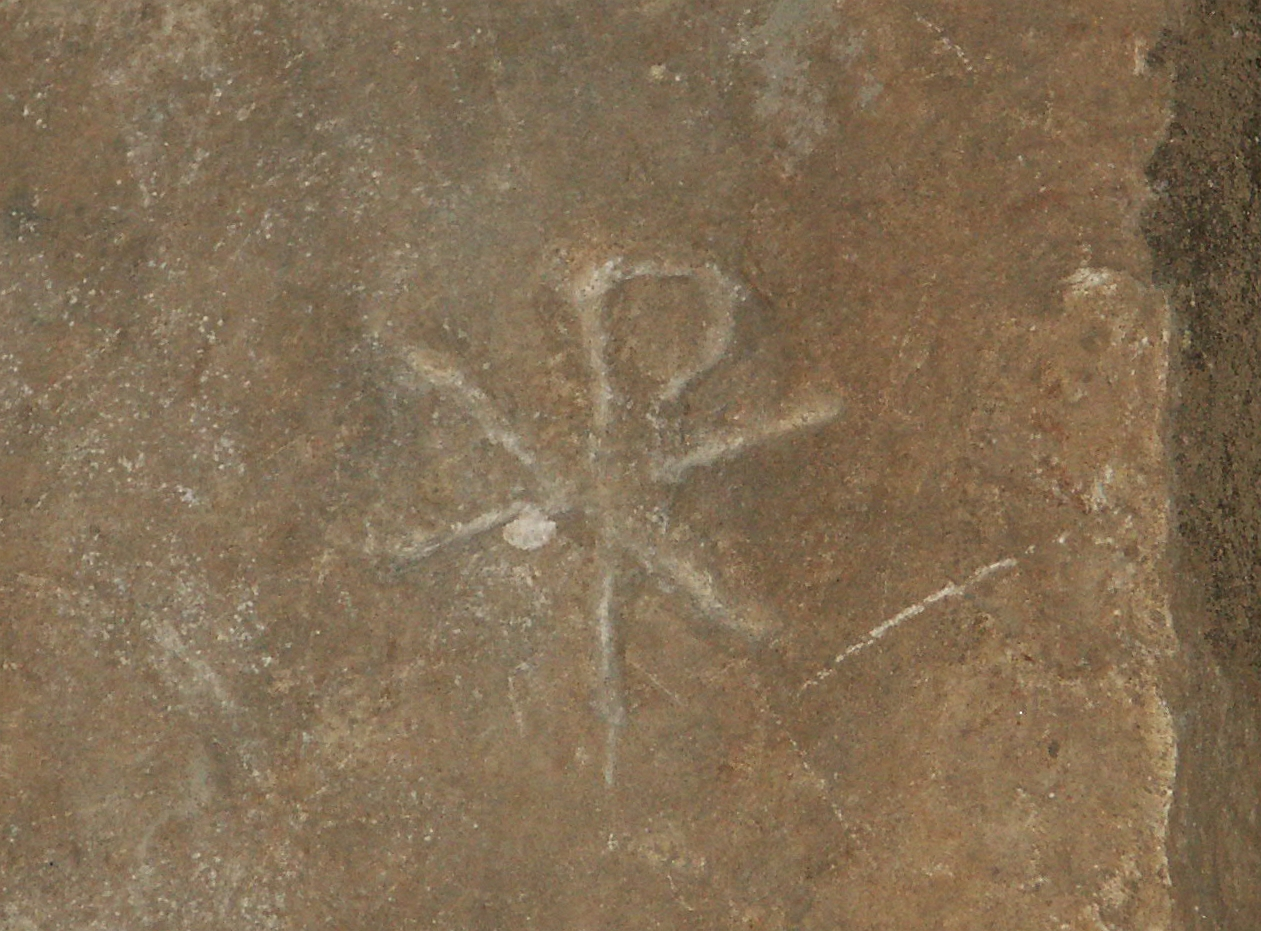
The Chi-Rho symbol ☧, Catacombs of San Callisto, Rome

The Chi Rho is formed by superimposing the first two (capital) letters chi and rho (ΧΡ) of the Greek word "ΧΡΙΣΤΟΣ", meaning Christ, in such a way to produce the monogram. Widespread in ancient Christianity, it was the symbol used by the Roman emperor Constantine I as vexillum (named Labarum).

=== IH monogram ===
The first two letters of the name of Jesus in Greek, iota (Ι) and eta (Η), sometime superimposed one on the other, or the numeric value 18 of ΙΗ in Greek, was a well known and very early way to represent Christ. This symbol was already explained in the Epistle of Barnabas and by Clement of Alexandria. For other christograms such as IHS, see Article Christogram.

=== IX monogram ===
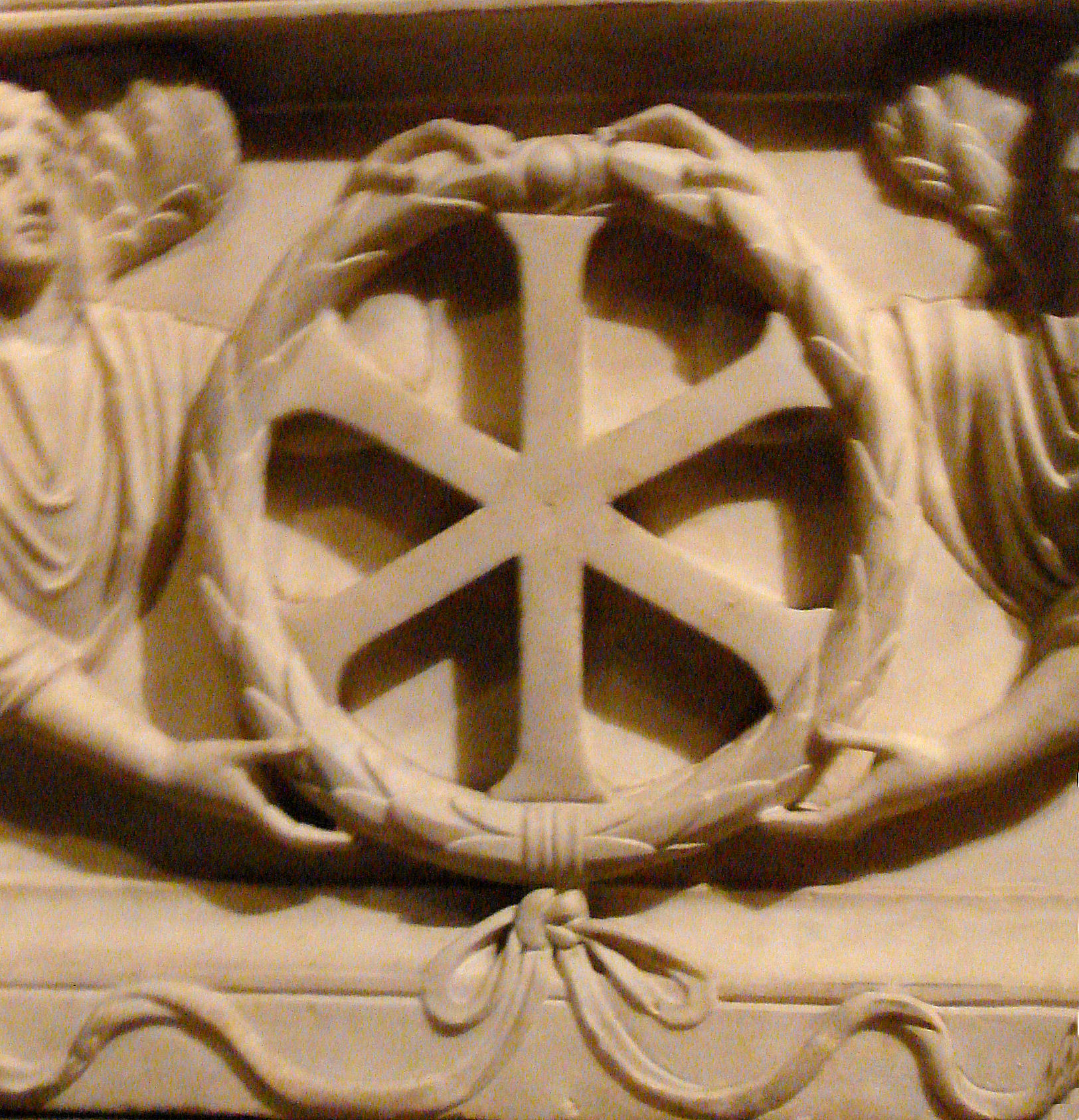
A IX monogram from a 4th century sarcophagus from Constantinople

An early form of the monogram of Christ, found in early Christian ossuaries in Palaestina, was formed by superimposing the first (capital) letters of the Greek words for Jesus and Christ, i.e. iota Ι and chi Χ, so that this monogram means "Jesus Christ". Another more complicated explanation of this monogram was given by Irenaeus and Pachomius: because the numeric value of iota is 10 and the chi is the initial of the word "Christ" (Greek: ΧΡΕΙΣΤΟΣ [sic]; proper spelling: ΧΡΙΣΤΟΣ) which has 8 letters, these early fathers calculate 888 [(10 × 8) × 10] + [(10 × 8) + 8], which was a number already known to represent Jesus, being the sum of the value of the letters of the name Jesus (ΙΗΣΟΥΣ) (10 + 8 + 200 + 70 + 400 + 200).

== Other Christian symbols ==
=== The Good Shepherd ===
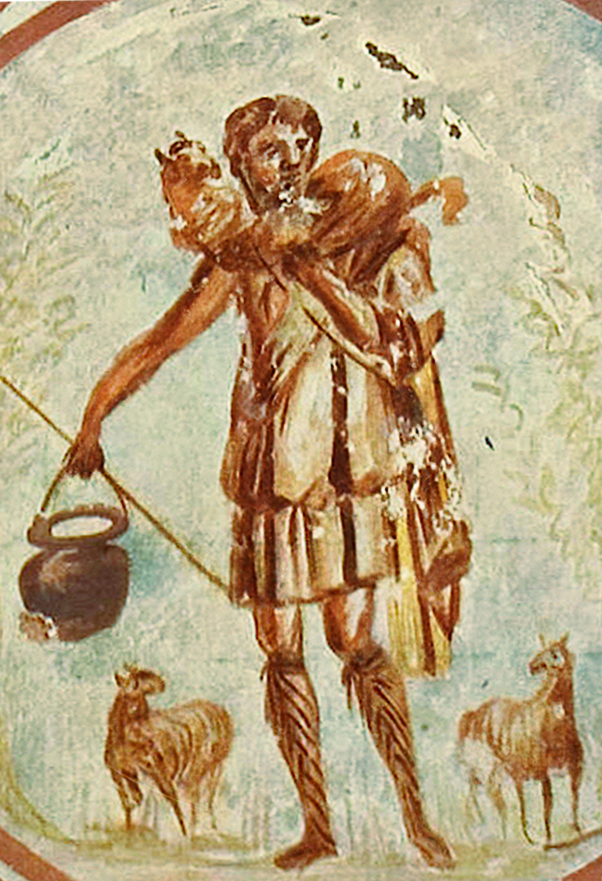
A 3rd-century painting of the Good Shepherd in the Catacomb of Callixtus

The image of the Good Shepherd, often with a sheep on his shoulders, is the most common of the symbolic representations of Christ found in the Catacombs of Rome, and it is related to the Parable of the Lost Sheep. Initially it was also understood as a symbol like others used in Early Christian art. By about the 5th century the figure more often took on the appearance of the conventional depiction of Christ, as that convention had developed by this time, and was given a halo and rich robes.

=== Dove ===
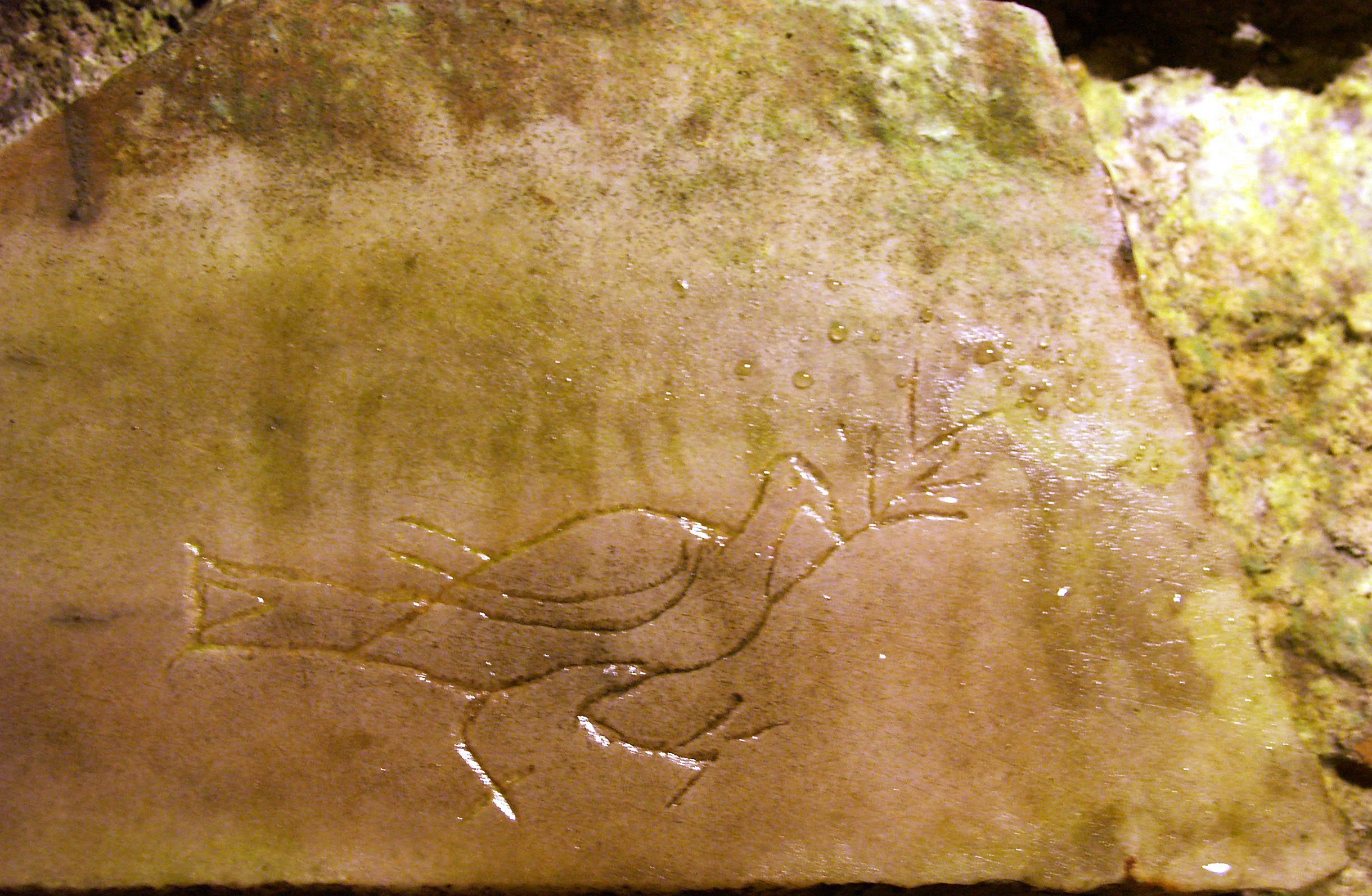
A dove with an olive branch, Catacombs of Domitilla, Rome

The dove as a Christian symbol is of very frequent occurrence in ancient ecclesiastical art. According to Matthew 3:16, during the Baptism of Jesus the Holy Spirit descended like a dove and came to rest on Jesus. For this reason the dove became a symbol of the Holy Spirit, and in general it occurs frequently in connection with early representations of baptism. It signifies also the Christian soul, not the human soul as such, but as indwelt by the Holy Spirit; especially, therefore, as freed from the toils of the flesh and entered into rest and glory. The Peristerium or Eucharistic dove was often used in the past, and sometimes still appears in Eastern Christianity, as church tabernacle.

However the more ancient explanation of the dove as a Christian symbol refers to it as a symbol of Christ himself: Irenaeus in the 2nd century explains that the number 801 is both the numerological value of the sum in Greek of the letters of the word "dove" (Greek: περιστερά) and the sum of the values of the letters Alpha and Omega, which refer to Christ. In the Bible story of Noah and the Flood, after the flood a dove returns to Noah bringing an olive branch as a sign that the water had receded, and this scene recalled to the Church Fathers Christ who brings salvation through the cross. This biblical scene led to interpreting the dove also as a symbol of peace.

The "wings of a dove", with associations of wealth and good fortune, contrast with misfortune and shame.

=== Peacock ===
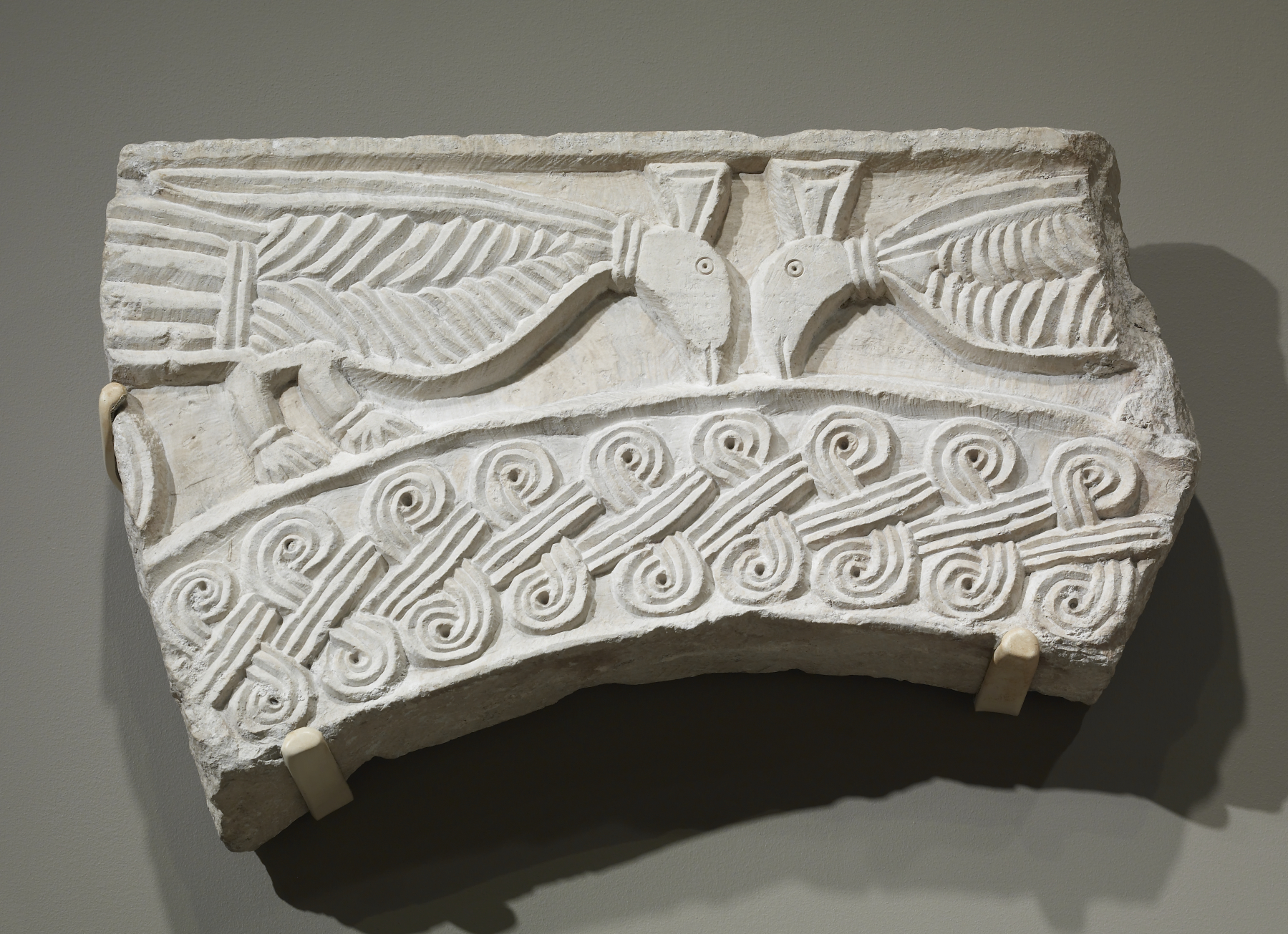
Two peacocks, symbolizing paradise and immortality, on a fragment from an eighth century ciborium from a church in Italy

Ancient Greeks believed that the flesh of peafowl did not decay after death, and so it became a symbol of immortality. Early Christianity adopted this symbolism, and thus many early Christian paintings and mosaics show the peacock. The peacock is still used in the Easter season – especially in the east. The "eyes" in the peacock's tail feathers symbolise the all-seeing God and – in some interpretations – the Church. A peacock drinking from a vase is used as a symbol of a Christian believer drinking from the waters of eternal life. The peacock can also symbolise the cosmos if one interprets its tail with its many "eyes" as the vault of heaven dotted by the sun, moon, and stars. By adoption of old Persian and Babylonian symbolism, in which the peacock was associated with Paradise and the Tree of Life, the bird is again associated with immortality. In Christian iconography, the peacock is often depicted next to the Tree of Life.

=== Pelican ===
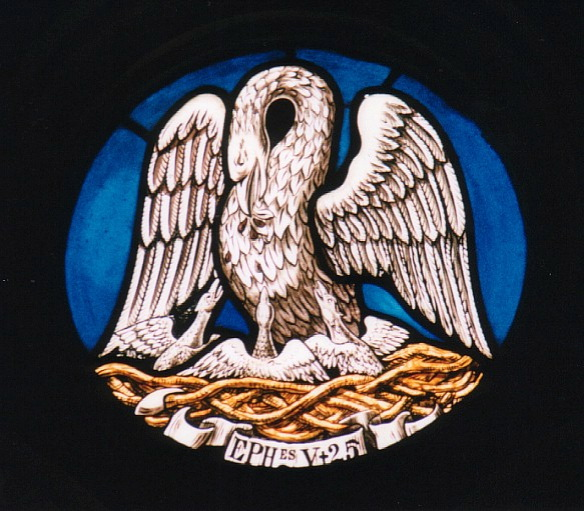
A pelican vulning itself

In medieval Europe, the pelican was thought to be particularly attentive to her young, to the point of providing her own blood by wounding her own breast when no other food was available. As a result, the pelican became a symbol of the Passion of Jesus and of the Eucharist from about the 12th century.

=== Anchor ===
Christians adopted the anchor as a symbol of hope in future existence because the anchor was regarded in ancient times as a symbol of safety. For Christians, Christ is the unfailing hope of all who believe in him: Saint Peter, Saint Paul, and several of the early Church Fathers speak in this sense. The Epistle to the Hebrews 6:19–20 for the first time connects the idea of hope with the symbol of the anchor.

A fragment of inscription discovered in the catacomb of St. Domitilla contains the anchor; it dates from the end of the 1st century. During the 2nd and 3rd centuries the anchor occurs frequently in the epitaphs of the catacombs. The most common form of anchor found in early Christian images was that in which one extremity terminates in a ring adjoining the cross-bar while the other ends in two curved branches or an arrowhead; There are, however, many deviations from this form. In general the anchor can symbolize hope, steadfastness, calm and composure.

=== Shamrock ===
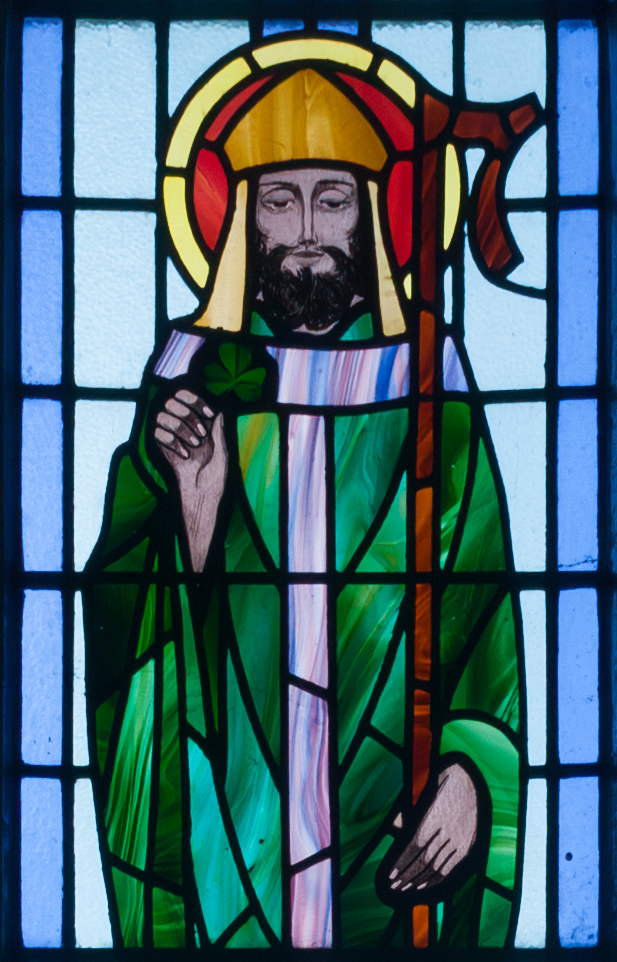
St. Patrick with shamrock, from St. Benin's Church, Wicklow, Ireland

Traditionally, the shamrock is said to have been used by Saint Patrick to illustrate the Christian doctrine of the Holy Trinity when Christianising Ireland in the 5th century. The legend goes that St. Patrick used the shamrock – a clover with three leaflets, native to Ireland – to illustrate the tripartite form of the Christian deity. Three parts on one plant to represent God the Father, God the Son, and The Holy Ghost.

=== Elemental symbols ===
The early Church made wide use of elemental symbols. Water has specific symbolic significance for Christians. Outside of baptism, water may represent cleansing or purity. Fire, especially in the form of a candle flame, represents both the Holy Spirit and light. These symbols derive from the Bible; for example from the tongues of fire that symbolized the Holy Spirit at Pentecost, and from Jesus' description of his followers as the light of the world; or God is a consuming fire found in Hebrews 12. Compare Jewish symbolism.

=== Lily crucifix ===
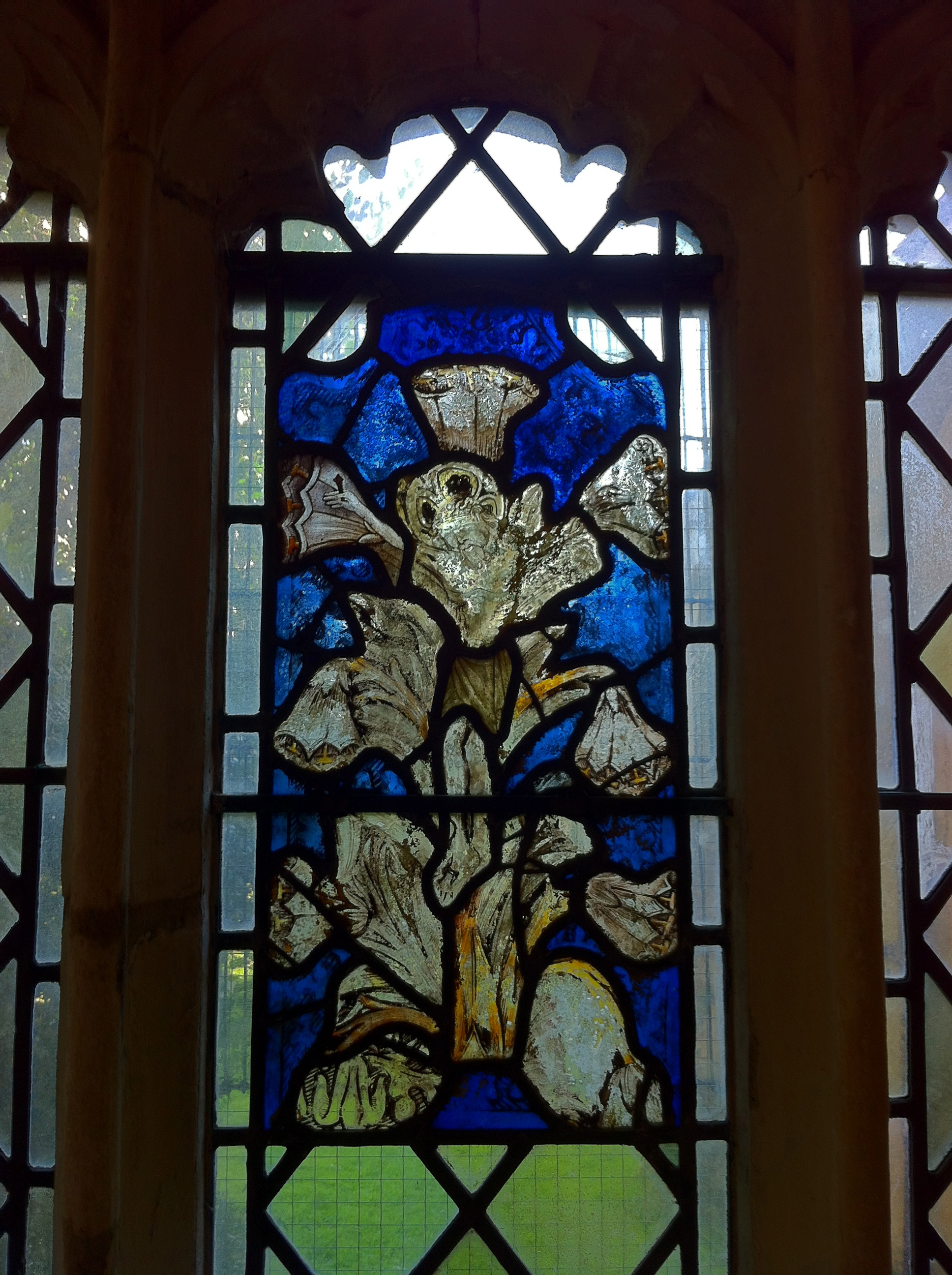
Lily Crucifix at Holy Trinity Church, Long Melford, Suffolk

The coat of arms of the Anglican diocese of Trinidad contains several Christian visual symbols.

A lily crucifix is a rare symbol of Anglican churches in England. It depicts Christ crucified on a lily, or holding such a plant. The symbolism may derive from the medieval belief that the Annunciation of Christ and his crucifixion occurred on the same day of the year, March 25. (The lily, in the context of the Annunciation, emphasises the purity of the Virgin Mary.)

The rare depictions of a lily crucifix in England include most notably a painting on a wall above the side altar at All Saints' Church, Godshill, Isle of Wight. Other examples include:

- An alabaster example on a tomb in St Mary's Church, Nottingham
- A wall painting in the Lady Chapel of St Helen's, Abingdon, Oxfordshire
- Five examples in glass as at Holy Trinity Church, Long Melford
- An image on the base of a font at All Saints, Great Glemham, Suffolk
- A possible lily crucifix in a bench end at St Mary, Binham, Norfolk
- Choir stall No. 8 in St Bartholomew's Church in Tong, Shropshire
- The Church of St John the Baptist, Wellington includes a lily crucifix in the carving of the centre mullion of the east window of the Lady chapel.
- A miniature in the Llanbeblig Book of Hours

== Tomb paintings ==
Christians from the very beginning adorned their catacombs with paintings of Christ, of the saints, of scenes from the Bible and of allegorical groups. The catacombs are the cradle of all Christian art. Early Christians accepted the art of their time and used it, as well as a poor and persecuted community could, to express their religious ideas. The use of deep, sometimes labyrinthine, catacombs for ritual burials indicates the poverty of early Christian communities: the unusual, multileveled, burial chambers were, at surface-level, small plots of land used as entrances to the tiered catacombs below, by early Christians unable to afford large areas of land, nor the corresponding taxes sometimes levied on real-estate, by regional authorities.

From the second half of the 1st century to the time of Constantine the Great catacomb Christianst] they buried their dead and celebrated their rites in these underground chambers. The Christian tombs were ornamented with indifferent or symbolic designs: palms, peacocks, with the chi-rho monogram, with bas-reliefs of Christ as the Good Shepherd, or seated between figures of saints, and sometimes with elaborate scenes from the New Testament.

Other Christian symbols include the dove (symbolic of the Holy Spirit), the sacrificial lamb (symbolic of Christ's sacrifice), the vine (symbolizing the necessary connectedness of the Christian with Christ) and many others. These all derive from the writings found in the New Testament. Other decorations included garlands, ribands, stars and landscapes, presumably with symbolic meanings.

== Colors ==
Different colors are used in Christian churches to symbolise the liturgical seasons. They are often of clerical vestments, frontals and altar hangings. There is some variation between denominations, but below is a general description:

- White – Used at festivals such as Christmas, Easter, Corpus Christi; also for the feasts of St Mary and saints who were not martyrs.
- Red – Used for Pentecost, Palm Sunday, Holy Cross Day, the Precious Blood, and feasts of saints who were martyred.
- Green – Used for 'ordinary' Sundays, in the periods after Pentecost or Trinity and after Epiphany.
- Purple – Used in Advent and Lent. In many churches Lent is marked by unbleached linen to suggest penitence.
- Blue – The color of St Mary.
- Black – For funerals and requiems.
- Yellow – Regarded as the color of jealousy and treason; hence Judas Iscariot is shown in yellow robes.

== Symbols of Christian Churches ==
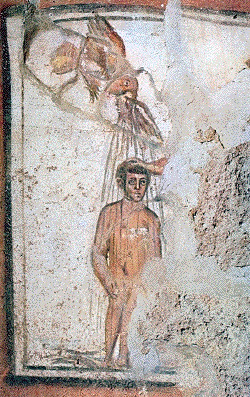
Baptism in early Christian art

=== Sacraments ===
Some of the oldest symbols within the Christian Church are the sacraments, the number of which vary between denominations. Always included are Eucharist and baptism. The others which may or may not be included are ordination, unction, confirmation, penance and marriage. They are together commonly described as an outward and visible sign of an inward and spiritual grace or, as in Catholic theology, "outward signs and media of grace."

The rite is seen as a symbol of the spiritual change or event that takes place. In the Eucharist, the bread and wine are symbolic of the body and shed blood of Jesus, and in Catholic theology, become the actual Body of Christ and Blood of Christ through Transubstantiation.

The rite of baptism is symbolic of the cleansing of the sinner by God, and, especially where baptism is by immersion, of the spiritual death and resurrection of the baptized person. Opinion differs as to the symbolic nature of the sacraments, with some Protestant denominations considering them entirely symbolic, and Catholics, Orthodox, Lutherans, and some Reformed Christians believing that the outward rites truly do, by the power of God, act as media of grace.

=== Icons ===
The tomb paintings of the early Christians led to the development of icons. An icon is an image, picture, or representation; it is likeness that has symbolic meaning for an object by signifying or representing it, or by analogy, as in semiotics. The use of icons, however, was never without opposition. It was recorded that, "there is no century between the fourth and the eighth in which there is not some evidence of opposition to images even within the Church. Nonetheless, popular favor for icons guaranteed their continued existence, while no systematic apologia for or against icons, or doctrinal authorization or condemnation of icons yet existed.

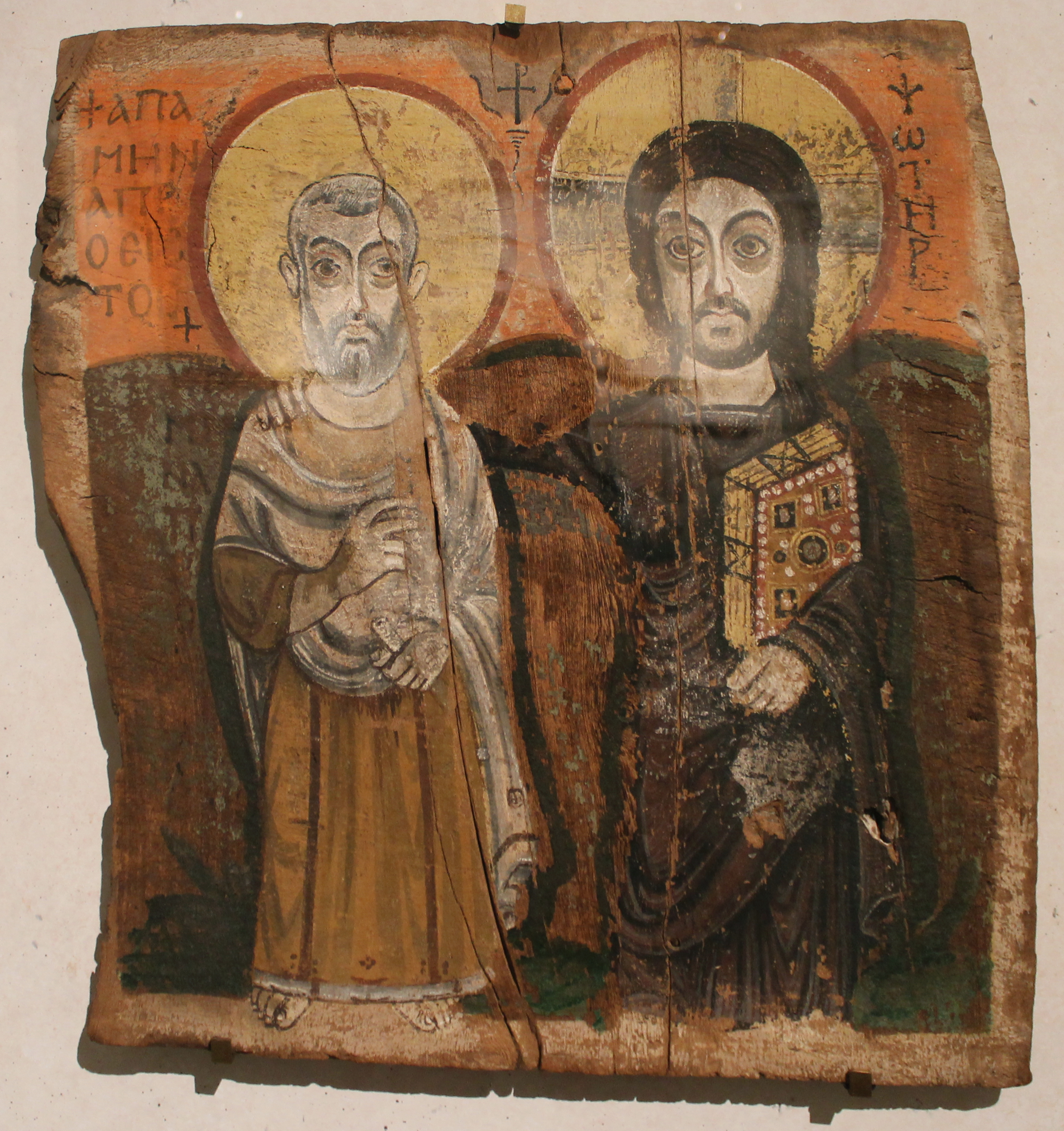
Christ and Saint Menas, 6th-century Coptic icon, Louvre

Though significant in the history of religious doctrine, the Byzantine controversy over images is not seen as of primary importance in Byzantine history. "Few historians still hold it to have been the greatest issue of the period..."

The Byzantine Iconoclasm began when images were banned by Emperor Leo III the Isaurian sometime between 726 and 730. Under his son Constantine V, a council forbidding image veneration was held at Hieria near Constantinople in 754. Image veneration was later reinstated by the Empress Regent Irene, under whom another council was held reversing the decisions of the previous iconoclast council and taking its title as Seventh Ecumenical Council. The council anathematized all who held to iconoclasm, i.e. those who held that veneration of images constitutes idolatry. Then the ban was enforced again by Leo V in 815. And finally icon veneration was decisively restored by Empress Regent Theodora.

Today icons are used particularly among Eastern Orthodox, Oriental Orthodox, Assyrian and Eastern Catholic Churches.

=== Domes ===
The traditional mortuary symbolism of the dome led it to be used in Christian central-type martyriums in the Syrian area, the growing popularity of which spread the form. The spread and popularity of the cult of relics also transformed the domed central-type martyriums into the domed churches of mainstream Christianity. The use of centralized buildings for the burials of heroes was common by the time the Anastasis Rotunda was built in Jerusalem, but the use of centralized domed buildings to symbolize resurrection was a Christian innovation.

In Italy in the 4th century, baptisteries began to be built like domed mausoleums and martyriums, which spread in the 5th century. This reinforced the theological emphasis on baptism as a re-experience of the death and resurrection of Jesus Christ. The octagon, which is transitional between the circle and the square, came to represent Jesus' resurrection in early Christianity and was used in the ground plans of martyriums and baptisteries for that reason. The domes themselves were sometimes octagonal, rather than circular. Nicholas Temple proposes the imperial reception hall as an additional source of influence on baptisteries, conveying the idea of reception or redemptive passage to salvation. Iconography of assembled figures and the throne of Christ would also relate to this.

Portraits of Christ began to replace gold crosses at the centers of church domes beginning in the late eighth century, which Charles Stewart suggests may have been an over-correction in favor of images after the periods of Iconoclasm in the eighth and ninth centuries. One of the first was on the nave dome of Hagia Sophia in Thessaloniki, and this eventually developed into the bust image known as the Pantokrator. Otto Demus writes that Middle Byzantine churches were decorated in a systematic manner and can be seen as having three zones of decoration, with the holiest at the top. This uppermost zone contained the dome, drum and apse. The dome was reserved for the Pantokrator (meaning "ruler of all"), the drum usually contained images of angels or prophets, and the apse semi-dome usually depicted the Virgin Mary, typically holding the Christ child and flanked by angels.

== Symbols adopted from Judaism ==
The influence of Judaism upon Christian symbolism as early as the 2nd and 3rd centuries CE, is apparent both in painting and in sculpture, the most frequent motives being those that occur in the Mishnah as formulas for prayer on fast-days. The prayer beginning with the words "Mi she-'anah", which was included in the selihah at an early date, was adopted in the Christian ritual as the litany "Libera domine". This litany was figuratively used in a certain sequence as a symbol, for the sacrifice of Isaac was regarded as a symbol of the crucifixion of Jesus, since the early religions, and the act of sacrifice emblemized the death on the cross.

Abraham was represented as the symbol of the power of faith and Isaac as the sacrificed redeemer. The ascension of Elijah (english : Elia or Elias) was believed to typify the ascension of Jesus Christ, who was regarded by Christian symbolism as an analogue to Elijah, although this ascension was also taken as a type of the general resurrection from the dead. Job sitting among the ashes was the symbol of patience and of the power of resistance of the flesh; and Hananiah, Mishael, and Azariah in the fiery furnace typified steadfastness in persecution and faith in the aid of God. Christian sarcophagi contained artistic representations of the fall of man, Noah and the ark, scenes from the life of Moses in three variations, Joshua, David, and Daniel.

== See also ==
- Arma Christi
- Bestiary
- Christian demonology
- Christian flag
- Coat of arms of the Holy See
- Cross and Crown
- Flag of Vatican City
- Holy Spirit in Christian art
- Icon
- Jesus, King of the Jews
- Lamb of God
- List of flags with Christian symbolism
- Nordic Cross flag
- Peace symbols
- Religious symbolism
- Saint symbolism
- Sator Square
- Shield of the Trinity
- Trefoil
- Triquetra
- Wordless Book
