= Godshill =

Village on the Isle of Wight, England

Coordinates: 50.633°N 1.256°W

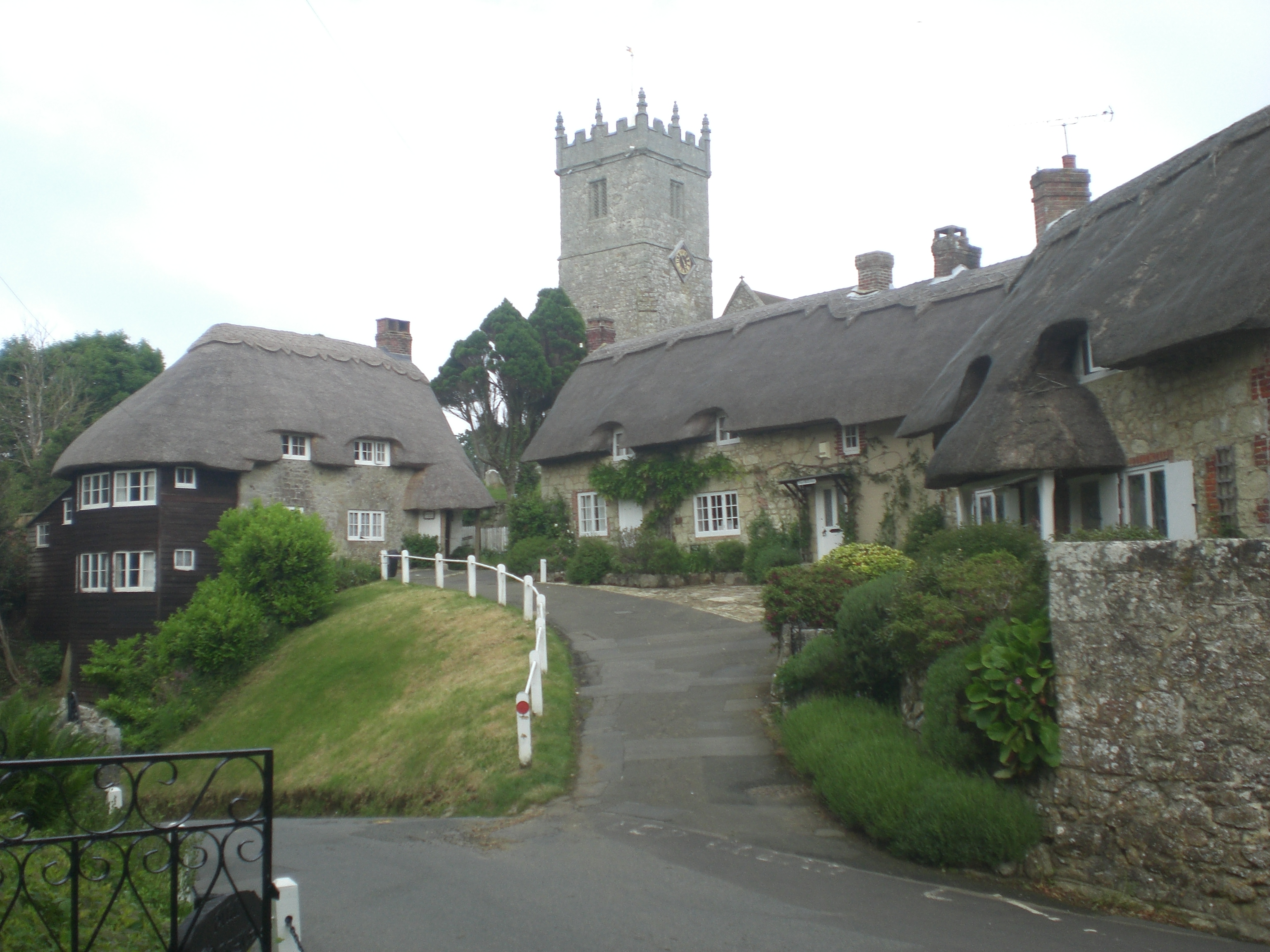
- Thatched cottages in Godshill

- Location within the Isle of Wight
- Area: 19.7930 km^{2} (7.6421 sq mi)
- Population: 1,459 (2011 census including Roud and Sandford)
  - Density: 74/km^{2} (190/sq mi)
- OS grid reference: SZ527817
- Civil parish: Godshill
- Unitary authority: Isle of Wight
- Ceremonial county: Isle of Wight
- Region: South East
- Country: England
- Sovereign state: United Kingdom
- Post town: VENTNOR
- Postcode district: PO38
- Dialling code: 01983
- Police: Hampshire and Isle of Wight
- Fire: Hampshire and Isle of Wight
- Ambulance: Isle of Wight
- UK Parliament: Isle of Wight West

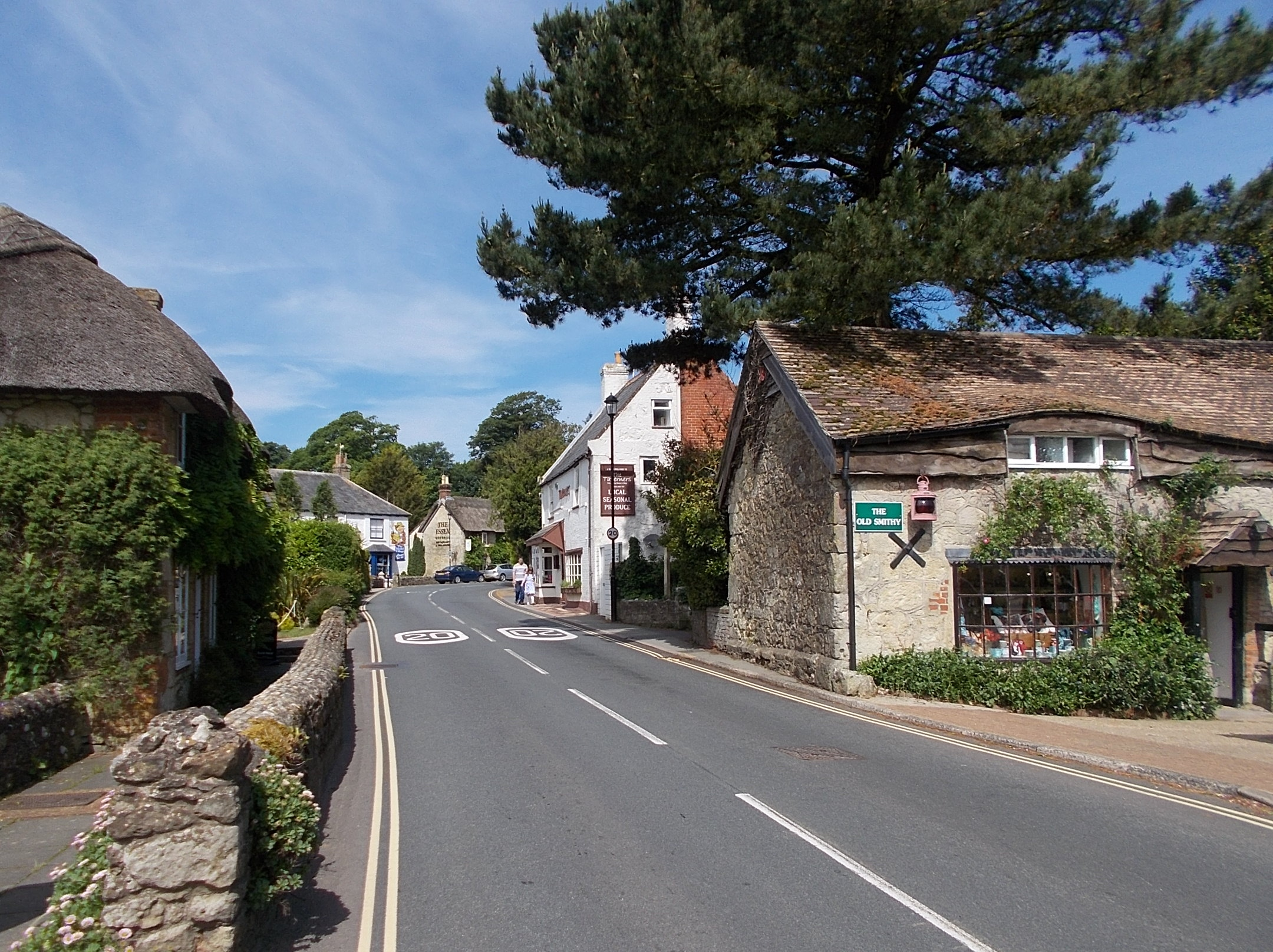
Main Road, Godshill

Godshill is a village and civil parish on the Isle of Wight, England, with a population of 1,459 at the 2011 Census. It lies between Newport and Ventnor in the southeast of the island.

== Name ==
The name means 'the hill associated with a Christian or heathen god' from Old English god and hyll. It could also mean a pagan god, as the hill the church was built on was a site for pagan worship. However, even if it is associated with the Christian god, it could still be implying that it was used for pagan worship, and then transferred to Christian.

1142-1147: Godeshul

~1145: Godeshelle

1183: Godeshull

1255: Godeshille

1311: Goddeshulle

1449: Godyshille

== History ==
Ford Farm near Godshill was the site of the first Isle of Wight Festival in 1968, which attracted 10,000 people to see acts such as Jefferson Airplane and Arthur Brown.

Godshill Park House dates from about 1760 and was built as a home farm to serve the Appuldurcombe Estate. In around 1860 the house was extended, adding the Regency front, and became a private residence. It was used in the Second World War as an army hospital.

== Today ==
Godshill is a much-visited tourism destination on the Isle of Wight. The village has thatched cottages and All Saints Church on the hill. There are tea rooms, gift shops, a bakery and two pubs: "The Griffin", with a griffin-shaped maze and children's playground, and "The Taverners".

Public transport is provided by Southern Vectis buses, routes 2 and 3.

== Governance ==
Godshill is part of the electoral ward of Central Rural, previously Godshill and Wroxall. The population of the previous ward at the 2011 Census was 3,212.

== Godshill Model Village ==
Since 1952, Godshill has been the home of a model village portraying itself and Shanklin's old village at a scale of 1:10. It is so detailed and on such a large scale that it contains a scale model of the model village. Within that second model there is a third, even smaller model of the village. The site is also an RHS Partner Garden showcasing around 2,000 conifers and shrubs. Many are coarse bonsai-treated trees, to retain scale with the models. Red squirrels can at times be seen in the garden.

== All Saints' Church ==
The parish church is a medieval building noted for its medieval wall painting of a Lily crucifix, and a stained-glass window by William Morris.
