= Bipartite (theology) =

Christian theology

In Christian theological anthropology, bipartite refers to the view that a human being is composed of two distinct components, material and immaterial, body and soul. The two parts were created interdependent and in harmony, though corrupted through sin.

Alternative theological views of human composition include tripartite and unitary (or monistic) views.

== Explanations of bipartite anthropology ==
Advocates of bipartite theology may quote the Reformation theologian John Calvin in support of a bipartite view. Calvin held that while the Bible often uses "soul" and "spirit" interchangeably, there are subtle differences when the two terms are used together.

Some have held that the soul and the spirit are interchangeable and that this aspect of human inner life is expressed in a form of literary parallelism. Such parallelism can be found elsewhere in Scripture, such as the Psalms and the Proverbs. Others have used chemical analogies.

R. C. Sproul (1939-2017) holds that the body and the soul are two substances which are not in conflict. They are two natures or substances, divine and human, united in one person. In contrast with various Greek philosophical views, the material body (like the soul) is not seen as inherently evil, but inherently good. The Christian doctrine of salvation therefore does not imply a redemption from the body, but a redemption of the body and the soul.

== See also ==
- Christian anthropology
- Hylomorphism
- Monism
- Substance dualism
- Tripartite (theology)
