= Tripartite (theology) =

Christian theology

In Christian theology, the tripartite view (trichotomy) holds that each human combines three distinct components: body, spirit, and soul. In contrast, the bipartite view (dichotomy), while accepting the body as distinct, takes "soul" and "spirit" as different terms for the same entity (the spiritual soul).

== Scriptural basis ==
The primary proof texts for this position are as follows:

Genesis 2:7

"Then the LORD God formed man of the dust of the ground, and breathed into his nostrils the breath of life; and man became a living soul." (JPS Tanakh)

Trichotomists see in Genesis 2:7 the first implications of the constituents of man's nature. Franz Delitzsch, commenting on this passage, says, "We cannot consider with sufficient care Gen. 2:7; for this one verse is of such deep significance that interpretation can never exhaust it: it is the foundation of all true anthropology and psychology." John Bickford Heard refers to Genesis 2:7 as a revelation of the material cause, the formal or efficient cause, and the final cause of man's threefold nature. The material cause—the Lord God formed man from the dust of the ground. The formal or efficient cause—God breathed into his nostrils the breath (neshamah) of life. The final cause—man became a living soul (nephesh). The question is whether Genesis 2:7 refers to two or to three distinct facts and thus whether Genesis 2:7 describes two or three distinct parts of man's constitution. Trichotomists believe that God's breath of life, when breathed into man's body of dust, became man's human spirit. Proverbs 20:27 uses the same Hebrew word (neshamah) for the spirit of man, indicating that God's breathe of life and man's spirit are closely related. George Boardman describes the Divine Pneuma and the human pneuma as "constitutionally akin" while Heard ascribes to them the same nature. For Michael Schmaus and most trichotomists, the human spirit is the focal point of the image of God.

1 Thessalonians 5:23

"And the God of peace himself sanctify you wholly; and may your spirit and soul and body be preserved entire, without blame at the coming of our Lord Jesus Christ." (ASV)

Proponents of the tripartite view claim that this verse spells out clearly the three components of the human, emphasized by the descriptors of "whole" and "completely". Opponents argue that spirit and soul are merely a repetition of synonyms, a common form used elsewhere in scripture to add the idea completeness.

1 Corinthians 2:12–3:4

12 Now we have received, not the spirit of the world, but the Spirit who is from God, that we might know the things freely given to us by God, 13 which things we also speak, not in words taught by human wisdom, but in those taught by the Spirit, bringing together spiritual (men, pneumatikois) with spiritual (things, pneumatikà). 14 But the soulish man (psychikós) does not accept the things of the Spirit of God; for they are foolishness to him, and he cannot understand them, because they are spiritually appraised. 15 But the spiritual man (ho pneumatikòs) appraises all things, yet he himself is appraised by no man. 16 For "who has known the mind of the Lord, that he should instruct Him?" But we have the mind of Christ.
3:1 And I, brothers, could not speak to you as to spiritual men (pneumatikois), but as to carnal men (sarkínois), as to infants in Christ. 2 (I gave you) milk to drink, not solid food, for you were not yet able (to receive it), for even now you are not yet able, 3 for you are still carnal (sarkikoí). For since there is jealousy and strife among you, are you not carnal (sarkikoí), and are you not walking like mere men? 4 For when someone says on the one hand, “I am of Paul,” but another, “I am of Apollos,” are you (acting like) men?

In this passage, the Apostle Paul divides men into three categories based on their responses to apostolic teaching: those who are spiritual (pneumatikos, 2.13, 15; 3.1), those who are soulish (psychikós; 2.14) and the Corinthians who are carnal (sarkivós; 3.1, 3). Each is driven or controlled by some aspect of their being, whether the spirit, the soul or the flesh. If the spirit and soul are identical, Paul's argument is meaningless.

Hebrews 4:12

"For the word of God is alive and active. Sharper than any double-edged sword, it penetrates even to dividing soul and spirit, joints and marrow; it judges the thoughts and attitudes of the heart." (NIV)

Proponents of the tripartite view claim that this verse spells out that there is a clear difference between soul and spirit, though they may be so intertwined and similar that they would be difficult to separate without scriptural clarity. Opponents argue that there is no real separation here (though there must be some difference, at least in emphasis, if two different words are used), but the two are only used as a metaphor of things difficult to differentiate, like the thoughts and intentions of the heart.

Colossians 2:11

" in whom ye were also circumcised with a circumcision not made with hands, in the putting off of the body of the flesh, in the circumcision of Christ;"

Before salvation, the soul was stuck to the body.

Romans 7:22–23

"For I delight in the law of God after the inward man; but I see a different law in my members, warring against the law of my mind, and bringing me into captivity under the law of sin which is in my members."

After salvation, the soul is trying to follow the spirit. The spirit is known to be the new man or new nature. At the same time, the soul is trying not to follow the old man or old nature (body). The soul can either follow the spirit and do what is right or follow the body and do what is wrong.

== Historical development ==
=== Old Testament ===
The Old Testament consistently uses three primary words to describe the parts of man: basar (flesh), which refers to the external, material aspect of man (mostly in emphasizing human frailty); nephesh, which refers to the soul as well as the whole person or life; and ruach which is used to refer to the human spirit (ruach can mean "wind", "breath", or "spirit" depending on the context; cf. Ezek. 37:1–14 where ruach is translated as all three). In the Old Testament basar occurs 266 times, nephesh occurs 754 times, and ruach occurs 378 times with at least 100 times referring to the human spirit.

According to trichotomists, the full anthropology of man and the proper distinction between his inward parts (Psalm 51:6) while latent in the Old Testament, does not receive a clear treatment until the New Testament. Genesis 2:7 "rather implies than asserts the trichotomy of spirit, soul, and body" and must be "illuminated by the light of subsequent Scriptures" to reveal its full import. This corresponds with what many theologians call progressive revelation. As with Genesis 2:7, other verses in the Old Testament directly correlate man's spirit (ruach) with God's breath (neshamah) (Job 27:3; 32:8; 33:4; 34:14). However, the revelation of the human spirit is obscure in the Old Testament, as is the revelation of the Holy Spirit or the Trinity. Not until the New Testament is the nature of God fully and explicitly revealed and likewise not until the New Testament (especially the Epistles) is the nature of man fully and explicitly revealed.

Heard explains:

We have only another caution to make before entering on our task; it is that revelation being a progressive manifestation of the truth of God, the discovery of man's nature must also be progressive. In the same way that the plurality of Persons in the Godhead, and their relation to each other, was only gradually unfolded in Scripture, so we may expect it to be with the trichotomy of man's nature, spirit, soul, and body. As in the case of the doctrine of the Trinity it was not fully understood until the Spirit was given, so the distinction of Psyche and Pneuma is implied rather than taught when the race was still in its spiritual infancy....It would be out of harmony with the “analogy of the faith,” if the tripartite nature of man were fully described in those books of the Bible which only contain implied hints of the plurality of persons in the Godhead. All we shall see of the subject will confirm this view of the harmonious way in which doctrines and duties, the nature of God and the nature of man, are unfolded together.

The relation between body and soul was not clear to the ancients, much less the relation between soul and spirit. The physiology and psychology of the Hebrew and the Archaic Greek world were speculative, and so, reasoning on imperfect data, they spoke of various physical organs as the seat of thought, feeling, and decision. The heart primarily was the seat of thought and feeling, the kidneys the seat of reflection (Psalms 16:7; 26:2; Proverbs 23:6), and the bowels the seat of affection (Genesis. 43:30; Philippians 1:8). It wasn't until the Alexandrian physicians (e.g. Erasistratus and Herophilus) and the Classical Greek philosophers (e.g. Plato and Aristotle) that a more accurate understanding of man's inward parts began to emerge.

=== Intertestamental period ===
During the intertestamental period, two factors shaped and "enlarged the semantic domain of the Greek and Hebrew words for the parts of man" and set the stage for a more complete and accurate understanding of the nature of man. The first factor was Greek philosophy. The Greek philosophers, unlike the Greek poets, clearly distinguished the material from the immaterial part of man, defined the functions of the soul in more precise terms, and in general expanded the vocabulary for the parts of man. The second factor was the translation of the Septuagint. The translators of the Septuagint incorporated the linguistic developments of the Greek philosophers into the biblical revelation when they translated the Hebrew into Greek.

Good explains:

Although the classical Greek writers did not arrive at the same realization as the New Testament writers, their use of certain key words in Greek gave the New Testament writers a greater and more precise vocabulary to work with in describing the parts of man. After Plato and Aristotle, there was a richer array of words to describe the inward parts of man, particularly the mind (e.g., nous, noëma, di-anoia, and phronëma).

Dichotomists often argue against the tripartite view of man by discrediting it through its apparent connection with Platonism. However, Plato and the Greek philosophers, strictly speaking, were dichotomists. Plato did divide man into three parts, but his trichotomy was different from Paul's trichotomy in essence, function, and primacy. Plato's divisions were a tripartite division of the soul. He conceived of man's soul as consisting of an appetitive, irascible (spirited), and rational element. In Timaeus 30 he divides man into nous (mind), psychë (soul), and söma (body), with nous being the noblest part of the soul. When Plato does speak of spirit (thumos; not the pneuma used by Paul) he means something essentially different from Paul. The three parts of man are not equivalent for Plato and Paul, and the master faculty for Plato (nous) is a subordinate faculty for Paul. "To discredit trichotomy by a similarity with Platonism confuses similarity with source. One could likewise attribute the source of the dichotomist view with Greek dichotomy (matter and spirit); some writers have argued for such a connection."

=== New Testament ===
Trichotomists believe that a tripartite view of man is clearly taught throughout the New Testament. The writers of the New Testament, like the writers of the Old Testament, consistently use three primary words to describe the components of man's nature: sarx, used 151 times (and söma about 129 times), refers to the physical aspect of humanity; psychë, used 105 times, refers to the psycho-logical aspect of humanity; and pneuma, used 385 times total in the New Testament, refers to the human spirit in approximately 80 of those instances. Finer distinctions can be made between the functions and relations of man's inward parts.

A full treatment of man's nature must consider the New Testament use of such words as flesh, body, spirit, soul, heart, mind, and conscience. For instance, dichotomists often dismiss the distinction between soul and spirit in 1 Thessalonians 5:23 as a piling up of terms for emphasis, that spirit and soul is "rhetorical tautology". They claim that if 1 Thessalonians 5:23 proves that man is composed of three parts, then Mark 12:30 must prove that man is made of four parts since Jesus enumerates heart, soul, mind, and strength. However, trichotomists see only three parts here based on their understanding of how the Bible uses the terms heart, soul, and mind. The heart is a composition of the soul plus the conscience, and the mind is the leading part of the soul. Thus, Mark 12:30 is within the parameters of a tripartite view of man.

=== Early Church ===
The tripartite view of man was considered an orthodox interpretation in the first three centuries of the church, and many of the early Church Fathers (see Supporters of a Tripartite View chart) taught that man is made up of body, soul, and spirit. Irenaeus, Tatian, Melito, Didymus of Alexandria, Justin Martyr, Clement of Alexandria, Origen, Gregory of Nyssa, and Basil of Cesaraea, all held to the distinction firmly according to its supporters.

However, there arose primarily three historical errors, the fear of which have caused a "prejudice against trichotomy": the pseudo-Gnostic view, the Apollinarian error, and the semi-Pelagian error. "But", Delitzsch argues, "in the face of all these errors, its opponents must confess that man may be regarded trichotomically, without in the least degree implying the adoption of such erroneous views."

==== Apollinarianism ====
In the 4th century, after Apollinaris of Laodicea employed it in a manner impinging on the perfect humanity of Jesus, the tripartite view of man was gradually discredited by association. Apart from this heretical doctrine, which was condemned at the First Council of Constantinople in 381, Apollinaris was an orthodox theologian and contemporary of Athanasius of Alexanderia and Basil of Cesaraea.

In History of the Christian Church, Philip Schaff remarks:

Apollinaris, therefore, taught the deity of Christ, but denied the completeness (teleiotes) of his humanity, and, taking his departure from the Nicene postulate of the homoousion, ran into the Arian heresy, which likewise put the divine Logos in the place of the human spirit in Christ.

The fact that an early heresy called Apollinarism emerged is witness that the early church held the tripartite view of man, according to John Pester. This heresy taught that in Christ the human spirit was replaced by pure, divine Logos. If the early church taught that man consisted only of body and soul, this heresy could not have gained traction. Some theologians believe that Apollinaris, however, confused the Pauline trichotomy with the Platonic trichotomy by confounding the pneuma (ru’ah) with the nous.

Heard explains:

The Greek Fathers, generally speaking, understood the psychology of Scripture aright; but unfortunately confounding the Platonic Logos or Nous with the Pneuma of the New Testament, they either distinguished the pneumatical and psychical as the intellectual and the carnal man respectively (which was the root error of the Gnostics), or confounded in a semi-pantheistic way the human Pneuma with the divine, which, in the case of Origen and Apollinaris, led to distinct heresies, which the Church afterwards formally condemned. The consequence of this was, that in the reaction against these errors, the Latin Church generally, as guided by Augustine and Jerome, rejected altogether the distinction between Psyche and Pneuma, for which the Latin tongue was not flexible enough to find equivalents, and so the usual dichotomy of man into body and soul only became the prevailing view throughout the West.

==== Semi-Pelagianism ====
After Apollinarianism was condemned at Constantinople, another heresy tarnished the Pauline distinction of soul and spirit. The semi-Pelagians used the distinction to teach that "the spirit is excepted from the original sin which affected the body and soul" and therefore human nature is essentially good and retains the free will to initiate salvation. Contrary to Pelagius' view of human nature, Augustine of Hippo taught that because of original sin, the human nature we receive at birth has been "wounded, hurt, damaged, destroyed" and that, therefore, man is incapable of doing or desiring good apart from the sovereignty of grace. In maintaining the doctrine of original sin against the Pelagian party, Augustine ultimately held to the dichotomist conception of man and thought it safer to pass by the distinction of soul and spirit as an "unprofitable distinction".

Heard, however, argues that the distinction of soul and spirit "so far from making void the doctrine of original sin, actually confirms and explains it":

Had Augustine but recognized the trichotomy, and taught that the ruach, or pneuma, or spiritus—i.e. the inspired and Godlike part of man—was deadened by the fall, and that in that state of spiritual injury a propagation of soul and body from Adam to his posterity must ex traduce carry with it a defective, and hence a diseased constitution, his refutation of Pelagius would have been sufficiently convincing, without hurrying him into an exaggeration in the opposite extreme...

Augustine's influence on the history of Western Christian thought, in form and content, swayed decisively the decision for the dichotomous view of man. Heard says, "the authority of Augustine decided the course of the Western Church in rejecting the distinction as mystical, and tending to deprave the doctrine of man's fall and corruption." George S. Hendry in a chapter entitled, The Holy Spirit and the Human Spirit, concludes "the denial of a created spirit in man, both in ancient and in modern theology, is bound up with a one-sided, Augustinian conception of grace."

Interest in the human spirit waned in the mediaeval church, "whose tendencies were scholastic rather than exegetical, and whose philosophy was thoroughly Aristotelian."

=== Reformation ===
With the Reformation, the rejection of trichotomy stems from an apparent incompatibility with their doctrine of sovereign grace, following Augustine. Since Plato, the conception of the human spirit involved an aspiration (eros) for the beautiful, good, and eternal. Early Christians similarly expressed this longing of the human spirit as a longing for the divine Spirit of God and thus established a correlation between philosophy and theology. This insatiable longing was seen as the “index of an ontological orientation of the creature toward the Creator." Augustine expresses this longing in his Confessions when he says, “Thou has made us for Thyself and our hearts are restless till they rest in Thee.”

For Thomas Aquinas, “it is natural to ascribe the desire of the finite for the infinite to the human spirit.” Martin Luther identifies the human spirit as “the highest, deepest, noblest part of man, by which he is able to grasp incomprehensible, invisible, and eternal things.” It soon came to be felt, however, that such a view could not be held in conjunction with the main emphasis of the Reformation. The longing for God, even though unconscious, obscure or misinterpreted, in unregenerated man clashed with the Reformers’ understanding of total depravity. They reasoned that since man is spiritually dead, he is totally passive and cannot even aspire for God. Thus “man was to all intents and purposes ‘de-spirited’.” However, this reduced man to an inanimate object, like a stone or tree, and severely undermined man’s humanity. Man was "a kind of unfeeling and inept material that had to be moved from one place to another." The doctrine of sola gratia, under the influence of Augustine's understanding of grace, undermined human freedom by stressing that grace is not merely indispensable but irresistible. "Fundamentally, the objection was that Augustine had resolved the paradox of inevitability and responsibility at the expense of responsibility, and that he glorified grace by belittling nature and free will." Hendry, a Reformed theologian, and other trichotomists do not see any necessary conflict between man possessing a distinct, created human spirit and the sovereignty of grace, so long as "the nature of spirit and its activity be properly understood."

Among the Reformers, Luther stands out, possibly, as an exception to the prevailing dichotomist view. Pelikan notes that in Luther's writings there is support for the “trichotomist idea of human nature as made up of body, soul, and spirit; but there are also places in his writings which seem to speak for the dichotomist idea of man's material and nonmaterial nature as the two parts of his being." In his Biblical Psychology, Delitzsch also ascribes the trichotomous view to Luther, in an appendix entitled "Luther's Trichotomy" where he quotes at length Luther's commentary on the Magnificat.

Luther writes:

Scripture divides man into three parts, as says St Paul (1 Thess. 5:23)... And every one of these three, together with the entire man, is also divided in another way into two portions, which are there called Spirit and Flesh. Which division is not natural, but attributive; i.e. nature has three portions spirit, soul, and body... In the tabernacle fashioned by Moses there were three separate compartments. The first was called the holy of holies: here was God's dwelling place, and in it there was no light. The second was called the holy place; here stood a candle-stick with seven arms and seven lamps. The third was called the outer court; this lay under the open sky and in the full light of the sun. In this tabernacle we have a figure of the Christian man. His spirit is the holy of holies, where God dwells in the darkness of faith, where no light is; for he believes that which he neither sees nor feels nor comprehends. His soul is the holy place, with its seven lamps, that is, all manner of reason, discrimination, knowledge, and understanding of visible and bodily things. His body is the forecourt, open to all, so that men may see his works and manner of life.

Others, including John Bickford Heard, George Boardman, James Stalker, Watchman Nee, and Witness Lee have used the tabernacle to illustrate the tripartite man.

At the turn of the 19th century in Germany, there was a major resurgence of interest in the tripartite view of man (see chart). Hendry accounts the initial thrust of this resurgence to philosophical concerns. "The development of the philosophy of spirit in post-Kantian idealism, originating in Germany, may be interpreted historically as a revolt against the suppression of the spirit in Protestant theology; for it was in its initial intention an affirmation, or reaffirmation, of the human spirit."

== Works ==
Many of the theologians below are cited by Louis Berkhof's Systematic Theology, Augustus H. Strong's Systematic Theology, Jan Jacob van Oosterzee's Christian Dogmatics, John Bickford Heard's Tripartite Nature of Man, and Henri de Lubac's History and Spirit.

Name	Born	Died	Theological tradition	Major works supporting Trichotomy	Referenced by
Justin Martyr	100	165	Early Christian apologist	On the Resurrection	Van Oosterzee, Heard
Tatian	120	180	Early Christian apologist	Tatian's Address to the Greeks	Van Oosterzee; A Dictionary of Early Christian Beliefs
Clement of Alexandria	150	215	Church Father		Berkhof
Melito	?	180	Bishop of Sardis		Van Oosterzee
Hippolytus of Rome	170	235	Presbyter of the Church in Rome	Commentary on Daniel, Book 2, Ch. 38	Henri de Lubac
Origen	184	253	Church Father	De Principiis, Book 2, On the Soul	Van Oosterzee, Berkhof, Henri De Lubac
Irenaeus	2nd century	202	Church Father	Against Heresies	Van Oosterzee
Eusebius	260/265	339/340	Roman historian & Bishop of Caesarea	Commentary on the Psalms 102, v. 20	Henri de Lubac
Apollinarius	?	390	Bishop of Laodicea in Syria		Berkhof
Didymus of Alexandria	313	398	Coptic Church theologian	Commentary on Ecclesiastes; Commentary on the Psalms	Richard A Layton; Henri de Lubac
Basil of Caesarea	329	379	Church Father	Homily 21	Henri de Lubac
Gregory of Nazianzus	329	389/390	Church Father and Archbishop of Constantinople	Poems, bk. 1, sec. 1, 8 (On the Soul)	Henri de Lubac
Gregory of Nyssa	335	395	Church Father	On the Making of Man 8.4–6	Berkhof
John of Damascus	645/676	749	Church Father		Strong
John Climacus	7th century	?	7th-century Christian monk	The Ladder of Divine Ascent	
Martin Luther	1483	1546	German Reformer	Commentary on the Magnificat	Delitzsch
Thomas Jackson	1579	1640	English theologian, Arminian		
Thomas White	1593	1676	Roman Catholic priest and scholar		
Philip Doddridge	1702	1751	English Nonconformist leader	A Paraphrase and Notes on the First Epistle of Paul the Apostle to the Thessalonians	
Magnus Friedrich Roos	1727	1803	German Lutheran theologian	Outlines of Psychology drawn from the Holy Scriptures	Berkhof
Seraphim of Sarov	1754	1833	Russian Orthodox Theologian	St. Seraphim of Sarov's Conversation with Nicholas Motovilov	
Adam Clarke	1762	1832	British Methodist theologian	Clarke's Commentary on the Bible	
Gotthilf Heinrich von Schubert	1780	1860	German Theologian		Van Oosterzee
Karl Friedrich Goschel	1784	1861	Prussian Right Hegelian	Herzog, Realencyclopadie, article "Seele"	Strong
August Neander	1789	1850	German theologian and church historian	History of the Planting and Training of the Christian Church by the Apostles	Strong
Hermann Olshausen	1796	1839	German theologian	Opuscula Theologica and Commentary on 1 Thes. 5:23	Strong, Berkhof
Leonhard Usteri	1799	1833	Swiss Reformed theologian	Entwickelung Des Paulinischen Lehrbegriffes	Strong
August Friedrich Christian Vilmar	1800	1868	German Neo-Lutheran theologian	Dogmatik: Akademische Vorlesungen	G. C. Berkouwer
Heinrich August Wilhelm Meyer	1800	1873	German Protestant theologian	Critical and Exegetical Commentary on the New Testament	
Johann Tobias Beck	1804	1878	German theologian	Outlines of Biblical Psychology	Strong, Berkhof
Henry Alford	1810	1871	Anglican theologian and scholar	New Testament for English Readers	
Frederic Charles Cook	1810	1889	English churchman and linguist	The Speaker's Commentary	
Johann Gottfried Hausmann	1811	1901			
Gustav Friedrich Oehler	1812	1872	German Lutheran theologian	Theology of the Old Testament	Berkhof
Søren Kierkegaard	1813	1855	Danish Lutheran	The Concept of Anxiety, The Sickness Unto Death, Johannes Climacus, or De omnibus dubitandum est. A Narrative	
Franz Delitzsch	1813	1890	German Lutheran theologian	Biblical Psychology	Berkhof
William Smith	1813	1893	English Lexicographer	Smith's Bible Dictionary	
Theophan the Recluse	1815	1894	Russian Orthodox Theologian	The Spiritual Life	
Jan Jacob van Oosterzee	1817	1882	Dutch Divine	Christian Dogmatics	Strong
Charles John Ellicott	1819	1905	Anglican theologian	Destiny of the Creature	Strong
A. R. Fausset	1821	1910	Anglican theologian	Jamieson-Fausset-Brown Bible Commentary	
Karl August Auberlen	1824	1864	German Lutheran theologian	Geist des Menschen im Biblischen Sinne	Strong, Berkhof
George Boardman the Younger	1828	1903	Baptist	"The Scriptural Anthropology." Baptist Quarterly Vol. 1	Strong
Andrew Murray	1828	1917	Dutch Reformed Church	The Spirit of Christ	
John Bickford Heard	1828	?		The Tripartite Nature of Man	Strong, Berkhof
Henry Liddon	1829	1890	English Theologian		John Laidlaw
Hermann Cremer	1834	1903	German Protestant theologian	Biblico-theological Lexicon of New Testament Greek	Strong
C. I. Scofield	1843	1921	American Theologian	Scofield Reference Bible	
G. H. Pember	1837	1910	Plymouth Brethren	Earth's Earliest Ages	
Otto Stockmayer	1838	1917	German Holiness Movement		Watchman Nee in Spiritual Man
F. B. Meyer	1847	1929	English Baptist pastor and evangelist		Watchman Nee in Spiritual Man & Latent Power of the Soul
James M Stalker	1848	1929	Scottish preacher	Christian Psychology	
Clarence Larkin	1850	1924	Protestant (Baptist)	Dispensational Truth or God's Plan and Purpose in the Ages	
Jessie Penn-Lewis	1861	1927	Protestant (Welsh)	Soul and Spirit, War on the Saints	
Mary E. McDonough	1863	1962		God's Plan of Redemption	
Lewis Sperry Chafer	1871	1952	American Protestant Theologiian	Systematic Theology Vol. 1&2	Gordon R. Lewis and Bruce A. Demarest in Integrative Theology
George H. Lang	1874	1958	Plymouth Brethren	Firstfruits and Harvest	
Evan Roberts	1878	1951	Welsh Calvinist Methodist	War on The Saints	
Robert Lightfoot	1883	1953	Anglican Priest and Theologian		John Laidlaw
William Theodore Heard	1884	1973	Cardinal in the Roman Catholic Church		
Arthur W. Pink	1886	1952	Reformed	The Great Change, Regeneration, Or, The New Birth, Gleanings in Genesis	
Herbert Lockyer	1886	1984		All the Doctrines of the Bible	John Woodward
Theodore Austin-Sparks	1888	1971	British Christian evangelist	What is Man?	John Woodward
Ruth Paxson	1889	1949	Protestant	Life on the Highest Plane	
Watchman Nee	1903	1972	Chinese Christian Preacher	The Spiritual Man, The Release of the Spirit	
George S. Hendry	1904	1993	Reformed Theologian	The Holy Spirit in Christian Theology	
Witness Lee	1905	1997	Chinese Christian Preacher	The Economy of God	
E.C.Bragg	1912	1995	American Evangelical Theologian		
Lehman Strauss	?	1997	Baptist	Man A Trinity (Spirit, Soul, Body)	
Mark G Cambron	1911	2000		Bible Doctrines	John Woodward
Lester Sumrall	1913	1996	American Pentecostal pastor and evangelist	Spirit, Soul and Body	
S. Lewis Johnson Jr.	1915	2004	American Presbyterian Theologian	Man and his Nature, part 1	
Gleason Archer	1916	2004	American theologian	Encyclopedia of Bible Difficulties	
P. B. Fitzwater	?	?		Christian Theology A Systematic Presentation	John Woodward

A form of trichotomy is also held in Latter Day Saint theology. In the Doctrine and Covenants, a revelation of Joseph Smith Jr. states: "And the spirit and the body are the soul of man" (D&C 88:15).

== See also ==
- Bipartite (theology)
- Monism
- Soul dualism
