= Johann Christian Friedrich Steudel =

German Lutheran theologian (1779-1837)

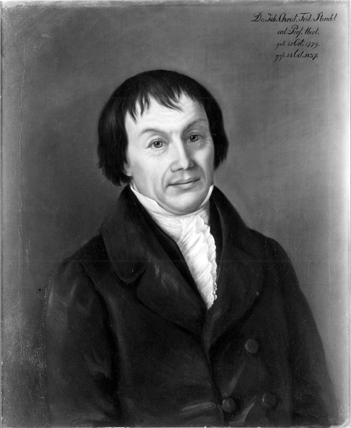
Johann Christian Friedrich Steudel

Johann Christian Friedrich Steudel (25 October 1779, in Esslingen am Neckar – 24 October 1837, in Tübingen) was a German Lutheran theologian. He was a brother of botanist Ernst Gottlieb von Steudel (1783–1856).

From 1797 he studied Protestant theology at the University of Tübingen. Beginning in 1803, he worked as a vicar in Oberesslingen, and two years later, became a tutor at Tübinger Stift. In 1808 he traveled to Paris, where he studied with Silvestre de Sacy and Carl Benedict Hase. Following his return to Germany, he served as a deacon in Cannstatt (from 1810) and Tübingen (from 1812). In 1815 he became an associate professor of theology at the University of Tübingen, where in 1822 he gained a full professorship. From 1826 onward, he was a professor of dogmatics and Old Testament theology at the university.

He was a proponent of rational supernaturalism, and was the last prominent member of the so-called "Old Tübingen School" of theology. During the latter part of his career, he spearheaded an attack on David Strauss's controversial book, Das Leben Jesu.

== Selected works ==
In 1828 he founded the journal Tübinger Zeitschrift für Theologie. The following are a few of Steudel's significant writings:

- Ueber die Haltbarkeit des Glaubens an geschichtliche, hohere Offenbarung Gottes, 1814 – On the durability of faith in an historical, higher revelation of God.
- Neuere Vorträge über Religion und Christenthum, 1825 – Newer lectures on religion and Christianity.
- Grundzüge einer Apologetik für das Christenthum, 1830 – Principles of apologetics for Christianity.
- Die Glaubenslehre der evangelisch-protestantischen Kirche, 1834 – The doctrine of the faith of the Evangelical-Protestant Church.

After his death, his lectures on Old Testament theology were published by Gustav Friedrich Oehler.
