= Roud, Isle of Wight =

Hamlet in the United Kingdom

Coordinates: 50°37′14″N 1°16′28″W

Roud on the Isle of Wight

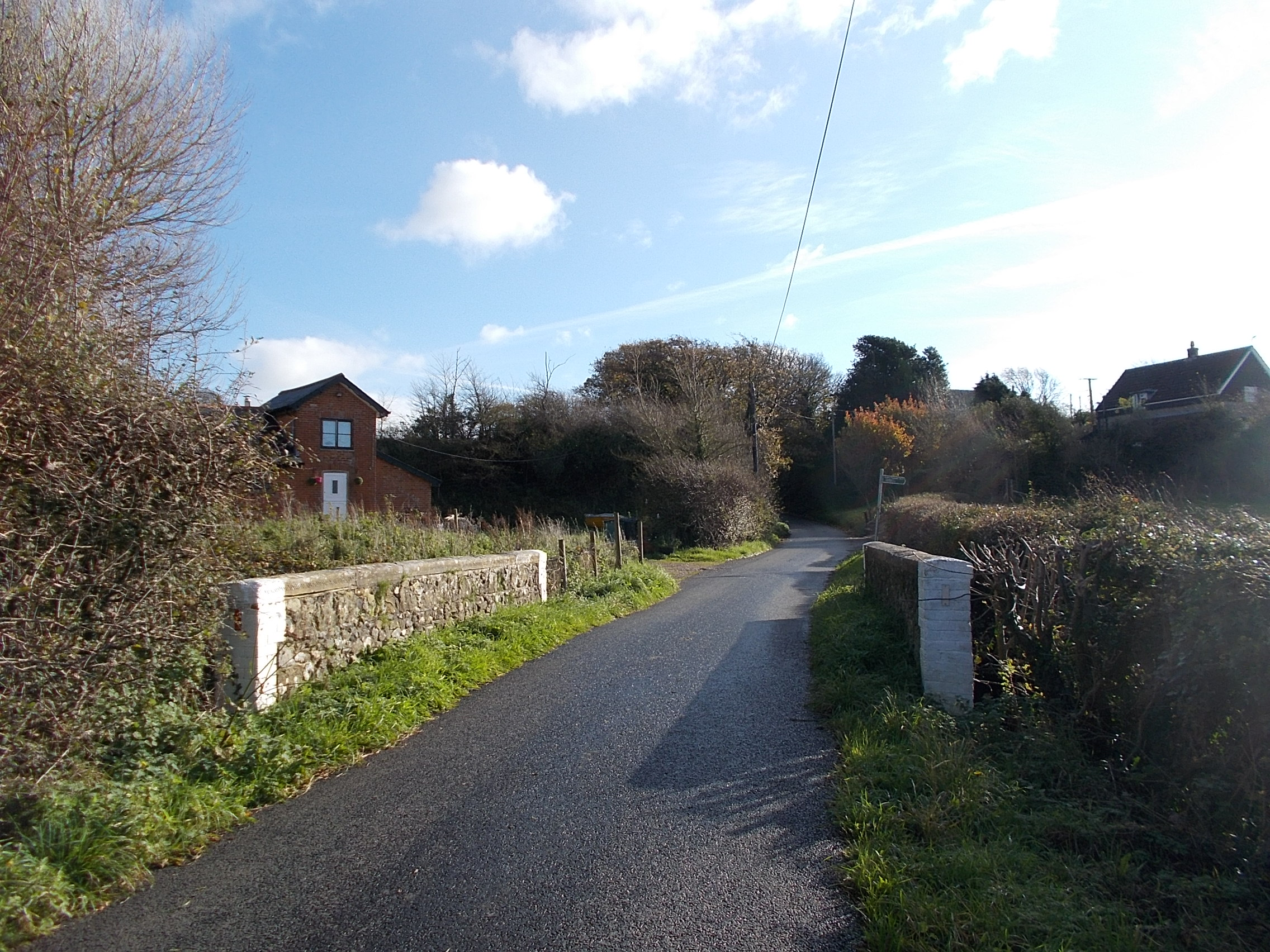
Roud. In the foreground is the bridge over the River Yar, here just a small stream.

Roud is a hamlet on the Isle of Wight in southern England. According to the Post Office the population of the hamlet as at the 2011 census was included in the civil parish of Godshill.

== Name ==
The name probably means '(the place at) the reed-bed', from Old English hrēod. The reed-bed is probably referring to the Eastern Yar, which runs through the hamlet. Rowde in Wiltshire has the same origin.

1086 (Domesday Book): Rode

1248: Rud

1287-1290: Roude

1428: Rowde

== History ==
Roud was part of a free manor owned by Alnod in the time of King Edward. In 1086, it was owned by Gozelin, son of Azor. There were a number of small estates that were part of Rode, including those of Azor, Sawin and Nigel. By the end of the 13th century it was owned by the Lisle family of Wootton.

In 1378, it was recorded as having 72 taxpayers. When Sir John Lisle died in 1523, it became part of the Wootton estate. Later, it was owned by both the Pike and Bonham families. In 1910, the Roud estate was sold to the Isle of Wight County Council by Mr. Arthur Atherley, and was broken up into smaller properties.
