= All Saints' Church, Godshill =

Church on the Isle of Wight, England

Coordinates: 50°38′01″N 01°15′20″W

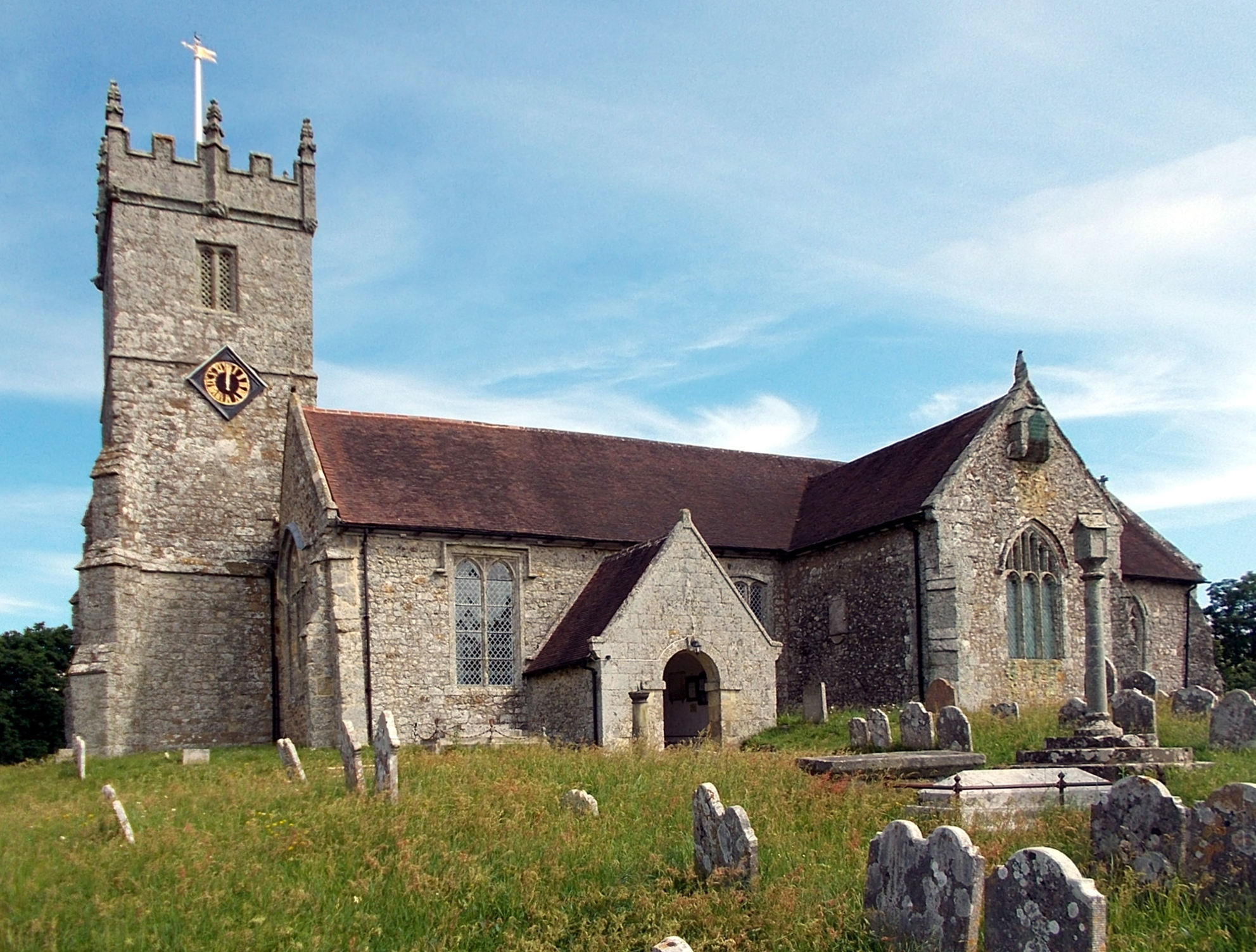
- All Saints' Church, Godshill
- Denomination: Church of England
- Churchmanship: Anglo Catholic

History
- Dedication: All Saints and St Lawrence

Administration
- Province: Canterbury
- Diocese: Portsmouth
- Parish: Godshill

Clergy
- Bishop: The Rt Revd Norman Banks (AEO)
- Vicar: In Vacancy.

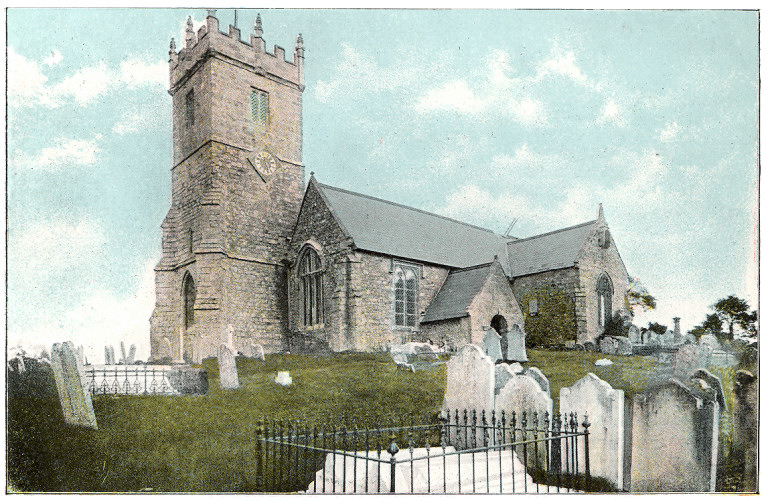
Colourised image of Godshill Church, circa 1910

All Saints' Church, Godshill is a parish church in the Church of England located in Godshill, Isle of Wight.

== History ==
According to legend, the original foundations for the church were laid in a flat, easily accessible site; each morning they were found transferred to the hill where the church exists today. Eventually the builders gave up building it in the planned flat location and built it on the hill.

The church is medieval. It is noted for its medieval wall painting of a Lily crucifix, one of only two in Europe. The Lily painting was whitewashed out to save it from destruction during the Reformation. It remained hidden until the 19th century, when it was rediscovered.

Godshill, dedicated to All Saints, "a spacious cruciform edifice, with a singular bell-turret on the south gable," consists of a chancel, nave, cross aisles, and tower. From its architecture it is obviously of ancient foundation, and a portion of the present edifice may have stood upon the sacred hill when Fitz-Osbert gave it to the Abbey of Lire. Most of the building, however, is Transitional Norman. Its wealth was very great, from the extent of the adjacent demesnes, and in 1404 it was assessed at 100 marks yearly. When King Edward VI's commissioners sold the church's plate, it realized not less than £54, 2s. 7d. The advowson was presented, in 1623, to Queen's College, Oxford, by King Charles I. The church still owns its Elizabethan era Chalice on loan to the Carisbrooke Castle Museum.

All Saints is in the Anglo-catholic tradition of the Church of England. As a Society Parish, All Saints and St. Albans (Upper Ventnor) are under the episcopal care of the Bishop Of Richborough, one of the special bishops provided by the Archbishops of Canterbury and York to give sacrament assurance and pastoral care to Parishes who have passed a resolution under the House of Bishops’ Declaration. The church is in vacancy at present and served by visiting priests, whilst awaiting authority to recruit for 2023.

The tower contains a ring of 6 bells which were all cast by Llewellin and James, and are the only ring of bells by this founder on the Island. The biggest weighs 8cwt.

The churchyard contains a Commonwealth war grave of a Royal Engineers soldier of World War I. Within the church is a memorial to Admiral of the Fleet Sir Dudley Pound, who died in World War II having been First Sea Lord of the Admiralty at its outbreak.

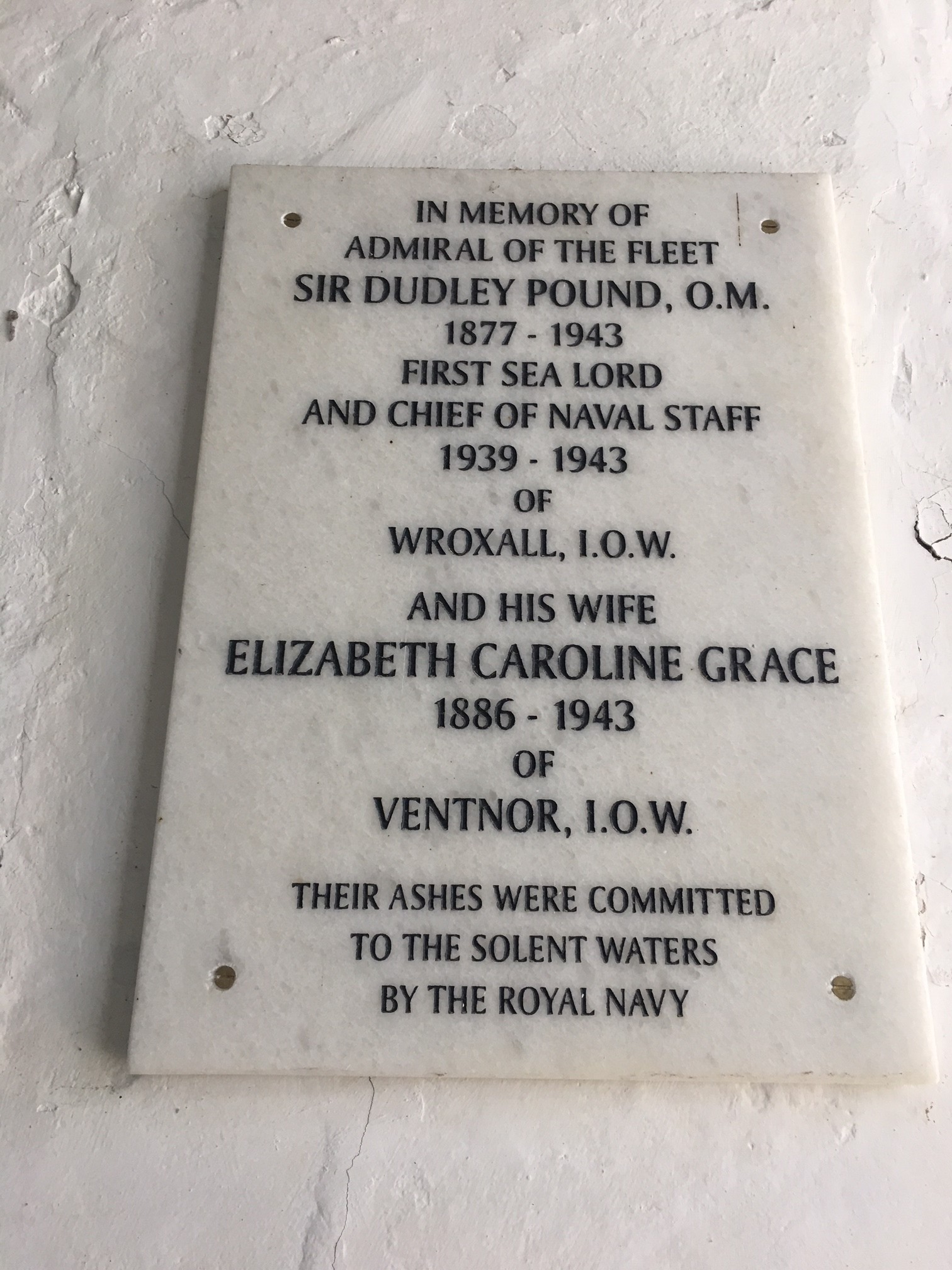
Dudley Pound memorial in All Saints' Church, Godshill

== Stained glass ==
The church has a stained-glass window by William Morris.

== Organ ==
A specification of the organ can be found on the National Pipe Organ Register.
