= Christian anthropology =

Study of the human (anthropos) as it relates to God

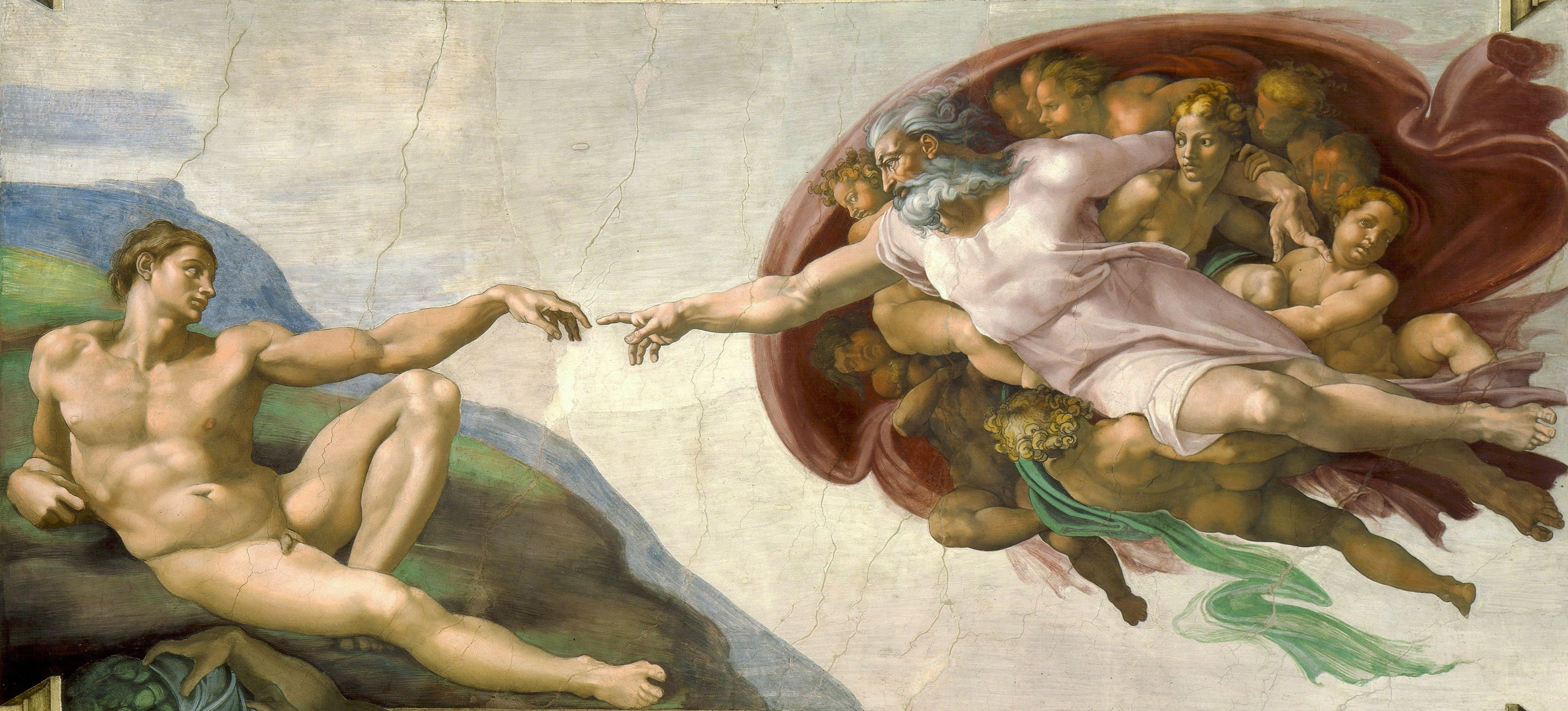
The Creation of Adam, as depicted by Michelangelo on the Sistine Chapel ceiling

In the context of Christian theology, Christian anthropology is the study of the human (anthropos) as it relates to God. It differs from the social science of anthropology, which primarily deals with the comparative study of the physical and social characteristics of humanity across times and places.

One aspect of Christian anthropology studies is the innate nature or constitution of the human, known as the nature of humankind. It is concerned with the relationship between notions such as body, soul and spirit which together form a person, based on their descriptions in the Bible. There are three traditional views of the human constitution: trichotomism, dichotomism and monism (in the sense of anthropology).

== Early Christian writers ==
=== Gregory of Nyssa ===
The reference source for Gregory's anthropology is his treatise De opificio hominis. His concept of man is founded on the ontological distinction between the created and uncreated. Man is a material creation and is thus limited, but infinite in that his immortal soul has an indefinite capacity to grow closer to the divine. Gregory believed that the soul is created simultaneous to the creation of the body (in opposition to Origen, who speculated on the soul's pre-existence) and that embryos were thus persons. To Gregory, the human being is exceptional being created in the image of God. Humanity is theomorphic both in having self-awareness and free will, the latter which gives each individual existential power, because to Gregory, in disregarding God one negates one's own existence. In his Song of Songs, Gregory metaphorically describes human lives as paintings created by apprentices to a master: the apprentices (the human wills) imitate their master's work (the life of Christ) with beautiful colors (virtues), and thus man strives to be a reflection of Christ. Gregory, in stark contrast to most thinkers of his age, saw great beauty in the Fall: from Adam's sin from two perfect humans would eventually arise myriad.

=== Augustine of Hippo ===
Augustine was one of the first Christian ancient Latin authors with very clear anthropological vision. He saw the human being as a perfect unity of two substances: soul and body. He was much closer in this anthropological view to Aristotle than to Plato. In his late treatise On Care to Be Had for the Dead sec. 5 (420 AD) he insists that the body pertains to the essence of the human person:

In no wise are the bodies themselves to be spurned. (...) For these pertain not to ornament or aid which is applied from without, but to the very nature of man.

Augustine's favourite figure to describe body-soul unity is marriage: caro tua, coniunx tua – your body is your wife. Initially, the two elements were in perfect harmony. After the fall of humanity they are now experiencing dramatic combat between one another. Body and soul are two categorically different things. The body is a three-dimensional object composed of the four elements, whereas the soul has no spatial dimensions. Soul is a kind of substance, participating in reason, fit for ruling the body. Augustine was not preoccupied—as Plato and Descartes were—with going too much into details in efforts to explain the metaphysics of the soul-body union. It sufficed for him to admit that they were metaphysically distinct. To be a human is to be a composite of soul and body, and the soul is superior to the body. The latter statement is grounded in his hierarchical classification of things into those that merely exist, those that exist and live, and those that exist, live, and have intelligence or reason.

According to N. Blasquez, Augustine's dualism of substances of the body and soul does not stop him from seeing the unity of body and soul as a substance itself. Following ancient philosophers he defined man as a rational mortal animal – animal rationale mortale.

== Terms or components ==
=== Body ===
The body (Greek σῶμα soma) is the corporeal or physical aspect of a human being. Christians have traditionally believed that the body will be resurrected at the end of the age.

Rudolf Bultmann states the following:

"That soma belongs inseparably, constitutively, to human existence is most clearly evident from the fact that Paul cannot conceive even of a future human existence after death, `when that which is perfect is come' as an existence without soma – in contrast to the view of those in Corinth who deny the resurrection (1 Cor. 15, especially vv. 35ff.)."
"Man does not have a soma; he is a soma"

=== Soul ===
The semantic domain of biblical soul is based on the Hebrew word nephesh, which presumably means "breath" or "breathing being". This word never means an immortal soul or an incorporeal part of the human being that can survive death of the body as the spirit of dead. This word usually designates the person as a whole or its physical life. In the Septuagint nephesh is mostly translated as psyche (ψυχή) and, exceptionally, in the Book of Joshua as empneon (ἔνμπεον), that is "breathing being". The Septuagint follows the terminology of the New Testament which uses the word psyche in a manner performatively similar to that of the Hebrew semantic domain, that is, as an invisible power (or ever more, for Platonists, immortal and immaterial) that gives life and motion to the body and is responsible for its attributes.

In Patristic thought, towards the end of the 2nd century psyche was understood in more a Greek than a Hebrew way, and it was contrasted with the body. In the 3rd century, with the influence of Origen, there was the establishing of the doctrine of the inherent immortality of the soul and its divine nature. Origen also taught the transmigration of the souls and their preexistence, but these views were officially rejected in 553 in the Fifth Ecumenical Council. Inherent immortality of the soul was accepted among western and eastern theologians throughout the Middle Ages and after the Reformation, as evidenced by the Westminster Confession.

On the other hand, some modern Protestant scholars have adopted views similar to conditional immortality, including Edward Fudge and Clark Pinnock. In the last six decades, conditional immortality—or better "immortality by grace" (κατὰ χάριν ἀθανασία, kata charin athanasia)—of the soul has been widely accepted among Eastern Orthodox theologians by returning to the views of the late 2nd century, where immortality was still considered as a gift granted with the value of Jesus' death and resurrection. The Seventh-day Adventist Church has held to conditional immortality since the mid-19th century.

=== Spirit ===
The spirit (Hebrew ruach, Greek πνεῦμα, pneuma, which can also mean "breath") is likewise an immaterial component. It is often used interchangeably with "soul", psyche, although trichotomists believe that the spirit is distinct from the soul. Bultmann states:

When Paul speaks of the pneuma of man he does not mean some higher principle within him or some special intellectual or spiritual faculty of his, but simply his self, and the only questions is whether the self is regarded in some particular aspect when it is called pneuma. In the first place, it apparently is regarded in the same way as when it is called psyche – viz. as the self that lives in man's attitude, in the orientation of his will.

Charles Taylor has argued in Sources of the Self: Making of Modern Identity that the attempt to reduce spirit or soul to the "self" is an anachronistic project claiming historical precedence, when in reality it is a modern, Western, secular reading of the Scriptures.

== Constitution or nature of the person ==
Christian theologians have historically differed over the issue of how many distinct components constitute the human being.

=== Two parts (Dichotomism) ===
The most popular view is that the human being is formed of two components: material (body/flesh) and spiritual (soul/spirit). The soul or spirit departs from the body at death and will be reunited with the body at the resurrection.

=== Three parts (Trichotomism) ===
Some theologians hold that human beings are made up of three distinct components: body (flesh), soul, and spirit. This is known technically as trichotomism. The biblical texts typically used to support this position are 1 Thessalonians 5:23 and Hebrews 4:12.

This position holds that within the person of Jesus Christ existed three parts: a Body, a rational Soul, and the Holy Spirit (whom he received in the Baptism of Jesus).

=== One part (Monism) ===
Modern theologians increasingly hold to the view that the human being is an indissoluble unity. This is known as holism or monism. The body and soul are not considered separate components of a person but rather as two facets of a united whole. It is argued that this more accurately represents Hebrew thought, whereas body-soul dualism is more characteristic of classical Greek Platonist and Cartesian thought. Monism is the official position of the Seventh-day Adventist Church, which adheres to the doctrine of "soul sleep". Monism also appears to be more consistent with certain physicalist interpretations of modern neuroscience, which has indicated that the so-called "higher functions" of the mind are dependent upon or emergent from brain structure, not the independent workings of an immaterial soul as was previously thought.

An influential exponent of this view was liberal theologian Rudolf Bultmann. Oscar Cullmann was influential in popularizing it.

== Origin of humanity ==
The Bible teaches in the book of Genesis that humans were created by God. Some Christians believe that this must have involved a miraculous creative act, while others are comfortable with the idea that God worked through the evolutionary process. Genesis also teaches that human beings, male and female, were created in the image of God. The exact meaning of this has been the subject of theological debate throughout church history.

There are two opposing views about how the soul originates in each human being. Creationism teaches that God creates a "fresh" soul within each human embryo at or some time shortly after conception. This is not to be confused with creationism as a view of the origins of life and the universe. Traducianism, by contrast, teaches that the soul is inherited from the individual's parents, along with his or her biological material.

== Human nature ==
Most Christian theology traditionally teaches that human nature originates holy but is corrupted by the Fall. Part of the development of church doctrine has historically been concerned with discerning what role the human plays in "redemption" from that fall.

The debate about human nature between Augustine and Pelagius had to do with the nature of sin and its relation to the state of the human. Pelagius believed that man's nature was inherently good and taught that all children are born "as a fresh creation of God and therefore good." For Pelagius freedom is a constitute part of human nature. Humanity's capacity to choose is inherited and therefore is untainted. Human are capable of following divine laws (such as the Ten Commandments) and live morally. The inherited ability to choose is itself a grace of creation. Augustine believed that all humans are born into sin because each has inherited a sinful nature through Adam's original sin. Without grace from God, humanity is incapable of choosing good and therefore of pursuing God. Salvation then becomes either a cooperation between human will and divine grace (synergism) or an act of divine will apart from human agency (monergism). Pelagius's position was condemned at the Council of Carthage (418), the Council of Ephesus, and the Second Council of Orange. However the councils did soften Augustine's position on predestination.

During the Reformation, monergism had a resurgence through John Calvin's devolvement of the doctrine of total depravity. Within Protestant circles a debate happened between followers of John Calvin (Calvinists or Reformed tradition) and followers of Jacobus Arminius (Arminians) on the nature of grace in the process of salvation. Calvinists and Arminians follow Augustine in the doctrine of total depravity. However, Arminians hold that God restores humanity's free will concerning the ability to choose salvation whereas classic Calvinism holds to a strict monergism.

Synergism and its affirmation of the participation of human will in salvation is the classic Patristic position as well as the position of the Roman Catholic, Eastern Orthodox Church, and many Arminian influenced Protestant Churches. Monergism has become the position of most churches that are a part of the Reformed tradition.

== Death and afterlife ==
Christian anthropology has implications for beliefs about death and the afterlife. The Christian church has traditionally taught that the soul of each individual separates from the body at death, to be reunited at the resurrection. This is closely related to the doctrine of the immortality of the soul. For example, the Westminster Confession of Faith (chapter XXXII) states:

"The bodies of men, after death, return to dust, and see corruption: but their souls, which neither die nor sleep, having an immortal subsistence, immediately return to God who gave them"

=== Intermediate state ===
The question then arises: where exactly does the disembodied soul "go" at death? Theologians refer to this subject as the intermediate state. The Old Testament speaks of a place called sheol where the spirits of the dead reside. In the New Testament, hades, the classical Greek realm of the dead, takes the place of sheol. In particular, Jesus teaches in Luke 16:19–31 (Lazarus and Dives) that hades consists of two separate "sections", one for the righteous and one for the unrighteous. His teaching is consistent with intertestamental Jewish thought on the subject.

Fully developed Christian theology goes a step further; on the basis of such texts as Luke 23:43 and Philippians 1:23, it has traditionally been taught that the souls of the dead are received immediately either into heaven or hell, where they will experience a foretaste of their eternal destiny prior to the resurrection. (Roman Catholicism teaches a third possible location, Purgatory, though this is denied by Protestants and Eastern Orthodoxy.)

"the souls of the righteous, being then made perfect in holiness, are received into the highest heavens, where they behold the face of God, in light and glory, waiting for the full redemption of their bodies. And the souls of the wicked are cast into hell, where they remain in torments and utter darkness, reserved to the judgment of the great day." (Westminster Confession)

Some Christian groups that stress a monistic anthropology deny that the soul can exist consciously apart from the body. For example, the Seventh-day Adventist Church teaches that the intermediate state is an unconscious sleep; this teaching is informally known as "soul sleep".

=== Final state ===
In Christian belief, both the righteous and the unrighteous will be resurrected at the Last Judgment. The righteous will receive incorruptible, immortal bodies (1 Corinthians 15), while the unrighteous will be sent to the "Lake of Fire" or "Gehenna". Traditionally, Christians have believed that hell will be a place of eternal physical and psychological punishment. In the last two centuries, annihilationism and universalism have become more popular.

== See also ==
- Human nature
- Person
- Philosophical anthropology
- List of important publications in anthropology
- Christian psychology

== Bibliography ==
- Agaësse, Paul, SJ (2004). L'anthropologie chrétienne selon saint Augustin : image, liberté, péché et grâce. Paris: Médiasèvres. p. 197. ISBN 2-900388-68-6.
- Blasquez, N, El concepto de substantia segun san Agustin, ""Augustinus" 14 (1969), pp. 305–350; 15 (1970), pp. 369–383; 16 (1971), pp. 69–79.
- Bainvel, J. "Ame. Doctrine des trois premiers siècles; Développement de la doctrine du IVe au XIIIe s.". Dictionnaire de Théologie Catholique. Vol. 1. pp. 977–1006.
- Bultmann, Rudolf (1953). Theologie des Neuen Testaments (in German). Tübingen: Mohr. pp. 189–249. (English translation Theology of the New Testament 2 vols, London: SCM, 1952, 1955). The leading scholarly reference supporting a holistic anthropology
- Cullmann, Oscar. Immortality of the soul or resurrection of the dead?: the witness of the New Testament. Archived from the original on 2009-10-26.
- Gilson, Étienne, Gregory of Nyssa, Anthropology, in: History of Christian Philosophy in the Middle Ages, (1980 reprinted 1985), London: Sheed & Ward, pp. 56–59, ISBN 0-7220-4114-4.
- Couturier, Charles, SJ, La structure métaphysique de l'homme d'après saint Augustin, in: Augustinus Magister. Congrès International Augustinien. Communications, (1954), Paris, vol. 1, pp. 543–550
- Hendrics, E. Platonisches und Biblisches Denken bei Augustinus, in: 'Augustinus Magister. Congrès International Augustinien. Communications, (1954), Paris, vol. 1.
- Jewitt, R. (1971). Paul's Anthropological Terms. Leiden: Brill.
- Kümmel, W. G. (1948). Das Bild des Menschen im Neuen Testament (in German). Zürich: Zwingli. (English translation Man in the NT. London: Epworth, 1963)
- Ladd, George Eldon (1974). A Theology of the New Testament. Grand Rapids, MI: Eerdmans. pp. 457–78. ISBN 978-0-8028-3443-0.
- Karpp, Heinrich (1950). Probleme altchristlicher Anthropologie. Biblische Anthropologie und philosophische Psychologie bei den Kirchen-vatern des dritten Jahrhunderts. Gütersloh: G. Bertelsmann Verlag.
- Mann, W. E., Inner-Life Ethics, in:Matthews, G. B., ed. (1999). The Augustinian Tradition. Philosophical Traditions. Berkeley-Los Angeles-London: University of California Press. pp. 138–152. ISBN 0-520-20999-0.
- Masutti, Egidio, Il problema del corpo in San Agostino, Roma: Borla, 1989, p. 230, ISBN 88-263-0701-6
- Rondeau, Marie Josèphe (1962). "Remarques sur l'anthropologie de saint Hilaire". Studia Patristica. 6 (Papers presented to the Third International Conference on Patristic Studies held at Christ Church, Oxford, 1959, Part IV Theologica, Augustiniana, ed. F. L. Cross). Berlin: Akademie-Verlag: 197–210.
- Steenberg, M. C. (2009). Of God and Man : theology as anthropology from Irenaeus to Athanasius. London: T & T Clark.
