= Gustav Friedrich Oehler =

German theologian (1812–1872)

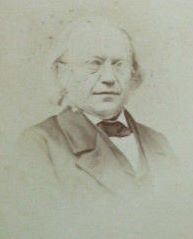
Gustav Friedrich Oehler, 1871

Gustav Friedrich Oehler (10 June 1812 – 19 February 1872) was a German theologian.

== Biography ==
He was born in Ebingen, Württemberg, and was educated privately and at the University of Tübingen where he was much influenced by J. C. F. Steudel, professor of Old Testament theology. In 1837, after a term of Oriental study at Berlin, he went to Tübingen as tutor (German: Repetent), becoming in 1840, a professor at the seminary and pastor in Schönthal.

In 1845, he published his Prolegomena zur Theologie des Alten Testaments, accepted an invitation to Breslau and received the degree of doctor from the University of Bonn. In 1852, he returned to Tübingen as the director of the seminary and professor of Old Testament theology at the university. He declined a call to Erlangen as successor to Franz Delitzsch, and died at Tübingen in 1872.

== Theology ==
Oehler was one of the foremost Old Testament scholars of his time of the conservative school. He admitted the composite authorship of the Pentateuch and the Book of Isaiah, and did much to counteract the antipathy against the Old Testament that had been fostered by Schleiermacher. In church polity, he was Lutheran rather than Reformed. He opposed the union of the Lutheran and Reformed churches, and while declaring in favor of confessional Lutheranism, he held aloof from the old Lutheran party.

== Works ==
Besides his Old Testament Theology (2 vols., 1873–74; English trans., Edinburgh, 1874–75; New York, 1883, Dutch translation by dr. J. Hartog, 1879), his works were Gesammelte Seminarreden (1872) and Lehrbuch der Symbolik (Manual of symbolism; 1876, edited by Johann Delitzsch), both published posthumously, and about forty articles for the first edition of Herzog's Realencyklopädie, which were largely retained in the second edition.
