= Robert Govett =

British theologian and independent pastor

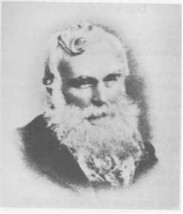
Robert Govett (1813–1901)

Robert Govett (14 February 1813 in Staines, Middlesex – 20 February 1901 in Norwich, Norfolk) was a British theologian and independent pastor of Surrey Chapel, Norwich.

Govett wrote many books and brochures. His best known work is The Apocalypse: Expounded by Scripture (1861–65), which he wrote under a pen name. Wilbur M. Smith said about it: "One of the profoundest expositions of the book of Revelation that I know of is the work of Robert Govett. My own opinion is that he brings to his interpretation a more thorough knowledge of the Scriptures in their bearing on the last book of the Bible than any other writer of his generation."

== Early life and education ==
He was the eldest son of Robert Govett senior, vicar of Staines in Surrey (died in 1858), and his wife Sarah Romaine, of whose eight sons five were ordained in the Church of England. William Romaine (1714–1795) the evangelical was Sarah's grandfather, and Robert senior took on Romaine as a surname in 1827. Thomas Romaine Govett, John Clement Govett, Henry Govett and Decimus Storry Govett were his clerical brothers: William Govett Romaine, father of Gabrielle Enthoven, was another brother, and in the family of 11 he had three sisters.

Govett matriculated at Worcester College, Oxford on 20 October 1830, aged 17. He graduated BA in 1834, and received his MA in 1837. He became a Fellow of Worcester in 1835, holding the position until 1844. In 1836 he was ordained deacon in the Church of England, and in 1837 he was ordained priest.

== Ministry and doctrine ==
Govett started his first curacy in Bexley, Kent. His second curacy was St Stephen's Church, Norwich (1841). It has been suggested that his move to Norwich was mediated by connections with the local Bignold family: for example his evangelical friend Edward Bickersteth had married into the Bignolds, as had his brother Thomas Romaine Govett.

The members of his church loved the way he preached (vigorously and clearly), and many of the elite in Norwich and its surroundings were attracted to his congregation. Govett was known for his analytical powers. As Dr. Cyril J. Barber (The Minister's Library) put it: "Few men could equal Govett for originality of thought. He also possessed a well-ordered, disciplined mind. He could trace a theme through Scripture with unerring logic."

By 1843, in Norwich, Govett was having serious doubts about Anglican doctrine. He revealed some of those in correspondence with Bickersteth; who recommended Richard Hooker on issues related to Anglican church polity. When Govett seemed to be favouring premillenarian views, Bickersteth felt he had to make a reproach.

Having witnessed an immersion baptism at St Mary's Baptist Chapel, Govett became convinced of the Scriptural integrity of full immersion baptism and of the error of infant baptism. A few days later he himself was baptized at St Mary's by William Brock. In 1844 his licence as curate of St Stephen's was revoked by the Bishop of Norwich, when Govett informed him that he could no longer conduct with a clear conscience the service of infant baptism.

It was not until 1878 that Govett formally left the Church of England, but he did not immediately know how he would sustain himself. His family was not at all happy with his decision, and he was also ostracized by many who held to the more traditional teachings of the Church of England. But he was willing to pay the cost.

Govett then started an independent work, known as "Bazaar Chapel", at the Victoria Rooms in Norwich, where he ministered to a growing number of people. He was influenced by the Plymouth Brethren, and liked the writings of John Nelson Darby and other Brethren, but he remained the sole leader of the church, and kept his independent attitude towards Scripture exegesis.

== Later year and legacy ==
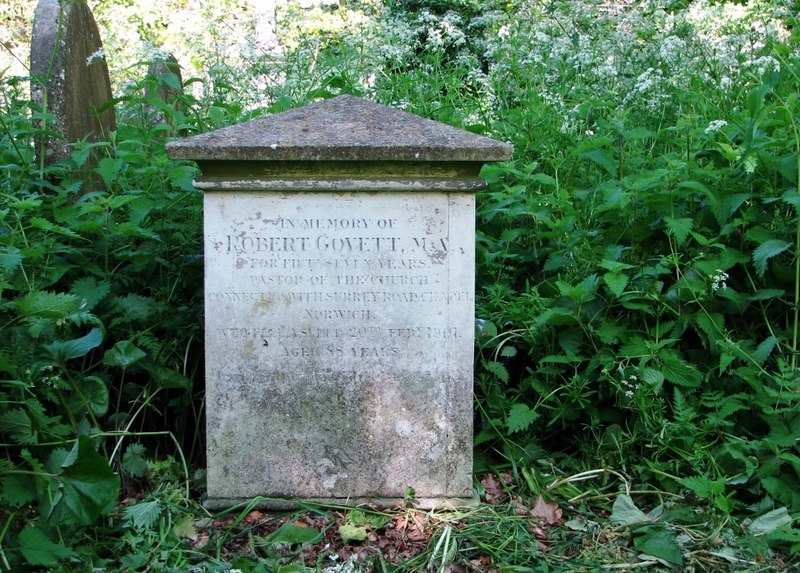
Grave Robert Govett MA at Rosary Cemetery, Norwich

In 1854 Govett opened Surrey Chapel, Norwich, which had room for 1500 people. He stayed on as pastor until his death on 20 February 1901. When he died the church had about 200 members. He was unmarried.

David Morrieson Panton was his successor. Well-known members of his congregation were Evan Hopkins and Margaret Barber. Welsh evangelist Jessie Penn-Lewis — co-worker of Welsh Revivalist Evan Roberts — knew Robert Govett too. Margaret Barber became known as the spiritual mentor of Watchman Nee.

== Teaching ==
Govett wrote many tracts on baptism and these were much approved by Charles Haddon Spurgeon, who was also appreciative of other materials that Govett published. Spurgeon once said about Govett: "Mr. Govett wrote a hundred years before his time, and the day will come when his works will be treasured as sifted gold." Govett became increasingly taken up with eschatology, and he was of the opinion that before the Great Tribulation there would be a selective or partial rapture, and that only the raptured saints (the firstfruits) are worthy to reign with Christ during the Millennium. He seems to have been one of the first, if not the first, to present a clear view of the judgment seat of Christ and its purpose in relation to the Millennial Kingdom. Thus, it is a point of emphasis throughout most of his writings. Through Scripture, he clearly delineates between eternal life, the free gift that God gives to those who accept the payment His Son made, and the prize, the reward of the Millennial Reign, which one can attain to by producing the good works or fruits that emanate from a walk of faith. The latter of the two is held out to all the saints by the Almighty, but it is only given to those who have submitted to the work of the Holy Spirit toward personal sanctification.

There are two characteristics within his writings that are predominant: One was his ability to take the multi-facets of the types, shadows, and symbols of the Word and overlay them so as to compare them against each other – an approach he used to confirm whether his understanding of them was in line with the reasons and purpose God had given them. For instance, if the underlying symbolism conflicted with what appeared to be the literal meaning of a portion of Scripture, he would set about to resolve the conflict. Thus, his writings are rich in the types and shadows of the Old Testament, which he felt must be learned if one is to expect a proper understanding of their fulfillment in the New Testament. The other, is the ability he developed to enter into the prophetic sense of the Word.

There is an early letter to Govett from Spurgeon, in which Spurgeon writes from Clapham on 20 October 1860, and requests some of Govett's tracts on baptism, "to disseminate a great truth which is far too much kept in the background". On the bottom corner of his letter is a note that reads: "I am informed that you wisely eschew the Title of Rev. - hence my addressing you as Mr." There are further letters from Spurgeon, the last dating from 1886.

== List of selected writings ==
- Calvinism by Calvin, being the substance of discourses delivered by Calvin and the other ministers of Geneva on the Doctrines of Grace. With an introductory essay by the Rev. R. Govett, Fellow of Worcester College, Oxford, and Assistant Curate of Somers Town, St. Pancras (1840) Public Domain
- Isaiah unfulfilled, being an exposition of the prophet, with new version and notes. To which are added two dissertations, one on the 'Sons of God' and 'Giants' of Genesis VI, and the other a comparative estimate of the Hebrew and Greek texts (1841) Public Domain
- The Prophecy on Olivet or Matthew 24–25 Expounded (1846)
- The Saints' Rapture to the Presence of the Lord Jesus (1852)
- Entrance into the Kingdom or Reward according to Works (1853) Second series (1855) Public Domain
- The Jews, the Gentiles, and the Church of God in the Gospel of Matthew (1869) Public Domain
- Eternal suffering of the wicked and Hades (1871) Public Domain
- How to Interpret the Apocalypse (1879) Public Domain
- The Apocalypse: Expounded by Scripture (1861–65)
- English derived from Hebrew (1868) Public Domain
- The Kingdom of God Future (1870)
- The Bride's Bath (1876)
- Christ's Resurrection and Ours - or I Corinthians IV Expounded (1876) Public Domain
- Moses or Christ? Being the Argument of the Epistle to the Galatians (1879)
- Tracts on the Kingdom (1880)
- Exposition of the Gospel of St John (1881)
- Christ superior to Angels, Moses and Aaron: A Comment on the Epistle to the Hebrews (1884)
- The New Jerusalem Our Eternal Home (1884)
- The Three Eatings (1888)
- What is the Church? The Argument of Ephesians (1889)
- The Sermon on the Mount Expounded (1934)
- The Twofoldness of Divine Truth (undated)
