= David Morrieson Panton =

David Morrieson Panton (D. M. Panton) (9 April 1870 – 20 May 1955) was the pastor of Surrey Chapel, Norwich, England, where he succeeded Robert Govett. He was the editor (1924–55) of The Dawn Magazine, a writer of books and numerous tracts, and a British leader among those pursuing Prophetic studies.

== Early days ==
Panton was born in Jamaica in 1870. There, his father was the first Archdeacon and a missionary of the Church of England. An uncle had been the Archbishop of the West Indies. Panton came to England in 1885 and was educated at the Old Hall School, Wellington, for two years, then at St Lawrence College, Ramsgate, where he spent another two years. He attended Caius College, Cambridge, where he studied law with a view to becoming a barrister. In his college days, Panton was influenced by one of his tutors, Labarestier, who came from Jersey. It was from him Panton first heard of the doctrines of the coming Kingdom and the Glory of Christ, during the last thousand years of earth's existence (The Millennium). Panton, also, came to accept the view there were conditions, which disciples had to fulfil in order to share this special reign ("Selective Rapture"). The immediate consequence was Panton's acceptance of baptism by total immersion, which caused him to leave the Church of England and become an "undenominational" Christian. Panton remained unaffiliated for most of his life, though later he did bring his Church into membership of the Fellowship of Independent Evangelical Churches.

== Pastor of Surrey Chapel, Norwich ==
In 1901, Panton was called to take up the pastoral duties at Surrey Chapel, Norwich, succeeding Robert Govett, who had died in February that year and whose teaching he had come to accept from his days at Cambridge. Panton had become acquainted with the Church through doing seven months duties as an assistant to Govett in the 1890s. Panton came to have a close bond with his congregation, in the same way his predecessor had. Panton had a gracious and dignified personality, but also sought to bring all matters of doctrine to the plain exposition of Scripture. Like his predecessor he took a "literalistic" view of Scripture – particularly in eschatology.

During his 24 years of full-time ministry at Surrey Chapel, Norwich, he saw the congregation built up. The Church maintained its Evangelical convictions and Panton saw many conversions, which were followed by baptism and Church membership. In particular Panton's time saw the Sunday School built up to reach a peak of over 600 scholars and 60 teachers and officers. There were also several who volunteered for missionary service, including one worker in China (Margaret E. Barber) who was influential in the nurturing of Watchman Nee.

== Work as editor ==
Panton founded and edited a new bi-monthly magazine, The Dawn, an Evangelical Magazine, which first appeared on 15 April 1924. His aim for his magazine was the stimulus, encouragement, and instruction of Christians who believed without reservation in all the Scriptures, and who sought to devote their lives to the highest ends before the return of Christ and the Kingdom. His editorial policy was to keep The Dawn as a fundamental, evangelistic, missionary, prophetic, dispensational, devotional magazine. This new responsibility heavily taxed the delicate constitution of Panton's health and brought inevitable changes, he retired from full-time ministry at Surrey Chapel, but he agreed to preach for one Sunday in each month. He continued to live within reach of the Church and so was always accessible. He maintained his output of writing the magazine's main article, which was often recycled as a separate tract. Quite often, the monthly sermon was taken down in shorthand by a member of his congregation, and appeared as one of the articles in a later edition of the monthly magazine.

== His last years ==
From 1941, Panton resigned completely from Surrey Chapel. As he aged, he felt the mode of the country and the times changed, so there was a reduction in readers of The Dawn. Paternoster took over from Charles Thynne as the publishers for the magazine. Panton died on 20 May 1955; he had prepared the final issue of his magazine, which ceased after his death.

== Publications ==
The volumes of The Dawn Magazine from 1924 to 1955 contain at least a leading article by Panton – and often more. As well as his own books, tracts and articles, Panton used his magazine to continue to popularise the writings of Robert Govett.

Panton's own writings included:

- The Christian Home: Its Sanctity and Joy. Charles J. Thynne & Jarvis Ltd, London, May 1924.
- Satanic Counterfeits of the Second Advent. Charles J. Thynne & Jarvis Ltd, London, Jan 1925 [Second Edition Revised and Enlarged]).

Present-Day Pamphlets [Series]: (All published by Charles J. Thynne & Jarvis Ltd, London)

- Spiritualism: Its Origin and Character. ("Contemporary spiritism studied in the light of the occult in Scripture").
- The Medium and the Witch. (The roots of spiritualism laid bare in world-old and worldwide phenomena).
- Irvingism and the Gifts of the Holy Ghost. ("The most plausible of all modern 'tongues' movements examined in the light of a legitimate desire for the supernatural").
- The Advance of Rome. ("A black thunder-cloud revealed on the horizon of the Church of Christ").
- Democracy, Socialism, and the Sermon on the Mount. ("Christian ethics in relation to Socialism and Democracy").
- Gnosticism: The Coming Apostasy (1910, Alfred Holness, London & R L Allan & Son, Glasgow: 2nd Edition, August 1925, Chas J Thynne & Jarvis Ltd, London). ("A study of the occult signs and doctrinal foundations of the Great Apostasy").
- The Judgment Seat of Christ. ("The responsibility of believers as a supplementary truth to their eternal security in Christ").

'A Rejoinder on The Judgment Seat of Christ' (A J Tilney, Norwich, 1912 [Private Run]).

- Christ Risen a Fact. ("The fact of the Resurrection the rock-foundation of the Faith").
- Expiation by Blood. ("Atonement traced and studied as the blood-red heart of the whole Bible").
- Rapture [Second edition 1924]. ("A problem as urgent and as practical as any that confronts the child of God").
- The Godhead of Jesus. ("Modernism answered by the Scriptures themselves").

Present-day Papers (or Addresses) [Series]:

- God's Oil and our Vessels: An Exposition.
- Bread for God's People: A Truth for the Times.
- The Prayer Battle: God's Arrow of salvation.
- On Verbal Inspiration: 'Or One Jot or One Tittle' (Alfred Holness, London, before 1910.
- Watchman, What of the Night?
- An Outline of the Apocalypse.
- The Last Hour of Foreign Missions.
- The Letters to the Seven Churches.
- Marriage and the Woman Movement.
- Sin after Conversion.
- Our Seat of Authority.
- A Federated Church.
- The First resurrection.
- Earth's Last Pentecost.
- Evolution and the Fall.
- The Disciple and the state.
- Maranatha (Poems).

Perils of the Age, First Series:

- Millennial Dawnism.
- Christian Science.
- Church Amusements.
- The Growth of Rome.
- Modernism.
- Spiritualism.
- Test for the Supernatural.
- The Seed, The Ox, and the Garment.
- The Order of the Star in the East.
- God's Terms of Communion.
- The Secrets of the Great War.
- Universalism.
- Spiritualism Inside the Churches.
- Earthquakes.

Studies in the Types:

- The Robes of the High Priest.
- The Scarlet Bird.

'Trusting and Toiling' Reprints:

- The Springing Fig Tree.
- The Re-engrafted Olive.
- Babylon and the Jew.
- The Uplifted Veil.
- Israel and Islam.
- The Rebuilding of the Temple.
- Democracy and the End.
- The Empire of Antichrist.
- Universal War.

Present-Day Leaflets:

- Christ and the Critics.
- The Virgin Birth.
- Baptism according to God.
- The Prize of our Calling.
- Counsels for Young Workers.
- Prayer.
- Rapture and Soul Winning.

== See also ==
- Jessie Penn-Lewis
- G. H. Pember
- John Nelson Darby
- Plymouth Brethren
