= Jessie Penn-Lewis =

Welsh preacher and writer (1861–1927)

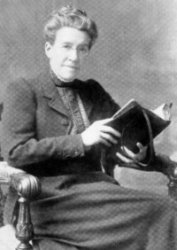
- Born: Jessie Jones; 28 February 1861; Neath, Wales
- Died: 15 August 1927 (aged 66); London, England
- Occupations: Evangelist and writer
- Spouse: William Penn-Lewis

Jessie Penn-Lewis (28 February 1861 – 15 August 1927, née Jones) was a Welsh evangelical speaker, who wrote several Christian evangelical works. Her religious work took her to Russia, Scandinavia, Canada, the United States and India.

== Early life ==
Penn-Lewis was born on 28 February 1861 under the name Jessie Jones in Neath, South Wales, as the first child of Heziah and Elias Jones. Her father was a civil engineer; her family was religious. Her mother was a worker for the temperance movement. Her grandfather was a Calvinistic Methodist minister, and her family background rooted in the Calvinistic Methodist tradition.

When young, Jessie was said to be sickly and have an "over active brain", so that she was kept from school until she was twelve. At a young age, Jessie Jones became the leader of a Junior Lodge of the temperance movement. She was married on 15 September 1880, at the age of 19, to William Penn-Lewis, an auditor's clerk for the Sussex County Council. Her husband was reportedly a descendant of William Penn.

They moved to Richmond, Surrey, where she attended Holy Trinity Church and helped to establish a Richmond branch of the YWCA. She was an admirer of Henrietta Soltau, a YWCA activist who supported the China Inland Mission.

While at Richmond, Penn-Lewis was influenced by the teaching of Evan H. Hopkins, the vicar of the Holy Trinity Church. Hopkins was an intellectual of the Keswick movement. For years, Penn-Lewis was preoccupied with her ministry with YWCA. Yet felt "spiritually dissatisfied". She sought answers to a number of religious questions through studying books on the subject. Among the books which influenced her thinking were Spirit of Christ by Andrew Murray and Spiritual Torrents (1682) by Jeanne Guyon.

== Public speaker ==
In 1892, Penn-Lewis had a sense of epiphany while studying Romans 6. She had previously thought that the Baptism with the Holy Spirit was the primary goal of the Christian life, but she now viewed this as only the beginning of the Christian's path. In her view, the Christian believer should pursue a fellowship with the Cross of Calvary. Her new goal was (in her words) to reach "through the death of the Cross, into union with the Ascended Lord in the bosom of the Father".

From 1892 to c. 1896, Penn-Lewis experienced success as a public speaker. In this period, the annual attendance of the YWCA classes increased considerably. About 6,900 people attended the classes in 1892, while almost 13,000 people attended them c. 1896. Meanwhile, Penn-Lewis helped in the founding of new YWCA branches.

In 1895, Penn-Lewis served as a speaker in the annual Mildmay Conference. Her message at the Conference was published in booklet form under the title The Pathway to Life in God (1895). It was Penn-Lewis first published book, and is considered the beginning of her literary career. The book was translated into other languages, and 75,000 copies were reportedly distributed.

In 1896, Penn-Lewis started traveling internationally as part of her speaking ministry. The first country she visited was Sweden. Between 1896 and 1898, Penn-Lewis travelled to Belfast, Denmark, various cities in England, the Grand Duchy of Finland, the Russian Empire, Scotland, and South Wales. She came in contact with the local royalty in both Russia and Scandinavia.

In 1897, Penn-Lewis reportedly first visited Keswick, Cumbria, where she "prayed publicly". She returned there as a public speaker in 1898. In 1901, she served as a speaker at the Scottish Bridge of the Allan Keswick Convention. There was controversy at the time, because she addressed a mixed audience of men and women. She was originally supposed to teach only in the women's meetings of the Convention, but she was asked to step in for a missing speaker. In subsequent years, Penn-Lewis attracted an audience of male ministers, who attended the women's meetings just to hear her speeches.

Penn-Lewis reportedly struggled with an unspecified lung disease throughout her public career, and at times had to cease traveling or speaking in order to recuperate. It has been speculated by her biographers that this mysterious disease was tuberculosis. She described her health problems as a "baptism of suffering". Her repeated recoveries reinforced in Penn-Lewis the belief that her God wanted her to continue with her ministry. She wrote books, such as Thy Hidden Ones: Studies in the Song of Solomon and The Story of Job, while recuperating.

Penn-Lewis visited Canada and the United States on a speaking tour. R. A. Torrey invited her to speak at the Moody Bible Institute in Chicago. Albert Benjamin Simpson invited her to speak at the Gospel Tabernacle in New York. Penn-Lewis also delivered speeches at the Missionary Institute of Nyack, New York, and various private settings in Upstate New York. At the time, Torrey described Penn-Lewis as one of the most gifted speakers which the world has ever known.

In her next significant speaking tour, Penn Lewis traveled to India. She wanted to encourage the Christian workers active in the country. She published the booklet The Word of the Cross in India, primarily aimed at a local audience. This book is also known as The Bible Booklet. It has reportedly received translations to about 100 different languages and dialects.

== Welsh revival ==
Penn-Lewis was involved in the 1904–1905 Welsh Revival, which led to the mental and physical collapse of Evan Roberts.

While attending the 1902 Keswick Convention, Penn-Lewis was approached by an informal group of Welsh ministers. They wanted to establish a similar convention in Wales, and asked for her help. She agreed with their cause, and used her contacts to organize the Llandrindod Wells Convention. The first such convention took place in 1903. Penn-Lewis became a regular platform speaker in this convention.

During the Welsh Revival, Penn-Lewis served as a spiritual mentor to several of its leaders. She wrote her own reports on the movement under the title The Awakening in Wales. Her reports helped in drawing international attention to the movement. Starting in November 1904, Penn-Lewis also wrote weekly reports about the Revival for the periodical The Life of Faith.

There was an ongoing dispute over the ideas of speaking in tongues and Signs and Wonders associated with this Revival. In 1908, Penn-Lewis addressed the topic through her series of articles under the title An Hour of Peril. In her words, the Revival movement included "erroneous teachings centered primarily around the experience of physical manifestations". She viewed several of these physical manifestations as the work of demons, and a parody of the work of the Holy Spirit.

Writing for the periodical The Overcomer, Penn-Lewis criticized speaking in tongues as the work of "evil spirits". This made her a target of criticism for the Pentecostal movement, which viewed speaking in tongues in a positive light. On the other hand, F. B. Meyer supported Penn-Lewis' views.

In 1909, Penn-Lewis resigned from her position of leadership in Keswick’s women’s meetings . In 1911, she also resigned from her position in the Llandrindod Wells Convention. Her resignations were connected to increased criticism in her role within the Keswick movement, and her frustration at having less opportunities to speak to a wide audience.

After the breakdown by Roberts, he stayed with the Penn-Lewises from 1905. He and Penn-Lewis co-wrote War on the Saints (1912). The book continued the controversy over whether demons were influencing Revival-associated beliefs. The writers described their book as "a testimony against the outbreak of demons upon the spiritual Church, which followed the outpouring of the Spirit of God in Wales." Both writers blamed Satan for the activities in the unconscious mind, and both writers believed that Christian believers could fall victim to spirit possession. There was a theological dispute about the validity of either idea.

== The Overcomer ==
In 1908, Penn-Lewis and Evan Roberts co-founded the monthly periodical The Overcomer. It was aimed at an audience of Christian workers. Penn-Lewis published a "personal letter" in every issue. The periodical included religious teachings, responses to the readers' questions, a prayer watch, and notices for the monthly meetings at Eccleston Hall which were organized by Penn-Lewis. It reportedly had an international audience, with readers in Europe, Central Africa, South Africa, North America, South America, and China. Besides the English-language editions of the periodical, there were French-language and Italian-language versions.

In 1912, Penn-Lewis organized the Matlock Conference. It was an "open conference", with no set programs or leaders. There were key speakers, but attendees were invited to contribute to the Conference's prayers, singing and testimonies. During the Conference's teatime sessions, there were exchanges of questions and answers among the attendees. Penn-Lewis also helped organize a "Soul Clinic" or "Student Class", to address the spiritual struggles of "less mature" workers.

While the Matlock Conference include some unique features, it did not survive for long. It "ran for three years", and was last held c. 1914. In 1914, Penn-Lewis and Roberts agreed to close down The Overcomer, feeling that it had already completed its goals. There were various contributing factors to the periodical's demise. First, Penn-Lewis had maintained a personal correspondence with her readers, but felt increasingly unable to handle the "burden of work". Second, her health had further declined. Third, the beginning of World War I had an impact on the magazine itself.

In 1920, The Overcomer was revived as a quarterly magazine with new goals. Its stated goal was to "challenge spiritual apostasy, proclaim the Cross, and remind believers of the return of Christ". Roberts was not involved with this incarnation of the magazine.

== World War I ==
During World War I, Penn-Lewis continued to write new works. Her works were published and distributed with "special permission of the censor’s office". Penn-Lewis campaigned for the rights of conscientious objectors, and protested against the distribution of alcoholic drinks to "new military recruits".

In 1917, her study The Warfare with Satan was included in the 10th volume of The Fundamentals, an influential publication of Christian fundamentalism. It covered her teachings on the topic of spiritual warfare.

== Post-war years ==
In 1919, Penn-Lewis published her book The Magna Carta of Christian Women, a defence of the right of women to preach. She drew inspiration from the works of Catherine Booth and Katharine Bushnell.

The main argument was that the Christian Church violates the laws of the Holy Spirit when it "denies one half of the Church the right to speak in the assembly and subjects itself to man-made ordinances." Penn-Lewis also argued that Jesus himself had acted against "racial laws and all other distinctions".

In the 1920s, Penn-Lewis was preoccupied with her work for the revived version of The Overcomer and her other publications. She started a series of "Overcomer" conferences in various locations. She also organized "monthly Christian Worker meetings". She was essentially the only attraction at these conferences.

Due to her still declining health, Penn-Lewis delegated responsibility for The Overcomer to a number of men. They did not necessarily share her views, and the magazine diverged from the views of its founder. In about 1925, Penn-Lewis husband died, and her main source of income was a widow's pension. Their marriage had lasted for 45 years.

The owners of the hall used for Penn-Lewis' monthly meetings decided to transfer its ownership to her. She moved into an apartment within the hall, from where she maintained correspondence with Christian workers across the world. She still made speaking tours in Europe, primarily revisiting Scandinavia.

In July 1927, Penn-Lewis attended the 8th Swanwick conference. Later that month, she was a speaker at the Llandrindod Wells Jubilee Convention in Wales. On 15 August 1927, Penn-Lewis died suddenly, aged 66. Days before her death, she was still preparing her material for the next issue of The Overcomer. Her funeral service was conducted by Reverend Chilvers of Spurgeon's Tabernacle.

== Influences ==
Penn-Lewis was influenced by the Dutch Reformed, South African writer Andrew Murray, among others – her books contain quotes from him and references to his works. Frank Buchman, founder of the Oxford Group, credits Penn-Lewis with helping him to rid his life of depression, when he heard her speak at a Keswick Convention. She also influenced Johan Oscar Smith, the founder of Brunstad Christian Church and the missionary statesman Norman Grubb.

== Works ==
- War on The Saints (with Evan Roberts), 1912
- The Awakening in Wales & Some of the Hidden Springs
- The Spiritual Warfare
- The Centrality of the Cross
- Thy Hidden Ones
- Dying to Live
- Conquest of Canaan
- Face to Face
- All Things New
- Story of Job
- Fruitful Living
- Life in the Spirit
- Opened Heavens
- The Cross of Calvary
- "The Magna Charta of Woman"
- Soul and Spirit
- The Battle for the Mind
- The Warfare with Satan
- "Power for Service"

She founded the magazine The Overcomer, which still appears.

== See also ==
- Margaret E. Barber
- Watchman Nee
- David Morrieson Panton
