= Brunstad Christian Church =

Worldwide evangelical non-denominational Christian church

- Orientation: evangelical, non-denominational
- Leader: Kåre Johan Smith
- Region: Worldwide
- Founder: Johan Oscar Smith
- Origin: 1905; Horten, Norway
- Congregations: more than 220
- Members: more than 20,000
- Official website: http://bcc.no/
- Logo: BCC logo.svg

Brunstad Christian Church (BCC) is a worldwide evangelical non-denominational Christian church. In 2025, it would have 25,000 members in 50 countries. As many as two thirds of its members live outside Norway. For many years the group did not have a formal name and was referred to as Smith's Friends, particularly in Norway.

== History ==
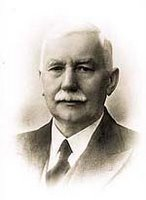
Johan O. Smith

Johan Oscar Smith (1871–1943), the church's founder, was originally a member of the Methodist Church in Norway. After a religious conversion in 1898 Smith began preaching to small gatherings. In 1905, his brother Aksel Smith (1880–1919) joined him. Smith had early contact with the Pentecostal movement in Norway and Aksel Smith cooperated with Thomas Ball Barratt during the first few years after Barratt introduced Pentecostalism to Norway in 1906–1907. As both the Pentecostal movement and Smith's group developed, they became increasingly wary of each other, with Barrat accusing Smith of creating schism within his group, as some of his followers joined Smith.

In 1908, Johan Oscar Smith met Elias Aslaksen (1888–1976) while serving in the Norwegian Navy. Under the leadership of Johan Oscar Smith, Aksel Smith, and Elias Aslaksen the group began to grow quickly. In World War I, Smith, as a Naval officer, partook in patrols of the Norwegian coast, which enabled him to develop relationships with believers and establish churches in several Norwegian coastal towns. During the 1930s churches were established in inland Norway, most notably in Hallingdal and Valdres. During this period, congregations were also established in Denmark.

From the 1950s, the church began to spread throughout Western Europe, including in Germany, Switzerland, and the Netherlands, after several church leaders were invited to participate in the Pentecostal conferences held at Leonberg during the 1950s. In the 1960s and 1970s, the Brunstad Christian Church spread further to Eastern Europe, the United Kingdom, North America, Australia, Africa, and Asia. Churches were first established in South America in the 1970s.

Today, there are more than 220 congregations in more than 65 countries. The church has annual international conferences at Oslofjord Convention Center and regional conferences throughout the world. It has its own publishing house, Skjulte Skatters Forlag, publishing books and distributing audio-visual media intended for spiritual edification. The monthly journal Skjulte Skatter, ('Hidden Treasures') has been published every month since 1912.

In 2025, it would have 25,000 members in 50 countries.

== Organization ==
Brunstad Christian Church is an association of some 220 churches worldwide. The church has no ordained clergy and few members have any theological training. Leaders are appointed in each local church congregation on the basis of their perceived virtue, the confidence of members in the individual and their natural abilities. There are no elected leaders. When Johan Oscar Smith died in 1943, overall leadership of the church passed to Elias Aslaksen, followed by Sigurd Bratlie in 1976 and Kåre J. Smith in 1996. The church is non-denominational and has little formal association with other churches.

=== Members worldwide ===
Country	Number of members	Source
Norway	9,272	
Germany	2,762	
The Netherlands	1,783	
USA/Canada	1,710	
Poland/Eastern Europe	1,520	
Denmark	977	
Asia	601	
Hungary	506	
Switzerland	520	
South America	510	
Europe (other)	370	
South Africa	340	
France	340	
Great Britain	320	
Africa (other)	300	
Australia	240	
Finland	230	
Middle East	80	
Sweden	2	
Total members	22,383	

== Teachings ==
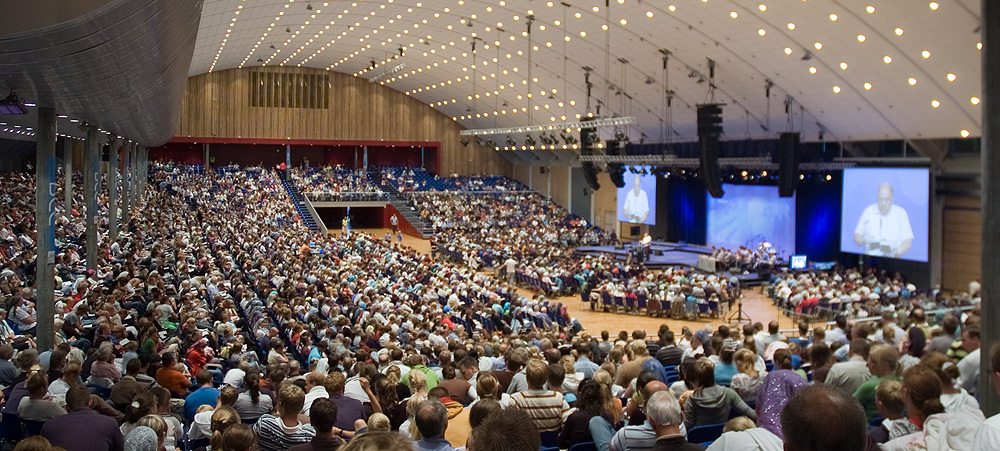
Conference at Oslofjord Convention Center

Brunstad Christian Church places its basis of faith in the New Testament and the belief that the Bible is the word of God. The fundamental elements of their faith are: faith in Jesus as God's son, faith in the Holy Spirit, forgiveness of sin, baptism and the Lord's Supper. They believe that the forgiveness of sins is undeserved and by received through Divine grace when one believes in Jesus Christ. They practice the baptism of adults by complete immersion into water.

As in other evangelical churches, the Bible is central and believed literally. Books and writings by past and present elders in the movement are held in high regard within Brunstad Christian Church. The most central internal publications are the monthly magazine, Skjulte Skatter and Smith's Letters, a collection of letters written by Johan O. Smith, mostly to his brother Aksel and Elias Aslaksen.

The church claims to differ from other non-denominational evangelical groups in its belief that Jesus not only died to bring forgiveness of our sins, but that he was also tempted to sin just like every human being. The church teaches that Jesus' victory over sin as a human being is the basis for personal victory over sin and transformation into Jesus image for believers, which is defined as the process of sanctification. A study undertaken by Norwegian theologian Geir Lie concluded that the theology of Brunstad Christian Church was influenced by the Keswick revival at the turn of the 20th century and by individuals such as Madame Guyón and Jessie Penn-Lewis.

== Mission ==
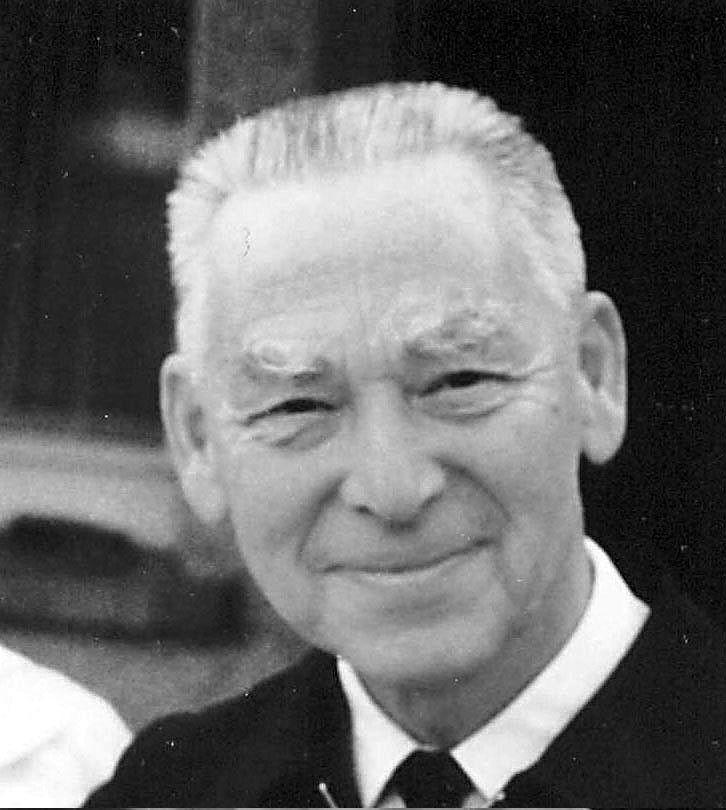
Sigurd Bratlie

Brunstad Christian Church is engaged in missionary and humanitarian work around the globe.

== Controversy ==
A 2020 documentary by Norwegian state broadcaster NRK raised questions about whether BCC is a sect, and alleged that church leaders were benefiting economically from the church in a manner that could be illegal. The BCC denied the allegations, and claim that they are part of a misinformation campaign run by the private Israeli intelligence company Psy-Group on behalf of an ex-member.

== Bibliography ==
- Bratli, Kjell Arne (1996): The Way of the Cross: An Account of Smith's Friends. Tananger, Norway: Skjulte Skatters Forlag. ISBN 82-91305-23-4
- Gjøsund, Alf (2004). Seier Likevel: Min Vei ut av Trossamfunnet Smiths Venner (Victory after all: My Way Out of Smith's Friends Fellowship) (Norwegian). Lunde. ISBN 82-520-4596-0
- Velten, Johan (2002). Ansatt av Gud: Et Kritisk Søkelys på Smiths Venner (Appointed by God: A Critical Review of Smith's Friends) (Norwegian). Genesis. ISBN 82-476-0249-0
