= Sigurd Bratlie =

Norwegian church leader

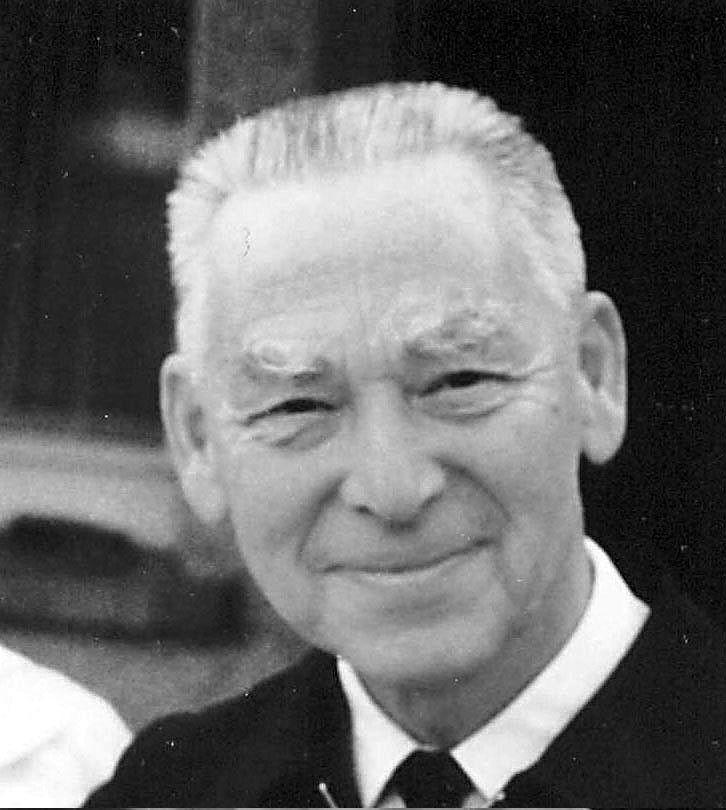
- Born: July 27, 1905; Nordstrand, Norway
- Died: January 24, 1996 (aged 90); Oslo, Norway
- Occupation: Tailor
- Title: Leader of Brunstad Christian Church
- Term: 1976-1996
- Predecessor: Elias Aslaksen
- Successor: Kåre Johan Smith
- Spouse: Rakel Smith
- Children: Sigurd Johan Bratlie

Sigurd Rudolf Guldbrandsen Bratlie (July 27, 1905 – January 24, 1996) was the leader of Brunstad Christian Church from 1976 until his death in 1996.

== Biography ==
Bratlie was born in Nordstrand, Norway and was the youngest of nine children. A tailor by trade, Bratlie met Johan Oscar Smith at a church service in 1920 while still serving his apprenticeship. He became an influential member, and later leader, of Brunstad Christian Church. He travelled widely as a missionary and was the subject of international media attention when he was imprisoned for 143 days in Baghdad, Iraq in 1978 for holding Christian meetings. He was also arrested for conducting missionary activity in Romania in 1974, a country then under the rule of dictator Nicolae Ceaușescu.

== Published works ==
Bratlie wrote numerous articles, mostly published in the Norwegian Christian journal Skjulte Skatter. He also authored several books, including The Bride, the Harlot and the End Times, The Grace that is in Christ Jesus, The Gospel of God, So Great a Salvation. He is also the author of three hymns in Brunstad Christian Church's hymn book Ways of the Lord.
