= Thomas Eccleston =

Thomas Eccleston may refer to:

- Thomas Eccleston (Jesuit) (1659–1743), English Jesuit
- Thomas of Eccleston, 13th-century English Franciscan chronicler
