= Elias Aslaksen =

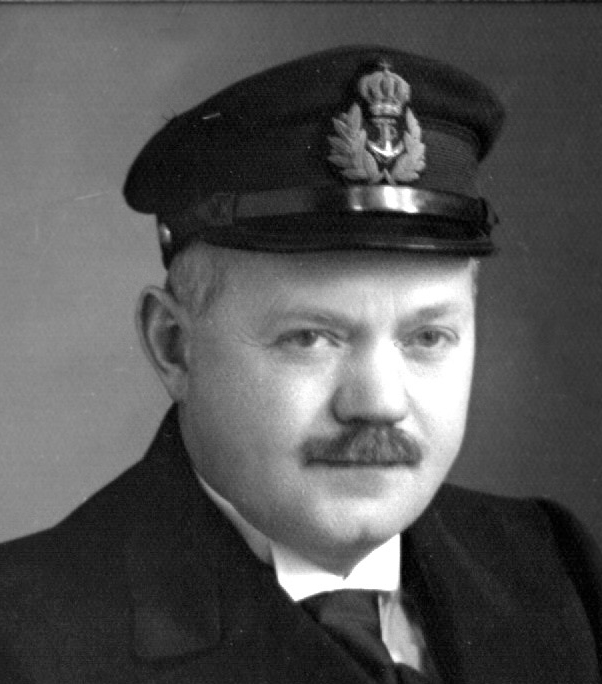
- Aslaksen in naval uniform
- Born: April 19, 1888; Christiania, Norway
- Died: May 10, 1976 (aged 88); Hønefoss, Norway
- Title: Leader of Brunstad Christian Church
- Term: 1943-1976
- Predecessor: Johan Oscar Smith
- Successor: Sigurd Bratlie
- Children: 12

Elias Aslaksen (1888–1976) was the leader of Brunstad Christian Church from 1943 until his death in 1976.

== Biography ==
Aslaksen enlisted in the Royal Norwegian Navy and studied at the Norwegian Naval Academy, graduating in 1910 as the top student in the history of the academy.

Aslaksen met Johan Oscar Smith in 1908 while both served in the navy. Being an active Christian, Aslaksen had plans to travel to China as missionary, and studied for a short period at a Bible School in England. Following ongoing correspondence with Smith, Aslaksen became active in Smith's religious work. During the First World War, Aslaksen served with the navy, patrolling Norway's coastline. While on shore leave at various ports on Norway's south and west coast, he was an active and enthusiastic missionary, preaching the message of sanctification through victory over sin that Smith was also preaching.

After leaving the navy, Aslaksen dedicated his life to the work in the church and became a leading figure in the growth and development of the group now known as Brunstad Christian Church. In later years, Aslaksen travelled to Denmark, Germany, Finland, the Netherlands and England where churches were also established.

Although Aslaksen's main focus was his work for the church, he made significant contributions to society in general. He was instrumental in justifying the position of Christians in military service, explaining from the Bible that Christians both can and should participate in military service. In a broader sense, this led to a definition of Christian values that included both duty and loyalty to the society in which one lives.

Following Smith's death in 1943, Aslaksen became the leader of Brunstad Christian Church. He was a prolific writer and authored many articles, books and hymns.

Aslaksen died in Hønefoss, Norway on 10 May 1976. Sigurd Bratlie became the leader of Brunstad Christian Church after Aslaksen's death.
