= Thomas Eccleston (Jesuit) =

English Jesuit

Thomas Eccleston (1659–1743), was an English Jesuit.

== Life ==
Eccleston was the only son of Henry Eccleston, esq., of Eccleston Hall, Lancashire, by Eleanor, daughter of Robert Blundell, esq., of Ince Blundell. He was educated in the College of St. Omer, and afterwards continued his studies for two years (1677–9) in the English College at Rome. During the wars in Ireland, after the revolution of 1688, he held a captain's commission in King James's army. Being engaged in a duel which proved fatal to his antagonist, he was seized with remorse and determined to enter the religious state.

Accordingly, he returned to Rome, entered the Jesuit novitiate of Sant' Andrea in 1697, and was professed of the four vows in England in 1712. He was employed in the Yorkshire missions, and served Ingatestone Hall as chaplain to Lord Petre under the assumed name of Holland. From 11 August 1731 to 22 September 1737 he was rector of the college at St. Omer. He died on 30 December 1743.

== Legacy ==
He wrote a treatise on 'The Way to Happiness,'. His full-length portrait, pointing to his sword thrown upon the ground, was formerly hung in the hall at Eccleston.
