= United Methodist Church in Norway =

Christian organization based in Norway

- Classification: Protestantism
- Orientation: Methodism
- Polity: Connexionalism
- Bishop: Christian Alsted
- Associations: Christian Council of Norway
- Region: Norway
- Headquarters: Oslo, Norway
- Origin: 11 September 1856
- Branched from: United Methodist Church
- Congregations: 46
- Members: 10,684
- Official website: metodistkirken.no

United Methodist Church in Norway (Norwegian: Metodistkirken i Norge) is an annual meeting of the United Methodist Church covering Norway. It consists of 46 congregations and had 10,684 members in 2014.

Norway's first Methodist was Ole Peter Petersen, past of the Methodist Episcopal Church. He moved to Fredrikstad in 1849, resulting in the first congregations, Sarpsborg and Halden, being established in 1856. At first concentrated around the Oslofjord, the Methodist Church experienced a major expansion during the 1870 through 1890. Thereafter it entered a consolidation phase, especially related to diaconal activities. From the 1900s growth was hindered through the popularity of Pentecostalism.

== History ==
=== Establishment ===
The first Methodist in Norway was Ole Peter Petersen. A seaman, he had converted to Methodism while in New York City. He returned to Fredrikstad in 1849 and started preaching his new faith. Within months he had converted tens of people to the faith, in his hometown and in the neighboring Sarpsborg. Petersen returned to the US and was ordained a minister of the Methodist Episcopal Church in 1853. He returned to Norway that year and settled in Sarpsborg. In his rented home the second story was converted to a meeting room—the first Methodist facility in the country. The Danish minister Christian Willerup moved to the town and was appointed district superintendent for Scandinavia from 1856, and moved to Norway on 3 July.

The newly converted Methodists started discussing the incorporating their own denomination, as they were still members of the State Church. The newly established Dissenter Act paved way for independent churches. Petersen founded the first Methodist congregation in Norway on 11 September 1856 in Sarpsborg. On 3 November the second congregation was founded, in Fredrikshald (today Halden). Within a year of evangelizing Halden had seventy Methodists.

The new congregations were met with opposition from the State Church, and the parish minister in Halden attempted to forcefully cancel Methodist services. Some Lutheran ministers held speeches warning against the Methodists, but these often backfired with spectators instead choosing to convert to the new faith. The first major task in Sarpsborg was to build a church, as Petersen's attic was too small. Sarpsborg Methodist Church was inaugurated on 1 November 1857. Halden Methodist Church was inaugurated during Christmas 1858.

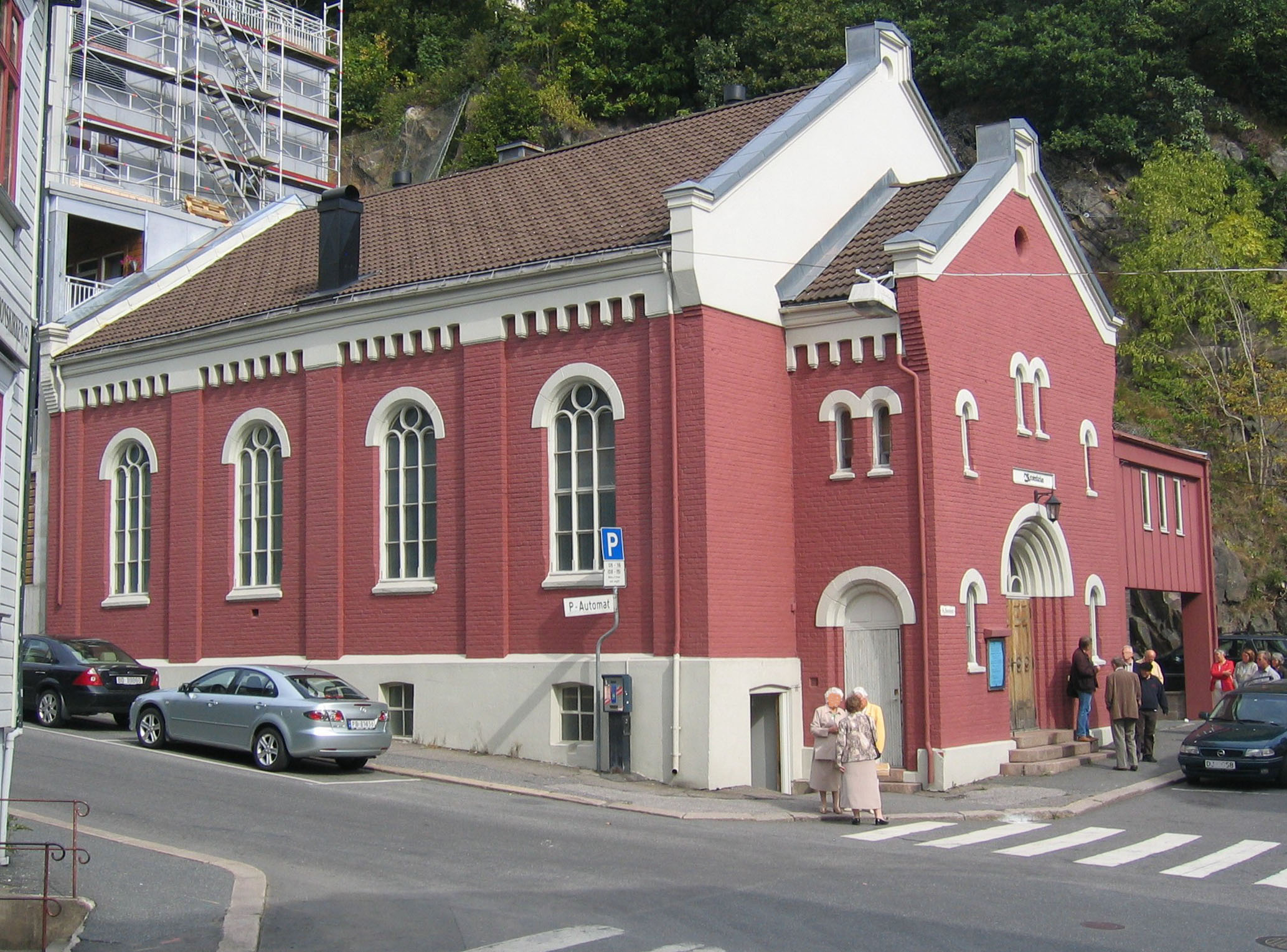
Arendal Methodist Church

Hans Isaksen and Markus Nilsen were hired by the Methodist Episcopal Church from December 1852 to conduct mission in Grenland. They established a congregation in Porsgrunn on 22 May 1858. From Østfold the faith gradually spread to other parts of the country, usually through migration of converts. Congregations were incorporated when a locality had anything from three to a dozen Methodists. The Porsgrunn congregation had 70 members in 1859; the same year there were 441 Methodists in the country. A congregation with thirty members was founded in Høland and Eidsberg on 22 March 1860.

A congregation was founded in Fredrikstad on 8 May 1963 and in Furnes on 19 May 1866. Preaching commenced in Oslo in 1857, although the congregation was not founded until 2 January 1865. Arendal was evangelized through returning seamen from the United States, independent of the efforts in the rest of the country. The congregation was established on 31 May 1868.

During the 1860s the Methodist Episcopal Church decided that the Jerusalem Church in Copenhagen should be built as a mother church for Scandinavia. A large amount of funds, also from Norway, went into the construction. Opened in 1866, the structure proved too large and only served to drain Methodist financial resources out of Norway. Willerup moved back to Copenhagen and used his time supervising the church construction instead of supervising the pastors. The 1860s saw many "lost opportunities" due to late administrative responses and limited funds for pastors and missionaries.

Most Methodists came from the lower classes, mostly craftsmen in towns. This made it difficult to raise funds. The church also experienced a significant loss of membership due to emigration to the United States. For instance the congregation in Hobøl lost 17 of its 43 members to emigration in 1865 alone. Although the Methodist community in Norway grew in the first years of the 1860s, to dropped slightly in the mid-decade. By 1866 it had 757 members.

Although the Dissident Act secured freedom of religion, Methodists were subject to religious persecution from clergy and lay members of the State Church. This included spreading anti-Methodist information, threats of losing jobs and welfare benefits, discrimination of school children and social isolation. The Dissident Act also specified that dissidents could not work as senior state officials, teachers, military officers or political positions. Therefore, the middle and upper classes never converted during the first decades.

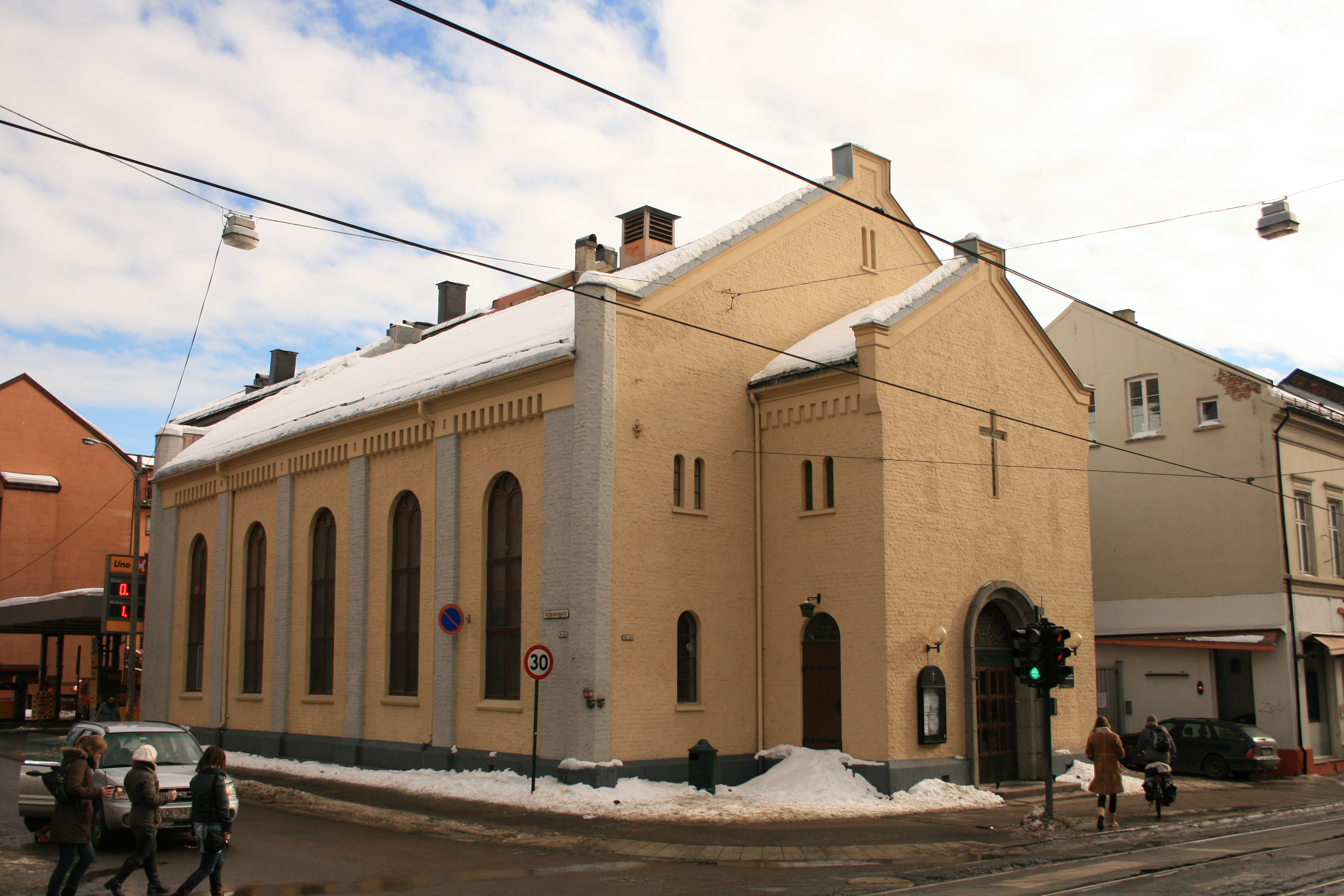
First Methodist Church of Oslo

=== Growth in the late 19th century ===
Mission Secretary John Price Durbin visited Norway in 1866 and found the lack of supervision to be the Achilles heel. Petersen was appointed district superintendent in 1869, replaced two years later by Martin Hansen. Annual mission conferences were held from 1867, leading up to formal annual conferences on 17 August 1876. Among its first tasks was the translation and distribution of literature in Scandinavian. A publishing trust, Den Religiøse Traktatforening, was founded in 1867. The first magazine was Den lille Børnevenn, founded in October 1871. The children's magazine later took various names, finally Barnevennen. The first congregational magazine was Evangelisk Kirketidende, first published on 28 January 1872. It later took the name Kristelig Tidende. By 1877 the Methodists had bought their own printing press. A seminary was established in Oslo in May 1874, but closed five years later due to lack of funding. from then theological education continued through a combination of correspondence and conferences.

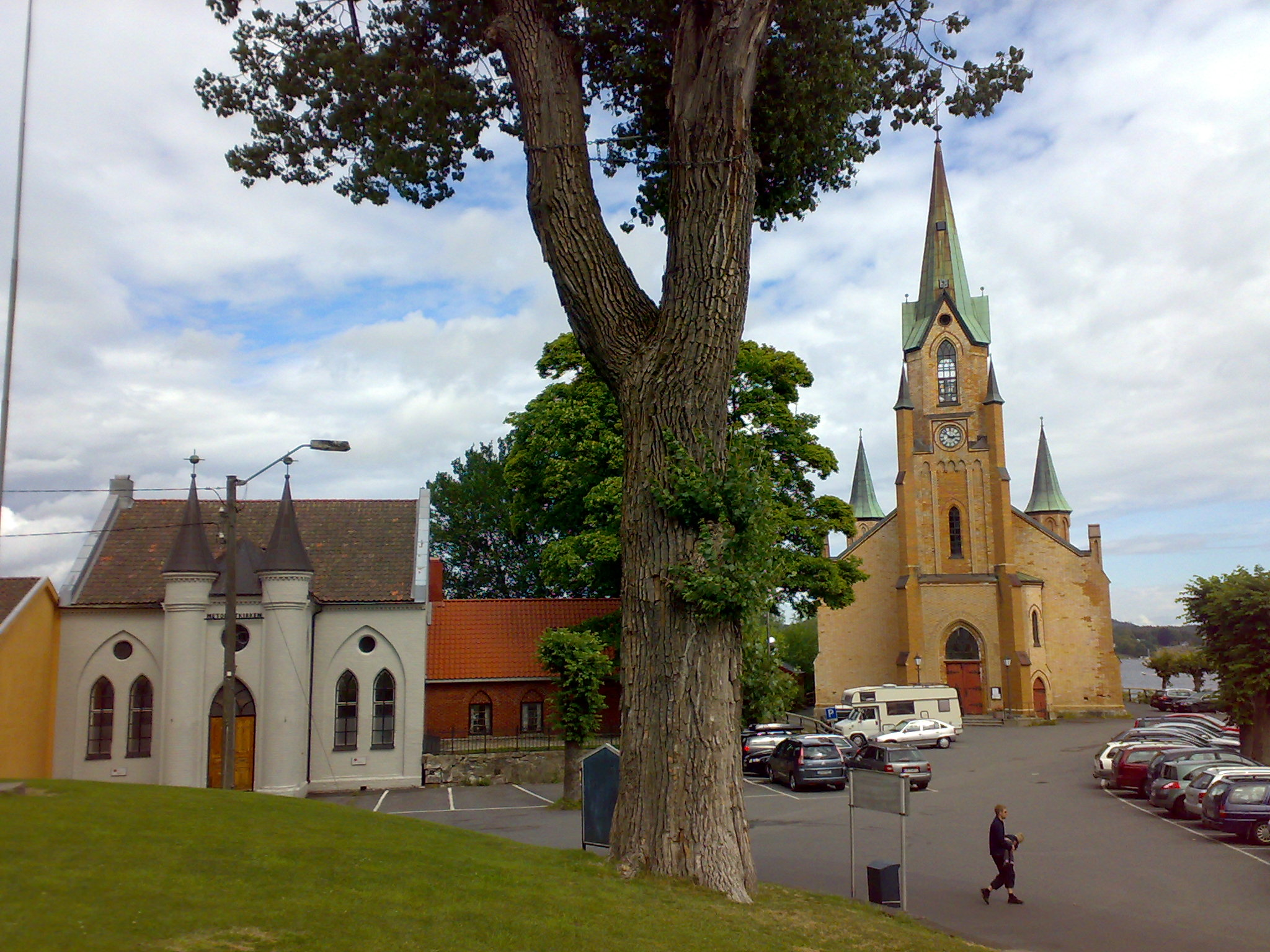
Kragerø Methodist Church (left) and Kragerø Church of the Church of Norway

Of 896 Methodists in Norway 1870, 498 lived in the neighboring towns of Fredrikstad, Sarpsborg and Halden. There were large congregations in Arendal (125 members), Oslo (112), Porsgrunn (98) and Halden (49), in addition to the small groups in Odalen and Furnes. From the mid-1870s the faith experienced a boom in congregations. In 1873, congregations in Hønefoss, Kongsberg, Kragerø, Larvik and Skien were incorporated. This was followed up the next year with Brevik and Stavanger. Sandnes and Tønsberg congregations were founded in 1878 and Bergen in 1879. By then membership had reached 2,823.

While the development through the 1870s was rather sporadic, it became systematic from 1877, when employed missionaries, later titled pastors, were sent to towns to hold public meetings and start a congregations. As earlier, the Methodist Church was most successful at converting the working class, especially first-generation immigrants from the countryside. Methodism allowed—in contrast to the State Church—emotions to be addressed in liturgy and displayed in worship. This was decisive for many new believers and appealed to the lower classes, providing a substitute to less decadent activities.

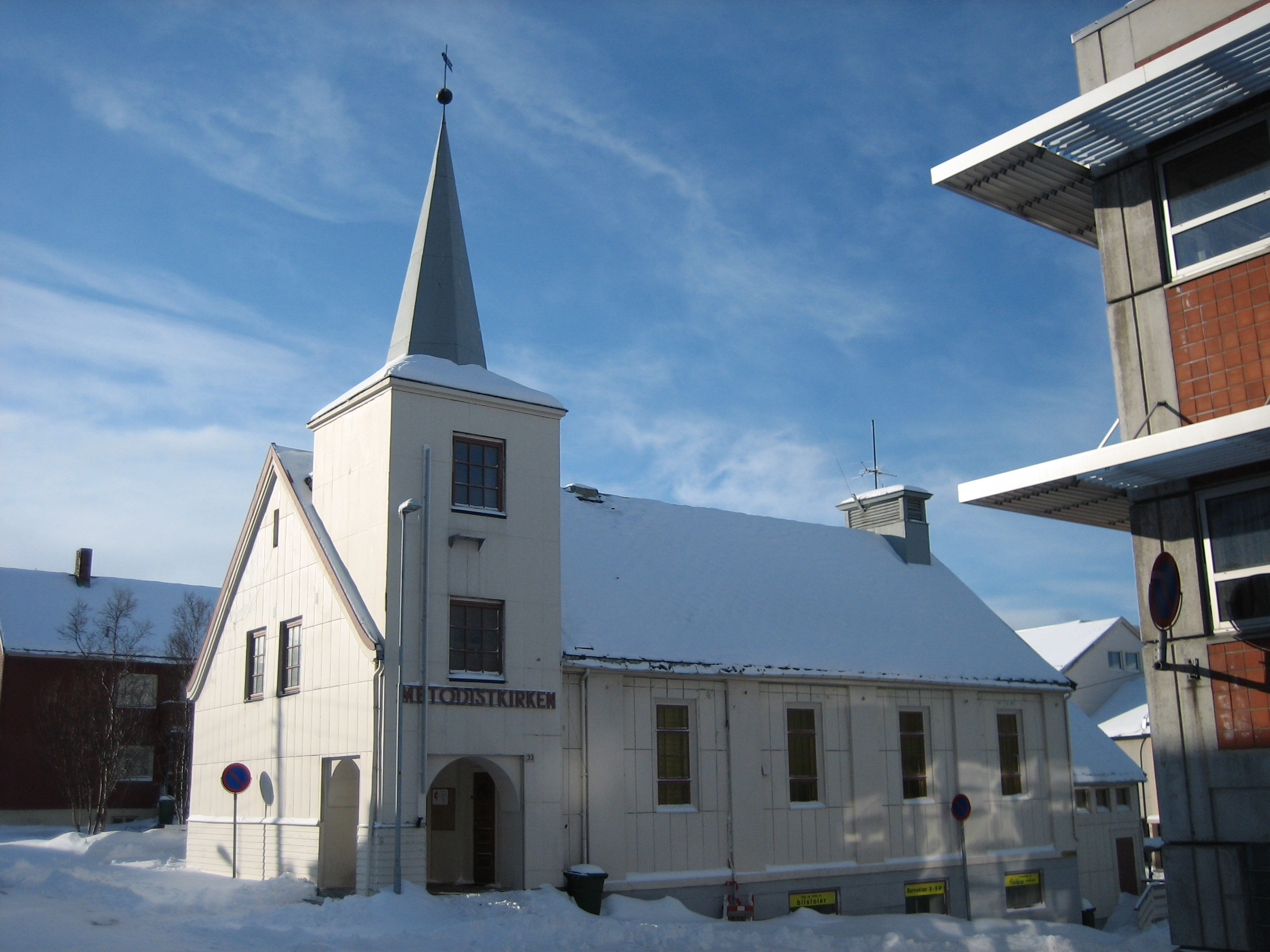
Hammerfest Methodist Church was the world's most northerly Methodist congregation when established in 1890.

During the 1880s focus shifted to smaller places, especially along the southern and western coastline, and further north. Kristiansand was incorporated in 1880, followed a year later by Trondheim. Flekkefjord was founded in 1882, followed by Haugesund and Langesund/Bamble in 1883. Kristiansund and Lista were established in 1886, then Oslo Central and Levanger the following year. Egersund, Ålesund, Bodø and Tromsø were incorporated in 1889 and finally Hammerfest in 1890. By then the membership had reached 4,418. Thereafter there was little growth in the number of congregations and rather focus on increasing their sizes.

=== Institutionalization ===
The various congregations had since their inaugurations run activities such as Sunday schools, choirs, women association and bookstores. Norwegian Methodists had at large an anti-intellectual sentiment, preferring learning through the Holy Spirit rather than through courses. Subsequently, there was opposition to establishment of a seminary. Only through American pressure was a seminary established in Oslo on 22 October 1888. The following year planning of an orphanage started. This opened in Oslo on 1 January 1892. Prior to this the State Church had hindered orphans from being raised by Methodists due to their faith. Originally with nine orphans, it moved in 1899 and increased to twenty.

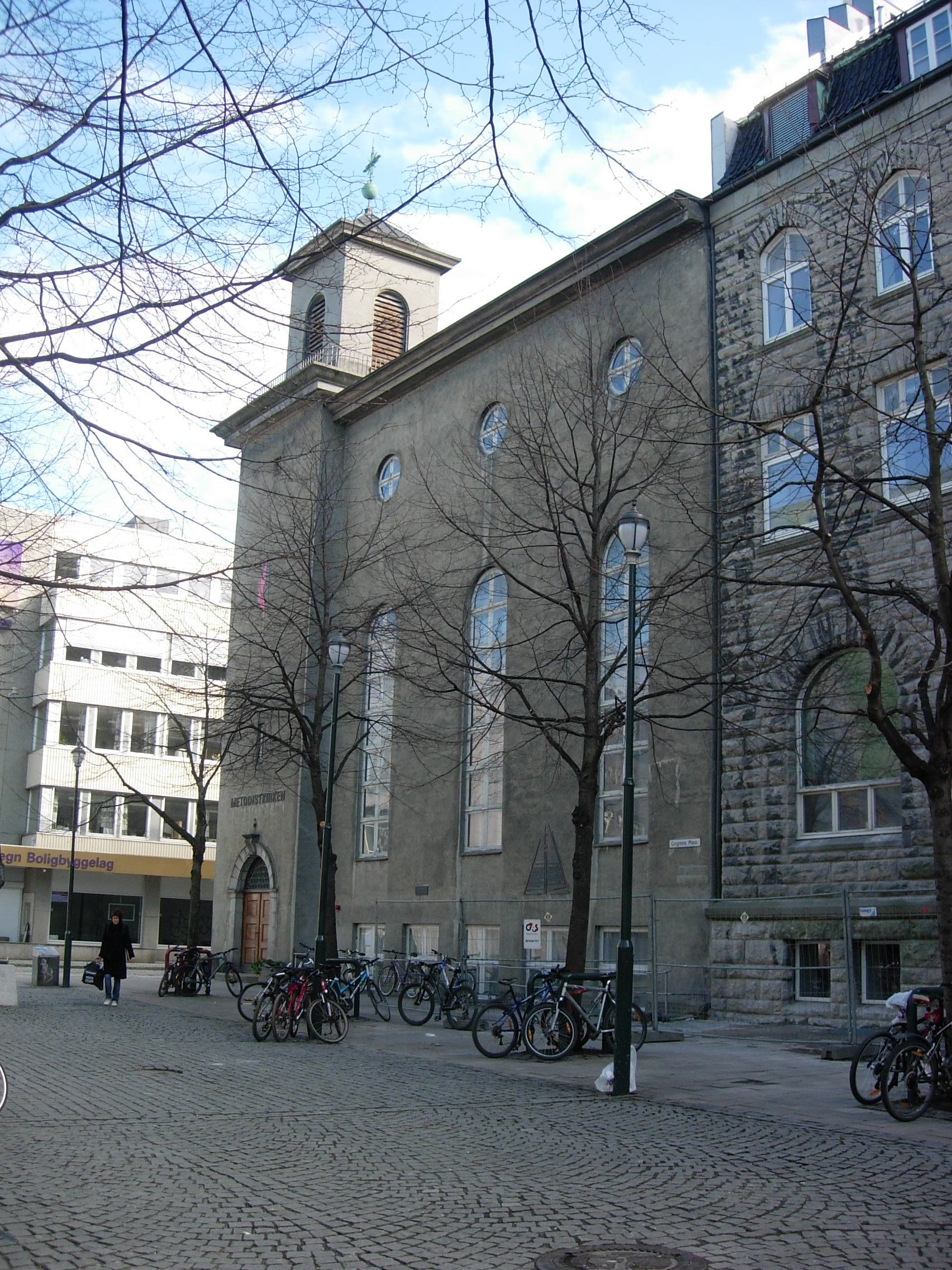
Trondheim Methodist Church

The next step was establishment of a nursing home. A home for nurses at Rikshospitalet opened in 1897, gradually transformed to a nursing college. By 1904 it had 28 nurses and 12 students, and a second such home was established in Bergen. By 1912 there were 59 Methodist-supported nurses and 11 students in six communities. By then they had trained 142 nurses. The first hospital was opened in Bergen 1914, initially with 50 beds. These were all branded at Betanien.

John Heyl Vincent was in 1900 appointed the first Methodist bishop with a seat in Europe. With a seat in Zürich, this had little to say for Norway, which continued to have short visits, at about the same frequency as for former American rotating bishop visits. The Methodist church experienced stagnation from the turn of the century. The institutionalization was carried out to meet the need for social action in fear of the church losing its social role. Yet the turn of the century marked a strong period for the Mainline Protestant free churches. The first external Methodist movement in Norway came in 1888 with the establishment of the Salvation Army. They targeted the same lower class as the Episcopal Church, yet legally remained part of the State Church.

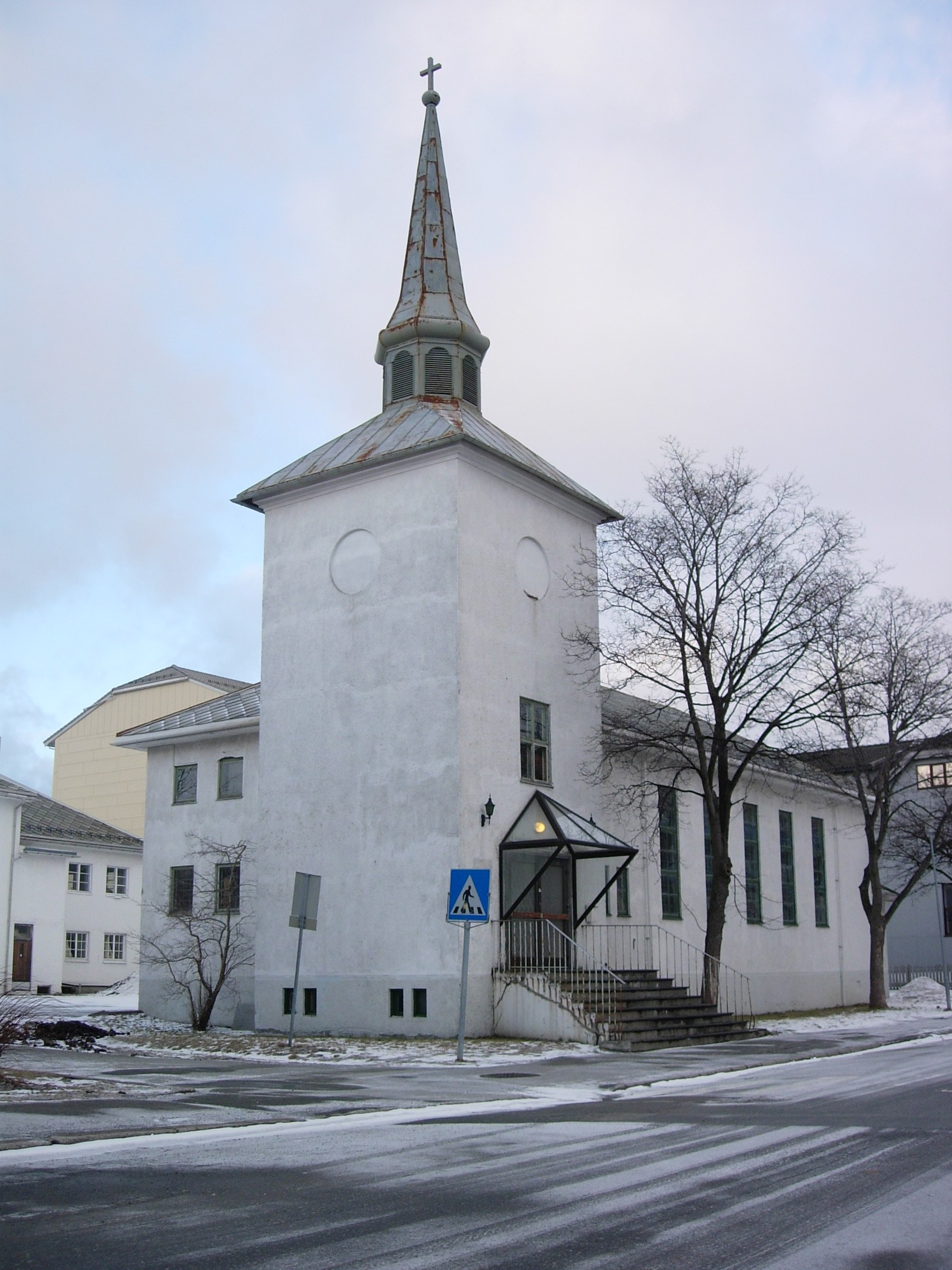
Bodø Methodist Church

Methodist pastor turned Pentecost Thomas Ball Barratt started preaching Charismatic Christianity, which soon started claiming Methodist turf. The Charismatic movement took most of the growth of the free churches. One challenge was that the Methodist preachings remained unchained for decades and that the theology increasingly was regarded as irrelevant for the working class. A particularity of the age was Methodism's inability to retain young adults, especially those with higher education. The fundamentalist Biblical understanding persevered in Norway in part due to lack of translation of newer English Methodist literature. It also continued to embrace puritanism, banning attending theaters, the reading of novels, dancing, and the wearing jewelry and fancy clothes, among other regulations.

Meanwhile, the Methodist Church established an inner mission in 1908, based on an 1895 proposal by Barratt. Each congregation thereby organized an inner mission committee and allocated money to evangelism. These were used to fund mobile preachers. Outer mission was organized in 1907 following the visit of the African mission bishop, Joseph Crane Hartzell. It was initially tied to the Epworth League, the newly established group for young adults. At first only monetary funding was granted and Norwegian Methodist missionaries were not dispatched until Serene Løland traveled to China in 1921.

By 1905, 13,640 people had joined the Methodist Episcopal Church. Thirteen percent emigrated, and by 1905 there were 5,625 members. During the 1910s various inner mission and outer mission groups were established within the State Church. These employed many of the same methods as the Methodists. Meanwhile, the Methodist Church became better organized, in combination dwindling the differences between the denominations. As a result, ecumenical connections were strengthened and work focused on counteracting atheistic and secular movements.

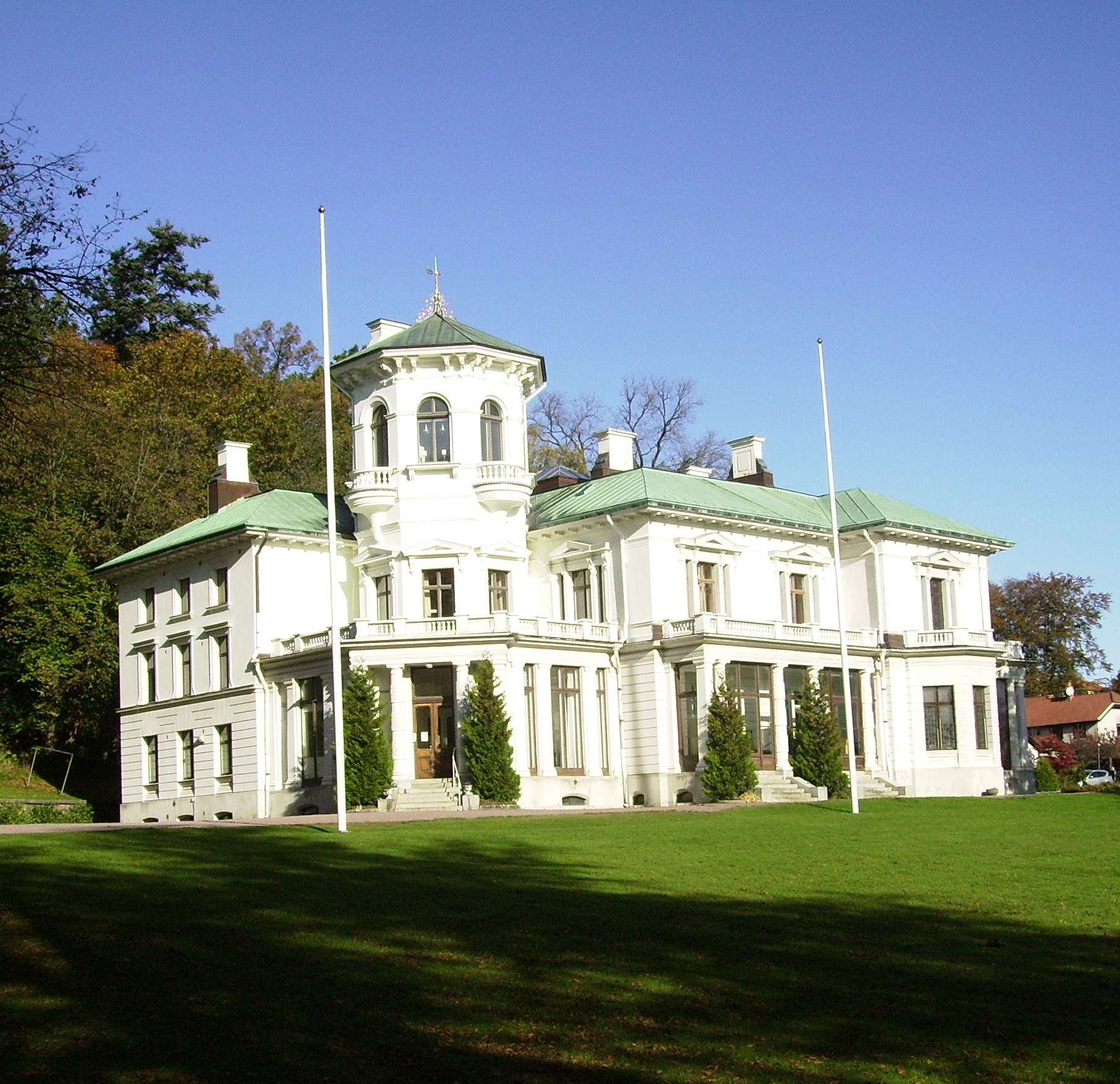
Överås in Gothenburg, Sweden, was home to the Nordic Theological Seminary from 1924 to 2007

The home mission was reorganized in 1916 and increased focus was placed on evangelism in Northern Norway. Scandinavia was made its own episcopal area in 1920, with Anton Bast as its inaugural bishop. An early task for the episcopal area was the establishment of a common Nordic theological seminar. This was established on 16 February 1924 at Överås in Gothenburg, Sweden. For an intermediate period there were three years in Oslo and two in Gothenburg, later all education took place in Sweden.

Betanien Oslo was upgraded to as clinic in 1925, a year after it bought a nursing home at Vestre Furunes in Asker Municipality. The institution was rebranded Betanien Hospital in 1930. The orphanage in Oslo moved to Nordstrand in May 1927. Smaller orphanages and old people's homes were established by congregations around the country. Also Betanien Bergen was gradually expanded during the 1920s and 1930s. Betanien Hospital Skien was the first hospital to open in the town when it was inaugurated on 7 January 1939.

Outer mission grew during the 1930s, with the second foreign missionary, to India, dispatched in 1931. Four years later a missionary was sent to Algeria, and to Portuguese East Africa two years after that. From the 1950s the number of missionaries to Africa increased dramatically, and especially Algeria and Southern Rhodesia were targeted.

The Methodist Church established a bible school in Oslo in 1941. Odd Hagen was elected at the Nordic Central Conference in 1953 as the first Norwegian bishop.

== Organization ==
The denomination is part of the worldwide United Methodist Church. It is organized as an annual conference within the Nordic and Baltic Episcopal Area, under the auspices of Bishop Christian Alsted. Norway has its own annual conference with lay and ordained representatives. In addition to a main board, it appoints a series of subcommittees.

== Institutions ==
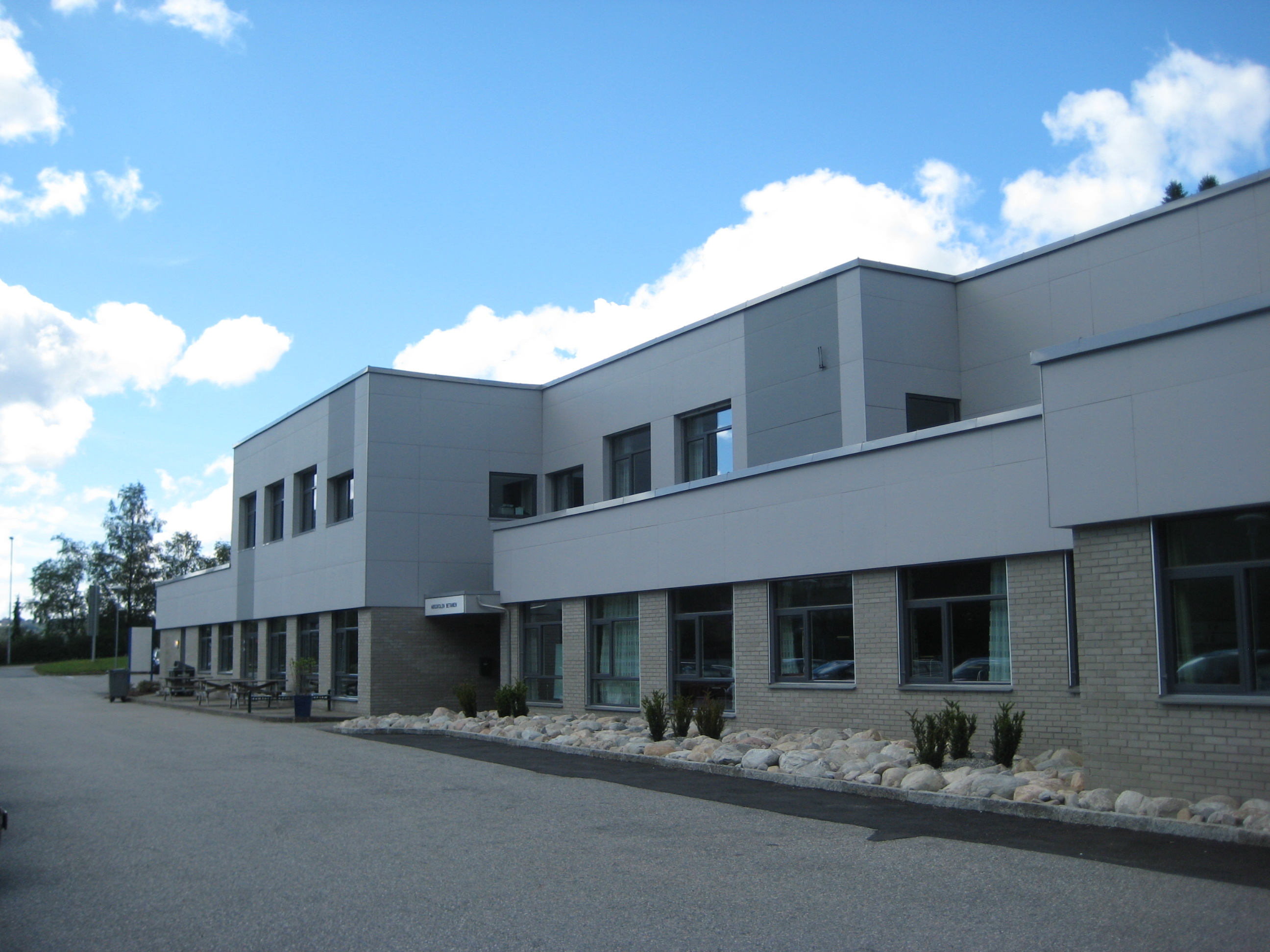
Betanien University College in Bergen

The main diaconal activity is through the Betanien Foundation Bergen, which is situated in the Fyllingsdalen neighborhood. It operates a complex with a nursing home, rehabilitation center, polyclinic and psychiatric center. It also includes a kindergarten. The foundation runs Betanien University College, which offers a bachelor's degree in nursing. The Methodist Church also owns diaconal foundations in Oslo and Skien, and operates a nursing home at Kalfaret in Bergen.

The Methodist Theological Seminary cooperates with the MF Norwegian School of Theology to provide education for pastors and deacons. It also offers part-time education for lay preachers. The school is situated in Oslo. The church used to own Soltun Folk High School in Tjeldsund Municipality.

== See also ==
- United Methodist Church in Sweden

== Bibliography ==
- Bernhardt, Eilert; Hardy, Aage (1956). Metodistkirken i Norge 100 år (in Norwegian). Oslo: Norsk Forlagsselskap.
- Hassing, Arne (1991). Religion og makt : metodismen i norsk historie (in Norwegian). Trondheim: Tapir. ISBN 82-519-0954-6. ISSN 0333-029X.
