= Surrey Chapel, Norwich =

Church in Norwich, England

Coordinates: 52.6354°N 1.2931°E

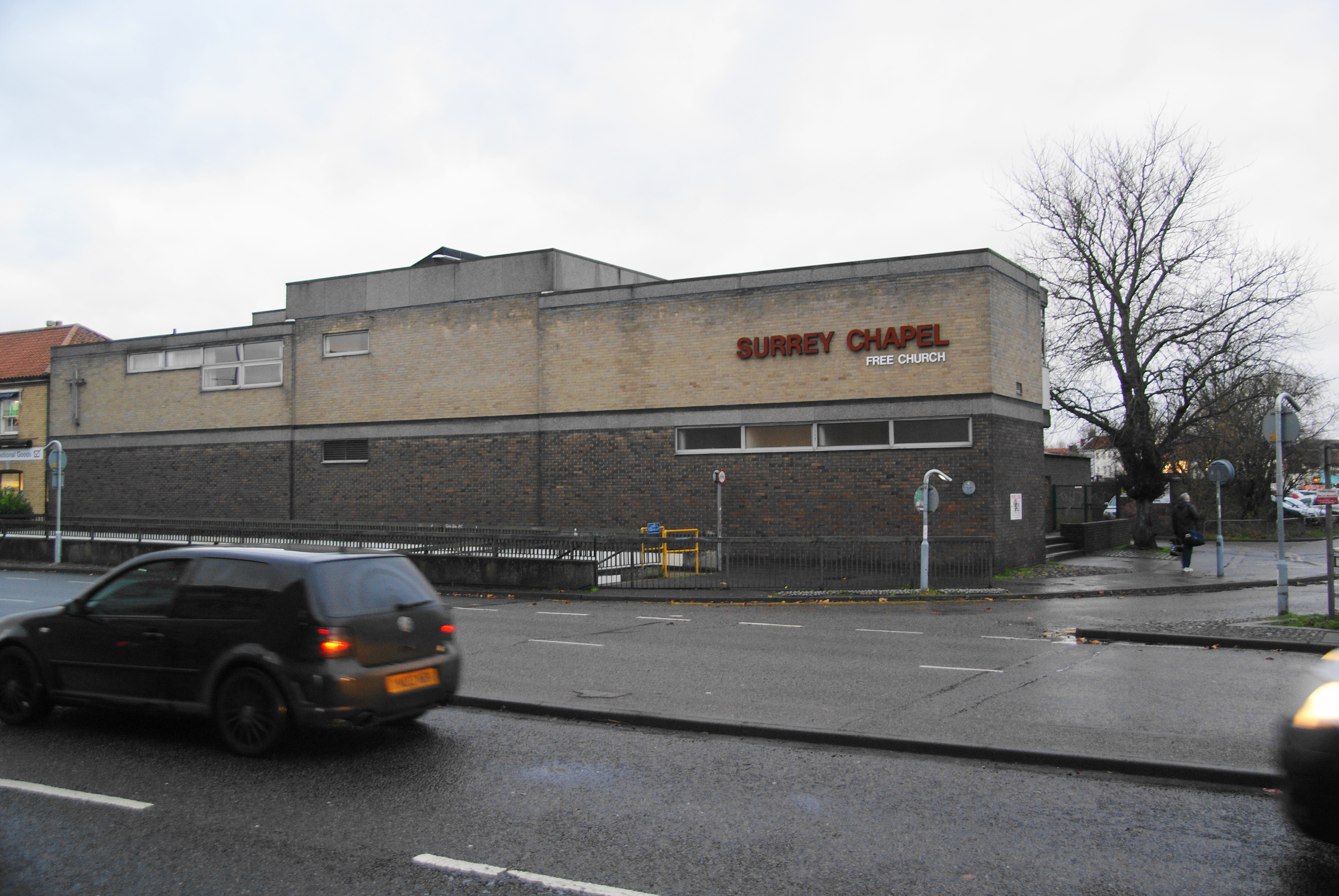
Surrey Chapel

Surrey Chapel is a Christian church in Norwich, England. In November 2022 its name was changed to CityGates Church, Norwich.

Founded in 1854 by Evangelical Robert Govett, Surrey Chapel is a Free Evangelical church in Norwich, Norfolk, England. It met originally in a public hall in Surrey Street (which has been called 'no earthly gem' architecturally). It is known as being home to the missionary Elsie Tilney, who, during World War II, travelled to Vittel to assist in the rescue of Jews and other foreign nationals imprisoned by Nazi Germany. The church was also attended by British missionary Margaret E. Barber. In the twenty-first century, the chapel was known for its work in the local community, including debt advice, and participation in the local Christian football league.
