= Margaret E. Barber =

British missionary in China

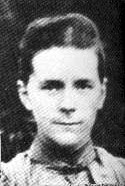
- Missionary to China
- Born: 1866; Suffolk, England
- Died: 1929 (aged 62–63) (Taiwan) Fuzhou, China

Margaret Emma Barber or M. E. Barber (1866–1930; Chinese: 和受恩; Pinyin: Hé Shòuēn; Foochow Romanized: Huò Sêu-ŏng), was a British missionary in China. She was born in 1866 in Peasenhall, Suffolk, England, the daughter of Louis (a wheelwright) and Martha (née Gibbs) Barber. The family moved to 59 St Martin's Lane, Norwich around 1876 and established a carriage-manufacturing business. The family home in Norwich was opposite St Martin's parish church which was intensely evangelical in the 1880 - 90s and must have had an influence on the Barber family. During the course of her life, she lived in China twice to preach the Christian gospel. She left her home and travelled in a lonely way thousands of miles. Barber, who initially went to China as an Anglican, became an independent missionary with informal ties to the Plymouth Brethren. She is best known for her influence on Watchman Nee (Nee Tuo-Sheng).

Along the south China coast (in Fuzhou), she and others regularly taught a Bible class at "White Teeth Rock". There she had contact with Nee who was studying at the Anglican Trinity College. Barber referred him to books by J. N. Darby, Madam Jeanne Guyon, Jessie Penn-Lewis, D. M. Panton, T. Austin Sparks, and of others, which had been of help to her. She also influenced others Chinese Christian leaders, including Leland Wang who later formed the Chinese Foreign Missionary Union.

== Life and Christian ministry ==
Miss Barber was an Anglican missionary sent by the Church Missionary Society (C.M.S.) to the city of Fuzhou, Fujian, China where she taught in the Tau Su Girls’ High School (a school founded and operated by the Church of England) for seven years. Known as an excellent missionary, her co-missionaries became jealous of her and fabricated a serious charge which caused her to be recalled from the field. Barber was known for her faith. For this reason, Barber decided not to vindicate herself concerning the charges made against her. She remained at home in Great Britain until years later the chairman of the mission board became aware of the case against her and that it was misrepresented. Persuading her to tell the truth, Barber told him the whole story and was fully vindicated before the mission board.

While she remained in England, Barber came into contact with D.M. Panton, the editor of the Christian magazine, The Dawn. Panton was both a student of the word and one who began to see that denominationalism was evil in the sight of God. During 1907 Miss Barber became a member of Surrey Chapel, Norwich and was also baptized at Surrey Chapel by full immersion. Through her relationship with Panton, Barber also began to see the denominations as evil in the sight of God.

Before the board could send her back to China, Barber resigned from the mission, considering that it was the right time to do so, even though she felt led by God to return to China. She returned to China in 1909 along with Miss Ballord another congregant member of Surrey Chapel not in connection with any mission, settling in a suburb of Fuzhou, with the spiritual support of Panton and the Surrey Chapel Mission Band, Norwich, where Panton ministered. The two women rented a house in Pagoda Anchorage where Barber lived until her death in 1930. Ballord continued to work in Pagoda Anchorage until 1950, when she returned to England.

Barber lived with little traveling and no publicity. Rather, she was content to just remain home and pray. She helped those who sought her counsel in seeking after the Lord, including Watchman Nee and his assistant Witness Lee. Furthermore, Barber lived by faith. She was not guaranteed regular funds from the Surrey Chapel Mission Band and had no outward means of support.

One of Barber's well-known characteristics was her anticipation of the second coming of Jesus Christ. This is evident in the many poems she wrote on waiting for Christ's return, some of which were later adapted into hymns. In one account given by Watchman Nee (concerning the eve of 1925):

Lord, will You really let the year 1925 pass away? Although it is the last day of the year, I still ask You to come today.

Barber died in 1930 in Anchorage Pagoda of Crohn's disease. All of her belongings, which included little more than her old Bible with all her notes, were left to Watchman Nee. In the March 1930 issue of Watchman Nee's periodical, ‘’The Present Testimony,’’ Nee made the following remarks concerning Miss Barber’s departure:

We feel most sorrowful concerning the news of the passing away of Miss Barber in Lo-Hsing Pagoda, Fukien. She was one who was very deep in the Lord, and in my opinion, the kind of fellowship she had with the Lord and the kind of faithfulness she expressed to the Lord are rarely found on this earth.”

— Watchman Nee, ’’Watchman Nee: A Seer of the Divine Revelation in the Present Age.’’ Anaheim: Living Stream Ministry, 1991:18. Print.

== Hymns ==
Barber did not leave behind any writings other than a small volume of poems (later changed into hymns) that was later published by Miss Ballord (Miss Ballord was her niece) in China. These compositions demonstrate her striving to live "in the Lord’s presence," as well as her eager anticipation of Christ's coming back. A stanza of Barber's poem reads:

If the path I travel
Lead me to the cross,
If the way Thou choosest
Lead to pain and loss,
Let the compensation
Daily, hourly, be
Shadowless communion,
Blessed Lord, with Thee.
