= Johan Oscar Smith =

Norwegian minister (1871–1943)

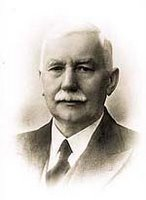
- Founder of Brunstad Christian Church
- Born: October 11, 1871; Fredrikstad, Norway
- Died: May 1, 1943 (aged 71); Horten, Norway
- Occupation: Master Chief Petty Officer
- Title: Leader of Brunstad Christian Church
- Term: 1905-1943
- Successor: Elias Aslaksen
- Spouse: Pauline Pedersen
- Children: Kristian Smith; Johanne Sandvik; Lydia Smith; Aksel Johan Smith; Rakel Bratlie; Helge Anker Smith; Ludvig Smith
- Parents: Christian Smith (father); Johanne Smith (mother)
- Family: Aksel Smith

Johan Oscar Smith (October 11, 1871 – May 1, 1943) was a Norwegian Christian leader who founded the evangelical non-denominational fellowship now known as Brunstad Christian Church.

== Early life and career ==
Smith was born in Fredrikstad, Norway and grew up in a Christian family. In his early years he lived in three different towns: Fredrikstad, Kristiansand, and Oslo.

At the age of fifteen, after completing school and a watchmaker's apprenticeship, Smith went to sea. At seventeen, he joined the Norwegian Navy where he served for the next forty years. Smith completed six years of military training, graduating at the top of his class and attaining the rank of Master Chief Petty Officer.

Smith married Pauline Pedersen in 1902. They had six children.

The surname "Smith" is not Norwegian. Smith's father, born Christian Johannessen, changed his name to Christian Johannessen Smith (before Johan Oscar was born) in preparation for emigration to Australia or New Zealand. As it turned out he did not emigrate, but the new name continued in the family.

== Religious leadership ==
After attending a Methodist church service, Smith experienced a conversion on May 17, 1898, while he was on watch duty on board the monitor Thor. Smith began attending Methodist services regularly, later holding his own meetings with small groups of young people. Smith soon left the Methodists, having decided that none of the believers he knew understood his seriousness in pursuing sanctification, as this was not generally the focus of mainstream Christian teaching. Over the next few years, he was joined by his younger brother, Aksel and in 1908 by Elias Aslaksen, then a naval cadet.

During World War I, Smith and Aslaksen were deployed to patrol Norway's west coast on HNoMS Sleipner. While on shore leave they held meetings wherever possible, thereby gathering a group of people who shared an interest in Smith's message. This group grew into what is now officially known as Brunstad Christian Church. Smith himself described the movement as "a free group of people without a name and without any human organization". Accordingly, Brunstad Christian Church has never maintained membership records. After Smith's death, Elias Aslaksen became a leading figure in the movement, taking overall responsibility for it until he died in 1976. Today Brunstad Christian Church has an estimated 40,000 adherents and churches in 65 countries around the world. It is the only significant international religious movement founded in Norway.

Smith worked to expose what he believed to be widespread superficiality and hypocrisy in mainstream denominations. Not educated in theology, he took a practical and literal view of Scripture, and preached about living in obedience to it and "walking in the light that God gives". His key themes were complete victory over sin, transformation through sanctification and the building up of "Christ's body" (the Church) on earth. Smith was uncompromising in his message and faith, despite standing largely alone in the early years of his work.

== Opposition ==
Smith encountered significant opposition from mainstream denominational churches in Norway. At the turn of the 20th century, Norway saw an increased interest in the baptism of the Holy Spirit. Smith himself experienced such a baptism in 1900. Smith focused on the doctrine of obedience to the Spirit, believing that through such obedience it is possible to be cleansed from indwelling sin and partake of an ever increasing portion of Christian virtue. He felt that others placed emphasis on the experience of receiving the Spirit, but had less interest in a life of obedience. In the earlier years of his religious activity, he spoke and wrote about this regularly, which led to criticism of Smith himself and the new movement generally, not least from the then-emerging Pentecostal movement, led by Thomas Ball Barratt.

== Death ==
Smith died at his home in Horten of a heart attack in the early hours of May 1, 1943. His last words were, "Yes, thanks and praise" as he was retiring to bed earlier that night. Smith's funeral was by far the biggest seen in Horten, despite stringent travel restrictions that were in place due to the German occupation of Norway. In his eulogy, Smith's son, Aksel Johan Smith stated that he had never seen his father unrestful or impatient.

== Published works ==
Smith was a prolific writer. He wrote many poems and songs, a number of books, hundreds of articles and many, many letters to family and friends. Some 280 letters written between 1898 and 1943, mostly to his brother Aksel and Elias Aslaksen, are published by Skjulte Skatters Forlag in the book Letters of Johan O. Smith. The book has been translated into many languages. Smith also authored a short commentary on the Epistle to the Ephesians.
