= Eccleston Hall =

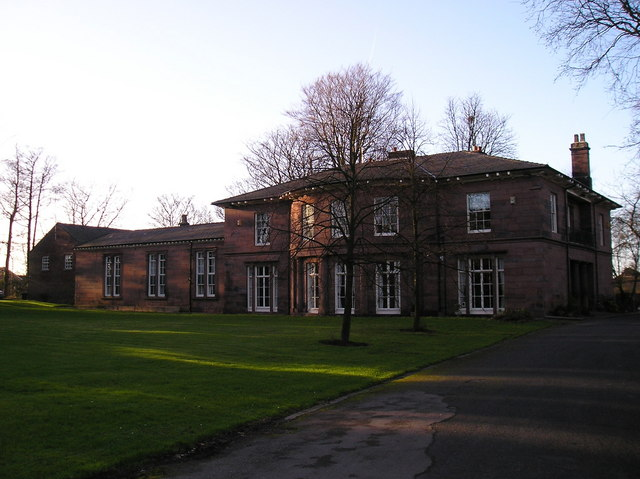
- Eccleston Hall

- Location in Merseyside
- 53.449604°N 2.773403°W
- Location: Eccleston in St Helens, England
- OS grid reference: SJ 4872 9504

History
- Built: 19th century

Listed Building – Grade II
- Designated: 28 February 1989

Eccleston Hall is a Grade II listed hall located in Eccleston, St Helens, Merseyside, England. Originally constructed in the 16th century, the current building dates from 1830. It has been used as a place of worship, of residence and a health sanatorium before being sold to private development in 1997.

== History ==
The current building is the third such hall built on the land with the first being around 1569. It was originally on the estate of Eccleston and Scarisbrick. It was originally used as a place of worship by Catholics; records show that John Swinbourne received £36 from Thomas Eccleston in 1701. A silver chalice at the hall was kept there indefinitely until such time that Mass could be said in nearby Prescot Parish Church. In 1790, the hall was returned to the family owners.

The current hall was built around 1830, by Samuel Taylor, a cotton manufacturer, who had been working in the previous building since 1827. It is constructed mainly of sandstone ashlar, with a hipped roof of Welsh slate. The building includes several Doric columns, and a southwards projection towards the garden. A church was also constructed by Taylor in 1838.

In 1909, the estate around the hall was planned for suburban development. A scheme to build 4,000 homes on the grounds was unveiled in 1919. By this time, the hall was used as a Tuberculosis sanatorium. The building has been Grade II listed since 1989, by which time it was used for hospital administration. In 1997, the building was sold to private development and converted into apartments.
